= 2008 Birthday Honours =

British and commonwealth honours and awards

The Queen's Birthday Honours 2008 were appointments by some of the 16 Commonwealth realms to various orders and honours to recognise and reward good works by citizens of those countries. The Birthday Honours are awarded as part of the Queen's Official Birthday celebrations during the month of June.

They were announced on 14 June 2008 in the United Kingdom, on 9 June 2008 in Australia, on 2 June 2008 in New Zealand, and on 14 June 2008 in Barbados, The Bahamas, Grenada, Papua New Guinea, Solomon Islands, Saint Lucia, and Belize.

The recipients of honours are displayed as they were styled before their new honour and arranged by the country (in order of precedence) whose ministers advised The Queen on the appointments, then by honour with grades i.e. Knight/Dame Grand Cross, Knight/Dame Commander etc. and then divisions i.e. Civil, Diplomatic and Military as appropriate.

== United Kingdom ==
=== Knight Bachelor ===
- Dr. James Iain Walker Anderson, CBE. For public and voluntary service.
- William Samuel Atkinson, Headteacher, Phoenix High School, Hammersmith and Fulham, London. For services to Education and to Community Relations.
- The Right Honourable Alan James Beith, MP, Member of Parliament for Berwick-upon-Tweed. For services to Parliament.
- Professor James Drummond Bone, FRSE, Vice-Chancellor, University of Liverpool. For services to Higher Education and to Regeneration in the North West.
- Professor Christopher Richard Watkin Edwards. For services to Higher Education, Medical Science and to Regeneration in the North East.
- Mark Philip Elder, CBE, Conductor and Music Director, Hallé Orchestra. For services to Music.
- Leonard Raymond Fenwick, CBE, Chief Executive, Newcastle upon Tyne Hospitals NHS Foundation Trust. For services to Healthcare and to the community in Tyne and Wear.
- Dr. Philip John Hunter, CBE, Chief Schools Adjudicator. For services to Education.
- Moir Lockhead, OBE, Chief Executive, FirstGroup. For services to Transport.
- Professor Andrew James McMichael, FRS, Professor of Molecular Medicine and Director, Weatherall Institute of Molecular Medicine, University of Oxford. For services to Medical Science.
- William Moorcroft, Principal, Trafford College. For services to local and national Further Education.
- William Desmond Sargent, CBE, Executive Chair, Better Regulation Executive, Department for Business, Enterprise and Regulatory Reform. For services to Business.
- Michael John Snyder. For services to Business and to the City of London Corporation.
- Paul Robert Stephenson, QPM, Deputy Commissioner, Metropolitan Police Service. For services to the Police.
- Professor Anthony John Newman Taylor, CBE, lately Chair, Industrial Injuries Advisory Council. For public service.
- Peter John Viggers, MP, Member of Parliament for Gosport. For services to Parliament.
- Professor Nicholas John Wald, Professor of Environmental and Preventive Medicine, Wolfson Institute of Preventive Medicine, Queen Mary, University of London. For services to Preventive Medicine.

Diplomatic Service and Overseas List

- Dr. Richard John Roberts. For services to molecular biology and UK science, USA.

=== Order of the Bath ===
==== Knight Grand Cross of the Order of the Bath (GCB) ====
Military Division

- Admiral Sir Jonathon Band, KCB, ADC.
- Air Chief Marshal Sir Glenn Lester Torpy, KCB, CBE, DSO, ADC, Royal Air Force.

==== Dame Commander of the Order of the Bath (DCB) ====
Civil Division

- Helen Frances Ghosh, Permanent Secretary, Department for the Environment, Food and Rural Affairs.

==== Knight Commander of the Order of the Bath (KCB) ====
Military Division

- Lieutenant General John Nicholas Reynolds Houghton, CBE, (497441), late The Green Howards.

==== Companion of the Order of the Bath (CB) ====
Military Division

Royal Navy

- Rear Admiral Richard Jeffery Ibbotson, DSC.
- Rear Admiral Paul Lambert.

Army

- Major General Gary Robert Coward, OBE, (497393), late Army Air Corps.
- Major General Gerald Cavendish Grosvenor, The Duke of Westminster, KG, OBE, TD, DL.(494683), late The Queen's Own Yeomanry, Territorial Army.

Royal Air Force

- Air Vice-Marshal Steven Chisnall.

Civil Division

- Timothy John Burr, Comptroller and Auditor-General, National Audit Office.
- Louise Casey. For public service.
- Jeremy Carl Groombridge, Director of Transformation and Product Management, Jobcentre Plus. For public and voluntary service.
- Lin Homer, Chief Executive, Border and Immigration Agency. For public and voluntary service.
- William Roy Junkin, Deputy Director of Public Prosecutions for Northern Ireland.
- Stephen Quinn, Permanent Secretary, Department of Enterprise, Trade and Investment, Northern Ireland Executive.

=== Order of Saint Michael and Saint George ===
==== Knight Commander of the Order of St Michael and St George (KCMG) ====
Diplomatic Service and Overseas List
Members of the Second Class, or Knights Commander, of the Most Distinguished Order

- Geoffrey Doyne Adams, CMG, HM Ambassador, Iran.
- Nigel Kim Darroch, CMG, UK Permanent Representative, Brussels.

==== Companion of the Order of St Michael and St George (CMG) ====
- Michael David Apted. For services to the British film and television industries, USA.
- Nigel Conrad Chapman, Director of the BBC World Service and Chair of the BBC World Service Trust. For services to international broadcasting.
- Michael James Crawford, Counsellor, Foreign and Commonwealth Office.
- Karen Elizabeth Pierce, UK Deputy Permanent Representative to the United Nations, New York.
- Mark Sedwill, lately Director, UKVisas, Foreign and Commonwealth Office/Home Office.
- David Arthur Slinn, OBE, lately Head, Provincial Reconstruction Team, Helmand, Afghanistan.
- Anthony Donald Raymond Smith, Director, European Political Affairs, Foreign and Commonwealth Office.
- Nicholas Simon Syrett, Counsellor, Foreign and Commonwealth Office.

=== Royal Victorian Order ===
==== Dame Commander of the Royal Victorian Order (DCVO) ====
- Julia Charity Cleverdon, CVO, CBE, formerly Chief Executive, Business in the Community.

==== Knight Commander of the Royal Victorian Order (KCVO) ====
- Hugo Laurence Joseph Brunner, JP, Lord Lieutenant of Oxfordshire.
- Charles Michael Henderson, The Lord Faringdon, Lord-in-waiting to The Queen.
- Commodore Robert Cameron Hastie, CBE, RD, JP, formerly Lord Lieutenant of West Glamorgan.

==== Commander of the Royal Victorian Order (CVO) ====
- Nicolas Clark Adamson, LVO, OBE, Private Secretary to The Duke of Kent.
- Robin Orr Blair, LVO, formerly Lord Lyon King of Arms and Secretary of the Order of the Thistle.
- William Edward Chapman, formerly Prime Minister's Secretary for Appointments.
- Robert George Clinton, formerly Senior Partner, Farrer & Co LLP.
- Professor John Cunningham, Head of the Medical Household and Physician to The Queen.
- Brigadier Donald Graeme Hardie, TD, JP, formerly Lord Lieutenant of Dunbartonshire.
- Diane Elizabeth Morcom, formerly Secretary of the Cabinet and Clerk of the Executive Council in New Zealand. (Note: Appointed a Commander of The Royal Victorian Order (CVO) in the UK list and a Companion of The New Zealand Order of Merit (CNZM) in the NZ list.)
- Rachel Anne Wells, LVO, Assistant Secretary, Central Chancery of the Orders of Knighthood.

==== Lieutenant of the Royal Victorian Order (LVO) ====
- Nigel Joseph Arch, Director, Kensington Palace, Historic Royal Palaces.
- Allan Bridgewater, CBE. For services to The Duke of Edinburgh's Commonwealth Study Conferences.
- Pamela Margaret Clark, MVO, Registrar, Royal Archives.
- Veronica Anne (Polly) Courtice, Co-Director and Chief Executive, The Prince of Wales's Business in the Environment Programme.
- Philip Brian Everett, Deputy Ranger, Windsor Great Park Crown Estate.
- Angela Christine Mary Heylin (Mrs. Minzly), OBE, Formerly Trustee, Historic Royal Palaces.
- Nicholas Altham Kidd, Training Captain/Aircraft Captain, The Queen's Helicopter Flight.
- Martin Ronald Watson, Partner, Forest House Veterinary Group.
- Dr. David Anthony Zideman, Honorary Physician (Civilian) to The Queen.

==== Member of the Royal Victorian Order (MVO) ====
- Jennifer Margaret Cannon, Legal Executive, Farrer & Co LLP.
- Squadron Leader Jayne Susan Casebury, Royal Air Force, Equerry to the Prince of Wales and the Duchess of Cornwall.
- Frances Amelia Eason, Senior Secretary, The Princess Royal's Household.
- Diane Eddy, Administration Secretary, Balmoral Estate.
- Angela Michèle Edwards (Mrs. Clark), Information Officer, Press Office, Royal Household.
- Sergeant Christopher John Gislingham, Metropolitan Police. For services to Royalty Protection.
- Terence Dennis Gough, Head of Gardens and Estates, Historic Royal Palaces.
- Jill Patricia Hurdman, formerly Administrator, The Royal Warrant Holders Association.
- Roderick Andrew Lane, Head Book Conservator, Royal Library, Windsor Castle.
- Christopher Paul Matthews, Deputy Land Steward, Western District, Duchy of Cornwall.
- Moira McDougall, Secretary to the Resident Factor, Balmoral Estate.
- Superintendent Timothy Andrew Marriott Nash, Metropolitan Police. For services to Royalty Protection.
- Caroline Lucy Whitaker, Assistant Surveyor of The Queen's Pictures, Royal Collection.

==== Medal of the Royal Victorian Order (RVM) ====
Bar to the Royal Victorian Medal (Silver)

- David Cartledge, RVM, Senior Stallion Handler, Royal Studs.

Royal Victorian Medal (Silver)

- Charles Thomas Bouch, formerly Yeoman Bed Goer, The Queen's Bodyguard of the Yeomen of the Guard.
- Paul Lawrence Burch, Gamekeeper, Sandringham Estate.
- Bernadette Therese Darbin, Telephone Operator, Royal Household.
- Corporal Brian Diggle, Orderly to The Duke of Edinburgh.
- John Paul Fallis, Warden, The Great Park, Windsor Crown Estate.
- Peter Ivor Jeffery, Estate Foreman, Eastern District, Duchy of Cornwall.
- Margaret Susan Mattocks, Telephone Operator, Royal Household.
- Paul David Murray, Senior Storeman, Master of the Household's Department, Royal Household.
- Maria Sizaltine (Tina) Peti, Housekeeper to Princess Alexandra, the Honourable Lady Ogilvy.
- Paul Eric Southwell, House Foreman, Sandringham Estate.

=== Order of the Companions of Honour (CH) ===
- Richard George, The Lord Rogers of Riverside. For public service and for services to Architecture.

=== Order of the British Empire ===
==== Dame Commander of the Order of the British Empire (DBE) ====
Civil Division

- Joan Dawson Bakewell, CBE, Broadcaster and Writer. For services to Journalism and to the Arts.
- Professor Christine Joan Beasley, CBE, Chief Nursing Officer, Department of Health. For public and voluntary service.
- Hilary Sharon Braverman Blume. For services to the Voluntary Sector.
- Professor Janet Valerie Finch, CBE, DL, Vice-Chancellor, Keele University. For services to Social Science and to Higher Education.
- Clara Hedwig Frances Furse, Chief Executive, London Stock Exchange. For services to the Financial Services Industry.
- Margaret, Lady Holroyd (Mrs. Drabble), CBE, Author. For services to Literature.
- Donna Kinnair, Director of Clinical Leadership, Southwark Primary Care Trust. For services to Nursing in London.
- Monica Margaret Mason, OBE, Director of the Royal Ballet. For services to Dance.
- Barbara Mary Stocking, CBE, Chief Executive, Oxfam GB. For services to Humanitarian work.

==== Knight Commander of the Order of the British Empire (KBE) ====
Military Division

- Vice Admiral Anthony Knox Dymock, CB.

==== Commander of the Order of the British Empire (CBE) ====
Military Division

Royal Navy

- Rear Admiral Neil Degge Latham.
- Commodore James Patrick.
- Commodore Simon David Whalley.

Army

- Colonel William Neville Aldridge, OBE, (510002), late The Royal Regiment of Fusiliers.
- Colonel Richard William Currie (504911), late The Queen's Royal Hussars.
- Brigadier Clive Richard Elderton, OBE, (495507), late The Royal Logistic Corps.
- Brigadier Colin Andrew Findlay, MBE, (500092), late Adjutant General's Corps (Royal Military Police).
- Brigadier Iain Robert Thomson (504514), late Army Air Corps.
- Brigadier Carew Lovell Wilks, MBE, (507072), late Corps of Royal Engineers.

Royal Air Force

- Group Captain Sean Keith Paul Reynolds, OBE, DFC.
- Air Commodore Mark Lee Roberts, MBE.

Civil Division

- Dr. Khurshid Ahmed, Chair, British Muslim Forum. For services to Community Relations in Birmingham.
- Janet Bruce, Lady Balfour of Burleigh. For public and voluntary service in Scotland.
- Michael William Bateman, Non-Executive Director, Dollond & Aitchison. For services to the Optical Profession and to Charity.
- William Blackledge Beaumont, OBE. For services to Rugby and to Charity.
- Charles Stuart Bell, Chief Executive, South London and Maudsley NHS Foundation Trust. For services to Healthcare.
- Archibald Anderson Bethel, OBE, lately Chair, Scottish Enterprise Lanarkshire. For services to Business and to Economic Development in Lanarkshire.
- Mary Black. For services to Healthcare and to the community in Northern Ireland.
- Bernard Borland, Principal, St. Francis Xavier Sixth Form College, Clapham. For services to Further Education in London.
- Thomas Sebastian Brooman, Co-founder and lately Artistic Director, World of Music, Arts and Dance Festival. For services to Music and to Charity.
- Richard Calvocoressi, Director, Henry Moore Foundation. For services to the Arts, particularly in Scotland.
- Joseph William Calzaghe, MBE, Boxer. For services to Sport and for voluntary service in Wales.
- Graham Stanley Cartledge, Chair, Benoy. For services to Architecture and to Charity.
- Professor John Cleland, FBA, Professor of Medical Demography, London School of Hygiene and Tropical Medicine. For services to Social Science.
- Professor Anthony Cohen, FRSE, Principal and Vice-Chancellor, Queen Margaret University, Edinburgh. For services to Higher Education in Scotland.
- Professor Paul Collier, Professor of Economics and Director, Centre for the Study of African Economies, University of Oxford. For services to Scholarship and Development.
- Rosemary Cook, Director, Queen's Nursing Institute. For services to Healthcare.
- Andrew Maxwell Coppel, Chair, Tourism Ireland Ltd. For services to the Tourism Industry.
- David Darling, Co-founder, Codemasters. For services to the Computer Games Industry.
- Richard Darling, Co-founder, Codemasters. For services to the Computer Industry.
- Christopher Kenneth Davidson, National Business Director, HM Revenue and Customs.
- Lloyd Dorfman, Chair, Travelex Group. For services to Business and to Charity.
- Professor Brian Ion Duerden, Professor of Medical Microbiology, Cardiff University School of Medicine. For services to Medicine and to Charity.
- Professor Christopher Charles Dyer, FBA, Professor of Local and Regional History and Director, Centre for English Local History, University of Leicester. For services to Scholarship.
- John Edwards, lately Chief Executive, Advantage West Midlands. For services to the Rural Economy.
- Nigel Robert Elwes, Chairman, Racing Welfare and Chairman, British Racing School. For services to the Horse Racing Industry.
- Edward Hamilton Fitzgerald, QC, Lawyer. For services to Human Rights.
- Edmond Charles Paul Fivet, lately Principal, Royal Welsh College of Music & Drama. For services to the Arts and to Higher Education in Wales.
- John Edward Foster, lately Chief Executive, Wakefield Metropolitan District Council. For services to Local Government.
- Professor William David George, lately Regius Professor of Surgery, Western Infirmary, Glasgow. For services to Medicine.
- Richard Gillingwater, Chair, Shareholder Executive. For services to the Financial Services Industry.
- Professor Anthony Howard Goldstone, Consultant Haematologist, University College London Hospital Trust and Director, North London Cancer Network. For services to Medicine.
- Theresa Mary Green, Chairman, Royal Marsden NHS Foundation Trust. For services to Healthcare.
- Guy Rhodri Griffiths, Managing Director, BAE Systems Integrated Technologies. For services to the Defence Industry.
- John Grimshaw, MBE, Founder and Chief Executive of Sustrans. For services to the Development of the National Cycle Network.
- Antony Hales, Chair, Navy, Army and Air Force Institutes. For services to the Armed Forces.
- Joe Harley, IT Director-General and Chief Information Officer, Department for Work and Pensions.
- Professor Paul Harvey, FRS, Head of the Department of Zoology, University of Oxford. For services to Science.
- Michael George Hayes, Chief Executive, West Northamptonshire Development Corporation. For services to Local Government and to the Voluntary Sector.
- Mark Haysom, Chief Executive, Learning and Skills Council for England. For services to Education and to Training.
- Peter John Hewitt, lately Chief Executive, Arts Council England. For services to the Arts.
- Professor Charles Adrian Hobbs. For services to Road Safety.
- Dr. Graham Aubrey Honeyman, Chief Executive Officer, Sheffield Forgemasters International Ltd. For services to Industry.
- Dr Aileen Margaret Keel, Deputy Chief Medical Officer, Scottish Executive.
- Michael Gerard Kennedy, Chief Operating Officer, Crown Prosecution Service; lately President and UK National Member of Eurojust.
- Councillor Mohammed Afzal Khan. For services to Community and Inter-Faith Relations and to Local Government in Manchester.
- Frederick John Landeg, lately Acting Chief Veterinary Officer and Director, Veterinary Policy, Department for Environment, Food and Rural Affairs.
- Lynda La Plante, Writer and Producer. For services to Literature, Drama and to Charity.
- Dr. Paul Leinster, Director of Operations, Environment Agency. For public and voluntary service.
- Professor Peter Simon Liss, Professor, School of Environmental Sciences, University of East Anglia. For services to Science.
- Dr. John Menzies Low, Chief Executive, Charities Aid Foundation. For services to the Voluntary Sector and to Deaf People.
- Michael Francis Lynch, AM, Chief Executive, Southbank Centre. For services to the Arts.
- Brian Magenis, Senior Civil Servant, Ministry of Defence. For public and voluntary service.
- Howard Leslie Mathers, Senior Civil Servant, Ministry of Defence. For public and voluntary service.
- Brian Edward McHenry, lately General-Counsel, Office of Fair Trading. For public and voluntary service.
- Professor Hugh McKenna, Dean, Faculty of Life and Health Sciences, University of Ulster. For services to Healthcare and to the community in Northern Ireland.
- William Robert McQueen, lately Deputy Chief Executive, Crown Office and Procurator Fiscal Service, Scottish Executive.
- Janet Meacham, Deputy Director, Emergency Preparedness Division, Department of Health.
- Robin Ernest Vincent Middleton, lately Secretary of State's Representative for Salvage and Intervention, Department for Transport. For public and voluntary service.
- Colin McLeod Milne, President, Employment Tribunal, Scotland. For services to the Administration of Justice.
- Duncan Mitchell, Senior Vice President, Cisco Systems UK and Ireland. For services to Business.
- Dr. Michael John More, lately Chief Executive, Suffolk County Council. For services to Local Government.
- Roy Alfred Morris, DL. For services to Economic Development and to the community in Merseyside.
- Paul Newdick, Chair of LawWorks. For services to Pro Bono Legal Services.
- Professor Peter Raymond Noyce, Professor of Pharmacy Practice, University of Manchester. For services to Healthcare.
- Michael Laurence Nyman, Composer, Musician and Music Critic. For services to Music.
- Fionnuala Mary Jay-O'Boyle, MBE. For services to Heritage in Northern Ireland.
- Desmond Bernard O'Connor. For services to Entertainment and to Broadcasting.
- Alan Parker, Chief Executive Officer, Whitbread Group. For services to the Hospitality Industry.
- Graham Parker, Head of Public Sector Finance Team, HM Treasury.
- Professor Ian Philp, lately National Director for Older People's Services and Neurological Conditions. For services to Healthcare.
- Professor Michael John Pilling, lately Director, Natural Environment Research Council Distributed Institute for Atmospheric Composition, University of Leeds. For services to Chemistry.
- Andrew William Reid, lately Divisional Manager, Institutional Inspections and Frameworks Division, Ofsted, Department for Children, Schools and Families.
- Professor Randolph Richards, Professor in Aquatic Veterinary Studies, University of Stirling and Director, Institute of Aquaculture. For services to Veterinary Science.
- Duncan Robinson, DL, lately Director, Fitzwilliam Museum, Cambridge. For services to the Heritage of Art.
- Richard Willis Rogers, lately Chief Executive, Environment and Heritage Service, Department of the Environment, Northern Ireland Executive.
- Denis Rooney, MBE, Chair, International Fund for Ireland. For services to Economic Development and to the community in Northern Ireland.
- Anthony Paul Rossi. For services to Heritage and to Conservation.
- Gerald Anthony Scarfe, Cartoonist and Caricaturist. For services to the Arts.
- Heather Schroeder, Director of Children, Schools and Families, London Borough of Camden. For services to Social Care.
- Peter Denys John Scott, QC, Chair, Panel on Takeovers and Mergers. For services to Business, the Legal Profession and to the Arts.
- Francis John Sheehan, QFSM, Chief Fire Officer, West Midlands Fire and Rescue Service. For service to Local Government.
- Richard David Shepherd, OBE, Artist. For services to Charity and to Wildlife Conservation.
- Philip Douglas Silvester, Headteacher, Westfield Technology College, Dorset. For services to local and national Special Needs Education.
- Councillor Nicholas William Skellett, Leader, Surrey County Council. For services to Local Government.
- David Thomas Smith, Director, Business Relations, Special Projects, Department for Business, Enterprise and Regulatory Reform.
- Peter David Smith, QC, Chairman, Life Sentence Review Commissioners. For services to the Criminal Justice System in Northern Ireland.
- Dr. Graham Nigel Spittle, Director, IBM Hursley Laboratory and Chair, Technology Strategy Board and Vice President, Software, UKISA (UK, Ireland and South Africa) IBM. For services to Industry.
- Henry Leonard Tee, Chair, Electronics Leadership Council. For services to the Electronics Industry.
- Maria Donata Nanette Pauline Erwina Wilhelmina Gustava Thorpe, Co-Founder, Leeds International Pianoforte Competition. For services to Music.
- Stewart Ronald Towe, Managing Director, Hadley Industries and Chair, Black Country Consortium. For services to Business in the West Midlands.
- Martin Peter Tune, Headteacher, Bonner Primary School, Tower Hamlets, London. For services to local and national Education.
- Professor Marina Sarah Warner, FBA, Writer. For services to Literature.
- Mela Lesley Jane Watts, Principal Private Secretary, Department for Children, Schools and Families.
- Lindsay Diane Wilkinson, Head of Cancer and End of Life Care Policy, Department of Health.
- Professor Dianne Marie Willcocks, Vice-Chancellor, York St John University. For services to Higher Education and to the community in Yorkshire.
- Derek Maurice Wise, Headteacher, Cramlington Community High School, Northumberland. For services to local and national Education.
- Victoria Wood, OBE, Comedian and Writer. For services to Entertainment.

Diplomatic Service and Overseas List

- Rajinder Loomba. For charitable services to poor widows and their children overseas, particularly in India, and to UK/India interests more widely.
- Richard Charles Perry, OBE, Vice President, Cable and Wireless Network Planning, UK.
- Dr. Oliver Wolf Sacks, Physician, author and academic. For services to medicine.

==== Officer of the Order of the British Empire (OBE) ====
Military Division

Royal Navy

- Commodore Malcolm Byrne Avery.
- Commander Alan Charles Cole.
- Commander Kevin Andrew Fox.
- Commander Michael Peter Martin.
- Surgeon Commodore (D) Graham Lindsay Morrison.
- Captain John Jeremy Taylor.
- Captain Simon Jonathan Woodcock.

Army

- Lieutenant Colonel David Alfred John Brown (523325), The Rifles.
- Lieutenant Colonel Richard Callander, TD, (496000), Queen's Own Yeomanry, Territorial Army.
- Lieutenant Colonel Mark Patrick Christie, MBE, (527789), The Parachute Regiment.
- Lieutenant Colonel (Acting Colonel) Mark Nicholas Claydon (511006), The Mercian Regiment.
- Lieutenant Colonel Richard James Clements (510295), The Royal Anglian Regiment.
- Lieutenant Colonel Charles Henry Waters Gray (500361), The Duke of Lancaster's Regiment.
- Lieutenant Colonel Michael Thomas Haverty (534843), The Royal Logistic Corps.
- Lieutenant Colonel Andrew Walton Ledger (500965), The Queen's Royal Hussars.
- Acting Colonel David George McCleery (504286), Army Cadet Force.
- Lieutenant Colonel Christopher Edward Price (483815), The Royal Regiment of Scotland, Territorial Army.

Royal Air Force

- Wing Commander Tomas Arne Barrett (2628749H).
- Group Captain Andrew Peter Bowen (8028852H).
- Wing Commander Timothy John Bullement (2628468D).
- Wing Commander Peter John Grinsted (8150994L).
- Flying Officer Ian Stevenson Kerr (0208630G), Royal Air Force Volunteer Reserve (Training).
- The Reverend (Wing Commander) Christopher Webb (5208073W).

Civil Division

- Alexandra, The Duchess of Abercorn. For voluntary service to the community in Northern Ireland through the Pushkin Trust.
- Richard Charles Abnett. For services to Intellectual Property Rights.
- Jennifer Adams, LVO, Director of Open Spaces, City of London Corporation. For services to the Environment and to Local Government.
- Fayyaz Afzal, Barrister. For services to the Judiciary and to voluntary service to Disabled People.
- Riaz Ahmad, JP. For services to Local Government, the Administration of Justice and to the community in Oldham.
- Mervyn John Ainsworth, lately Chief Executive, Institute of Chartered Secretaries and Administrators. For services to Business.
- Professor Jim Al-Khalili, Professor of Physics and Professor of Public Engagement in Science, University of Surrey. For services to Physics.
- Sayyid Yousif Al-Khoei, Director, al-Khoei Foundation. For services to Community Relations.
- Professor Dennis Anderson. For services to the Energy Industry. (Deceased: to be dated 18 April 2008).
- Cynthia Atwell, Chair, Royal College of Nursing Society Occupational Health Nursing. For services to Healthcare.
- Anthony John James Bailey. For services to Inter-Faith Relations and to Charity.
- Michael Balfour, Co-founder and Co-chair, Fitness First Health Clubs. For services to Business.
- Professor Frances Rosemary Balkwill, Professor of Cancer Biology, Queen Mary, University of London. For services to Science Communication to Children.
- Tunde Banjoko, Chief Executive, Local Employment Access Projects. For services to Employment and to Training in London.
- Christine Frances Bantock, Section Head, Industry Sponsorship, Medical Devices, Department of Health.
- Dr. Jennifer Lucy Bate, Concert Organist. For services to Music.
- The Reverend Peter Martyn Beacham, Heritage Protection Director, English Heritage. For services to the Historic Environment.
- Dr. Catherine Susan Minshull-Beech, Chief Executive, Aitua Limited. For services to Technology and Innovation.
- Susan Elizabeth Berry, Chair, British Children's Ski Team Selection Panel. For voluntary service to Sport.
- Dr. Simon Best, FRSE, Chair, UK BioIndustry Association (BIA). For services to the Pharmaceutical Industry.
- Iqbal Bhana, DL. For services to Community Relations in West Yorkshire.
- Giles Bird, Headteacher, Kingsmead School, Enfield, Middlesex. For services to Education.
- Malorie Blackman, Writer. For services to Children's Literature.
- Peter Scott-Blackman, Chief Executive Officer, Afiya Trust. For voluntary services to Black and Minority Ethnic Healthcare.
- Dr. Roger Ferrant Bland, Head, Department of Portable Antiquities and Treasure, British Museum. For services to Heritage.
- Virginia Bovell. For voluntary service to Autistic Children.
- Richard Sheridan Bowling, Painter and Writer. For services to Art.
- Dr. Henry John Bragg. For voluntary service to the community in East Kent.
- Dr. Timothy John Brain, QPM, Chief Constable, Gloucestershire Constabulary. For services to the Police and to the community in Gloucestershire.
- Richard Trevor Broadhurst, lately Recreation Officer, Forestry Commission. For public and voluntary service.
- Air Commodore Jack Broughton, DL, Royal Air Force (Retd.) For voluntary service to the Aircrew Association.
- William Alan Brown, Senior Manager A, HM Prison Liverpool.
- Raymond Alfred Browne, Business Continuity Manager, Technology Strategy Board, Department for Innovation, Universities and Skills.
- Professor Frederick Michael Burdekin, FRS, Emeritus Professor, University of Manchester. For services to Nuclear Safety.
- Robin Burgess, DL, Chief Executive, CN Group Ltd. For services to the Newspaper Industry and to the community in Cumbria.
- Dr. Yvonne Ann Burne, lately Headteacher, City of London School for Girls. For services to Education in London.
- Janet Callender, Chief Executive, Tameside Metropolitan Borough Council. For services to Local Government.
- Brigid Campbell, Member, Social Security Advisory Committee. For services to Social Security Law and to Charity.
- John Donington Campbell, Chair, Scottish Financial Enterprise. For services to the Financial Services Industry.
- Rosamond Isobel Cassy, Chair, Local Strategic Partnership. For services to the community in Southampton.
- Henry Greville Cator, DL, Chairman, Norwich Cathedral Campaign. For voluntary service to the community in Norfolk.
- Lorraine Cavanagh. For services to the community in East London.
- Derek Anthony Chadbon, lately General-Secretary, Retained Firefighters' Union. For services to the Fire and Rescue Service.
- Charles Ting Yim Chan. For voluntary service to the Chinese community in Greater Manchester.
- William John Yendell Chapple, Deputy-Leader, Buckinghamshire County Council. For services to Local Government and to the community in Aylesbury and Buckinghamshire.
- Jashvant Chauhan, Inspector of Taxes, Leicester, HM Revenue and Customs. For public and voluntary service.
- Tim Clark. For voluntary service to UNICEF UK.
- David Guy Clarke, TD, DL. For voluntary service to the community in Wales.
- Professor John Richard Coggins, FRSE, Vice-Principal, Faculties of Biomedical and Life Sciences, Clinical Medicine and Veterinary Medicine, University of Glasgow. For services to Science.
- Dr. David John Comley, lately Director of Housing and Social Work, Glasgow City Council. For services to Local Government.
- John Dinsmore Cooke, Head of Near-Market Research and Development, Innovation, Research and Technology Division, Invest Northern Ireland, Northern Ireland Executive.
- Dinah Cox, Chief Executive, Race on the Agenda. For services to Community Relations in London.
- Dr. Harriet Mary Crabtree, Director, Inter Faith Network for the UK. For services to Community Relations.
- John Denis Crawforth, Chief Probation Officer, Greater Manchester. For public and voluntary service.
- Professor John Cummings, Professor of Experimental Gastroenterology, University of Dundee. For services to Medicine and to Nutrition.
- Professor Candace Currie, Director, Child and Adolescent Health, University of Edinburgh. For services to Healthcare.
- Bronwyn Curtis. For services to Business Economics.
- Sally Daghlian, lately Chief Executive, Scottish Refugee Council. For services to Human Rights.
- John Victor Dalby, Headteacher, St. Philip's Church of England Primary School, Hulme. For services to Education in Manchester.
- Lawrence Bruno Nero Dallaglio, MBE, England Rugby Union Player and Captain, London Wasps Rugby Team. For services to Rugby and to Charity.
- Colin Robert Davies, Head, Complex Case Work Unit, Merseyside and Cheshire Crown Prosecution Service.
- Stephen Russell Davies, Television Screenwriter. For services to Drama.
- Professor Wendy Davies, FBA, Professor of History and lately Pro-Provost-Europe, University College London. For services to Research in the Humanities and to Higher Education.
- Malcolm Edward Dawson, lately Pay and Grading Director, Ministry of Justice.
- Lois Elizabeth Devey, Team Leader, Commercial and Procurement Services, Department for Children, Schools and Families. For public and voluntary services.
- Colonel Charles George Dickie, TD. For voluntary service to the Soldiers', Sailors' and Airmen's Families Association in the West Midlands.
- Maurice Djanogly. For services to Business and to the Arts.
- Susan Donovan, Headteacher, Holmewood Nursery School, Lambeth, London. For services to Early Years Education.
- Antonia Elizabeth Brigid Luise, The Marchioness of Douro, President, Guinness Trust. For voluntary service to Social Housing.
- Glynis Dowling, Grade A, Northern Ireland Office. For public and voluntary service.
- Anthony Duggan, Councillor and Chair, Bedfordshire and Luton Combined Fire Authority. For services to the Fire and Rescue Service and to Local Government.
- Professor John Harry Dunning. For services to International Business Scholarship.
- Chiwetel Ejiofor, Actor. For services to Drama.
- Patricia Ellison, Business Change Manager, Barnardo's. For services to Children and to the community in Stockton-on-Tees.
- ~~Richard George Evans. For services to the community in Gloucestershire.~~
- Vivienne Evans, Chief Executive, AdFam. For services to Families and Carers in Drug Education and Prevention.
- Kevin Bruce Eveleigh, Headteacher, Barnby Road Primary and Nursery School. For services to Education and to Sport in Nottinghamshire.
- Professor Richard Fawcett, Principal Inspector, Historic Scotland. For public and voluntary service.
- Deborah Kim Fern. For charitable services.
- Susannah Kate Fish, Assistant Chief Constable, Nottinghamshire Police. For services to the Police.
- Chris Freegard, Managing Director, Newport City Council. For services to Local Government in South Wales.
- Andy Gale, lately Specialist Adviser, Housing Needs Team, Department for Communities and Local Government.
- David Gardiner, Tenant Member, Estate Board, St. Martin's Community Partnership. For voluntary service to Social Housing in South London.
- Malcolm Grenville Gasking, lately Grade B1, Ministry of Defence.
- John Brian Gillow, Chairman, Shropshire County Council. For services to Local Government and to the Voluntary Sector.
- Godfrey Harold Glyn, Principal, Barton Peveril Sixth Form College, Eastleigh, Hampshire and Council Representative, Sixth Form Colleges Forum. For services to Further Education.
- Ian Ogilvie Gordon. For services to the community and to the Edinburgh Military Tattoo.
- Robert Edward Green, Head of Forensic Science, Police Standards Unit, Home Office.
- Professor Russel Griggs. For services to Business in Scotland.
- Daniel Edward Gunn, Governor, HM Prison Glenochil. For public and voluntary service.
- Professor Romesh Chand Gupta, Consultant Physician and Hospital Lead for Stroke Services, Lancashire Teaching Hospital NHS Foundation Trust. For services to Medicine and to the community in Lancashire.
- Professor Muhammad Abdel Haleem, King Fahd Professor of Islamic Studies, School of Oriental and African Studies. For services to Arabic Culture and Literature and to Inter-Faith understanding.
- Brian John Harbord, Head of Intelligent Transport Systems Development, Department for Transport.
- Catherine Haugh, Deputy Director, Human Resources Recruitment and Redeployment Unit, Department for Business, Enterprise and Regulatory Reform.
- Susan Louise Henderson, Team Leader, Skills for Life Strategy Unit, Department for Innovation, Universities and Skills.
- Professor Irene Higginson, Professor of Palliative Care and Policy, Guy's, King's and St. Thomas' School of Medicine, King's College London. For services to Medicine.
- Matthew MacDonald Hillin, Client Services Manager (Northern Area), Child Support Agency. For public and voluntary service.
- Elizabeth Hogarth, Head of Women's Policy Team, Criminal Justice Group, Ministry of Justice.
- Dr. Paul Andrew Hollinshead, lately Director of Science and Technology, Ministry of Defence.
- Jeremy Thomas Hopkinson. For charitable services.
- Professor Pamela Howard, Theatre Designer. For services to Drama.
- Graham Hoyle, Chief Executive, Association of Learning Providers. For services to Skills Training.
- Uzoamaka Linda Iwobi. For services to Community Relations and to the community in South Wales.
- Vincent Jack, Headteacher, Willowbank School, North Lanarkshire. For services to Education.
- Ken James, lately Chief Executive Officer, Chartered Institute of Purchasing and Supply. For public service.
- Dr. Susan Ann Jebb, Head of Nutrition and Health, Medical Research Council Human Nutrition Research Unit, Cambridge. For services to Public Health.
- Dr. Anthony Michael Jenner, Deputy Chief Dental Officer, Department of Health.
- James Johnson, Deputy Head of Banking Operations, HM Revenue and Customs.
- Arthur Anthony Joiner, JP, lately Chair, Bristol Magistrates' Bench. For services to the Administration of Justice.
- Andrew Vincent Kelly, lately Grade B1, Ministry of Defence.
- Professor Richard Donovan Kenway, FRSE, Vice-Principal, High Performance Computing and e-Science and Tait Professor of Mathematical Physics, University of Edinburgh. For services to Science.
- Peter Kershaw, Head of Upstream Infrastructure and Median Line Fields, Department for Business, Enterprise and Regulatory Reform.
- Raymond Kiddell, Vice-President, Football Association and Founder of Football in the Community. For services to Sport and to the community in Norfolk.
- Dr. James Kerr Kirkwood. For services to Animal Welfare.
- Margaret Elizabeth Knights, Policy and External Communications PAYE, HM Revenue and Customs.
- Joyce Laing. For services to the Arts in Fife.
- Elaine Laken, Justices Clerk for Bath, North Avon and Mendip, Her Majesty's Courts Service.
- Michael Phillip Large. For services to Business and to the community in the East of England.
- Professor Gloria Laycock, Director, Jill Dando Institute of Crime Science, University College London. For services to Crime Policy.
- Deborah Leary, Founder, Forensic Pathways Ltd. For services to Entrepreneurship and to the community in Staffordshire.
- Elizabeth Jane Lewington, Chief Executive, North East Lincolnshire Care Trust Plus. For services to Social Care.
- Elizabeth Mary Margaret Liddell, Chief Executive, Aparna Charitable Trust (UK). For services to Social Care in India.
- Anthony William Lilley, Chief Creative Officer, Magic Lantern Productions. For services to Media and Creative Industries.
- Brian Lister, Principal, Cumbernauld College. For services to Further Education and to the communities in Lanarkshire and Dunbartonshire.
- David John Livermore. For services to People with Hearing Difficulties and to the Newbury Spring Festival in Berkshire.
- David James Duncan Livingstone, Chairman, The Clyde Group. For services to Maritime Training, Shipping Industry and to the community in Glasgow.
- Evelyn, Lady Lloyd (Eve Pollard). For services to Journalism and to Broadcasting.
- Peter Lobban, Chief Executive, CITB-ConstructionSkills. For services to Further Education, Skills and Training.
- Professor George Gordon Lunt, Deputy Vice-Chancellor, University of Bath. For services to Higher Education.
- Christopher John Macgowan, lately Chief Executive, Society of Motor Manufacturers and Traders. For services to the Automotive Industry.
- Patrick John Machray, Chair, Scottish Enterprise Grampian. For services to the Economy and to Charity in North East Scotland.
- Mary MacLeod, Chief Executive, Family and Parenting Institute. For voluntary and public service.
- Dr. Edward Major, lately Clinical Director, Intensive Therapy Unit, Swansea. For services to the NHS.
- Rosemary Manning. For voluntary service to the community in Knowle West, Bristol.
- Geoffrey Conway Marks. For services to Golf.
- Keith McCosh Marshall, Chief Executive, SummitSkills. For services to Skills Training in the Building Services Industry.
- Gordon Grier Thomson Masterton, Vice-President, Environment Business Centre, Jacobs Engineering Group Inc. For services to Civil Engineering in Scotland.
- Carolyn McCall, Chief Executive, Guardian Media Group plc. For services to Women in Business.
- Professor Robert John McClelland, Consultant Psychiatrist, Belfast City Hospital and Emeritus Professor of Mental Health, Queen's University Belfast. For services to Medicine.
- Alan Moore McCulla, Chief Executive, Anglo-North Irish Fish Producers' Organisation. For services to the Fishing Industry and to the community in Northern Ireland.
- Hamish George McDonald. For public and voluntary service to Maritime Safety.
- Ciaran Michael McGuigan, Head of Examinations and Assessment, National Policing Improvement Agency.
- Catherine McKeever, Quality Director, Bombardier Aerospace, Belfast. For services to Industry in Northern Ireland.
- Carmel McKinney, Principal, Vere Foster Primary School. For services to Education in Northern Ireland.
- Janet McTeer, Actor. For services to Drama.
- Dr. Azra Meadows. For services to UK and International Community Relations.
- Trevor John Millington, Senior Lawyer, Revenue and Customs Prosecutions Office.
- Merron Mitchell, Director of Offender Learning, City College Manchester. For services to Education and Skills.
- Dr. Abdalla Yassin Mohamed. For services to Community Relations in Wales.
- Dr. Julia Kay Moore, Consultant Anaesthetist, Wirral Hospital Trust and Senior Medical Officer, Strategic Medical Workforce Issues. For services to Medicine and to the community in Merseyside.
- Judith Helen Moorhouse, Chair, General Teaching Council for England. For services to Education.
- Professor Anne Moran, Dean, Faculty of Social Sciences, University of Ulster. For services to Higher Education in Northern Ireland.
- Colin Steel Morgan, Managing Director, Ethicon. For services to the Medical Devices Industry.
- Frederick David Morgan, lately Chair, England and Wales Cricket Board. For services to Cricket.
- Hilary Alexandra Morrell, Headteacher, Dounby Community School. For services to Education and to the community in Orkney.
- Peter John Morris, Chief Executive Officer, University Hospital of South Manchester NHS Foundation Trust. For services to Healthcare.
- Karl Albert Napieralla, Director of Education, Leisure and Lifelong Learning, Neath Port Talbot Council. For services to Education in Wales.
- Sara Catherine Nathan, lately Chair, Ofcom Fairness Committee. For services to Broadcasting and to the Communications Industry.
- Anthony Arthur Nichols, Secretary to the Advisory Committee on Business Appointments, Cabinet Office.
- Patricia Niner, Senior Lecturer, Centre for Urban and Regional Studies, University of Birmingham. For public and voluntary service to Social Issues.
- Mutale Rose Nyoni, Chair, Care Council for Wales. For services to Social Care and to the Voluntary Sector in Wales.
- Maurice O'Neill, Editor, Ballymena Guardian. For services to Journalism in Northern Ireland.
- Professor Magdalene Anyango Namakhiya Odundo, Ceramicist. For services to Art.
- Richard Charles Orrin, Senior Policy Adviser, Aviation Security, Department for Transport.
- Professor Michael David Osbaldeston, Director, Cranfield School of Management. For services to national and international Higher Education.
- John Nicholas Page, lately Chair, Home-Grown Cereals Authority. For services to the Cereals and Oilseeds Industry and to the Voluntary Sector.
- Eileen Margaret Patching, Grade 7, HM Revenue and Customs. For public and voluntary service.
- Don Paterson, Poet. For services to Literature.
- Dr. Michael Charles Paterson, Consultant Clinical Psychologist. For services to Healthcare in Northern Ireland.
- Jane Scott Paul, Chief Executive, Association of Accounting Technicians. For services to the Accountancy Profession.
- Margaret Ann Peggie, Chair, British Sports Trust and Vice-President, Central Council of Physical Recreation. For services to Fitness, Dance and Sport.
- Dr. James Michael Penman, Head of Response Strategies Branch, Climate, Energy and Ozone Science and Analysis Division, Department for Environment, Food and Rural Affairs.
- The Reverend Sybil Theodora Phoenix, MBE. For services to the community in Lewisham, South London.
- Maureen Piggot, Director, MENCAP (Northern Ireland). For services to People with Learning Disabilities.
- Rachel Pinter, Headteacher, Yesodey Hatorah Senior Girls' School, Hackney. For services to Education in London.
- David Thomas Prest, County Adviser for Design and Technology, Cornwall County Council. For services to local and national Design and Technology Education.
- Dr. Colin Price. For public service and for services to Business.
- David John Price. For services to Music Education.
- Dorothy Rose Purdew, Chair, Champneys. For services to the Health Spa Industry and to Charity.
- Mark Radcliffe, DL, Chair, Youth Options. For services to Young People and to the community in Hampshire.
- James Blair Raeburn. For services to the Scottish Newspaper Industry.
- Dr. Katherine Rake, Director, Fawcett Society. For services to Equal Opportunities.
- Gladys Rhodes, Deputy Director for Children's Services, Blackburn with Darwen Borough Council. For services to Social Care.
- Councillor George Edward Richards. For services to Local Government and to the community in Solihull, West Midlands.
- Steve Riley, Information Technology Strand Manager, The Pension Service. For public and voluntary service.
- Lesley Christine Rimmer, Chief Executive, United Kingdom Home Care Association. For services to Older People and to Social Care.
- Paul Roberts, Chair, Creative and Cultural Education Advisory Board. For services to Education and to the Creative Industries.
- Professor Brian Turnbull Robson, Director, Centre for Urban Policy Studies, University of Manchester. For services to Urban Regeneration.
- Elizabeth Robson, Managing Director, Robson Builders (Hexham) Ltd. For services to the Construction Industry, to Women in Business and to the community in the North East.
- Dr. Susan Rowlands, lately General-Secretary, Immigration Law Practitioners Association. For services to Human Rights.
- Martin Frank Rudduck, lately Head, UK Chemical Weapons Convention National Authority, Department for Business, Enterprise and Regulatory Reform.
- Anthony Norman Salter. For public and voluntary service to Older People and to the community in the West Midlands.
- Alfred Charles Shedden. For services to the Voluntary Sector in Scotland.
- Brian Sibbald. For services to Local Government and to the community in Edinburgh.
- Sarah Sillars, Chief Executive, Institute of the Motor Industry. For services to Skills Training and to the Automotive Retail Industry.
- Edward Sirr, lately Principal, Bristol Old Vic Theatre School. For services to Drama and to the community in the South West.
- Professor Julia Mary Slingo, Director of Climate Research, National Centre for Atmospheric Science, University of Reading. For services to Environmental and Climate Science.
- Roger John Gladstone Smith, Director, JUSTICE. For services to Human Rights.
- Alan Sommerville, lately Chief Executive, British Gymnastics. For voluntary service to Sport.
- Barry Neil Speker, DL. For services to Business and to the community in Newcastle upon Tyne.
- Professor John Spence, Research Professor, Department of Mechanical Engineering, Strathclyde University. For services to Engineering.
- Professor Kenneth Maurice Spencer. For services to Education and to the voluntary sector in Birmingham.
- Bridget Rosita Stephens, JP, lately Deputy Chief Executive and Chief Nurse, Bradford Teaching Hospitals NHS Foundation Trust. For services to Healthcare.
- Hugh Stewart, Executive Chair, Caledonian Alloys Ltd. For services to Industry.
- Robert William Hardy Strange, Chief Executive, Institution of Occupational Safety and Health. For services to Health and Safety.
- John Surtees, MBE. For services to Motorsport and to Charity.
- Dr. Per Olof Svanberg, Consultant Clinical Psychologist, Sure Start, Sunderland. For services to Infants and their Families.
- Maire Gabrielle Patricia Symons, Headteacher, Bishop Challoner Catholic School, King's Heath, Birmingham. For services to local and regional Education.
- Frances Mary Targett. For voluntary service to the Citizens' Advice Service in Wales.
- Linda Joan Taylor, Career Guidance Practitioner and Chief Executive, Connexions South London. For voluntary and public service to Young People.
- Paul Noel Thornton. For services to the Actuarial Profession.
- Alan Claude Tolhurst. For voluntary service to the community in South Yorkshire.
- Nigel John Turner, Director of Human Resources, Royal Free Hampstead NHS Trust. For services to the NHS and to the community in London.
- Dr. Walter Harold William Tuttlebee, Chief Executive, Mobile VCE. For services to the Telecommunications Industry.
- Sandra Anne Verkuyten, Chief Executive and Registrar, Hearing Aid Council. For services to Healthcare and to the community in London and Essex.
- Professor Sylvia Walby, Professor of Sociology, Lancaster University. For services to Equal Opportunities and to Diversity.
- Rhiannon Ellis Walker, President, Special Educational Needs Tribunal for Wales. For services to Education and to the community in North Wales.
- Reginald Watson, County Councillor and Chair, Cumbria Police Authority. For services to the Police and to the community in Cumbria.
- John Arthur Webster, Traffic and Road Safety Manager, London Borough of Hillingdon. For services to Local Government.
- Amelia Lindsey Wharmby, Education Consultant, Association of School and College Leaders. For services to Education.
- David John Whiting, Chartered Tax Adviser. For public service.
- Hugh Richard Vaughan Morgan-Williams, Chair, Canford Group plc. For services to Business in the North East.
- John Valentine Williams, lately Director Qualifications and Curriculum Group, Welsh Assembly Government. For public and voluntary service.
- Roy Samuel Williams, Playwright. For services to Drama.
- Professor Louise Janet Wilson. For services to Education and to the Fashion Industry.
- Julian Woolfson, Chair of Governors, Ravensbourne College of Design and Communication, London. For voluntary service to Higher Education.
- Mark Worrall, Leader, Tonbridge and Malling Borough Council. For public and voluntary service to Local Government.
- Dr. Timothy Wreghitt, Regional Microbiologist, Health Protection Agency, East of England. For services to National Health Virology Service Provision.
- David John Yeandle, Deputy Director of Employment Policy, EEF. For services to Engineering and Manufacturing Employers.

Diplomatic Service and Overseas List

- David William Alderdice, lately Director, British Council, Iraq.
- Victoria Elizabeth Billing, Deputy Consul General, British Consulate-General Jerusalem.
- Hazel Cameron, lately First Secretary (Civil Justice and Rights), Office of the UK Permanent Representative to the European Union, Brussels.
- David Gratton Campbell. For services to education and development in East Africa.
- Dr. George William Hunter Cautherley. For services to public policy development in Hong Kong.
- Gillian Angela Dare, lately First Secretary Political, British Embassy, Harare.
- Paul Tobias Doubleday, Director, British Council, Syria.
- Stephen John Richard Gilman. For services to British commercial interests in Asia.
- Alison Jill Gordon, First Secretary, Foreign and Commonwealth Office.
- Mark Timothy Bundy Gore, Head of Education, British Council, Delhi.
- Dr. David Michael Haines, First Secretary, Foreign and Commonwealth Office.
- Dr. Derek Charles Hathaway. For services to charitable interests in the UK.
- Angus Francis Jackson. For reconstruction efforts in Southern Iraq.
- Professor Judith Mary Longstaff MacKay, MBE. For services to tobacco control in Asia.
- James McGilligan. For services to social causes and the use of alternative energy in rural communities in India.
- Paul David Noon, lately Deputy Head of Mission, British Embassy Kinshasa.
- Vandana Saxena Poria. For services to British trade and investment in India.
- John Richard Richardson. For services to British business interests in Libya.
- John Edward Ryan. For services to business interests and the community in Montserrat.
- Ian Paul Simmons, Counsellor, Foreign and Commonwealth Office.
- Emma Morgan Sky, MBE, lately Political Adviser to the Commander of Multi-national Corps—Iraq. For services to UK-Iraq and UK-US relations.
- Professor Glyndwr Alan Vale. For services to controlling and eradicating tsetse flies in Africa.
- Alexander Eric Vines, Founding Head of the Africa Programme, Royal Institute of International Affairs.
- Mark William Wardle, First Secretary, Foreign and Commonwealth Office.
- Peter Michael Wentworth. For services to British commercial interests in Malaysia.
- Anna Wintour, Editor in Chief of Vogue USA. For services to British journalism and British fashion in the USA.

==== Member of the Order of the British Empire (MBE) ====
Military Division

Royal Navy

- Warrant Officer Class 1 Engineering Technician (Marine Engineering) Anthony Craig Butler, D160402S.
- Chief Petty Officer Warfare Specialist (Abovewater Warfare Weapons) Reginald David Ferguson, D114708V.
- Lieutenant Commander Mark Finn, Royal Naval Reserve (Combined Cadet Force).
- Warrant Officer Class 2 Kevin John Green, Royal Marines, P033372U.
- Warrant Officer Class 1 (Underwater Warfare) Peter Thomas Bartlett-Horwood, D166171K.
- Major Gwyn Jenkins, Royal Marines.
- Lieutenant Commander Robert David Lintern.
- Captain Paul Ernest Nolan, Royal Marines.
- Warrant Officer Class 2 Air Engineering Technician Terence Andrew Parnell, D193943R.
- Lieutenant Commander Ian James Pears.
- Warrant Officer Class 1 (Survey Recorder) Michael Jeremy Slater, D149050H.

Army

- Major Paul Leslie Baker (547373) Adjutant General's Corps (Military Provost Staff Branch).
- 24718307 Warrant Officer Class 2 Andrew Bishop, Adjutant General's Corps (Royal Military Police).
- Captain Ian Booth (559094), The Royal Logistic Corps.
- Acting Lieutenant Colonel Marjorie Cameron (517356), Army Cadet Force.
- Captain Patrick John Carley (564412), Royal Corps of Signals.
- Major Richard Anthony Collins (525347), The Royal Logistic Corps.
- 24154432 Warrant Officer Class 2 Kenneth John Cooper, The Parachute Regiment, Territorial Army.
- Captain Maureen Linda Coshall (564178), Queen Alexandra's Royal Army Nursing Corps.
- Major Gareth Andrew Rosser Davies (533767), The Royal Welsh.
- 24498253 Warrant Officer Class 1 John Dawson, The Rifles.
- Major Sundeep Dhillon (540848), Royal Army Medical Corps.
- Major Phillip Evans (545662), Adjutant General's Corps (Staff and Personnel Support Branch).
- Acting Major Simon Beaufort Fraser (487833), Army Cadet Force.
- Major Steven David Fraser (533072), Royal Regiment of Artillery.
- Captain Simon Charles Hale (563352), The Princess of Wales's Royal Regiment.
- Major David Patrick Hall (553031), Coldstream Guards.
- Major Andrew John Hanna (539572), Corps of Royal Engineers.
- Major James John Haughie (549740), The Royal Regiment of Scotland.
- Acting Captain Peter William Hawker (505090), Army Cadet Force.
- 24775130 Warrant Officer Class 1 James Darren Hicks, Adjutant General's Corps (Staff and Personnel Support Branch).
- 25010406 Warrant Officer Class 2 Khalid Iqbal Hussain, The Royal Logistic Corps.
- 24525091 Warrant Officer Class 2 Gordon Paul Hyatt, The Rifles, Territorial Army.
- 24791565 Warrant Officer Class 2 Michael James Isted, The Princess of Wales's Royal Regiment.
- Captain Mark Richard Kitching (560399), Life Guards.
- 24660652 Colour Sergeant Bryn Martin John Knowles, The Mercian Regiment.
- 25031456 Sergeant Darren Adrian Larham, The Royal Logistic Corps.
- Major David John Law (552993), Royal Regiment of Artillery.
- Major Andrew Paul Layton (532057), The Mercian Regiment.
- Major Daniel McCreesh (531165), Corps of Royal Electrical and Mechanical Engineers.
- 24872977 Warrant Officer Class 2 Neil John Mitchell, Royal Corps of Signals.
- Lieutenant Colonel Alan John Lindsay Moore (502667), Royal Army Medical Corps, Territorial Army.
- Major Clive Osborne (530628), The Royal Logistic Corps.
- Major Alexander McLay Rennie (541684), The Royal Regiment of Scotland.
- Captain Stuart Douglas Samson (557855), The Royal Regiment of Scotland.
- Major Nigel Anthony Sherwood (547231), Corps of Royal Electrical and Mechanical Engineers.
- Major Mark Russell McKay Lindsay-Smith (550995), Adjutant General's Corps (Staff and Personnel Support Branch).
- Captain Scott Smith (24670736), Royal Army Medical Corps.
- Major Andrew Prescott Speed (539710), Scots Guards.
- Major Dean John Stefanetti (551195), The Royal Anglian Regiment.
- Acting Captain Alexander Stirling (549721), Army Cadet Force.
- Lieutenant Colonel Andrew John Walker Stuart (533951), Corps of Royal Electrical and Mechanical Engineers.
- Captain Robert James Stuart (24772681), The Royal Regiment of Scotland.
- Major James William Taylor (540546), The Royal Regiment of Fusiliers.
- Major Joseph Edmund Tester (551230), Intelligence Corps.
- 24845058 Warrant Officer Class 2 Simon Kenneth Turner, The Parachute Regiment.
- Major Arthur Kenneth John Norman-Walker (517307), The Rifles, Territorial Army.
- Captain Zoë Katharine White (554387), Royal Corps of Signals.
- Major Mark Henry Graham Whittle (539063), Royal Regiment of Artillery.
- Acting Major Brian Richard Young (536991), Army Cadet Force.

Royal Air Force

- Squadron Leader James Rupert Elwine Ankers (5207367B).
- Flight Lieutenant Mervyn John Ashe (P8135386).
- Wing Commander Jeremy John Attridge (8304188T).
- Flight Lieutenant Philip Martin Anthony Baker (P8124187).
- Squadron Leader Robert William Barrett (8029430L).
- Flight Sergeant Robert Nesbit Blain (S8136322).
- Squadron Leader Anthony Brown (8300486D).
- Warrant Officer John Edbrooke (D8134632).
- Squadron Leader Alexander Graham Gordon (2630591F).
- Warrant Officer Robert William Hargreaves (K8095638).
- Warrant Officer Maurice Howard (B8184454).
- Warrant Officer Jack Alexander MacFarlane (R8209925).
- Flight Lieutenant Barry Matthews (B8173103).
- Flight Lieutenant Stuart Ian Reeks (5206449K).
- Squadron Leader Ross Piers Richards (2643046L).
- Flight Sergeant Colin Stanley Yates (H8151103).
- Squadron Leader Richard James Yates (5206428F).

Civil Division

- Sonia Coode-Adams. For services to the Contemporary Arts and to the community in Essex.
- Marilyn Lesley Addis. For voluntary service to the community in Long Ashton, Bristol.
- Walé Adeyemi, Designer. For services to the Fashion Industry.
- Shaukat Ahmed, Chair, Action for Business (Bradford) Ltd. For services to the community of Bradford, West Yorkshire.
- Catherine Ann Aiken. For voluntary service to Oxfam in Ballymena, Northern Ireland.
- James Akers. For voluntary service to Tulip Horticulture.
- Dr. Angela Mary Alexander, Governor, College of Pharmacy Practice. For services to Pharmacy Practice, Education and to the Voluntary Sector.
- Stephen John Allen, Governor Dogs, Security Group, HM Prison Service.
- Victor Grant Allison, Deputy Managing Director, Wychavon District Council. For services to Local Government and to the community in Worcestershire.
- Janet Christine Anderson. For voluntary service to Oxfam GB in Wallingford, Oxfordshire.
- Margaret Anne Anderson, Pension Centre Manager, Stockport, The Pension Service, Department for Work and Pensions.
- Michael Frederick Andrews. For voluntary service to the community in Twyford, Hampshire.
- Christine Anthony. For services to Music in Guernsey.
- Eleanor, Countess of Arran, DL. For voluntary service to the community in Devon.
- Geoffrey Paul Arrowsmith, lately HM Specialist Inspector of Health and Safety (Fire Inspector), Health and Safety Executive.
- Joan Mary Ashton, JP, DL, lately Deputy Leader, Boston Borough Council. For services to Local Government and to the community in the East Midlands.
- Parveiz Aslam. For services to the community in Chesham, Buckinghamshire.
- Peter Atkinson. For services to the community in Doncaster, South Yorkshire.
- Michele Elise Attfield, Director, Freed of London Ltd. For services to the Manufacturing Industry and to Dance.
- Phyllis May Avery, President, England Netball. For voluntary service to Netball.
- Ken Avis, Inspector, Special Movement, British Transport Police. For services to the Police.
- Gillian Aylott. For voluntary service to the communities of Upper Dean and Shelton, Cambridgeshire.
- Peter Desmond Backhouse. For voluntary service to the Cubs and Scouts in Cardiff.
- Richard Baggaley, Grade C1, Ministry of Defence.
- William George Baillie. For voluntary service to Brass Band Music in Scotland.
- Christopher James Baker, Chair, Audit Committee, Training and Development Agency for Schools. For services to Education and Business.
- Patricia Ann Baker, Executive Officer, Child Support Agency. For public and voluntary service.
- Martyn Thomas Noel Barnsley, Principal Officer, HM Prison Hull.
- John Charles Barwick. For services to Banking and to Charity.
- Sherma Batson, Member, Stevenage Borough Council. For services to Local Government and to the community in Hertfordshire.
- Maureen Roberta Batty. For services to the Licensed Trade Charity.
- The Reverend Peter Ward Beaman. For voluntary service to the community in Merseyside.
- Dr. Robert Bearman, Archivist, Shakespeare Birthplace Trust. For services to Heritage.
- Barbara Beauchamp, Governor, Wray Common Primary School, Reigate. For voluntary service to Education and to the community in Redhill, Surrey.
- Keith Beaumont, Chair, Braunstone Community Association. For services to the Regeneration of Leicester.
- Erinma Bell, Chair, Community Alliance for Renewal, Inner South Manchester Area. For voluntary service to the community in Manchester.
- Jane Meta Bell. For services to Music and to the community in Cookstown, Northern Ireland.
- Margery Megan Bennett. For services to the Voluntary Sector in Herefordshire and Worcestershire.
- Gwendolene Berry. For services to Animal Welfare and to the community in Sheffield.
- Robert Frank Berry, Footpath Work Officer, Ramblers' Association. For voluntary service to Footpath Access in the Mendip Hills.
- Philip Anthony Andrew Bianco, Leader, Rugby Gateway Club. For voluntary service to People with Learning Disabilities.
- Colin Biggs. For voluntary service to the community in Barrow-in-Furness, Cumbria.
- Melvyn John Birch. For services to the NHS in Shropshire.
- Ian David Bithell, Retained Duty System Watch Manager. For services to Local Government and to the community in Wrexham.
- Catherine Black. For services to Nursing and to the community in Coatbridge, Lanarkshire.
- Robert John Blackman, National Secretary for Construction, T & G Section of Unite the Union. For services to improving Occupational Health and Safety.
- Marigold Deirdre Blackwell. For voluntary service to Malvern Theatres in Worcestershire.
- Susan Blake, Chair, Essex Children's Fund. For services to Children and Families.
- Jean Emilie Bland. For voluntary service to the community in Tyersal, West Yorkshire.
- Yvonne Bobb, Policy Analyst, Workforce Pay and Pensions Team, HM Treasury.
- Robert Boustead, Leader, Cleveland Hall Community Association, Gateshead. For voluntary service to Young People in Tyne and Wear.
- Henry Bradley, Chair and Coach, Belfry Youth Football Team. For voluntary service to Young People and to Sport in Liverpool.
- Hilary Bradt. Chair, Bradt Travel Guides Ltd. For services to the Tourist Industry and to Charity.
- Sandra Breen. For services to Mary Ward Adult Education Centre and to the community in Holborn, London.
- Andrew Brettle. For voluntary service to the community in Thornton, Leicestershire.
- Sharon Breward, Infant Feeding Specialist, North West Wales NHS Trust. For services to Infant Feeding.
- Richard John Briers, Detective Sergeant, South Yorkshire Police. For services to the Police and to Charity.
- Jackie Brierton. For services to Women's Enterprise.
- Angela Mary Briggs. For voluntary service to the community in Puttenham, Surrey.
- Patricia Doris Brittain. For voluntary service to the community in Deddington, Oxfordshire.
- Daphne Sylvia Bromley. For services to the British Red Cross Society in Buckinghamshire.
- Major Raymond George Brooks, Grade C2, Ministry of Defence.
- Andrew Brown. For charitable services.
- Audrey Brown. For voluntary service to the Royal British Legion in the Isle of Man.
- Austin Guy Morse-Brown, Founder, Wombourne School of Millinery. For services to the Millinery Industry and to Skills Training.
- James William Brown. For services to Scottish Heritage, the Highland Games and to Charity.
- June Muriel Brown, Actor. For services to Drama and to Charity.
- Margaret Lonsdale Brown. For charitable services to the community in Burgh-by-Sands, Cumbria.
- Alexandra Buchan, Neighbourhood Renewal Officer, Greater West Team Belfast Regeneration Office, Department for Social Development, Northern Ireland Executive.
- Kevin Buck. For voluntary service to WaterAid.
- Gloria Eleanor Buckley, Member, Norfolk Gypsy and Traveller Liaison Group. For services to Community Relations.
- Marie Ann Buckley, Executive Officer, Jobcentre Plus, Department for Work and Pensions.
- Dorothy Bulled. For services to the community in Maesgeirchen, Bangor, Gwynedd.
- Mary Burd, lately Director of Therapies, East London and City Mental Health Trust and Head of Psychology, Tower Hamlets. For services to Healthcare in East London.
- Alfred Peter Paul Burden. For voluntary service to the Malaya and Borneo Veterans' Association.
- Margaret Burke, Officer, Dundee Contact Centre, HM Revenue and Customs. For public and voluntary service.
- Molly Margaret Burkett, Author. For services to Animal Welfare in Lincolnshire.
- Ann MacDonald Burn, Chair, Moredun Community Association. For voluntary service to the community in Moredun, Fernieside and Craigour, South Edinburgh.
- Celia Burn, lately Parental Involvement Co-ordinator for Scotland. For services to Education.
- Professor Alan Kenneth Burnett, Head of The Department of Haematology, Cardiff University School of Medicine. For services to Medicine.
- Doreen Burns, Staff Officer, Personnel Division, Department for Regional Development, Northern Ireland Executive. For public and voluntary service.
- Kenneth Cyril Butcher. For voluntary service to Sport in Hampshire.
- Brian William Butler, Director, Resource and Operations, Centre for Ecology and Hydrology, Natural Environment Research Council. For services to Environmental Science.
- Thomas John Butler, JP, Technical and Information Specialist, Cabinet Office. For public and voluntary service.
- Linda Cairncross, Administrative Officer, Child Support Agency. For public and voluntary service.
- Penelope Ritchie Calder. For services to Museums and to the Voluntary Sector.
- Ian Campbell. For services to the Pig Industry and to the Voluntary Sector.
- Roy Canham. For services to Heritage in Wiltshire.
- Paula Carpenter. For services to Disabled People in Carmarthenshire.
- Janet Carter. For services to the Carter School of Dance and to the community in Hertford.
- Michael Cashin, Operations Manager, PAYE and Processing Office, Rochdale, HM Revenue and Customs.
- Edward Cassidy, lately Chair, East Midlands Regional Cultural Consortium, Culture East Midlands. For services to the Arts.
- Dorothy May Charles. For voluntary service to the community in Leicestershire.
- Robert Chicken, Founder, R. J. Chicken & Sons. For services to the Cycle Industry.
- Margaret Curtis Chorlton. For services to Young People through the Woodmansterne Operatic and Dramatic Society in Surrey.
- Angela Christopher, Manager E, HM Prison Wormwood Scrubs. For public and voluntary service.
- Peter William Clare, Foundation Governor, The New Rosary Catholic Primary School, Hounslow, Middlesex. For voluntary service to Education.
- Alan Macdonald Clark, Member, Dartford Community Fundraising Committee, Cancer Research UK. For charitable services.
- Ernest Clark. For services to Hopefield Animal Sanctuary, Brentwood, Essex.
- Paula Clark. For services to Hopefield Animal Sanctuary, Brentwood, Essex.
- Councillor George Kenneth Cleary, Chair, National Association of Local Councils. For services to Local Government and to the community in Merseyside.
- Sheila Coates. For services to Women's Issues and to the community in South Essex.
- Dr. Sarah Elizabeth Cohen. For voluntary service to Older People in Angus.
- Marcelle Anita Cook, Headteacher, Bedwas High School. For services to Education in Caerphilly.
- Jill Cooper, Head Occupational Therapist, Royal Marsden Hospital. For services to the Allied Health Professions in the South East.
- Keith Copeland, Improvement Engineer, One NorthEast Regional Development Agency. For services to Skills Training.
- Peter Cousins. For services to People with Disabilities in West Lancashire.
- David Stephen Cox, lately Chief Executive, Surrey Council for Voluntary Youth Services. For voluntary services to Young People.
- Susan Yvonne Elise Coyne. For services to Children and Young People in Bridgnorth, Shropshire.
- Andrea Craig, Group Leader, Sunny Days Playgroup, Redcar. For services to Children and Families.
- Carole Cressey, Director, Contact Services at Families Forward, Leeds. For services to Children and Families.
- Robert Martin Crooks. For voluntary service to the community in Guildford, Surrey.
- Raymond Grant Cumin. For voluntary service to People with Learning Disabilities in Cheshire.
- James Currie, JP, Chair, Northern Ireland Guardian ad Litem. For services to Disadvantaged Young People in Northern Ireland.
- Laurence Joseph Curry. For voluntary service to the Cheshire Yeomanry Association.
- David Curtis, Executive Director of Nursing and Organisational Development, Pennine Care NHS Trust. For services to Healthcare in Greater Manchester.
- Derek George Curtis. For voluntary service to Community Transport in Plymouth.
- Michael Charles Damms, Chief Executive, East Lancashire Chamber of Commerce. For services to Business in the North West.
- Sharon Nicola Daniels. For charitable services in Warwickshire.
- Dr. James Hunter Danskin, Sustainable Energy Policy Analyst, Department for Environment, Food and Rural Affairs. For public and voluntary service.
- Jane Darby. For voluntary service to the community in Sheffield, South Yorkshire.
- Naghma Darr. For public service.
- Elaine Margaret Davey. For voluntary service to the Girl Guides in Nottinghamshire.
- Lieutenant Colonel Eric William Davidson, DL. For voluntary service to the community in Lancashire.
- Dr. Sarah Davidson. For services to the British Red Cross Society.
- Celia Davies, Artistic Director, Peckleton Arts. For services to Music in Leicestershire.
- Godfrey William Davis, Chair of Hereford and Worcester Fire and Rescue Authority. For services to Local Government.
- Mark James Davison. For services to the community in Gloucestershire.
- Sandra Dawe, Director, Strategy and Communications, VisitBritain. For services to the Tourist Industry.
- George Steven Dawes. For voluntary service to Abbeyfield, Irvine and District Society and to the community in Dundonald, Ayrshire.
- John Dawson. For voluntary service to the community in Lemington, Newcastle upon Tyne.
- Esther Deans, Chair, Management Committee, Support Against Racist Incidents. For voluntary service to Community Relations.
- Pamela Dennis. For services to Visually Impaired People in South East Wales.
- Samatiben Desai, Link Worker, Royal Bolton Hospital. For services to Social Care.
- Eileen Mary Devenish. For voluntary service to the community in Burbage, Marlborough, Wiltshire.
- Balraj Singh Dhesi. For services to the NHS and to the community in Warwickshire.
- Brian Dickens, Director of Lambeth and Southwark Sport Action Zone. For services to Community Sport in London.
- George Hickman Digweed, Clay Pigeon Target Shooter. For services to Sport and to Charity.
- Mark Alexander Albert Dilliway, Constable, City of London Police. For services to the Police.
- Edward Dillon, Commissionaire, Clatterbridge Centre for Oncology NHS Foundation Trust. For services to Healthcare in Merseyside and Cheshire.
- Maureen Denise Rusk Disson, Administrator, Health and Safety Executive.
- Norman John Richard Dixon, Inspector, Lothian and Borders Police. For services to the Police.
- Madge Esmé Mary Dobinson. For services to the British Red Cross Society in London.
- Barbara Ruby Doherty. For voluntary service to Isabel Hospice, Hertfordshire.
- Philip Dolan. For voluntary service to Haemophiliacs in Scotland.
- Dr. Christine Hazel Douglas, Head of Child Psychology Department, Solihull NHS Care Trust. For services to Children and Families.
- Keith Downing, Grade C2, Ministry of Defence.
- Dr. Leslie Ernest Drain. For voluntary service to the Environment in South Oxfordshire.
- Eleanor Draper. For services to the Voluntary Sector in Wallasey, Cheshire.
- Eunice Dunkley, lately Head, National Association of Probation and Bail Hostels. For services to Disadvantaged People.
- Gary Hugh Dutton, Chair, Synseal Holdings Ltd and Synseal Extrusions Ltd. For services to the Manufacturing Industry in Nottingham.
- Marjorie Catherine Chrissie East. For voluntary service to HM Prison and Young Offenders' Institution Reading.
- Gillian Edwards. For voluntary service to the community in Overseal, Derbyshire.
- Simon Barrington William Edwards, JP. For voluntary service to the Administration of Justice and to the community in Leicester.
- Stanley Edward Eldon, Chair, English Federation of Disability Sport in the South East. For voluntary service to Athletics.
- Christopher William Elliott, Higher Officer, Processing, South Directorate, HM Revenue and Customs.
- Dr. Peter Richard Elliott, lately General Medical Practitioner. For services to Healthcare and to the community in Suffolk.
- Bryan John Emery. For voluntary service to the Royal British Legion in Essex.
- John Emsley, Executive Officer, Disability and Carers' Service, Department for Work and Pensions. For public and voluntary service.
- Anthony Eustance. For services to Education and to Young People in Liverpool and Cheshire.
- David William Evans, Chair, Grass Roots Group plc. For services to Corporate Social Responsibility.
- Dee Evans, Chair, a:gender—Civil Service Diversity Network, Home Office.
- Gillian Evans. For voluntary service to the community in Dorset.
- Jillian Evans, Producer, National Video Archive of Performance, Victoria and Albert Museum Theatre Collections. For services to Arts Heritage.
- The Reverend Canon Robert Arthur Evans. For voluntary service to the Maritime Industry in Merseyside.
- Susan Ann Evans, Head of Development, Central Scotland Forest Trust. For services to Forestry.
- Charles John Fairbrass, Leader, London Borough of Barking and Dagenham. For services to Local Government.
- Dr. Kieran Fallon, General Dental Practitioner. For services to the NHS and to the community in Glasgow.
- Zahida Fazaley, Witness Care Officer, Bury, Crown Prosecution Service.
- Marianne Fellowes. For services to Domestic Violence issues in Suffolk.
- Christine Ann Fergusson. For voluntary service to Sport and to the community in Newark, Nottinghamshire.
- Andrew Thomas Festing, President, Royal Society of Portrait Painters. For services to Art.
- John Fiddy, Chair, Norfolk Zipper Club. For charitable services to Cardiac Patients.
- Dr. Sheila Ernestine Filshie, JP. For services to the Administration of Justice in Nottinghamshire.
- Michael David Finn, Chair, Building Regulations Advisory Committee. For services to Building Standards.
- Bridget Mary Fitzgibbon, Deputy Court Manager, Birkenhead County Court, HM Courts Service. For public and voluntary service.
- Julie Fleeting. For services to Women's Football.
- Anne Pearson Fleming. For services to the British Red Cross in Lothian.
- Justin Fletcher, Television Presenter. For services to Children's Broadcasting and to the Voluntary Sector.
- John Owen Foulkes, Deputy Head Teacher, St. Margaret's Church of England High School, Liverpool. For services to Education and to the community in Tuebrook.
- Robert Martyn Richmond Fox. For voluntary service to the community in Norfolk.
- Alison Frankland. For voluntary service to Swimming in Guernsey.
- Christine Elizabeth Fretten, Librarian, House of Commons.
- Alexandra Frith. For services to the Performing Arts, Young People and to Charity in Swansea.
- Neil Froggett, Day Centre Officer, Langdale Centre, Blackpool Borough Council. For services to Local Government and to the Voluntary Sector.
- Sister Christine Frost. For voluntary service to Children, Older Adults and to the community in Poplar, East London.
- Timothy William Frost, Solicitor. For services to the Criminal Justice System in Cumbria.
- Ena Fry, Young People's Project Manager, Fostering Network. For services to Children in Care.
- Ethel Joan Fry. For voluntary service to the community in Bury St. Edmunds, Suffolk.
- Jane Fry, Manager of Salisbury Tourist Information Centre. For services to Tourism in the South West.
- Christine Fulton, President, Care of Police Survivors. For voluntary service to the Families of Police Officers who have lost their lives in the line of duty.
- Kate Sandra Fyfe. For services to the Kiltmaking Industry in Scotland.
- Pamela Bridget Galliers. For services to Foster Care and to the community in the London Borough of Merton.
- Jonathan Edwin Gamble, Director for Adults and Lifelong Learning, Learning and Skills Council. For services to Further Education.
- Stephen Geoffrey Gamgee, Chief Executive, The Wallich, Cardiff. For services to Homeless People.
- Mahamad Gardi, Interpreter and Translator, Ministry of Defence.
- Anne Bernice Abdy Gardner. For services to Mental Health through the Crumbs Project in Bournemouth, Dorset.
- Patricia Elaine Gates, Personal Secretary, Health and Safety Executive.
- David Gee. For services to the Police and to the Voluntary Sector.
- Dorothy Olive Gee. For voluntary service to the community in Nottingham.
- Michael Gee. For voluntary service to the community in Nottingham.
- Dr. Brian Albert Gennery, lately Chair, Medical and Healthcare Products Regulation Agency, Independent Scientific Advisory Committee. For services to Public Health and to the Voluntary Sector.
- Satbir Singh Giany, Special Constable, Hampshire Constabulary. For voluntary service to the Police.
- Margaret Gibbings, Manager, St. Kilda Residential Home NHS Care Trust, Brixham, Devon. For services to Social Care in Torbay.
- Matthew Gill. For services to NHS Dentistry.
- David Owen Gillard, Arts and Music Journalist. For services to Journalism and to Charity.
- Gudrun Gilson, Higher Executive Officer, Higher Education Governance Team, Department for Innovation, Universities and Skills.
- Boyd Jamieson Glen. For services to the Lanthorn Community Complex, Livingston, West Lothian.
- Shaista Gohir, Director, Muslim Voice UK and Director, Muslim Women's Network UK. For services to Muslim People and to Community Relations.
- Karin Goodburn, Secretary-General, Chilled Food Association. For services to the Food Industry.
- Donald Gordon. For services to the Trimontium Trust and to the community in Melrose, Scottish Borders.
- Major Alan George Gower. For services to the Army Benevolent Fund in Berkshire.
- Baldev Krishan Goyal. For voluntary services to the community in the London Borough of Havering.
- Lorraine Gradwell, Chief Executive, Breakthrough UK Ltd. For services to Disabled People in Greater Manchester.
- Lieutenant Commander Robert Graham, Royal Naval Reserve (Retd.) For voluntary service to the Sea Cadet Corps in Musselburgh.
- Edward Lawrance Graves. For services to Gamekeeping.
- Margaret Gray, lately Higher Executive Officer, The Pension Service. For public and voluntary service.
- Peter Leonard Griffiths, Director, Salon Culinaire in London and Birmingham. For services to the Hospitality Industry.
- Janice Ann Grigg. For voluntary service to Disabled People in the London Borough of Havering.
- David Alan Grisenthwaite. For voluntary service to the Soldiers', Sailors' and Airmen's Families Association and to the community in Fife.
- Joel Merrien Grunnill, Chair, Lifeboat Management Group, Royal National Lifeboat Institution, Skegness. For voluntary service to Maritime Safety.
- Tanika Gupta, Playwright. For services to Drama.
- Patrick Kevin Hagan, Neighbourhood Manager, Toll Bar, Doncaster Metropolitan Borough Council. For services to Local Government and to the community in Doncaster, South Yorkshire.
- Daisy May Hall. For voluntary service to the community in Abingdon, Oxfordshire.
- Melanie Hall, Regional Director (South West) National Farmers' Union. For services to Animal Welfare and to the community in Gloucestershire.
- Sheila Hamill. For services to the Probation Board for Northern Ireland and to the Voluntary Sector.
- Eric Mansell Hammonds. For charitable services in South Wales.
- Winifred Eileen Hanna, Personnel Manager, Northern Ireland Office.
- Alice Mary Harbey. For voluntary service to the community in Starkholmes, Derbyshire.
- Yvonne Susan Harding, Head of Nursing, North East Wales NHS Trust. For services to Healthcare and to the community in North East Wales.
- Michael James Henry Hardwick, Chair and Chief Executive, Bristol Children's Help Society. For voluntary service to Children and Families.
- Barry Hardy. For voluntary services to Lifelong Learning and to the Open University in Inverness.
- Bridget Harrington, Caretaker and Lunchtime Welfare Supervisor, Sacred Heart Roman Catholic Primary School. For services to Education and to the community in Blackburn.
- John Shannon Harrison. For services to Photography in Northern Ireland.
- Catherine Ann Hart. For voluntary service to Physically Disabled People in Leeds.
- Sheila Maureen Harvey, Librarian, Landscape Institute. For services to Landscape Architecture.
- Dr. Meraj Uddin Hasan, Director, South Wales Managed Clinical Network in Child Adolescent Psychiatry, Pontypridd and Rhondda NHS Trust. For services to Medicine and to the community in South Wales.
- John Howey Hassan. For voluntary service to Young People in Cleveland through the Duke of Edinburgh Award Scheme.
- Desmond David Hasson, Principal, Ballysally Primary School, Coleraine. For services to Education in Northern Ireland.
- Elizabeth Joyce Ann Havard. For services to the community in Neath Port Talbot.
- Gloria Hawkes, Housekeeper, House of Commons.
- John Alexander Hay, Senior Lecturer, Deaf Studies, Wolverhampton University. For services to Higher Education and to Deaf People.
- Robert John Haycock, Senior Reserves Manager, Countryside Council for Wales. For services to Nature Conservation in Pembrokeshire.
- David Jonathan Healy. For services to Football and to the community in Northern Ireland.
- Andrew Somervell Henson, Director, International Projects, National Physical Laboratory. For services to Measurement Science.
- Angela Hesketh, Executive Officer, Jobcentre Plus. For public and voluntary service.
- Jacqueline Edith Heslop. For services to the community in Spennymoor, County Durham.
- Alexander Highlands. For services to the Voluntary Sector in Greater Manchester.
- Sharon Hilditch, Founder, Crystal Clear Beauty. For services to Business.
- Elizabeth Hill. For voluntary service to the community in Northern Ireland.
- Frank Smyth Hill, Human Resources Manager. For services to the Probation Board for Northern Ireland.
- Frances Betty Hinde, lately Deputy Headteacher, Swanley Technology College, Kent. For services to Education and to Vulnerable People.
- Geoffrey Roger Hinde, Teacher, Wirral Grammar School for Boys. For services to Education and to the Performing Arts in Merseyside.
- Christopher Ian Hines. For services to the Environment.
- David Hirst, Group Station Manager, Embankment, London Underground. For services to Public Transport.
- Christopher Neville Hobson. For voluntary service to the community in the East Riding of Yorkshire.
- Maria Hodgkinson, lately Constable, Greater Manchester Police. For services to the Police and to the community in Stalybridge.
- Philip Hodgson, Corporate Director of Community Services, Blaenau Gwent County Borough Council. For services to Local Government.
- Susan Jean Holden. For voluntary service to the community in Oxford.
- Denis Edwin Holliday. For voluntary service to the community in Dorchester, Dorset.
- David Hollingshead, lately Executive Officer, Disability and Carers' Service, Department for Work and Pensions. For public and voluntary service.
- Dr. Margaret Holmes, Chair, North Belfast Senior Citizen's Forum. For voluntary service to the community in Northern Ireland.
- Peter William Holmes. For services to Sport in the West Midlands and to the community in Wolverhampton.
- Christine Alison Holvey, Chief Executive and Project Director, Opportunity Wales. For services to eCommerce for Small Businesses.
- Lee Martin David Hopgood. For services to Animal Welfare in Gloucestershire.
- Lynda Hoskins, Senior Development Worker of FRIEND. For services to Mental Healthcare in North Somerset.
- William Peter Howard, Vice-Chair, Abbeyfield UK (Northern Ireland). For voluntary service to the community in Carrickfergus, Northern Ireland.
- Dennis Hughes. For voluntary service to the community in Blaenau Gwent.
- John Woodward Frederick Hughes. For voluntary service to the community in Chelmsford, Essex.
- Mary Collette Hughes, lately Surgical Ward Manager, Western Health and Social Care Trust, Erne Hospital. For services to Healthcare in Northern Ireland.
- Patricia Pauline Hughes. For services to the Water Industry in the West Midlands.
- Peter Hamish Humphries, lately Interpretation Manager, Cadw, Welsh Assembly Government.
- Peter David Hunt, Senior Water Sanitation Consultant Engineer, Mott MacDonald. For public service.
- Roderick James Hunt. For services to Education, particularly Children's Literacy.
- Zulfiqar Hussain, Chief Executive, Global Synergy Solutions. For services to Business and to Charity in Yorkshire and the Humber.
- Peter Hutchinson. For services to the Insurance Industry and to Charity.
- Charles Hutton, Senior Steward, Edinburgh Castle. For public and voluntary service.
- Mary Huxham. For voluntary service to the community in Princes Park, Liverpool.
- Janette Hynes, Founder and Director, Positive Mental Attitude Football League. For services to Disability.
- Alfred Coutts Ingram. For voluntary service to Mountain Rescue in Scotland.
- Mabel Irving. For services to the Arts in Scotland.
- Huedel Morgan-Isaac, Clinical Lead, Midwifery Led Unit, Llandough Hospital, Cardiff and Vale NHS Trust. For services to Healthcare.
- Gillian Jackson, Director, Dyscover. For voluntary service to People with Speech and Language Disabilities.
- Norman George Jacobs, Founder and Managing Director, Jacobs Theatre and Leisure Group Ltd. For services to Business and to Charity in East Anglia.
- Stephen Jagger, Assistant Director (Strategic Housing), Barnsley Metropolitan Borough Council. For services to Local Government and to the community in Barnsley, South Yorkshire.
- Hugh Richard James, Distinguished Specialist and Research Leader, Material Modelling Group, AWE. For services to the Defence Industry.
- Raymond Jeffery. For voluntary service to the Thrapston Town Band and to the community in Thrapston, Northamptonshire.
- Alfred Edward Jenkins. For services to Heritage and to the community in Clee Hill, South Shropshire.
- Myra Gillian Jennings, Chairperson, The Blenheim Project (Bradford and West Yorkshire Methodist Housing Ltd). For voluntary service to the community in Bradford, West Yorkshire.
- Linda Jerman, Administration Officer, The Butts Primary School, Alton, Hampshire. For services to Education.
- Pamela Jervis, Headteacher, Brookfield High Sports College and Chair, Knowsley Community Sports Network. For services to Sports Education.
- Alan Johnson. For services to Vintage and Veteran Vehicle Restoration and Heritage.
- Brian Patrick Johnson, Senior Operational Manager, HM Revenue and Customs.
- Judith Amy Waterlow Jones. For services to Healthcare and to the community in Taunton, Somerset.
- Loretta Janet Jones, Ward Sister, Belfast Health and Social Care Trust, Musgrave Park Hospital and Branch Secretary, Royal College of Nursing. For services to Healthcare.
- Malcolm Brian Jones. For voluntary service to Pen Trade Heritage in Birmingham.
- Peter Thomas Josephs, Outpatient Clerk, Barts and The London NHS Trust. For services to Healthcare and to the community in East London.
- Dr. Prakash Chandra Kakoty, General Medical Practitioner, Barnsley. For services to Healthcare and to the community in South Yorkshire.
- Kulwant Kaur, General Catering Assistant, University of Birmingham. For services to Higher Education and to the community in Birmingham.
- Denise Frances Keenan. For services to the community through the St. Augustine's Centre in Halifax, West Yorkshire.
- George Kelley. For services to Apethorpe Hall, Northamptonshire.
- Aileen Probert Kells. For voluntary service to the Girls' Brigade in Scotland.
- Lynne Marie Kemp. For services to Buckenham Horse Riding for the Disabled Group in Norfolk.
- The Reverend David James Kerr, Chaplain, East Belfast Mission and lately President, Methodist Church in Ireland. For services to the community in Northern Ireland.
- Robin Timothy Kiel, Higher Executive Officer, Music and Dance Scheme Team, Department for Children, Schools and Families.
- Maureen Kiernan. For voluntary service to the community in Catrine, Ayrshire.
- Hilary King, President, World Indoor Bowls Council. For services to Bowls in Wales.
- Alexander Kirk, Deputy Principal, John Wheatley College. For services to Further Education and to the community in Glasgow.
- Captain David Martin Kirkland. For services to the Aviation Industry in the Orkney Islands.
- The Reverend Desmond Robert Kitto, JP. For voluntary service to the community in South Wales.
- Carl Klemm, Deputy Managing Director, Toyota (UK), Deeside. For services to the Automotive Industry and to the community in North Wales.
- Edna Margaret Knight, Founder, Unique Rare Chromosome Disorder Support Group. For voluntary services to People with a Chromosome Disorder and their Families.
- Elizabeth Knowles, lately Director, Newlyn Art Gallery, Cornwall. For services to Art and to Charity.
- Stanley Keith Knowles. For services to the City of London Corporation.
- Alvin Kofi, Examiner, Identity and Passport Service and Chair, Disability Support Network, Home Office. For public and voluntary service.
- Dr. Kumar Jayant Shamrao Kotegaonkar, General Medical Practitioner, Bury. For services to Healthcare and to Education.
- Yuet-Wah Emily Lam-Kwok, Centre Manager, Learndirect Chinese Centre (North of England), Newcastle upon Tyne. For services to Learning and Skills and to the Chinese community in the North East.
- Anthea Vivienne Lacey For services to Pharmacy and to the community in Ashford, Middlesex.
- Lilian Mary Ladle. For services to Archaeology in Wareham, Dorset.
- Robert Lambert, lately Detective Inspector, Metropolitan Police Service. For services to the Police.
- Joseph Ernest Lambton, Estates Manager, St. Vincent's School for Blind and Partially Sighted Children, Liverpool. For services to Education.
- Colin Lang, lately Police Constable, Norfolk Constabulary. For services to the Police and to Young People in Norwich.
- William Lankester. For voluntary service to the community in Sidmouth, Devon.
- Gordon William Lawrence, Assistant Project Manager, HMS Victory Project, Fleet Support Ltd. For services to Naval Heritage.
- Phyllis Lilian Lawrence. For charitable services.
- Dr. Michael Kenneth Lee, lately Director of Geology and Resources, British Geological Survey. For services to Science.
- Gillian Mary Lewis, lately Manager E, HM Prison Bedford.
- Ajibha Linney, Director of Public Health & President, Twins and Multiple Births Association and Vice-President, Woking Community Relations Forum. For services to Healthcare.
- Michael Anthony Linton, Manufacturing Director, NP Aerospace Ltd. For services to the Armed Forces.
- Thomas George Linton, Reserve Constable, Police Service of Northern Ireland. For services to the Police.
- Bernard Mathias Llewellyn. For services to Rural Affairs and to the Tourist Industry in Wales.
- Sally Elizabeth Lloyd, Customer Care Manager, Tribunals Service, Ministry of Justice. For public and voluntary service.
- Hilary Anne Loftus, lately Cook, Framework Housing Association. For services to Homeless People in Nottingham.
- Margaret Joyce Long. For voluntary service to the community in Ley Hill, Buckinghamshire.
- Paula Lovitt, Head of Enquiry Unit and Night Duty Office, Department for Business, Enterprise and Regulatory Reform.
- Raymond Charles Lucas, Gardener, Newman College of Higher Education, Birmingham. For services to Higher Education and to Shire Horses.
- Esther Malvina Ludlam. For voluntary services to Elderly People in Sheffield, South Yorkshire.
- Evelyn Olive Lynn, lately Mealtime Assistant, Stokenham Area Primary School, Devon. For services to Education.
- Nicola Jayne Lyons. For voluntary service to the Search and Rescue Dog Association for England and to Mountain Rescue.
- Scott MacArthur, Office Manager, Baghdad, Department for International Development.
- James Stewart MacKay. For services to the Environment in South East Wales.
- Phillip Reginald Maggs. For voluntary service to Sport and to the community in Llanhilleth and Brynithel, Blaenau.
- Iqubalhusein Ismail Makati, Returns Liaison Officer, Home Office.
- Neil Mantle, Conductor. For services to Music in Scotland.
- Maureen Susie Maplesden, Chair, Buckland Park Play Centre, Portsmouth. For voluntary service to Young People.
- Dr. Michael Francis Marks. For voluntary service to Healthcare in the Third World.
- Violet Joan Marshall. For services to Foster Care in Northern Ireland.
- Kathleen Mary Martin, Private Secretary, The Health and Safety Executive, Department for Work and Pensions.
- John Shane Wellings Massey. For charitable services in the West Midlands.
- Richard Matchett. For services to Dance and to the Heritage of Black Dance.
- Sheila Anne Matthews. For voluntary service to the community in Henfield, West Sussex.
- Elaine Mary Mawson, lately General Manager, Harrogate Hospital. For service to the NHS and to the community in West and North Yorkshire.
- Frank Mayo. For voluntary service to the Boys' Brigade in Cannock, Staffordshire.
- The Reverend Theophilus Augustus McCalla, Chair, Nehemiah Housing Association. For services to the community in the West Midlands.
- Mary Louise McCordick. For voluntary service to the community in Fermanagh, Northern Ireland.
- Mukami Irene Ndegwa McCrum. For services to Community Relations and Human Rights in Scotland.
- Pascal McDonald, Chair, Development Committee, Foyle University of the Third Age. For services to Older People in Northern Ireland.
- Allegra Sarah Bazzett McEvedy, Chef, Restaurateur and Cookery Writer. For services to the Hospitality Industry.
- Hazel Elizabeth McGahey. For voluntary service to Youth Football in South Birmingham.
- Michael Charles McGinnity. For voluntary service to Disadvantaged People in the West Midlands.
- Robert Keith McGowan, Head Waiter, Lloyd's. For services to the Financial Services Industry in London.
- Michael Joseph McGuckin, Chief Executive, Cookstown District Council. For services to Local Government and to the community in Northern Ireland.
- Elizabeth McGurk. For voluntary service to HM Prison and Young Offenders' Institution, Low Newton, Durham.
- John McKechnie, Executive Officer, The Pension Service. For public and voluntary service.
- Ann Scott McLean. For services to People with Disabilities and to the community in Swale, Kent.
- Joan McLoughlin, School Crossing Warden, Knowsley Metropolitan Borough Council. For services to Education in Huyton, Knowsley.
- Dr. Alexander McMinn. For services to the community in Ormskirk, Lancashire.
- Mona McNee, Teacher of Reading and Writing. For voluntary service to Education.
- Gordon McQuilton, Managing Director, Specialised Orthotic Services Ltd. For services to Business.
- Yvonne Annette McVie, Grade D, Ministry of Defence.
- Gerald Rudyard Struan Mee. For voluntary service to Heritage in Leek, Staffordshire.
- Felicity Mendelson, Learning Council Project Manager, Newcastle upon Tyne City Council. For services to Skills Training in Local Government.
- John Russell Metcalfe. For voluntary service to Dorchester Abbey in Oxfordshire.
- Sheila Edith Millard, Vice-President and Archivist, Odiham Society. For voluntary service to the community in Hampshire.
- Ian Kenneth Miller, Commandant, City of London Special Constabulary. For services to the Police in London and Tayside, Scotland.
- Valerie Ann Miller, Subject Librarian, University of Kent. For services to Higher Education.
- Irene Milson. For voluntary service to the community in Princes Park, Liverpool.
- Hemendra Chhaganlal Mistry. For charitable services.
- Winston George Mitchell, Higher Executive Officer, Equality Mainstreaming Team, Department for Children, Schools and Families. For public and voluntary service.
- Colin Mitton, Construction Works Manager, Costain Ltd. For services to Civil Engineering and to Health and Safety.
- Irene Anne Moffett. For voluntary service to the Girls' Brigade in Northern Ireland.
- Andrew David William Moger, Senior Executive Officer, Child Support Agency. For public and voluntary service.
- James Mooney. For services to Disadvantaged and Unemployed People in Scotland.
- Clifford John Moore, Chief Executive, Milibern Trust. For services to Social Housing in Northern Ireland.
- Elizabeth Moore. For voluntary service to the community in Constantine, Cornwall.
- Judith Moore, lately County Court Manager, Sheffield Combined Court Centre, Her Majesty's Courts Service.
- Margaret Moore. For voluntary service to the community in North Anston, South Yorkshire.
- Susan Elizabeth Moore, Telephonist, Qualifications and Curriculum Authority. For services to Education and to Visually Impaired People.
- Elizabeth Ann Morgan, Psychotherapist. For public and voluntary service in Shropshire.
- Anne Vivien Morrison. For services to Agriculture in Northern Ireland.
- John Sidney Mortimer. For services to the Civil Service Benevolent Fund, Department for Work and Pensions and for public and voluntary service.
- David Muirhead. For voluntary service to the Cornish Fishing Industry and to the Marine Environment.
- Tracey Lorraine Mullings, Executive Officer, JobCentre Plus. For public and voluntary service.
- Professor David McKenzie Munro, President, Kinross-shire Civic Trust. For services to the Environment and to the community in Perth and Kinross.
- Elizabeth Annette Murphy, Founder and Chair, Beacon of Hope. For voluntary service to the community in Ceredigion.
- John Haworth Myers. For voluntary service to the community in Lancashire.
- Surina Narula. For charitable services in India.
- Barbara Jean Natasegara, Chief Executive Officer, Safer Wales. For services to the community in Cardiff.
- Doreen Buglass Neil, Teaching Assistant, Lukes Lane Community Primary School, Hebburn, Tyne and Wear. For voluntary service to Education.
- Susan Nelson, Learning and Development Consultant, Maritime and Coastguard Agency.
- Martin Neville, Executive Officer, Child Support Agency. For public and voluntary service.
- Lynda Newman. For services to Stroke Patients in Blackwater Valley, Hampshire.
- John Francis Newnham. For voluntary service to the Royal Marines Association in Shropshire.
- Councillor Robert Gray Newton, MLA, Councillor, Belfast City Council. For services to Local Government and to the community in Northern Ireland.
- Derek Noble, Chair, Wirral Heart Beat. For services to Healthcare and to the community in the Wirral.
- Robert Paterson Noble. For voluntary service to Equestrian Sport in Ayrshire.
- Paul James O'Grady, Comedian and Television Presenter. For services to Entertainment.
- Marion Elizabeth O'Sullivan, Commercial Director, D. J. Murphy (Publishers) Ltd. For services to the Publishing Industry and to Animal Welfare.
- Ann Oldknow, JP. For voluntary services to the community in Leeds, West Yorkshire.
- Professor Christopher Orr, Artist and Head, Printmaking Department, Royal College of Art. For services to Art.
- Myra Orr. For services to the Soldiers', Sailors' and Airmen's Families Association.
- Anastasia Osbourne, Team Leader, Special Projects, Operations Directorate, Department for Business, Enterprise and Regulatory Reform.
- Richard Oscroft. For voluntary service to the community in Essex.
- Patricia Violet Ost. For charitable services.
- Lilian Barbara Ostle, School Secretary, Walesby Church of England Primary School, Newark, Nottinghamshire. For services to Education and to the community in New Ollerton, Nottinghamshire.
- Avril Owton, Hotelier. For services to the Hospitality Industry and to Charity in Hampshire.
- Naana Otoo-Oyortey. For services to Human Rights Issues for Women.
- Lieutenant Colonel Brian Arthur Page. For services to the community in Andover, Hampshire.
- Albert Edward Pallent, Amateur Boxing Trainer. For services to Sport and for voluntary service to the community in Tonbridge, Kent.
- Sandra Park, lately School Crossing Warden, Oxgangs Primary School. For services to Education and to the community in Edinburgh.
- Linda Raymonde-Parker, Manager, Lemon Tree Nursery, Taunton. For services to Early Years Education.
- Rebecca Parker, Head of Physics, Simon Langton Grammar School for Boys, Canterbury. For services to Science and to Education.
- Christopher Parkin, lately Senior Executive Officer, Jobcentre Plus. For public and voluntary service.
- Dr. Colin Howard Parsons, Chief Executive Officer, North and Midlands School of Music. For services to Music Education and to Charity.
- Balwantbhai Dayabhai Unka Patel, President, Hindu Association of Bilston. For services to the community in Wolverhampton.
- Hitesh Kaji Patel. For services to Pharmacy and to the communities in Rothwell and Desborough, Leicestershire.
- Anne Pater, Conductor-in-Charge of Music Performance, The Queen Katherine School, Kendal. For services to Education and to the Voluntary Sector in Cumbria.
- Christopher Pearman, For service to the Voluntary Sector and to Disadvantaged Young People.
- Betty Pauline Pearson. For services to Animal Welfare.
- Wendy Peek. For voluntary service to Visually Impaired Children and Young People in Sussex.
- Catherine Latimer Peers. For services to the Hereford Garrison Play School and Creche.
- Alan Pendlebury. For services to Agriculture in the South West.
- David George Perkins. For voluntary service to the community in Ewhurst Green, East Sussex.
- Ina Elaine Perry, Higher Officer, HM Revenue and Customs.
- Philippa Perry. For services to the Natural Environment and to the community in North East Wales.
- Dr. Richard Edward William Pettifer, Executive Director, Royal Meteorological Society. For services to Science and to the community in Sherborne St. John, Hampshire.
- Laura Clare, Lady Phillips. For voluntary service to Contemporary Dance.
- William John Pike. For services to the Hospitality Industry in Scotland and to Charity.
- David Pinniger, Entomologist. For services to Pest Control and to Museum Conservation.
- David John Pope. For services to School Rugby and Athletics and to the community in Northamptonshire.
- Christopher Anthony George Powell. For services to the community in Starbeck, North Yorkshire.
- Gloria Jean Powell. For voluntary service to the community in Hadleigh, Suffolk.
- David John Pratt, Senior Officer, HM Prison and Young Offenders' Institution New Hall, Wakefield.
- Andrew Graham Priaulx, Racing Driver. For services to Sport and for voluntary service to the community in Guernsey.
- Daphne Anne Price, Governor, Northgate High School, Dereham, Norfolk. For voluntary service to Education.
- Edward Godwin Price, JP, lately President, Gloucester and District Archaeological Group. For voluntary service to Archaeology in Frocester.
- Jack Prime, Higher Officer, HM Revenue and Customs.
- Nicholas James Purdie, Temporary Inspector, Northamptonshire Police. For services to the Police.
- Joan Purves. For voluntary service to the community in Hutton, Berwick-upon-Tweed.
- Saleem Arif Quadri, Artist. For services to Art.
- Sheliagh Ann Ram. For voluntary services to the Samaritans in London.
- Rosemarie Ramsey, Founder and Headteacher, Mount Zion Supplementary School, Lewisham. For services to Education and to the community in South East London.
- Moira Randall, Sergeant, South Wales Police. For services to the Police.
- Jocelyn Rawlence. For voluntary service to the community in Pulham Market, Norfolk.
- Juliet Rawlings, Chair, Tenant Management Organisation. For services to Social Housing.
- Vivienne Rayner, Policy Manager, Federation of Small Businesses. For services to Business in the South West.
- Bernard Rees. For voluntary service to the community in St. Just, Cornwall.
- Leslie Raymond Rees, Councillor, Caerphilly County Borough Council. For services to Local Government and to the community in Caerphilly.
- Cyrille Regis. For services to the Voluntary Sector and to Football.
- Claudine Reid. For services to Social Enterprise and to the community in South London.
- Geoffrey Keith Rennie. For voluntary service to the community in North Yorkshire.
- Peter John Robert Richardson. For services to Foster Care in Hampshire.
- Wendy Diane Richardson. For services to Foster Care in Hampshire.
- John Riley, Chair, Strathfillan Community Council. For voluntary service to the community in Strathfillan, Perthshire.
- Kathleen Rishworth. For voluntary service to the Civil Service Benevolent Fund.
- Peter John Risley. For voluntary service to People with Diabetes.
- David Roberts. For voluntary service to the community in Ottery St. Mary, Devon.
- Dennis Hughes Roberts, lately Deputy Chair, Local Government Boundary Commission for Wales. For services to Local Government and to the community in Gwynedd.
- Lorraine Robertson, Grade E1, Ministry of Defence. For public and voluntary service.
- Maureen Leonard Robertson, Chair, Glasgow Children's Panel Advisory Committee. For voluntary service to the Children's Hearings System.
- Eileen Mary Robinson. For voluntary service to the Caterpillar Club.
- Gillian Ann Robinson, Founder, Milton Keynes Community Cardiac Group. For services to Healthcare and to the community in Buckinghamshire.
- June Robinson. For public service.
- Desiree Leila Margaret Roderick. For voluntary services to the Commandos Benevolent Fund.
- Shirley Julianne Rodwell. For voluntary services in the field of Appeals and Public Relations, for People with Learning Disabilities in Westminster, London.
- David Barter Rogers, lately Sergeant, Ministry of Defence Police. For services to the Police.
- Brian Anthony Roper. For charitable services in Bath.
- Andrew Dixon Rose, lately President, Irish Hockey Association. For voluntary service to Sport in Northern Ireland.
- Jacqueline Mary Ross, Head, Population Management Unit, National Offender Management Service, Ministry of Justice.
- Professor Margaret Ross, Professor of Software Quality, Southampton Solent University. For services to Higher Education.
- Roger Hannant Rowe. For voluntary service to Music in Norfolk.
- Iris Roy, Non-Teaching Assistant and lately School Crossing Warden, St. James Church of England Primary School, Haslingden, Lancashire. For services to Education.
- Ann Margaret Ruddick, Chair, Tynedale Talking Newspaper Association. For voluntary service to Visually Impaired People in the North East.
- Lesley Rushton. For services to the Engineering and Physical Sciences Research Council.
- Ian James Russell, Curriculum and Quality Leader, Forth Valley College. For services to Further Education in Central Scotland.
- Farouk Saeed, Deputy Director, Export Control Compliance and Regulations, Thales. For services to the Defence Industry.
- Paul Salveson, Head of Government and Community Strategies, Northern Rail. For services to the Rail Industry.
- Brian Samuel Samuels, Regional Field Officer, East Midlands Region, National Association of Head Teachers. For services to Education and to the Voluntary Sector.
- Henry Sandon. For services to Broadcasting, the Ceramics Industry and to Charity.
- Dudley Alexander Temple Savill. For charitable services in London.
- Matthew Thomas Savill, Grade C1, Ministry of Defence.
- Diane Scott. For voluntary service to North London Hospice.
- Phyllis Mary Self, Director, Whitehall Garden Centre. For services to the community in Lacock, Wiltshire.
- Uanu Seshmi, Co-Founder, From Boyhood to Manhood Foundation. For services to Black and Minority Ethnic People.
- Peter Sharott, Director, East and South East England Specialist Pharmacy Services. For services to Pharmacy.
- Vanessa Shaw, Head of Dietetics, Great Ormond Street Hospital. For services to Children's Healthcare.
- Harry Lawton Sherratt. For voluntary service to the British Limbless Ex-Servicemen's Association.
- Ronald Simison. For services to Archaeology and to the Tourist Industry in Orkney.
- James White Simpson, Chair, Scottish Coastal Forum. For services to the Environment and to the Voluntary Sector.
- Anne Sinclair, Higher Executive Officer, The Pension Service. For public and voluntary service.
- Bernard Gerald Sinclair. For voluntary service to Redbridge Jewish Youth and Community Centre, London.
- Sheila Slingsby, Chief Emergency Planning Officer, Sheffield City Council. For services to Local Government and to the community in Sheffield, South Yorkshire.
- Andrew Smith, Purchasing Director, BSW Timber plc. For services to the Scottish Forestry Industry.
- Brian John Robert Smith, Administrative Officer, HM Prison Stocken, Rutland.
- Douglas Young Smith, QVRM. For services to the Water Industry, particularly Overseas.
- Ian Trevor Gordon Smith, lately Conductor, Southampton Youth Brass Band and Senior Music Teacher, Southampton Music Service. For services to Young People.
- Jennifer Mary Smith. For voluntary service to Hearing Dogs for Deaf People.
- John Wilson Smith. For voluntary service to the community in Newchurch, Isle of Wight.
- Dr. John Richard Harper-Smith. For voluntary service to the community in Horncastle, Lincolnshire.
- Kelly Smith, Striker, Arsenal Ladies and England. For services to Football.
- Pauline Smith, Deputy Head of Communications, Staffordshire Police. For services to the Police.
- Dr. Philip Harold Smith, Co-ordinator, Teacher Scientist Network. For services to Science Education.
- Raymond John Smith, Sailing Instructor, Mersea Island. For voluntary service to Young People and to Sport in Essex.
- Roger William Smith. For services to Young People in the London Boroughs of Barnet and Brent.
- Steve Smith. For services to the NHS and to the community in Hampshire.
- Linda Diane Soderberg, Manager, Radiological Sciences Directorate, Oxford Radcliffe Hospitals NHS Trust. For services to Healthcare in Oxfordshire.
- Joanna Christonie Annie Spiers, Founder and Trustee, Big Buzz, Everton, Liverpool. For voluntary service to Children.
- The Reverend Robert Percival Spratt, lately Prison Chaplain, HM Prison Preston, Lancashire. For public and voluntary service.
- John Stafford. For services to Rural Crafts, particularly Hedge Laying.
- Giles Justin Maxwell Stimson. For services to the Financial Services Industry.
- John Francis Stocker. For charitable services to the Hospice Movement and to the community in St. Albans, Hertfordshire.
- Diana Miranda Stratton. For charitable services in Norfolk.
- Louise Stuart, Consultant Podiatrist, Manchester Primary Care Trust and Senior Lecturer in Podiatry, University of Salford. For services to the Allied Health Professions.
- Giles Patrick Sturdy, DL. For services to the community in Dorset.
- Brian Summers, Chair, Tourism West Midlands. For services to the Tourist Industry and to the Voluntary Sector.
- Veronica Summers. For voluntary service to Older People in Cranbrook, Kent.
- Peter Berkeley Douglas Sutherland, Founder and President, Upper Thames Rowing Club. For voluntary service to Sport.
- Raymond Albert Sykes. For services to Brass Band Music and to the community in South Elmsall, West Yorkshire.
- Shahien Taj, Founder and Executive Director, Henna Foundation. For services to Diverse Community Engagement.
- Gerald Tasker. For voluntary service to the community in Royton, Lancashire.
- Anthony Peter Taylor, Chair of Governing Body, Walsall College. For voluntary service to Further Education.
- Paul Duncan Taylor. For charitable services in West Yorkshire.
- Susan Terry. For voluntary service to the community in Shellingford, Oxfordshire.
- Mahesh Paul Thapar, Special Constable, Hertfordshire Constabulary. For services to the Police.
- Tyndale Thomas. For services to African Caribbean Gospel Music and to the community in the North.
- John Andrew Kershaw Thompson, lately Deputy Headteacher, Derby Moor Community Sports College, Derby. For services to Education.
- Colin Thomson. For services to the NHS and to Charity in Wales.
- The Reverend Professor June Barbara Boyce-Tillman, Professor of Applied Music, University of Winchester. For services to Music and Education.
- Beryl Julia, Lady Tindle. For voluntary service to the community in Farnham, Surrey.
- Margaret Elizabeth Tobin. For voluntary service to Children and Families in Leicestershire.
- Anne Rosemary Tootle. For voluntary service to the Leprosy Mission, West Bengal, India.
- George Torrance, lately Facilities Management Team Leader, Linlithgow Academy, West Lothian. For services to Education.
- Louis Andreas Ttofa. For voluntary service to the community in Ormskirk, Lancashire.
- The Reverend Canon William Reginald Twaddell, Chair of the Board of Governors, Clounagh Junior High School Portadown. For voluntary service to Education in Northern Ireland.
- Anne Elizabeth Tyrrell, Founder and Managing Director, Anne Tyrrell Design Consultancy. For services to the Fashion Industry.
- Honor Ussher. For voluntary service to the community in Gloucester.
- Morgan Lewis Vaughan, former Councillor, Gwynedd County Council. For services to Local Government and to the community in Tywyn.
- Amanda Elizabeth Wadsworth, Senior Executive Officer, Jobcentre Plus. For public and voluntary service.
- John Wainwright, Regional Winter Service Officer, Highways Agency.
- Janet Wales, Study Support Manager, Runshaw College. For services to Special Needs Further Education and to the community in Preston, Lancashire.
- Eric Walker. For voluntary service to the Wey and Arun Canal.
- Richard Edward Walker, Acting Sergeant, Police Service of Northern Ireland. For services to the Police.
- Jennifer Wallace, Co-ordinator, Central England, Women's Royal Voluntary Service. For services to the community in the West Midlands.
- Edwin John Walsh. For services to the community in Blackburn, Lancashire.
- Marian Walters, lately School Secretary, Kempsey Primary School, Worcester and Clerk to the Governors, Kingfisher School, Redditch. For services to Education and to the Arts.
- Dr. Anthony Edward Warn. For services to the Water Industry.
- Don Warrington, Actor. For services to Drama.
- The Reverend Hilary Odette Watkins. For voluntary service to the Citizen's Advice Bureau and to the community in the South West.
- Roy Victor Watkinson, lately Hazardous Waste Policy Manager, Environment Agency. For public service.
- Rodney James Watson, Managing Director, Killyhevlin Hotel. For services to the Tourist Industry in Northern Ireland.
- Herbert Ronald Watts. For voluntary service to Horticulture.
- Frederick Richard Webb. For voluntary service to the Scouts in Middlesex.
- Kitty Elaine Joan Webber, Volunteer Ambulance Hospital Driver. For services to the community in Devon.
- Leslie Webber. For voluntary service to Angling and to Young People.
- Catherine Wegwermer, Principal, St. Joseph's Primary School, Crumlin. For services to Education in Northern Ireland.
- Elizabeth Isabella Weir, Field Officer, Rural Support. For services to Farmers and to the community in Northern Ireland.
- Wendy Wells. For services to the community in Sheffield, South Yorkshire.
- Paulette West. For services to Banking and to Business for Black and Minority Ethnic People.
- Judith Ann Westacott. For services to the community in Totnes, Devon.
- Alex Alphonso Wheatle, Writer. For services to Literature.
- William Charles Wheatley. For voluntary service to the community in Beeston, Nottinghamshire.
- Colin John Wheeler, Chief Executive, Licensed Trade Charity. For services to the Voluntary Sector.
- Derek Wheeler. For voluntary service to Heritage in Hitchin, Hertfordshire.
- Charles David White. For voluntary service to the Royal Naval Association.
- Patricia White, Member, Technical Support Team, Department of Oncology, Queen's University, Belfast. For services to Biomedical Research.
- Doris Irene Whiting. For voluntary service to the community in Trowbridge, Wiltshire.
- Jim Wiles. For voluntary service to the community in Newport Pagnell, Buckinghamshire.
- Sheila Wiles. For voluntary service to the community in Newport Pagnell, Buckinghamshire.
- Margaret Ann Wilkinson, Head of Projects, Neighbourhood Initiatives Foundation. For services to Town and Country Planning.
- Susan Mary Wilkinson, Librarian, HM Prison Birmingham. For services to Reading and Literacy.
- Barbara Williams. For services to the communities in Deal and Walmer, Kent.
- The Reverend Diane Patricia Williams, Chaplain, University of Edinburgh. For services to Higher Education.
- Dr. John Hugh Williams, lately Head of Heritage Conservation, Kent County Council. For services to Local Government.
- Alexander Maybin Wilson, Chairman, Broughshane and District Community Association. For services to the community in Northern Ireland.
- April Geraldine Wilson. For charitable services to the community in Sheringham, Norfolk.
- Colin Gordon John Wilson, Chair, Portishead and Bristol Lifeboat Trust. For voluntary service to Maritime Safety.
- Gillian Mary Wilson. For charitable services to the community in Sheringham, Norfolk.
- Robert Henry Wilson, Conductor and Musical Director, Donaghadee Male Voice Choir. For voluntary service to Music in Northern Ireland.
- Sheila Scott Anderson-Witty, lately Head of Communications, Natural Environment Research Council. For services to Science.
- Patrick Hugh Mackenzie Smyth Wood, Chair, Harpenden Branch, Royal National Lifeboat Institution. For voluntary service to Maritime Safety.
- Ronald James Woollacott. For services to the community in the London Borough of Southwark.
- Jane Woolley. For voluntary service to the community in Hambledon, Surrey.
- Commander Michael William Worrall, Royal Navy (Retd), Grade C2, Ministry of Defence.
- Neil Francis Wragg, Chief Executive, Youth at Risk UK. For services to Young People.
- Robert John Wright, Coxswain, Royal National Lifeboat Institution, Pwllheli. For voluntary service to Maritime Safety.
- Alice Elizabeth Primrose Wyborn. For services to People with Eczema.
- Hai Shuet Yeung, Artist. For services to Chinese Art and to the community in North East Lincolnshire.
- Ian Macrae Young, lately Director of International Development, NHS Scotland. For services to Healthcare.
- Morris Young, Senior Officer, Audit Service, E-Commerce and International Team Leader, HM Revenue and Customs.

Diplomatic Service and Overseas List

- Carlton Llewelyn Allen. For philanthropic activities in Montserrat.
- Claire Elizabeth Borrell. For services to victims of domestic violence in Gibraltar.
- Thomas John Burke, lately Second Secretary, British Consulate-General Istanbul.
- Alison Clare Cattanach, First Secretary, Foreign and Commonwealth Office.
- Peter Lloyd Chandler, First Secretary, Foreign and Commonwealth Office.
- Betty Jean Christian, lately Island Secretary and Communications Officer, Pitcairn Island. For public service.
- Adrian James Clarke, First Secretary, Foreign and Commonwealth Office.
- Sarah Jane Dean. For services to the education of deprived children in Zambia.
- Peter Dobson. For services to the British community in Tunisia.
- Jonathan Charles Douglas. For services to the British arts in Hong Kong.
- Kim Gould, lately Deputy Head of Mission, British Embassy Asmara.
- Stephen David Graham, First Secretary, Foreign and Commonwealth Office.
- Leslie Greaves. For services to ex-service men and women in Germany.
- James Harkins. For services to humanitarian aid overseas, especially Bosnia.
- Professor Iraj Hashi. For services to education and economic reconstruction in Kosovo.
- William Robert Henderson, LVO, lately Consul, British Consulate Portimão.
- Stefan Alexander Howells. For services to sport and human and social development in southern Africa.
- Stephen Howland. For services to British education in the Middle East.
- Helen Lam Yim Kit Ling, Professional Assistant to the Director, British Council, Hong Kong.
- Shalini Mahtani. For services to corporate social responsibility in Hong Kong.
- Norma Martindale. For services to British nationals in Tenerife.
- James McDonald Checa. For services to British-Peruvian relations, the British community and the arts in Peru.
- Clive John Mendez, Deputy Registrar, Supreme Court, Gibraltar. For services to the judiciary.
- Kalid Muhmood. For services to education in Vietnam.
- Harry Edward Maughn Murphy. For services to sport in Gibraltar.
- Goona Naidu. For services to British ex-service men and women in France.
- Diane Cheryl Perry. For services to education in Brussels.
- Elizabeth Ramsay, Client Relations Manager, British Council, Sydney.
- William Robinson, lately Chief Security Officer, British High Commission New Delhi.
- Pastor Winston Audley Rose. For services to the community in the Cayman Islands.
- Patrick George Martin Sherwood. For services to the British Hospital in Montevideo.
- Anita Jane Smith. For charitable services to the Bansang Hospital in Gambia.
- Paul Henry Richard Smith, Director General of Civil Aviation, Cayman Islands. For services to the aviation industry.
- Dr. Christopher Malcolm Stubbs. For services to mentally handicapped children and families in Sri Lanka.
- David Leckie Thomas. For services to the construction of village schools in Nepal.
- Jane Walker. For services to disadvantaged children in the Philippines.
- David George Wells, Overseas Security Manager, British High Commission Karachi.
- Brian Gordon James Wilkie. For services to British commercial interests and charitable activities in the United Arab Emirates.
- Robin Wilfrid Woods. For services to the conservation of wildlife in the Falkland Islands.
- Joan Elizabeth Dillas-Wright. For services to healthcare in Bermuda.

=== Royal Red Cross (RRC) ===
- Major Carol Ann Chambers (542919), Queen Alexandra's Royal Army Nursing Corps.
- Group Captain Jacqueline Lesley Gross (409260U), Princess Mary's Royal Air Force Nursing Service.

==== Associate of the Royal Red Cross (ARRC) ====
- Major Julie Lingard, TD, (538247), Queen Alexandra's Royal Army Nursing Corps, Territorial Army.
- Major Karen Jennifer Stockbridge (548372), Queen Alexandra's Royal Army Nursing Corps.
- Squadron Leader Sarah Elizabeth Charters (2640499R), Royal Auxiliary Air Force.
- Squadron Leader Teresa Anne Griffiths (409501S), Princess Mary's Royal Air Force Nursing Service.

=== Queen's Police Medal (QPM) ===
England and Wales

- Roger Baker, Chief Constable, Essex Police.
- Andrew Belcher, Constable, West Midlands Police.
- Keith Bristow, Chief Constable, Warwickshire Police.
- Brian Fenlon, Constable, Greater Manchester Police Treasurer, Police Federation of England and Wales.
- John Edward Francis, Inspector, Metropolitan Police Service.
- Roger Gomm, Superintendent, Metropolitan Police Service.
- Christopher Adam Gregg, Chief Superintendent, West Yorkshire Police.
- David Johnston, lately Commander, Metropolitan Police Service.
- Brian David Langston, Chief Superintendent, Thames Valley Police.
- Grahame Ronald Maxwell, Chief Constable, North Yorkshire Police.
- David Richard Morgan, Constable, Dyfed–Powys Police.
- Stephen John Morgan, Chief Superintendent, British Transport Police.
- Martin Barnabas Richards, Chief Constable, Sussex Police.
- David Charles Nelson Warcup, Deputy Chief Constable, Northumbria Police.
- Russell John Wate, Detective Chief Superintendent, Cambridgeshire Constabulary.
- David Anthony White, Chief Inspector, Metropolitan Police Service.
- Janet Elizabeth Williams, Deputy Assistant Commissioner, Metropolitan Police Service.

Scotland

- Robert Ballantyne, Special Constable, Grampian Police.
- Thomas Halpin, Deputy Chief Constable, Lothian and Borders Police.

Northern Ireland

- Derek David Harvey Douglas, Detective Superintendent, Police Service of Northern Ireland.
- Andrew Galbraith, Inspector, Police Service of Northern Ireland.
- Noel Charles Rogan, Inspector, Police Service of Northern Ireland.

=== Queen's Fire Services Medal (QFSM) ===
England and Wales

- Paul Maurice Fuller, Chief Fire Officer, Bedfordshire and Luton Fire and Rescue Service.
- Brian Hesler, Chief Fire Officer, Northumberland Fire and Rescue Service.
- Maxwell Hood, Assistant Commissioner, London Fire Brigade.
- Terence Standing, Chief Fire Officer, Gloucestershire Fire and Rescue Service.
- Geoffrey Alan Taylor, Chief Fire Officer, Shropshire Fire and Rescue Service.

Scotland

- Paul Austin, lately Group Manager, Strathclyde Fire and Rescue Service.
- James Campbell, Chief Officer, Fife Fire and Rescue Service.
- (William) John Strachan, Retained Officer-in-Charge Stonehaven, Grampian Fire and Rescue Service.

=== Queen's Volunteer Reserves Medal (QVRM) ===
Royal Navy

- Lieutenant Commander Christopher Montford Kenyon, Royal Naval Reserve.

Army

- Captain Keith Joseph Jarrett, TD, (521126), The Royal Logistic Corps, Territorial Army.
- Captain Graham Jennings (543129), Royal Corps of Signals, Territorial Army.
- Major William George Lee, TD, (532419), The Royal Regiment of Scotland, Territorial Army.
- Lieutenant Colonel Jennifer Rachel Stocks (522317), The Royal Logistic Corps, Territorial Army.

== Australia ==
The Queen's Birthday Honours 2008 for Australia were announced on 9 June 2008.

== New Zealand ==
The Queen's Birthday Honours 2008 for New Zealand were announced on 2 June 2008.

== Barbados ==
=== Order of the British Empire ===
==== Commander of the Order of the British Empire (CBE) ====
Civil Division

- Dr. Atley Hollis Brathwaite. For services to agriculture.
- John Randall St Clair Gill. For services to medicine in the area of neurosurgery.
- Gordon Heathcot Walters. For services to the community.

==== Officer of the Order of the British Empire (OBE) ====
Civil Division

- Avaril Vashti Inniss. For services to the Health Sector and HIV and AIDS.
- Canon Ivor McKinley Jones. For services to the Church, education and the community.
- Creighton Keith Laurie. For services to agriculture.

==== Member of the Order of the British Empire (MBE) ====
Civil Division

- Anthony Anderson Lovell, JP. For services to sport.
- Eric McDeighton Sealy. For services to boxing.

== The Bahamas ==
=== Order of the British Empire ===
==== Commander of the Order of the British Empire (CBE) ====
Civil Division

- Wendy M. Craigg. For services to the finance industry.
- David Albert Kelly. For services to business and sport.
- Vincent Vanderpool-Wallace. For services to tourism.

==== Officer of the Order of the British Empire (OBE) ====
Civil Division

- Dr. Davidson Hepburn. For public and foreign service.
- McGregor Norton Robertson. For services to the financial industry.
- Sylvia E. Scriven. For services to politics and development.
- Dr. George H. Sherman. For services to the medical profession.

==== Member of the Order of the British Empire (MBE) ====
Civil Division

- John Campbell (Jack) Albury. For services to business and the community.
- Rodney Wilbert Braynen. For services to architecture and education.
- Edwin (Vikie) Brown. For services to politics.
- Marina Glinton. For services to the public and private sector and the Bahamas Red Cross.
- Yvonne Isaacs. For services to politics and the community.
- Oswald Marshall. For services as a Trade Unionist, hotelier and businessman.
- Frank Russell. For services to business and the community.

=== British Empire Medal (BEM) ===
Civil Division

- Beryl Adams. For services to banking.
- Melvern Cornish. For services to business and the community.
- Barbara Darville. For services to business and the community.
- Laurin Knowles. For services to the community.
- Dolly Mills. For services to the community and business.
- Joanna Newton. For services to business and the community.
- George Russell. For services to the fishing industry and the community.
- Felamease Sawyer. For services to education and the community, and as a social activist.
- The Reverend Newton Williamson. For services to the community.

=== Queen's Police Medal (QPM) ===
- Willard Mingo Cunningham. For services to law enforcement.
- Christopher Noel McCoy. For services to law enforcement.

== Grenada ==
=== Order of the British Empire ===
==== Officer of the Order of the British Empire (OBE) ====
Civil Division

- Winston Joseph James. For services to the Police.
- Dr. Carol M. McIntosh. For services to medicine.

== Papua New Guinea ==
=== Knight Bachelor ===
- Koitaga Mano, MBE. For services to Western Highlands, particularly the Mount Giluwe community.

=== Order of Saint Michael and Saint George ===
==== Knight Commander of the Order of St Michael and St George (KCMG) ====
- Chief Sir Mari Kapi, GCL, CBE. For services to the law and the judiciary as a Judge of the National Court and Chief Justice.

==== Companion of the Order of St Michael and St George (CMG) ====
- Pastor Thomas Davai. For services to the community and the Seventh Day Adventist Church.
- Andrew Sean Trawen, MBE. For services to the Electoral Commission and the implementation of the Limited Preferential Voting System.

=== Order of the British Empire ===
==== Knight Commander of the Order of the British Empire (KBE) ====
Civil Division

- Jerry Kasip Nalau. For services to public administration, politics and the community.

==== Commander of the Order of the British Empire (CBE) ====
Civil Division

- Peter Robert Botten. For services to commerce and the mining and petroleum industry.
- Simon Mow Kueng Foo, MBE. For services to tourism, hospitality and the community.
- Michael Nali. For services to politics and the Southern Highlands Province.

==== Officer of the Order of the British Empire (OBE) ====
Military Division

- Captain Max Aleale, Papua New Guinea Defence Force.

Civil Division

- Robert Bates. For services to the community, aviation and the tourism industry.
- Gavin Ernest Crosbie. For services to business and the community.
- Aua Roy Evara. For services to education and politics.
- Sister Marietta Garnier. For services to the Catholic Church and education.
- Loani Ravu Henao. For services to law, the United Church and the Bible Society.
- John Ma'o Kali. For public service.
- Kila Ara Karo, MBE. For diplomatic service and public administration.
- Sister Maria Koae. For services to education and religious formation.
- The Reverend Charles Nombo Lapa, MBE. For services to the community and the Christian Life Centre.
- Kenneth George Lifu. For services to public administration and commerce.
- Michael Malabag. For services to the Electoral Commission and the Public Employees Association.
- Dr. Bernard Stephen Minol. For services to education and the University of Papua New Guinea.
- Manasupe Zure Zurenuoc. For public service in the Morobe Province.

==== Member of the Order of the British Empire (MBE) ====
Military Division

- Commander Tau Charlie Ila, Papua New Guinea Defence Force.
- Lieutenant Colonel Dominic Bulungol, Papua New Guinea Defence Force.
- Lieutenant Colonel Mark Goina, Papua New Guinea Defence Force.

Civil Division

- Peter John Aitsi. For services to broadcasting and the Media Council.
- Alois Yolape Alapala. For services to the community.
- Jim Andrews. For services to the Royal Papua New Guinea Constabulary.
- Marus Bai. For services to sport and Rugby League.
- Samson Waka Chicki. For public service.
- The Reverend Boyd Daryl. For services to the community and the Evangelical Lutheran Church.
- Neil Barton Feakes. For services to business and the community.
- Colin Lindsay Gould. For services to the community and the Papua New Guinea Volunteer Rifle Association.
- Kenneth Harvey. For services to commerce and sport.
- Rodney Hoffmann. For services to banking and rural development.
- Richard G. Knight. For services to tourism and the diving industry.
- Victor Agilo Kunini. For services to education and the Hela community.
- Sivore Lakou. For services to the community and the United Church.
- Dr. Misimoa Lam. For services to medicine and healthcare.
- Bernard Limoto. For services to education.
- Brother Bede Mackrell. For services to education.
- Robert Mellor. For services to public administration and the Papua New Guinea Law Society.
- Mary Mennis. For services to the Bel community of Madang through the recording of their traditional history.
- Nanai Momo. For public service.
- Dr. Adolf Saweri. For services to health and medical education.
- Derek Edward Smith. For services to architecture and the building industry.
- Hakiso So-Omba. For services to forestry.
- Anna Bernadette Solomon. For services to the print media industry.
- Luke Vava. For services to the Magisterial Service.
- John Oldham Waingut. For services to the community and to the National Broadcasting Corporation. (To be dated 16 June 2007.)
- Jim Wan. For services to the Royal Papua New Guinea Constabulary.
- Daniel Wanma. For services to aviation and to Air Niugini.

=== Companion of the Imperial Service Order (ISO) ===
- Karl Mondo. For public service.
- Gerald Keimbu Poivi. For public service.

=== British Empire Medal (BEM) ===
Military Division

- Petty Officer Lawrence Pano, Papua New Guinea Defence Force.
- Sergeant David Barnabas, Papua New Guinea Defence Force.
- Sergeant Siaoa Harold, Papua New Guinea Defence Force.
- Sergeant Keana Keana, Papua New Guinea Defence Force.
- Sergeant Gimona Kuriki, Papua New Guinea Defence Force.

Civil Division

- Rose Bia. For services to the community.
- Martin Brash. For services to project management.
- Jack Bungtabu. For services to the Royal Papua New Guinea Constabulary.
- Darius Gilime. For services to radio broadcasting and the United Church.
- Alexius Kavea Iva. For public service.
- Benjamin Jaing. For services to the community and the Lutheran Church.
- Vincent Kaiggu. For services to the community.
- John W. Kalaut. For services to law and the community.
- Jeffrey Kera. For services to the Royal Papua New Guinea Constabulary.
- Josephine Kiak. For services to education.
- Roroi Levao. For services to the community.
- Teine Stanley Malai. For services to agricultural extension.
- Benjamin Mangobe. For services to the community.
- Elizabeth Mission. For services to education.
- Thomas Kulie Mond. For services to education and religion.
- Agnes Mondia. For services to the community and to sport.
- John Levo Morola. For services to education and to the community.
- Theodore Muriki. For services to the community.
- Konduna Nare. For services to the community.
- Naiyo Niniko. For services to the Lutheran Church.
- Elsie Paisawa. For services to Air Niugini.
- Yalura Pakopi. For services to the community.
- Michael Singol. For services to the community.
- Miliana Sitapak. For services to healthcare.
- Nigel Sonadi. For services to the community and to the Anglican Church.
- Cecilia Teliwa. For services to the Church and to youth work.
- Pouro Keto Tepuri. For services to the Lutheran Church.
- Philip Tere. For services to education.
- John Karisora Thomas. For services to the community.
- Christina Tokmun. For services to the community.
- Ua Vagi. For services to the community.
- Clement K. Wariame. For services to the community.
- Pulupe Wauwe. For services to rural agriculture.
- Marcus Yacob. For services to healthcare, and to the Goroka General Hospital.
- Alpias Yanikawo. For services to the community.
- Amy Yowano. For advancement of women in agriculture.

=== Queen's Police Medal (QPM) ===
- Allan Kundi. For services to the Royal Papua New Guinea Constabulary.
- Gorobun Mondiai. For services to the Royal Papua New Guinea Constabulary.
- Ephraim Tomonmon. For services to the Royal Papua New Guinea Constabulary.

== Solomon Islands ==
=== Order of the British Empire ===
==== Officer of the Order of the British Empire (OBE) ====
Civil Division

- John Ratu Adifaka. For public service, commerce and community development.
- Martin Alufurai. For services to sport and youth development.

==== Member of the Order of the British Empire (MBE) ====
Civil Division

- Eliel Ahikau. For services to education.
- Kenneth Hall Averre. For public service and community development.
- Ken Boon Kin Chan. For services to commerce and community development.
- Walter Kola. For services to the Solomon Island Police Force and the community.
- The Honourable Augustine Taneko. For public service and community development.

=== British Empire Medal (BEM) ===
Civil Division

- Jack Balaga. For services to the Solomon Island Police Force.
- Cecil Rhodes Kusapa. For services to the Solomon Island Police Force.
- Joseph Manelugu. For services to the Solomon Island Police Force.
- Gabriel Manelusi. For services to the Solomon Island Police Force and the community.
- Jackson Ofu. For services to the Solomon Island Police Force.
- Robert Piringisau. For services to the Solomon Island Police Force.
- Johnson Siapu. For services to the Solomon Island Police Force.
- Edmond Sikua. For services to the Solomon Island Police Force.

=== Queen's Police Medal (QPM) ===
- Veronica Aoraunisaka. For services to the Solomon Island Police Force.
- Captain Moala Pada. For service to the Solomon Island Police Force.

== Saint Lucia ==
=== Order of Saint Michael and Saint George ===
==== Knight Commander of the Order of St Michael and St George (KCMG) ====
- Dr. Leton Felix Thomas, CBE. For services to education and public administration.

=== Order of the British Empire ===
==== Officer of the Order of the British Empire (OBE) ====
Civil Division

- Dr. Stephen James King. For services to medicine.
- Christopher Renwick. For services to business.

==== Member of the Order of the British Empire (MBE) ====
Civil Division

- Marie Petronilla Deterville. For services to music education.
- Jeremy Clifton Joseph. For services to education and public administration.
- Winifred Dora Servé. For services to early childhood education.

=== British Empire Medal (BEM) ===
Civil Division

- Gregor Biscette. For services to education and the community.
- Lydia Charlemagne. For services to environmental conservation.
- Raphael Eleuthere For services to agriculture.
- Marylene Gaston For services to folk culture.
- Lancia Mary Isidore. For services to the National Council and persons with disabilities.

== Belize ==
=== Order of the British Empire ===
==== Member of the Order of the British Empire (MBE) ====
Civil Division

- Philippa Audrey Griffith-Bailey, JP. For services to sport, the community and the environment.
- Diego Santiago Bol, JP. For services to education and to the preservation of indigenous cultures.
- Ruben Ricardo Campos Sr., JP. For services to health and to public life.
- Addy Castillo. For services to business and to the community.
- Myrna Manzanares. For services to education, culture and social development.
