= FRSA (disambiguation) =

FRSA most often refers to Fellow of the Royal Society of Arts, an honorary membership in a British society.

FRSA may also refer to:

- Fire and Rescue Services Act 2004, an act of parliament of the United Kingdom
- Fire and Rescue Services Association, a British trade union
- Fire Research and Safety Act of 1968, an act of the United States Congress
- Frankenia salina, a plant with Natural Resources Conservation Service identifier FRSA
- FARSA (gene), the gene for a human RNA synthetase enzyme also abbreviated as FRSA
