= Dave Johnston (police officer) =

British police chief

David Johnston is a former senior officer of the Metropolitan Police Service he served between 2004 -2008 as Commander of the Homicide and Serious Crime Command and as a hostage negotiator.

He was awarded the Queen's Police Medal in the 2008 Birthday Honours list.

Johnston previously served in Avon and Somerset Constabulary between 1979 and 2004 as Detective Chief Superintendent head of Crime and counter terrorism.

Prior to joining the police, Johnston served in the British Army with 59 Independent Commando Squadron Royal Engineers.

After leaving the police service in 2008 Johnston went on to work for the Foreign and Commonwealth Office on matters of national security. He was the Head of The National Technical Assistance Centre between 2008 and 2016.

Since 2016 Johnston has worked as a private consultant on security matters.

== Career ==
Johnston served in the British Army from 1974 to 1979, having joined the army as a boy soldier in 1972 and trained at the Army Apprentices College in Chepstow. After basic training Johnston volunteered for specialist training and joined the Royal Engineers 59 Commando squadron where he served until leaving the army in 1979.

From 1979 to 2004 Johnston served in Avon and Somerset Constabulary as a detective, hostage negotiator and senior investigating officer. He also served as the head of CID before moving to Scotland Yard.

Between 2004 and 2008 Johnston was the Metropolitan Police's head of homicide and serious crime, in which capacity he led the Damilola Taylor and the Torso in the Thames investigations. He also advised the Suffolk police on the serial killings of five women by Stephen Wright. In 2008 Johnston was awarded the Queen's Police Medal for outstanding police service.

From 2008 to 2016 Johnston was the head of the National Technical Assistance Centre, a business unit of GCHQ with responsibility for maintaining interception of communications capability for all UK agencies. He also served as an advisor to government on policy and legislation for this area of work. Johnston also held office as the strategic lead for economic crime investigation and policy at Scotland Yard, working with government, industry and international regulatory bodies to help develop anti–money laundering regulation and compliance.

During his policing career Johnston attracted some controversy when he suggested that:

- DNA samples should be taken from babies and then stored as a future resource.
- The information could be used to both to solve and also to help prevent future crimes.
- Samples could be taken from people when they renewed their passports and also that they should be taken from migrants arriving in the UK.

Johnston holds an MSc in public management and a postgraduate qualification in criminology from Fitzwilliam College, Cambridge. He is a regular contributor to the Cambridge University Congress on Economic Crime, speaking on strategies to combat money laundering, cyber crime and insider threat.

He is currently the managing director of Yaana Ltd., a technology company based at The Shard, London.
