= Hilary King =

Welsh bowler (1931–2024)

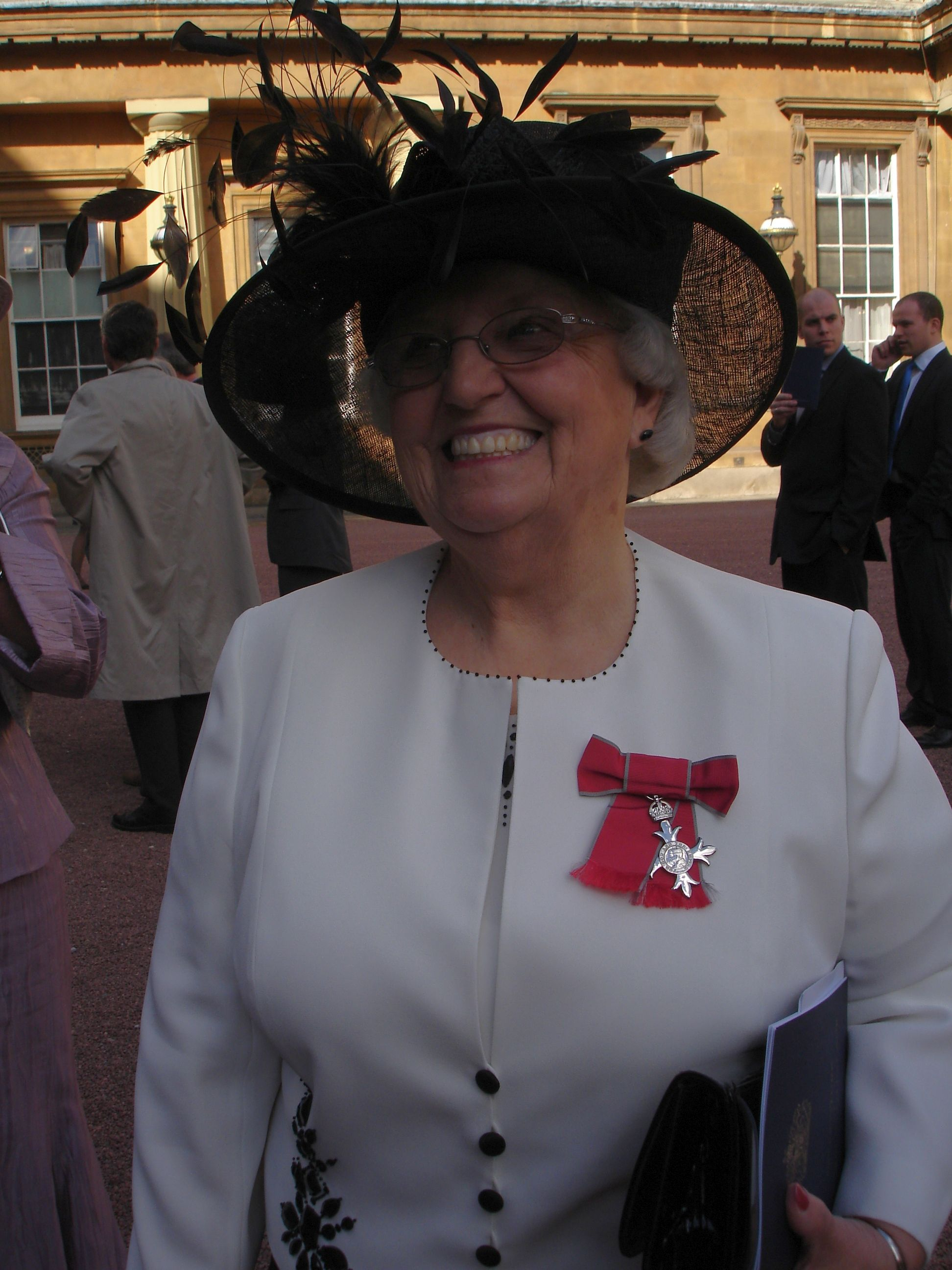
King in 2008

Hilary King, MBE (1931 – September 2024) was a Welsh bowler and, as first woman President of the World Indoor Bowls Council (2001) and the first woman to be given Honorary Life Membership of the World Indoor Bowls Council, a pioneer for women in the sport.

== Early life ==
Born Hilary Pomeroy and raised in Treherbert, the daughter of local shopkeepers, King took up outdoor bowls in the mid 1960s.

== Career ==
Although an accomplished bowler in her own right, King's main contribution to the sport has been as an administrator. Starting as Secretary of Treherbert Ladies Outdoor Club (1976–94), she became Secretary of Glamorgan County Bowls Association (1980–85) and soon became Secretary of Rhondda Indoor Bowls (1982–84) while simultaneously National Tournament Secretary (1982–85). In 1985 she became Secretary of the Welsh Ladies Indoor Bowling Association, a post she still held. She was in addition, the Secretary of British Isles Women’s Indoor Bowls Council (2000–03).

Keen to promote the sustainability of the sport, in the 2000s King set up and organised the annual Welsh Ladies Junior Singles and the World Junior Singles Tournament (named the Wilf Pomeroy Trophy after Hilary's father), the mixed Under 16 Club Leagues and, determined also to promote the benefits of sport for older people, she initiated the Welsh over 60s Mixed Pairs Tournament. Aware of the power of the media, due to her efforts the Ladies National Bowls Singles event has been televised since 2003, which means that the sport can reach a wider audience and its popularity has been increased even further.

In the 2008 Birthday Honours, King was awarded an MBE in recognition of her services to Bowls in Wales.

== Death ==
King died in September 2024.
