= Paul Leinster =

Academic and environmentalist

Paul Leinster CBE is Professor of Environmental Assessment in the Centre for Environment and Agricultural Informatics at Cranfield University. In 2008 he was awarded the CBE.

== Career ==
Leinster graduated from Imperial College London where he also was awarded a Ph.D. in 1977. He had a working career involving posts at BP and Smith Kline Beecham before joining the Environment Agency as director of operations in 1998, later becoming its chief executive in 2008.

He joined Cranfield University in 2015 and is also chair of bpha a housing association in Bedford covering the geographical area between Oxford and Cambridge.
