= Adrian Hobbs =

British safety expert (born 1946)

- Born: January 1946 (age 80)

Adrian Hobbs (born January 1946) is a British safety expert specializing in automobile crashworthiness. Hobbs has a background in accident and injury investigation/analysis.

As an engineer and later as Honorary Chief Research Scientist, Hobbs was involved in the UK Government's program of Crash Injury Research. He undertook research that helped lead to the mandatory wearing of seat belts in the UK, the development of the Offset Deformable Frontal Barrier Crash Test, and the establishment of the safety organization Euro NCAP. Hobbs was awarded a C.B.E. in 2008.

Hobbs has consulted on behalf of the World Bank, the World Health Organization, the European Commission, and Central European and North African countries on transport safety and the provision of emergency services.

== Safety career ==
Hobbs joined the Transport Research Laboratory (TRL) in 1972 as a Scientific Officer. For two years, he was involved in researching the causes of motor vehicle collisions, investigating contributing factors alongside the police. In 1976, he reported on his analysis of brake defects and their contribution to accidents.

In 1974, he redirected his attention to car occupant injuries. He examined and reported on the direct link between accidents, the resulting injuries, their causes, and the effectiveness of safety features using medical data, car inspections, and questionnaires. During this time, he determined that intrusion into the vehicle's passenger compartment during a frontal impact crash was a major factor in causing injuries.

In 1978, Hobbs published a comprehensive study of the life-saving potential of wearing a seat belt. This study helped lead to the passing of legislation in the UK mandating the use of seatbelts which took effect on 31 January 1983.

Turning the focus of his research to vehicle safety, Hobbs designed a demonstration Pedestrian Safety Car in 1985 (based on a Mini Metro), later modified to incorporate frontal and side impact protection. For side impact, conventional wisdom holds that protection comes from strengthening the side of the car and providing padding protection on the inside of the door. Hobbs expressed his concern that many manufacturers were locating door beams where they could increase the risk of injury. Hobbs's modifications indeed improved the Pedestrian Safety Car, but it still did not provide good protection or meet proposed side impact test requirements. Elsewhere in France, Germany, and the UK, another vehicle was tested. Hobbs researched this car, which, although weaker than the modified Metro, performed better. He discovered that a lighter door bounces off the impacting car and starts moving the occupant earlier, increasing the time the body has to absorb the impact and therefore reducing the severity of injuries. He also discovered that when the door is designed to move in vertically, it spreads the load over the chest, abdomen, and pelvis. Doing so consequently redirects its concentration away from the vulnerable chest area and reduces the possibility of a fatal injury. Any padding, Hobbs observed, had to be very soft to help spread the load and cushion the impact. These conclusions and research directly influenced the development of the European Side Impact Directive.

In the early 1990s, Hobbs identified inadequacies in the current frontal crash test procedure and his research led to the development of the Offset Deformable Barrier (ODB) Frontal Impact Crash Test. Hobbs's frontal ODB test was adopted, in Europe and elsewhere, for both legislation and consumer test programs.

Hobbs then took on the study of compatibility, the science of how cars can work together to minimize injuries to the occupants of both vehicles. Although his research identified necessary changes and produced an assessment procedure, Hobbs' research funding ran out and the government lost interest in further improving car crash safety.

== Europe ==
During the 1990s, Hobbs was a member of the European Experimental Vehicles Committee (EEVC), where he initiated the Frontal Impact and Compatibility Working Groups. He also collaborated with other working groups to develop test procedures for side impact and pedestrian protection.

Hobbs was asked by the European Transport Safety Council (ETSC) to present the case for the adoption of the EEVC Frontal and Side Impact test procedures for European Type Approval to the European Parliament in Strasbourg. The EEVC was proposing an initially crash test speed of 56 km/h (35 mph) rather than the 60 km/h (37 mph) then typically used in research crash tests.

== Consumer information ==
In the UK, Hobbs contributed to a proposal for an independent crash test programme called UK NCAP. His proposal, presented in 1994, outlined to the UK Department of Transport the concept of a consumer information programme based on the EEVC's proposed frontal impact, side impact, and pedestrian protection crash test procedures.

The Department of Transport agreed to go ahead with the proposal and initiated the first phase of tests and assessments. Following further discussions with the European Commission in Brussels, Hobbs mentioned the proposal to Max Mosley, then president of the Fédération Internationale de l'Automobile (FIA), the governing body for Formula One. With the support of the FIA and other European players, Hobbs' proposal, initially known as the UK NCAP programme, came to be branded as Euro NCAP.

Euro NCAP (the European New Car Assessment Programme) is an established consumer testing programme that assesses and publishes the safety of new cars and provides valuable safety information to consumers. The inaugural meeting of Euro NCAP was held in December 1996 with the UK Department of Transport, the FIA, the Swedish National Road Association (SNRA), and International Testing. The first results of 7 crash-tested super-minis were released publicly to the media in early 1997. Hobbs was the first Chairman of the Technical Working Group and he later became Secretary General until his retirement in 2007.

== Personal life ==
Hobbs continues to provide consultancy on road and vehicle safety issues, as well as continues to provide advice to the media. He is a motorsport enthusiast. Since 1974, he has been married to his wife Jacqueline, a retired teacher. Their adopted son died in 2002. Hobbs and his wife live together in Berkshire, England.

== Selected publications ==
- Hobbs, C A et al, “Classification of Injury Severity by Length of Stay in Hospital” (1979), TRRL Laboratory Report 871, Crowthorne.
- Lowne, R W et al. (1979), “The Need for a Force Measuring Dummy in Side Impact Testing,” Proceedings of the Society of Automotive Engineers Passenger Car Meeting, Dearborn.
- Hobbs, Adrian (2000), “Protecting People in Crashes: Making Cars Safer,” Best in Europe 2000 Road Safety Conference, European Transport Safety Council, Brussels.
- Hobbs, Adrian, et al, (2001), “Priorities for EU Motor Vehicle Safety Design,” European Transport Safety Council, Brussels.
- Hobbs, C A. (2005), “Creating A Market For Safety: 10 Years of Euro NCAP,” The European New Car Assessment Programme, Brussels.
