= Papua New Guinea Law Society =

The Papua New Guinea Law Society is a professional association representing the legal profession in Papua New Guinea. The society has a number of regulatory roles under the Lawyers Act 1986.
