= Immigration Law Practitioners Association =

Professional association in the United Kingdom

Immigration Law Practitioners Association (ILPA) is a United Kingdom professional association of lawyers and academics practising in or concerned about immigration, asylum and nationality law. The ILPA was founded in 1984 and aims "to promote and improve advice and representation in immigration, asylum and nationality law, through an extensive programme of training and disseminating information and by providing research and opinion that draw on the experiences of members."

The association has been actively involved in developing policy and providing legal aid to immigrants.
