= Nicolas Clark Adamson =

British officer

Nicolas Clark Adamson CVO OBE (born 5 September 1938) was Private Secretary to Prince Edward, Duke of Kent from 1993 to 2011.

== Career ==
Adamson joined the RAF in 1959 and served in various fighter squadrons based in the United Kingdom and the Middle East (1960–65). After becoming a flight lieutenant in 1962, he was later chosen as an aide-de-camp to the CDS (1967–69). In 1969, he was seconded to diplomatic service before moving to his recent role in the Royal Household. He is a Fellow of the Royal Aeronautical Society.
