= Irene Higginson =

Irene J. Higginson OBE is a British professor, head of department and the director of King's College London's Cicely Saunders Institute.

Higginson has a medical degree from the University of Nottingham.

Higginson is the director of the Cicely Saunders Institute, at King's College London, the world's first purpose-built institute of palliative care. She was appointed an OBE in 2008 for services to medicine and was elected a Fellow of the Academy of Medical Sciences in 2013.
