= Fire and Rescue Services Association =

FRSA
- Formation: 1978; 48 years ago
- Location: United Kingdom
- Members: ▼1,604 (2024)
- CEO: Tristan Ashby
- President: Mark Palmer
- Website: frsa.org.uk

The Fire and Rescue Services Association (FRSA) is a British trade union representing all fire service staff employed under grey or green book terms and conditions

The Association was founded in 1976, as the Retained Firefighters' Union (RFU) and changed its name to "The Fire and Rescue Services Association" (FRSA) in 2018.

The FRSA is a member led organisation committed to protecting and modernising the terms and conditions, health & well being support and working practices within the Fire and Rescue Service.

The FRSA has a no strike constitution, FRSA members will not put their communities at risk, and they prefer the power of argument rather than the argument of power.

== General Secretaries / Chief Executive Officer ==
1976: Don Bates General Secretary
1997: Derek Chadbon General Secretary
2007: John Barton General Secretary
2015: Tristan Ashby. Chief Executive Officer
