= Household of Elizabeth II =

Royal officials and supporting staff

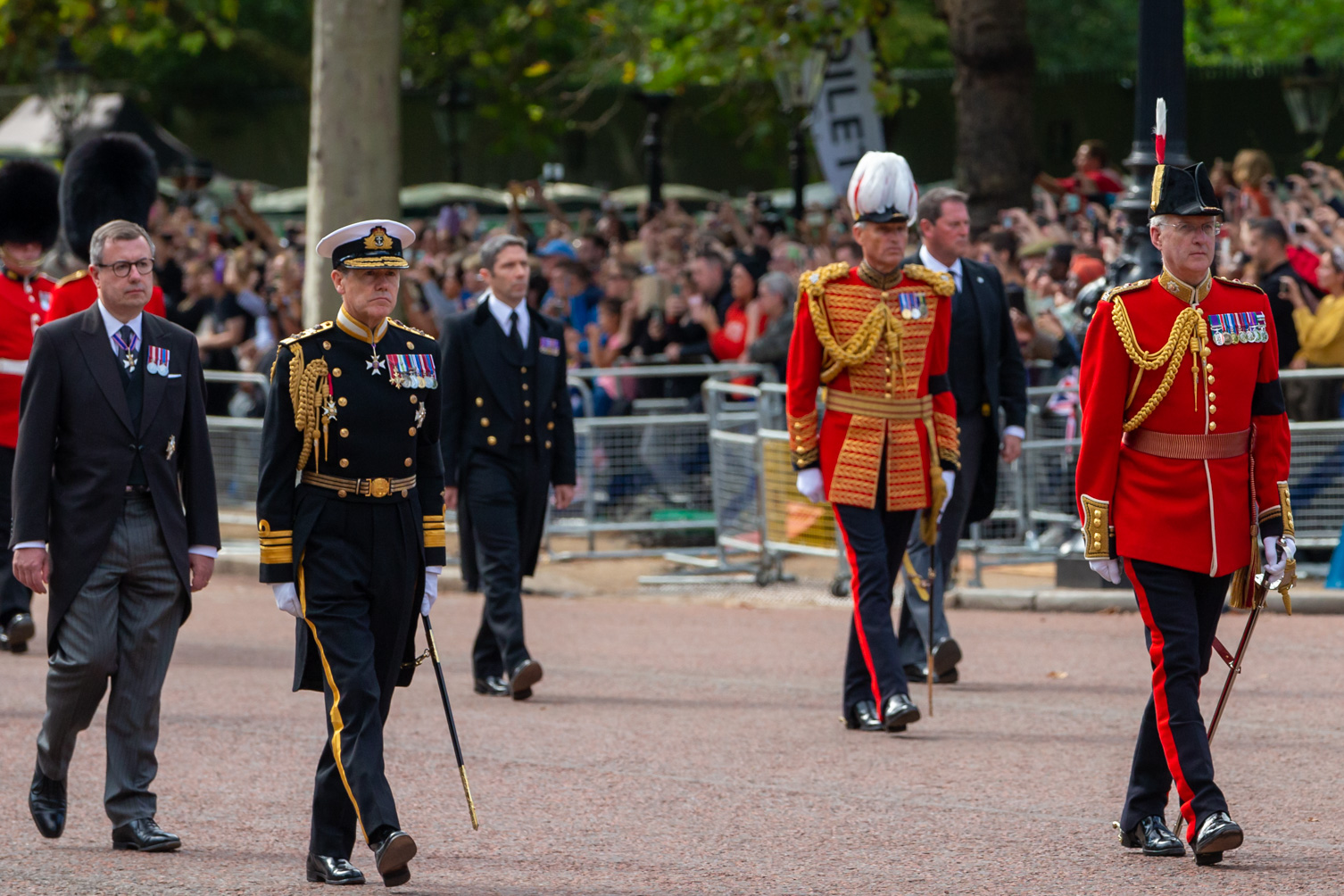
Members of the late Queen's Household walking before her coffin on 14 September 2022: (left to right) her Private Secretary, Master of the Household, Page, Master of the Horse and Comptroller of the Lord Chamberlain's Office.

The Household of Elizabeth II supported the work of the monarch in (and outside) the United Kingdom between February 1952 and September 2022; the Household of the Duke of Edinburgh supported the work of her consort from February 1952 up until his death in April 2021. (The Royal Households of the United Kingdom consist of royal officials and the supporting staff of the British royal family; in addition to the Royal Household which supports the Sovereign, each member of the Royal Family who undertakes public duties has their own separate household.)

When Elizabeth II was still a Princess she married Philip, Duke of Edinburgh, on 20 November 1947. After that marriage they shared the Household of the Duke and Duchess of Edinburgh.

When she succeeded her father George VI as sovereign of the United Kingdom, she appointed a new household, known as the Household of the Sovereign 1952–2022.

The Duke of Edinburgh then received a separate household upon his wife's accession, the Household of the Duke of Edinburgh until his death in 2021.

With the passing of the Queen on 8 September 2022 the Household of the Sovereign passed to her son, King Charles III.

== Great officers of the Household ==
=== Lord Chamberlain ===
The Lord Chamberlain is the highest-ranking official of the Royal Household of the United Kingdom, overseeing the departments that support and provide advice to the Sovereign of the United Kingdom, while also acting as the main channel of communication between the Sovereign and the House of Lords.

Name	Began	Ended	Notes	Ref.
George Villiers, 6th Earl of Clarendon	5 August 1952	1952	His tenure carried over from the reign of King George VI	
Roger Lumley, 11th Earl of Scarbrough	1952	1963		
Cameron Cobbold, 1st Baron Cobbold	29 January 1963	30 November 1971		
Charles Maclean, Baron Maclean	1 December 1971	30 November 1984		
David Ogilvy, 13th Earl of Airlie	1 December 1984	31 December 1997		
Thomas Stonor, 7th Baron Camoys	1 January 1998	31 May 2000		
Richard Luce, Baron Luce	1 October 2000	15 October 2006		
William Peel, 3rd Earl Peel	16 October 2006	31 March 2021		
Andrew Parker, Baron Parker of Minsmere	1 April 2021	8 September 2022	His tenure carried over into the reign of King Charles III	

=== Lord Steward ===
The Lord Steward manages the Treasurer of the Household and Comptroller of the Household, who rank next to him. The appointee is always a peer, and is the first dignitary of the court.

Name	Began	Ended	Notes	Ref.
Douglas Douglas-Hamilton, 14th Duke of Hamilton	5 August 1952; tenure began 1 June 1940	1964	He began this position in 1940 under King George VI; his tenure carried over into Elizabeth II's reign	
Gerald Grosvenor, 4th Duke of Westminster	1964	1967		
Charles Lyttelton, 10th Viscount Cobham	1967	1972		
Hugh Percy, 10th Duke of Northumberland	1973	1988		
Matthew White Ridley, 4th Viscount Ridley	1989	2001		
James Hamilton, 5th Duke of Abercorn	2001	2009		
James Ramsay, 17th Earl of Dalhousie	2009	8 September 2022	His tenure carried over into the reign of King Charles III	

=== Master of the Horse ===
The Master of the Horse is the third dignitary of the court. It is a primarily ceremonial office, and rarely appears except on state occasions, and especially when the Sovereign is mounted.

Name	Entered office	Left office	Notes	Ref.
Henry Somerset, 10th Duke of Beaufort	5 August 1952	1972	He began this position in 1936 under King Edward VIII	
David Fane, 15th Earl of Westmorland	1978	1991		
Savile Crossley, 3rd Baron Somerleyton	1991	1998		
Samuel Vestey, 3rd Baron Vestey	1999	2018		
Rupert Ponsonby, 7th Baron de Mauley	1 January 2019	8 September 2022	His tenure carried over into the reign of King Charles III	

=== Treasurer of the Household ===
The Treasurer of the Household is usually held by one of the government deputy Chief Whips in the House of Commons. The Treasurer is automatically a member of the privy council.

Portrait	Name	Term of office		Party	Prime Minister
	Cedric Drewe	5 August 1952, had served as Treasurer of the Household since 26 October 1951	5 April 1955	Conservative	Sir Winston Churchill
	John Stradling Thomas	6 April 1955	9 January 1957	Unionist Party (Scotland)	Sir Anthony Eden
	Hendrie Oakshott	10 January 1957	16 January 1959	Conservative	Harold Macmillan
	Hon. Peter Legh	16 January 1959	21 June 1960	Conservative	Harold Macmillan
	Edward Wakefield	21 June 1960	March 1962	Conservative	Harold Macmillan
	Michael Hughes-Young	March 1962	16 October 1964	Conservative	Harold Macmillan (until 18 October 1963), Alec Douglas-Home (19 October 1963 – 16 October 1964)
	Sydney Irving	4 March 1974	4 May 1979	Labour and Co-operative	Harold Wilson
	John Silkin	11 April 1966	4 July 1966	Labour	Harold Wilson
	Charles Grey	4 July 1966	13 October 1969	Labour	Harold Wilson
	Charles Richard Morris	13 October 1969	18 June 1970	Labour	Harold Wilson
	Humphrey Atkins	18 June 1970	2 December 1973	Conservative	Edward Heath
	Bernard Weatherill	2 December 1973	4 March 1974	Conservative	Edward Heath
	Walter Harrison	4 March 1974	4 May 1979	Labour	Harold Wilson (4 March 1974 – 5 April 1976), James Callaghan (5 April 1976 – 4 May 1979)
	John Stradling Thomas	6 May 1979	11 February 1983	Conservative	Margaret Thatcher
	Anthony Berry	17 February 1983	11 June 1983	Conservative	Margaret Thatcher
	John Cope	11 June 1983	15 June 1987	Conservative	Margaret Thatcher
	David Hunt	15 June 1987	25 July 1989	Conservative	Margaret Thatcher
	Tristan Garel-Jones	25 July 1989	14 July 1990	Conservative	Margaret Thatcher
	Alastair Goodlad	14 July 1990	15 April 1992	Conservative	John Major
	David Heathcoat-Amory	15 April 1992	27 May 1993	Conservative	John Major
	Greg Knight	7 June 1993	23 July 1996	Conservative	John Major
	Andrew MacKay	23 July 1996	2 May 1997	Conservative	John Major
	George Mudie	2 May 1997	27 July 1998	Labour	Tony Blair
	Keith Bradley	27 July 1998	8 June 2001	Labour	Tony Blair
	Keith Hill	8 June 2001	23 June 2003	Labour	Tony Blair
	Bob Ainsworth	13 June 2003	28 June 2007	Labour	Tony Blair
	Nick Brown	28 June 2007	3 October 2008	Labour	Gordon Brown
	Tommy McAvoy	5 October 2008	11 May 2010	Labour	Gordon Brown
	Sir John Randall	11 May 2010	3 October 2013	Conservative	David Cameron
	Greg Hands	7 October 2013	11 May 2015	Conservative	David Cameron
	Anne Milton	11 May 2015	12 June 2017	Conservative	David Cameron
	Anne Milton	11 May 2015	12 June 2017	Conservative	Theresa May
	Julian Smith	13 June 2017	2 November 2017	Conservative	Theresa May
	Esther McVey	2 November 2017	9 January 2018	Conservative	Theresa May
	Christopher Pincher	9 January 2018	25 July 2019	Conservative	Theresa May
	Amanda Milling	28 July 2019	13 February 2020	Conservative	Boris Johnson
	Stuart Andrew	13 February 2020	8 February 2022	Conservative	Boris Johnson
	Christopher Pincher	8 February 2022	30 June 2022	Conservative	Boris Johnson
	Kelly Tolhurst	1 July 2022	7 September 2022	Conservative	Boris Johnson
	Craig Whittaker	8 September 2022	8 September 2022, His tenure carried over into the reign of King Charles III	Conservative	Liz Truss

=== Comptroller of the Household ===
The Comptroller of the Household is nominally the second-ranking member of the Lord Steward's department after the Treasurer of the Household. In recent times, a senior government whip has invariably occupied the office. On state occasions the Comptroller, in common with certain other senior officers of the Household, carries a white staff of office, as often seen in portraits.

Name	Entered office	Left office	Notes	Ref.
Roger John Edward Conant	5 August 1952, had served as Comptroller since 1951	1954		
Tam Galbraith	1954	1955		
Hendrie Oakshott	1955	1957		
Gerald Wills	1957	1958		
Sir Edward Wakefield, 1st Baronet	1958	16 January 1959		
Harwood Harrison	16 January 1959	6 July 1961		
Robin Chichester-Clark	6 July 1961	1964		
Charles Grey	1964	1966		
William Whitlock (politician)	1966	1967		
William Howie	1967	1968		
Ioan Evans	1968	1970		
Walter Elliot	1970	1970		
Reginald Eyre	1970	7 April 1972		
Bernard Weatherill	7 April 1972	2 December 1973		
Walter Clegg	2 December 1973	28 February 1974		
Joseph Harper	28 February 1974	24 June 1978		
James Hamilton	24 June 1978	7 May 1979		
Spencer Le Marchant	7 May 1979	30 September 1981		
Anthony Berry	30 September 1981	17 February 1983		
Carol Mather	17 February 1983	16 October 1986		
Robert Boscawen	16 October 1986	26 July 1988		
Tristan Garel-Jones	26 July 1988	25 July 1989		
Alastair Goodlad	25 July 1989	14 July 1990		
Sir George Young, 6th Baronet	14 July 1990	28 November 1990		
David Lightbown	28 November 1990	12 December 1995		
Timothy Wood	12 December 1995	2 May 1997		
Tommy McAvoy	2 May 1997	5 October 2008		
John Spellar	5 October 2008	11 May 2010		
Alistair Carmichael	11 May 2010	7 October 2013		
Don Foster	7 October 2013	11 May 2015		
Gavin Barwell	11 May 2015	17 July 2016		
Mel Stride	17 July 2016	2 June 2017		
Christopher Pincher	15 June 2017	5 November 2017		
Chris Heaton-Harris	9 January 2018	9 July 2018		
Mark Spencer	15 July 2018	34 July 2019		
Jeremy Quin	28 July 2019	6 December 2019		
Mike Freer	16 December 2019	6 September 2021		
Marcus Jones	17 September 2021	8 July 2022		
Rebecca Harris	8 July 2022	8 September 2022	Her tenure carried over into the reign of King Charles III	

=== Vice Chamberlain ===
The Vice-Chamberlain is usually a junior government whip in the British House of Commons and is the Deputy to the Lord Chamberlain. The Vice Chamberlain's main duties are to compile a daily private report for the Sovereign on the proceedings in the House of Commons and to transmit addresses from the Commons to the Sovereign and vice versa.

Name	Entered office	Left office	Notes	Reference
Henry Studholme	5 August 1952; tenure began 7 November 1951	1956	He began his tenure under King George VI	
Richard Thompson	1956	1957		
Peter Legh	1957	1959	Became Treasurer of the Household; succeeded as The Lord Newton in 1960	
Edward Wakefield	1959	1960	Became Treasurer of the Household	
Richard Brooman-White	1960	1960		
Graeme Finlay	1960	1964		
William Whitlock	1964	1966		
Jack McCann	1966	1967		
Charles Morris	1967	1969	Became Treasurer of the Household	
Alan Fitch	1969	1970		
Jasper More	1970	1971		
Bernard Weatherill	1971	1972	Became Comptroller of the Household; created The Lord Weatherill in 1992	
Walter Clegg	1972	1973	Became Comptroller of the Household	
Paul Hawkins	1973	1974		
Don Concannon	1974	1974		
James Hamilton	1974	1978	Became Comptroller of the Household	
Donald Coleman	1978	1979		
Anthony Berry	1979	1981	Became Comptroller of the Household	
Carol Mather	1981	1983	Became Comptroller of the Household	
Robert Boscawen	1983	1986	Became Comptroller of the Household	
Tristan Garel-Jones	1986	1988	Became Comptroller of the Household; created The Lord Garel-Jones in 1997	
Michael Neubert	1988	1988		
Tony Durant	1988	1990		
David Lightbown	1990	1990	Became Comptroller of the Household	
John Mark Taylor	1990	1992		
Sydney Chapman	1992	1995		
Timothy Kirkhope	1995	1996		
Andrew MacKay	1996	1996		
Derek Conway	1996	1997		
Janet Anderson	1997	1998		
Graham Allen	1998	2001		
Gerry Sutcliffe	2001	2003		
Jim Fitzpatrick	2003	2005		
John Heppell	2005	2007		
Liz Blackman	2007	2008		
Claire Ward	2008	2009		
Helen Jones	2009	2010		
Mark Francois	2010	2012		
Greg Knight	2012	2013	Previously Treasurer of the Household 1993-96	
Desmond Swayne	2013	2014		
Anne Milton	2014	2015		
Kris Hopkins	2015	2016		
Julian Smith	2016	2017	Became Treasurer of the Household	
Chris Heaton-Harris	2017	2018	Became Comptroller of the Household	
Mark Spencer	2018	2018	Became Comptroller of the Household	
Andrew Stephenson	2018	2019		
Craig Whittaker	2019	2019		
Stuart Andrew	2019	2020	Became Treasurer of the Household	
Marcus Jones	2020	2021	Became Comptroller of the Household	
James Morris	2021	2022		
Michael Tomlinson	2022	2022		
Jo Churchill	2022	2022	Her tenure carried over into the reign of King Charles III	

== Private Secretary's Office ==
=== Private Secretary to the Sovereign ===
5 August 1952: Sir Alan Lascelles

==== Assistant Private Secretaries ====
- 5 August 1952: Major Sir Michael Adeane
- 5 August 1952: Major Edward Ford
- 5 August 1952: Lieutenant-Colonel the Honourable Martin Charteris

=== Press Secretary ===
5 August 1952: Commander (S) Richard Colville

== Privy Purse and Treasurer's Office ==
=== Keeper of the Privy Purse and Treasurer to The Queen ===
5 August 1952: Sir James Ulick Alexander

==== Deputy Treasurer to The Queen and Secretary of the Privy Purse ====
5 August 1952: Commander (S) Sir Dudley Colles

==== Assistant Keeper of the Privy Purse ====
5 August 1952: Brigadier Charles George Vivian, Baron Tryon

=== Almonry ===
==== High Almoner ====
5 August 1952: Edward Sydney Woods, Bishop of Lichfield

==== Sub-Almoner ====
5 August 1952: The Reverend Maurice Foxell

=== Pages of Honour ===
- 5 August 1952: Henry Charles Seymour
- 5 August 1952: Michael Anson
- 5 August 1952: Jonathan Sidney Peel
- 5 August 1952: Henry Crichton, 6th Earl Erne

== Lord Chamberlain's Office ==
=== Comptroller, Lord Chamberlain's Office ===
5 August 1952: Lieutenant-Colonel Sir Terence Nugent

==== Assistant Comptroller, Lord Chamberlain's Office ====
5 August 1952: Brigadier Sir Norman Gwatkin

=== Royal Mews Department ===
==== Crown Equerry ====
5 August 1952: Colonel Sir Dermot McMorrough Kavanagh

=== Marshal of the Diplomatic Corps ===
5 August 1952: Major-General Guy Salisbury-Jones

==== Vice-Marshal of the Diplomatic Corps ====
5 August 1952: Marcus Cheke

==== Assistant Marshal of the Diplomatic Corps ====
5 August 1952: Captain Sir John Lindsay Dashwood, 10th Baronet

== The Master of the Household's Department ==
=== Master of the Household ===
- 5 August 1952: Lieutenant-Colonel Sir Piers Legh

== Lords in Waiting ==
- 5 August 1952: Colonel Clive Wigram, 1st Baron Wigram (Permanent)
- 5 August 1952: Rowland Baring, 2nd Earl of Cromer (Permanent)
- 5 August 1952: John Scott, 4th Earl of Eldon
- 5 August 1952: Wentworth Beaumont, 2nd Viscount Allendale
- 5 August 1952: Frederick Smith, 2nd Earl of Birkenhead.
- 5 August 1952: George Douglas-Hamilton, 10th Earl of Selkirk
- 5 August 1952: Alexander Lloyd, 2nd Baron Lloyd

== Equerries ==
=== Equerries ===
- 5 August 1952: Captain Sir Harold Campbell
- 5 August 1952: Major Sir Michael Adeane
- 1952-1954: Captain Edward Spencer, Viscount Althorp

=== Temporary Equerries ===
- 5 August 1952: Group Captain Peter Townsend
- 5 August 1952: Captain Edward Spencer, Viscount Althorp
- 5 August 1952: Captain the Right Honourable Patrick Plunket, 7th Baron Plunket

=== Extra Equerries ===
- 5 August 1952: Colonel Sir John Renton Aird, 3rd Baronet
- 5 August 1952: Sir James Ulick Alexander
- 5 August 1952: Commander Peter Ashmore
- 5 August 1952: Admiral Sir Hubert Brand
- 5 August 1952: Commander Colin Buist
- 5 August 1952: Admiral Sir Henry Buller
- 5 August 1952: Brigadier-General Sir Smith Child, 2nd Baronet
- 5 August 1952: Lieutenant-General Sir Sidney Clive
- 5 August 1952: Rowland Baring, 2nd Earl of Cromer
- 5 August 1952: Colonel Sir Arthur Erskine
- 5 August 1952: Admiral Sir Herbert Meade-Fetherstonhaugh
- 5 August 1952: Air Commodore Sir Edward Fielden
- 5 August 1952: Brigadier Walter Greenacre
- 5 August 1952: Brigadier Sir Norman Gwatkin
- 5 August 1952: Alexander Hardinge, 2nd Baron Hardinge of Penshurst
- 5 August 1952: Vice-Admiral Charles Lambe
- 5 August 1952: Lieutenant-Colonel Sir Piers Legh
- 5 August 1952: Major Thomas Coke, 5th Earl of Leicester
- 5 August 1952: Lieutenant-Colonel Douglas William Mackenzie
- 5 August 1952: Captain Charles Joseph Moore
- 5 August 1952: Lieutenant-Colonel Ririd Myddelton
- 5 August 1952: Admiral Sir Dudley North
- 5 August 1952: Lieutenant-Colonel Sir Terence Nugent
- 5 August 1952: Sir Arthur Horace Penn
- 5 August 1952: Sir George Ponsonby
- 5 August 1952: Rear-Admiral Conolly Abel Smith
- 5 August 1952: Colonel Clive Wigram, 1st Baron Wigram
- 29 March 1955: Brigadier-General Sir Harvey Kearsley

== Gentleman Ushers ==
- 5 August 1952: Captain Humphrey Lloyd
- 5 August 1952: Lieutenant-Colonel Henry Bache de Satge
- 5 August 1952: Rear-Admiral Sir Arthur Bromley
- 5 August 1952: Colonel Geoffrey Codrington
- 5 August 1952: Captain William Phipps
- 5 August 1952: Captain (S) Sir Frank Spickernell
- 5 August 1952: Captain Philip Neville
- 5 August 1952: Brigadier Guy Rasch
- 5 August 1952: Air Vice-Marshal Sir George Reid

=== Extra Gentlemen Ushers ===
- 5 August 1952: Major Gerald Ellis
- 5 August 1952: Lieutenant-Colonel Sir Arthur D'Arcy
- 5 August 1952: Sir Arthur Bannerman, 12th Baronet
- 5 August 1952: Group Captain Sir Louis Greig
- 5 August 1952: Major John Spencer Coke
- 5 August 1952: Captain Charles Irvine
- 5 August 1952: Sir John Hanbury-Williams
- 5 August 1952: Sir John Monck
- 5 August 1952: Sir Algar Henry Stafford Howard
- 5 August 1952: Captain Andrew Yates
- 5 August 1952: Major Thomas Harvey
- 5 August 1952: Lieutenant-Colonel Frederick Packe

=== Gentleman Usher to the Sword of State ===
5 August 1952: Air Chief Marshal Sir Arthur Barratt

== Ecclesiastical Household ==
=== College of Chaplains ===
==== Clerk of the Closet ====
5 August 1952: Percy Herbert, Bishop of Norwich.

==== Deputy Clerk of the Closet ====
5 August 1952: Maurice Foxell

==== Chaplains ====
- 5 August 1952: Canon Travers Guy Rogers
- 5 August 1952: Canon Charles Earle Raven
- 5 August 1952: Arthur Rowland Harry Grant
- 5 August 1952: Canon William Phythian-Adams
- 5 August 1952: Tubby Clayton
- 5 August 1952: Canon Leonard Martin Andrews
- 5 August 1952: Canon Henry Spencer Stephenson
- 5 August 1952: Canon Frank Gillingham
- 5 August 1952: Thomas Layng
- 5 August 1952: Henry FitzHerbert
- 5 August 1952: Canon Sidney Swann
- 5 August 1952: Reginald French
- 5 August 1952: Canon Ellis Partington
- 5 August 1952: Frederick Boreham
- 5 August 1952: Canon John Campbell
- 5 August 1952: Albert Baillie
- 5 August 1952: Canon Stretton Reeve
- 5 August 1952: Robert Reginald Churchill
- 5 August 1952: Humphrey Barclay
- 5 August 1952: Ralph Creed Meredith
- 5 August 1952: Charles Ritchie
- 5 August 1952: Prebendary Walter Arrowsmith
- 5 August 1952: Prebendary Hubert Treacher
- 5 August 1952: Canon Ian White-Thomson
- 5 August 1952: Prebendary George Saywell
- 5 August 1952: Canon Eric Abbott
- 5 August 1952: Canon Wallace Elliott
- 5 August 1952: Canon Ralph Whytehead
- 5 August 1952: Peter Gillingham
- 5 August 1952: Mervyn Charles-Edwards
- 5 August 1952: Canon Leslie Mannering
- 5 August 1952: Selwyn Bean
- 5 August 1952: Canon John Richardson
- 5 August 1952: Canon Robert Stopford

=== Chapels Royal ===
==== Dean ====
5 August 1952: William Wand, Bishop of London.

==== Sub-Dean ====
5 August 1952: Maurice Foxell

==== Priests ====
- 5 August 1952: Cyril Armitage
- 5 August 1952: Erik Donne
- 5 August 1952: George Sage

==== Deputy-Priests ====
- 5 August 1952: Michael Ridley
- 5 August 1952: Canon Anthony Lewis Elliott Williams
- 5 August 1952: Cyril Dams

==== Honorary Priest ====
5 August 1952: Trevitt Hine-Haycock

==== Organist, Choirmaster and Composer at Her Majesty's Chapels Royal ====
5 August 1952: Edgar Roper, Esquire

==== Domestic Chaplains ====
- 5 August 1952: Maurice Foxell (Buckingham Palace)
- 5 August 1952: Eric Hamilton, Dean of Windsor (Windsor Castle)
- 5 August 1952: Hector Anderson (Sandringham)

==== Chaplain, Royal Chapel, Windsor Great Park ====
5 August 1952: Peter Gillingham

==== Chaplain, Hampton Court Palace ====
5 August 1952: Prebendary Herbert Harris

==== Organist, Hampton Court Palace ====
5 August 1952: William James Phillips

=== Chaplains in Scotland ===
- 5 August 1952: Charles Warr
- 5 August 1952: James Cockburn
- 5 August 1952: Andrew Nevile Davidson
- 5 August 1952: John Baillie
- 5 August 1952: William Anderson
- 5 August 1952: Thomas Thomson
- 5 August 1952: James Pitt Watson
- 5 August 1952: James Stuart Stewart
- 5 August 1952: John Fraser

==== Domestic Chaplain ====
5 August 1952: John Lamb (Balmoral).

== Medical Household ==
=== Physicians ===
- 5 August 1952: Horace Evans, 1st Baron Evans (died 26 October 1963).
- 5 August 1952: Sir John Weir (retired 31 December 1968).
- 5 August 1952: Sir Ronald Scott (until 1973).
- 17 March 1964: William Mann (succeeding Lord Evans; resigned 20 March 1970).
- 31 December 1968: Margery Blackie (retired 31 October 1980).
- 20 March 1970: Richard Bayliss (until 1982).
- December 1974: Sir John Batten (until 1989).
- 31 October 1980: Charles Elliott (retired 20 March 1986).
- 2 January 1982: Anthony Dawson (until 1993).
- 20 March 1986: Ronald Davey (until 2001).
- 1993: Richard Thompson (until 2005).
- 2001: Peter Fisher (died 15 August 2018).
- 2005: Professor John Cunningham (until 2014).
- 2014: Sir Huw Thomas.

==== Physicians to the Household ====
- 17 March 1964: Richard Bayliss (promoted 20 March 1970).
- 20 March 1970: John Batten (promoted December 1974).
- December 1974: Anthony Dawson (promoted 2 January 1982).
- 2 January 1982: Richard Thompson (promoted 1993).

==== Physician-Paediatrician ====
- 5 August 1952: Wilfrid Percy Henry Sheldon (1 January 1972).
- 1 January 1972: Philip Evans (until 1976).

==== Extra Physicians ====
- 5 August 1952: Thomas Horder, 1st Baron Horder
- 5 August 1952: Sir Henry Tidy
- 5 August 1952: Sir Daniel Davies

=== Sergeant-Surgeon ===
- 5 August 1952: Sir Arthur Porritt
- 1 September 1967: Sir Ralph Marnham
- 1 January 1972: Sir Edward Muir
- 20 March 1973: Sir Edward Tuckwell
- 12 May 1975: Sir Hugh Evelyn Lockhart-Mummery
- 29 April 1983: William Slack
- 23 February 1990: John Leonard Dawson
- 22 February 1991: Barry Jackson (retired 2001).
- 3 December 2001: Adam Lewis (retired 1 November 2006).
- 4 January 2007: Roger Vickers (until 2010).
- 25 July 2010: Sir George Hamilton.
- 10 August 2016: Satya Bhattacharya

==== Surgeons ====
- 5 August 1952: Sir James Ross (retired 17 March 1964).
- 5 August 1952: Ralph Marnham (promoted 1 September 1967).
- 17 March 1964: Edward Muir (promoted 1 January 1972).
- January 1969: Edward Tuckwell (promoted 20 March 1973).
- December 1974: Hugh Lockhart-Mummery (also Surgeon to Her Majesty's Household; promoted 12 May 1975)
- 12 May 1975: William Slack (promoted 29 April 1983).
- 29 April 1983: John Dawson (promoted 23 February 1990).
- Roger Vickers (promoted 4 January 2007).
- 4 January 2007: George Hamilton (promoted 25 July 2010).

==== Surgeon to Her Majesty's Household ====
- 17 March 1964: Edward Tuckwell
- January 1969: Hugh Lockhart-Mummery
- 12 May 1975: John Dawson
- 29 April 1983: Barry Jackson
- 22 February 1991: Adam Lewis
- George Hamilton (promoted 4 January 2007).
- 4 January 2007: Satyajit Bhattacharya
- 10 August 2016: Ian Jenkins

==== Surgeon-Gynaecologist/Surgeon-Gynaecologist to the Queen ====
- 5 August 1952: Sir William Gilliatt
- 11 July 1961: Sir John Peel (retired March 1973).
- March 1973: Sir George Pinker (retired 30 March 1990).
- 30 March 1990: Marcus Setchell (until 2014).
- 30 June 2014: Alan Farthing (incumbent).

==== Surgeon-Gynaecologist to the Household ====
- 18 November 2008: Alan Farthing (promoted 30 June 2014).
- 30 June 2008: Guy Thorpe-Beeston (incumbent).

==== Extra Surgeons ====
- 5 August 1952: Sir Thomas Peel Dunhill
- 5 August 1952: Sir James Walton
- 5 August 1952: Sir Lancelot Barrington-Ward

==== Extra Manipulative Surgeon ====
- 5 August 1952: Sir Morton Smart

==== Extra Surgeon-Apothecary ====
- 5 August 1952: Sir Frederick Hewett

==== Surgeon-Oculist/Surgeon-Oculist to the Queen ====
- 5 August 1952: Sir Stewart Duke-Elder (resigned 30 April 1965).
- 30 April 1965: Allen Goldsmith (retired 27 November 1974).
- 27 November 1974: Stephen Miller (retired 21 July 1980).
- 21 July 1980: Sir Patrick Sellors (retired 3 February 1999).
- 3 February 1999: Timothy ffytche (retired 7 March 2002).
- 7 March 2002: Jonathan Jagger (incumbent).

==== Extra Orthopaedic Surgeon ====
- 5 August 1952: Sir Reginald Watson-Jones

==== Aurist ====
- 5 August 1952: John McLaggan
- 11 July 1961: James Hogg

==== Surgeon-Dentist ====
- 5 August 1952: Sir Alan McLeod (retired 1 September 1975).
- 1 September 1975: Nicholas Sturridge (retired 19 July 2007).

==== Extra Physician to the Household ====
- 5 August 1952: Sir Arnold Stott

==== Surgeon-Oculist to the Household ====
- 5 August 1952: Allen Goldsmith (promoted 30 April 1965).
- 30 April 1965: Stephen Miller (promoted 27 November 1974).
- 27 November 1974: Patrick Sellors (promoted 21 July 1980).
- 21 July 1980: Timothy ffytche (promoted 3 February 1999).
- 3 February 1999: Jonathan Jagger (promoted 7 March 2002).
- 1 January 2002: Veronica Ferguson (incumbent).

==== Extra Surgeon-Oculist to the Household ====
- 5 August 1952: Frank Juler
- 30 April 1965: Sir Stewart Duke-Elder.

==== Apothecary to the Household ====
- 5 August 1952: Sir John Nigel Loring (retired 1 October 1964).
- 1 October 1964: Sir Ralph Southward (retired 1 January 1975).
- 1 January 1975: Nigel Southward (retired 7 February 2003).
- 7 February 2003: Timothy Evans (incumbent).

==== Surgeon-Apothecary to the Household at Windsor ====
- 5 August 1952: Richard May (resigned 9 March 1965).
- 9 March 1965: John Clayton (retired 13 July 1986).
- 13 July 1986: John Briscoe (retired 29 June 1997).
- 29 June 1997: Jonathan Holliday.

==== Extra Surgeon-Apothecary to the Household at Windsor ====
- 5 August 1952: Edmund Maiden

==== Surgeon-Apothecary to the Household at Sandringham ====
- 5 August 1952: James Ansell (resigned 1 November 1965).
- 1 November 1965: Hugh Ford (retired 22 February 1992).
- 22 February 1992: Ian Campbell.

== Medical Household in Scotland ==
=== Physicians ===
- 5 August 1952: Greig Anderson
- 5 August 1952: Sir John McNee
- 5 August 1952: Stanley Davidson

=== Surgeons ===
- 5 August 1952: Sir James Learmonth
- 5 August 1952: George Bruce

==== Surgeon-Oculist ====
- 5 August 1952: John Marshall

==== Surgeon-Dentist ====
- 5 August 1952: Robert Dow

==== Surgeon-Apothecary to the Household at Balmoral ====
- 5 August 1952: George Middleton

==== Surgeon-Apothecary to the Household at the Palace of Holyroodhouse ====
Surgeon-Apothecaries/Apothecaries to HM Household at the Palace of Holyroodhouse

- 1908 – 1922: W.B. Alexander (1844 – 1922)
- 1923 – 1929: D.J. Graham (1871 – 1929
- 1930: W.M. Taylor (1872 – 1930
- 1931 – 1951: N.J. Carmichael (1883 – 1951
- 1952 – 1970: G. Brewster (1899 – 1991
- 1970 – 1986: D.G. Illingworth (1921 – 2010)
- 1987 – 1990: H.H. Gebbie (b. 1930)
- 1991 – 2001: J.J.C. Cormack (1934 – 2002)
- 2001—: J.R. Robertson (b. 1951)
- 2016—: Robin Balfour (b. 1961)

== Military establishment ==
=== Gentlemen-at-Arms ===
==== Captain ====
5 August 1952: Colonel Hugh Fortescue, 5th Earl Fortescue

==== Lieutenant ====
5 August 1952: Brigadier-General Sir Harvey Kearsley

==== Clerk of the Cheque and Adjutant ====
- 5 August 1952: Lieutenant-Colonel Osbert Vesey
- 2016: Christopher Mackenzie-Beevor

==== Gentlemen of the Corps ====
- 5 August 1952: Colonel Sir Edward Le Breton.
- 5 August 1952: Lieutenant-Colonel Ughtred Carnegy Carnegy
- 5 August 1952: Brigadier Harold Charrington
- 5 August 1952: Major Sir Henry Aubrey-Fletcher
- 5 August 1952: Lieutenant-Colonel William Cuninghame
- 5 August 1952: Lieutenant-Colonel Arthur Butler, 6th Marquess of Ormonde
- 5 August 1952: Colonel Bartle Edwards
- 5 August 1952: Colonel Robert Walsh
- 5 August 1952: Brigadier Lancelot Gibbs
- 5 August 1952: Lieutenant-Colonel Rupert Glynn
- 5 August 1952: Colonel Edward Digby, 11th Baron Digby
- 5 August 1952: Brigadier Henry Walter Houldsworth
- 5 August 1952: Lieutenant-Colonel John Colvin
- 5 August 1952: Lieutenant-Colonel Kenneth Previte
- 5 August 1952: Brigadier Thomas Fairfax-Ross
- 5 August 1952: Major-General William Fox-Pitt
- 5 August 1952: Brigadier John Cheney
- 5 August 1952: Lieutenant-Colonel Francis Fulford.
- 5 August 1952: Brigadier Sir Henry Floyd, 5th Baronet
- 5 August 1952: Colonel Sir Robert Gooch, 11th Baronet
- 5 August 1952: Lieutenant-Colonel William Amory
- 5 August 1952: Colonel Sir John Carew Pole, 12th Baronet
- 5 August 1952: Brigadier Robert Daniell
- 5 August 1952: Brigadier Anthony Pepys
- 5 August 1952: Lieutenant-Colonel Sir William Makins, 3rd Baronet

=== Yeomen of the Guard ===
==== Captain ====
5 August 1952: William Onslow, 6th Earl of Onslow

==== Lieutenant ====
5 August 1952: Major-General Sir Allan Adair, 6th Baronet

==== Clerk of the Cheque and Adjutant ====
5 August 1952: Lieutenant-Colonel Ralph Bingham

==== Ensign ====
5 August 1952: Lieutenant-Colonel Victor Turner

==== Exons ====
5 August 1952: Brigadier William Carr Lieutenant-Colonel Gerald Grosvenor, 4th Duke of Westminster

== Other appointments ==
=== Groom in Waiting ===
- 5 August 1952: Sir Arthur Horace Penn

==== Extra Groom in Waiting ====
- 5 August 1952: Montague Eliot, 8th Earl of St Germans

=== Groom of the Robes ===
5 August 1952: Captain Sir Harold Campbell

=== Parliament ===
==== Gentleman Usher of the Black Rod ====
5 August 1952: Lieutenant-General Sir Brian Horrocks

==== Sergeants-at-Arms ====
- 5 August 1952: George Titman
- 5 August 1952: Lieutenant-Commander (S) Albert Stone
- 5 August 1952: George Frederick Thomas Hopkins, Esquire
- - February 2018: Brian Stanley

==== Sergeant-at-Arms, House of Lords ====
5 August 1952: Air Vice-Marshal Sir Paul Maltby

==== Sergeant-at-Arms, House of Commons ====
5 August 1952: Brigadier Sir Charles Howard

=== The Queen's Archives ===
==== Keeper ====
5 August 1952: Sir Alan Lascelles

==== Librarian ====
5 August 1952: Sir Owen Morshead

=== Keeper of the Jewel House, Tower of London ===
5 August 1952: Major-General Hervey Sitwell

=== Surveyor of The Queen's Pictures ===
5 August 1952: Professor Anthony Blunt

==== Deputy Surveyor of The Queen's Pictures ====
5 August 1952: Oliver Millar

=== Surveyor of The Queen's Works of Art ===
5 August 1952: Sir James Mann 10 July 2019:Caroline de Guitaut. Appointed as deputy Surveyor of the Queen's Works of Art. Appointed Surveyor of the King's Works of Art in 2024. Responsible for over 700,000 works of art, in 13 royal palaces, including the King's official residences: Buckingham Palace, Windsor Castle, Palace of Holyroodhouse. 1st woman to hold the position.

=== Master of the Queen's Music ===
5 August 1952: Sir Arnold Bax

=== Poet Laureate ===
5 August 1952: John Masefield

=== Honorary Veterinary Surgeons ===
- 5 August 1952: Captain Thomas Wright
- 5 August 1952: Edmond Paterson

=== Coroner of the Household ===
5 August 1952: Lieutenant-Colonel William Hilgrove Leslie McCarthy

=== Captain of The Queen's Flight ===
5 August 1952: Air Commodore Sir Edward Fielden 15 February 1968: Air Commodore Sir Archibald Winskill

=== Her Majesty's Representative at Ascot ===
5 August 1952: Bernard Fitzalan-Howard, 16th Duke of Norfolk
