= John Lockhart-Mummery =

British surgeon

John Lockhart-Mummery FRCS
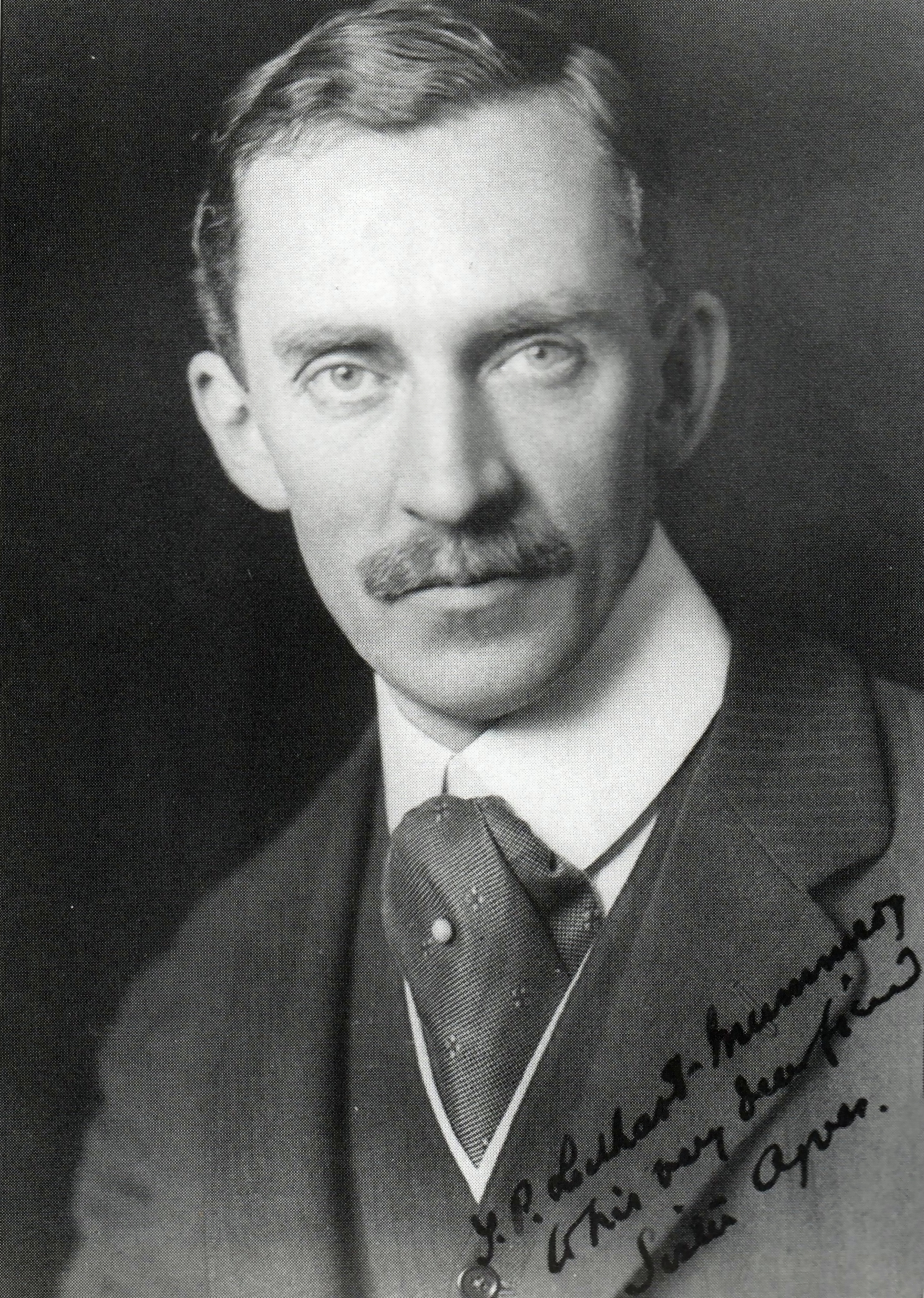
- John Percy Lockhart-Mummery
- Born: 14 February 1875; Islip Manor, Northolt, England
- Died: 24 April 1957 (aged 82); Hove, Sussex, England
- Education: The Leys School
- Relatives: John Howard Mummery (father); Hugh Evelyn Lockhart-Mummery (son)
- Medical career
- Profession: Surgeon
- Institutions: St Mark's Hospital; King Edward VII's Hospital Sister Agnes
- Sub-specialties: Oncology, proctology

John Percy Lockhart-Mummery FRCS (14 February 1875 – 24 April 1957), was a British surgeon at St Mark's Hospital, London, who devised a classification of rectal cancer and described familial polyposis which led to the formation of the polyposis registry. He was the author of several books, including Diseases of the Rectum and Colon and their Surgical Treatment (1923), The Origin of Cancer (1934), and After Us, or the World as it Might Be (1936). His work on colorectal surgery earned him the nickname "King Rectum".

Lockhart-Mummery's grandfather, his brother, and his father, John Howard Mummery, were all dental surgeons. While studying at Cambridge he developed sarcoma of his leg, for which Joseph Lister carried out an amputation. He completed his clinical training in 1899 at St George's Hospital, London, and in 1904 was appointed Hunterian Professor at the Royal College of Surgeons. He showed that sigmoidoscopy was safe and effective in looking for diseases of the large bowel. During the First World War he operated at King Edward VII's Hospital Sister Agnes, where he treated mainly gunshot wounds affecting the colon, rectum and anus.

Lockhart-Mummery was the first secretary of the British Proctological Society, which in 1939, became a section of the Royal Society of Medicine (RSM). Some of his theories on cancer and eugenics are controversial, and were thought of as radical at that time, even by his friend Lord Horder, president of the Eugenics Society. He was also a friend of H. G. Wells, with whom he shared some beliefs about the role of science in the problems of the human body.

== Early life and education ==
John Lockhart Mummery (later Lockhart-Mummery), was born in Islip Manor, Northolt, on 14 February 1875 to John Howard Mummery, a dental surgeon, and his first wife Mary Lily. His paternal grandfather was a dental surgeon, and his younger brother, Stanley, also became a dental surgeon.

He was educated first at Eagle House School and then The Leys School. Subsequently, he gained admission to Gonville and Caius College, Cambridge, passing the first part of the Natural Sciences Tripos in 1897 with second-class honours. During his time at Cambridge he developed sarcoma of his leg, for which Joseph Lister carried out an amputation. Subsequently, he took up a post as assistant anatomy demonstrator at Cambridge. He completed his clinical training in 1899 at St George's Hospital, London, where he won the Thompson gold medal and completed resident posts there. In 1900 he gained a Fellowship.

== Early career ==
Lockhart-Mummery worked at the North Eastern Hospital for Children at Hackney and at the King Edward VII Hospital for Officers. In 1903 he was appointed to the staff of St Mark's Hospital, London. The following year he was Hunterian Professor at the Royal College of Surgeons, where he spoke on the physiology and treatment of surgical shock and collapse, drawing on his book After-treatment of Operations (1903), which ran into four editions and was translated into a number of languages including Arabic.

In 1904 he revealed improvements in sigmoidoscopy, and subsequently showed it was safe and effective in looking for diseases of the large bowel. He won the Jacksonian Prize for 1909 for his essay on diseases of the colon, which he published in 1910 as Diseases of the Colon and their Surgical Treatment and later combined with Diseases of the Rectum and Anus: A practical handbook (1914) to produce Diseases of the Rectum and Colon and their Surgical Treatment (1923). It was published by Baillière, Tindall & Cox and a second edition was produced in 1934.

In 1913, upon Swinford Edwards' retirement, Lockhart-Mummery became senior surgeon at St Mark's. The following year and a few days before the start of the First World War, Sister Agnes of King Edward VII Hospital for Officers, drew up a list of 21 honorary staff to treat wounded officers at 9 Grosvenor Gardens without a fee. Lockhart-Mummery became a significant name on the list, probably carried out more operations at the hospital than any other surgeon there, and treated mainly gunshot wounds affecting the colon, rectum and anus. Among officers he treated was Major Horace Sewell, who had been injured in May 1915 and required shell casing removing from the thigh. When Leonard Tyrwhitt was wounded by a Mauser bullet above his left knee, it was Lockhart-Mummery who removed it. On Armistice Day, he operated twice. His work on colorectal surgery earned him the nickname "King Rectum".

== Later career ==
Despite operating on the most rich and famous of London of the time, operating on the colon, rectum and anus was not fashionable to discuss. In 1924 he started the Polyposis Registry with Cuthbert Dukes, which kept data on people with inherited multiple polyps. In 1925 his systematic study of people and their families demonstrated a genetic explanation for the association between people with multiple bowel polyps and bowel cancer, 20 years after polyposis was first suggested to be a familial condition by William Harrison Cripps of St Bartholomew's Hospital. Lockhart-Mummery was a co-founder and key figure in the 1923 British Empire Cancer Campaign, in which he remained active for the rest of his life and which slanted more clinically than the rival scientific Imperial Cancer Research Fund, who had their own significant figures including Walter Morley Fletcher and Frederick Gowland Hopkins.

He believed that pruritus ani had a local cause and not a general cause as believed by others such as Lord Horder. In 1939 he described rectal prolapse in children. He also practised in Harley Street.

== Theories ==
Lockhart-Mummery's understanding of cancer, reflected in his frequent use of metaphors such as "Bolshevist", "communist" and "utopian", in his explanation of the origin of cancer, led to cancer being seen as an infectious disease, something that could be passed from one generation to another, spreading its way through society. In The Origin of Cancer, he wrote "the cancer cell may be compared with the citizen of a country who suddenly becomes a communist". On two occasions he had disagreements with William Ewart Gye.

Some of his theories on race and eugenics were also controversial. Although he did not practice eugenics, Lockhart-Mummery had held the view that families with polyposis would eventually die out and wrote in one review with Dukes, that "one may hope that polyposis families will remain small and finally die out as the result of celibacy or the adoption of eugenic principles". In 1935, he defended Lord Dawson's views on eugenics and argued that "human genetics must inevitably become the most important social and scientific problem in the next few decades, since it must be solved if the human race is to make any serious progress towards something better". In his book After Us, or the World as it Might Be (1936), he imagined a world where "all men, except those approximating the ideal citizen" would be sterilised, and women would conceive children from the remaining stock, in order to produce "perfection". In the book, he accused "sloppy sentiment" as preventing this method and argued that the nation would have to wait for an "autocratic government" to enforce it for the advantage of men. Such theories were thought of as radical at that time, considered so even by his friend Lord Horder, president of the Eugenics Society.

He described what he called the 'morbid state of mind' or 'rectal neuralgia or hysteria', a condition later better known as irritable bowel syndrome. He was a friend of H. G. Wells, with whom he shared some beliefs about the role of science in the problems of the human body. He dismissed Arthur Todd's developments of chemotherapy for bowel cancer.

== Other roles ==
In 1913 he became the first secretary of the British Proctological Society, which in 1939, became a section of the Royal Society of Medicine (RSM). In 1921, at the British Medical Association's annual meeting, he became president of the section of proctology and of the section of children's diseases at the RSM. In 1930, Lockhart-Mummery became a member of King Edward VII's Hospital's first council, formed by Sister Agnes. He was active in promoting the London International Cancer Conference of 1928, and published The Origin of Cancer in 1934. In all he wrote six books on colorectal surgery and two on other non-medial topics.

Lockhart-Mummery retired in 1935, becoming emeritus surgeon to St Mark's. In the same year, the Collected Papers, published to celebrate the 100 year anniversary of St Mark's, included his work.

== Personal and family ==
Lockhart-Mummery enjoyed fishing, played golf and later bowls. He once won the Dog Derby with one of his greyhounds.

From his first marriage to Cynthia in 1915, he had two sons, Hugh Evelyn Lockhart-Mummery, a surgeon who succeeded him at St Mark's Hospital and was later Serjeant-Surgeon to The Queen and knighted; and Robert Desmond. His second marriage, in 1932, was to Georgette. Following retirement he moved to Hove in East Sussex.

== Death and legacy ==
Lockhart-Mummery died in Hove on 24 April 1957. He received an obituary in the British Medical Journal, and biographical profiles in the RCSE's Plarr's Lives of the Fellows, and in Diseases of the Colon & Rectum.

== Selected publications ==
=== Articles ===
- Mummery, P. L. (26 May 1906). "The Treatment of Shock and Collapse Following Surgical Operations". The Hospital. 40 (1026): 135–138. ISSN 0267-6478. PMC 5214415. PMID 29821401.
- "The Hunterian Lectures on the physiology and treatment of surgical shock and collapse". The Lancet. 165 (4255): 696–703. 18 March 1905. doi:10.1016/S0140-6736(01)45741-2. ISSN 0140-6736.
- Lockhart-Mummery, P. (21 August 1915). "The causes and treatment of pruritus ani". British Medical Journal. 2 (2851): 291–293. doi:10.1136/bmj.2.2851.291. ISSN 0007-1447. PMC 2303104. PMID 20767778.
- Mummery, P. Lockhart (1915). "Injuries to the Bowel from Shell and Bullet Wounds". Proceedings of the Royal Society of Medicine. 8 (Surg Sect): 8–12. doi:10.1177/003591571500801904. ISSN 0035-9157. PMC 2002848. PMID 19979071.
- Lockhart-Mummery, J. P. (1926). "Two hundred cases of cancer of the rectum treated by perineal excision". British Journal of Surgery. 14 (53): 110–124. doi:10.1002/bjs.1800145312. ISSN 1365-2168. S2CID 9311375.

=== Books ===
- The After-treatment of Operations: A Manual for Practitioners and House Surgeons. Baillière & Co., London, 1903.
- The Sigmoidoscope: A clinical handbook on the examination of the rectum and pelvic colon. Baillière, Tindall and Cox, London, 1906.
- Diseases of the Colon and their Surgical Treatment. John Wright & Sons, Bristol, 1910.
- Diseases of the Rectum and Anus: A practical handbook. Baillière, Tindall & Cox, London, 1914.
- Diseases of the Rectum and Colon and their Surgical Treatment. Baillière, Tindall & Cox, London, 1923. (2nd edition 1934)
- The Origin of Cancer. J. & A. Churchill, London, 1934.
- The Collected Papers of St. Mark's Hospital, London, Including a History of the Hospital: Centenary Volume, 1835-1935. H. K. Lewis & Co. Ltd., London, 1935.
- After Us, or the World as it Might Be. Stanley Paul, London, 1936.
- Nothing New Under the Sun. Andrew Melrose, London & New York, 1947.

== See also ==
- List of honorary medical staff at King Edward VII's Hospital for Officers
