= After Us, or the World as it Might Be =

Collection of futurology essays by John Lockhart-Mummery

- Frontispiece
- Author: John Lockhart-Mummery
- Language: English
- Published: 1936
- Publisher: Stanley Paul
- Publication place: United Kingdom
- Pages: 287

After Us, or the World as it Might Be, also known as After Us, is a collection of essays in futurology written by British surgeon John Lockhart-Mummery, and published by London's Stanley Paul in 1936.

In it, Lockhart-Mummery imagines Britain as it might be in the 25th century using the device of a series of letters home from a New Zealander. He imagines a world where all male children are sterilised shortly after birth, except for those carefully selected. Those exempt from compulsory sterilisation would provide the "seed" for future generations by artificial insemination.

The book has 287 pages and begins with a preface followed by a list of 24 chapter titles. The foreword is given by the author's friend Lord Horder, president of the Eugenics Society, who thought Lockhart-Mummery's theories radical.

== Publication ==
After Us, or the World as it Might Be is a collection of essays in futurology written by British surgeon John Lockhart-Mummery, and published by Stanley Paul in 1936. It has 287 pages and begins with a preface followed by a list of the 24 chapters which cover a wide range of topics.

== Content ==
The foreword is by Lord Horder, a friend of Lockhart-Mummery, and president of the British Eugenics Society, who notes that the chapter titles reflect several of their past discussions, and that Lockhart-Mummery has been "as violently controversial and provocative as possible" and leaves him "a little shocked".

In the book, Lockhart-Mummery imagines Britain as it might be in the 25th century using the device of a series of letters home from a New Zealander. His central concern is over-population resulting from man's conquest of the natural world and the risk to man's future from disease or famine. He argues that either new sources of food will have to be developed or population will have to be controlled, and for that reason welcomes the increasing use of contraception.

Lockhart-Mummery envisages government control of reproduction and imagines a world where "all men, except those approximating the ideal citizen" would be sterilised, and women would breed from the remaining stock, in order to produce "perfection". In the fourth chapter titled "preferential breeding", he proposes that all male children should be sterilised shortly after birth, except for those carefully selected to exclude "bad hereditary factors". Those exempt from compulsory sterilisation he writes, "will become the fathers of the next generation". In the following chapter titled "the perfect child", he explains how any woman desiring to have a child will have to apply to authorities for permission to receive in hospital, by artificial insemination, the "seed" of her chosen "sire", providing she herself produces the required information about her own "pedigree". If pregnancy does not occur she will be allowed to try again. He thought the separation of sexual love from reproduction would have profound social implications for society and possibly give women greater independence.

Lockhart-Mummery had previously defended Lord Dawson's views on eugenics and argued that "human genetics must inevitably become the most important social and scientific problem in the next few decades, since it must be solved if the human race is to make any serious progress towards something better". In the book, he attributes the failure to adopt his policies to "sloppy sentiment" and argues that they will not be adopted until an "autocratic government" arises with the will to act in the interests of all men.

== Reviews ==
The English Review felt that Lockhart-Mummery was on firmer ground in the chapters on medicine than those on finance or industry, but overall felt that although provocative, the book had a lot to say that was worthy of attention. In Man, Canning Suffern felt that Lockhart-Mummery's work, along with that of Aldous Huxley's Brave New World, owed a lot to J. B. S. Haldane's Daedelus (1924) in attempting to predict how scientific progress would affect mankind's future, but that Lockhart-Mummery did not fully explore all the implications of his ideas, particularly how they would affect the position of women in society.
