= James Crerar =

British administrator

Sir James Crerar, KCSI, CIE (11 December 1877 – 29 August 1960) was a British administrator in India. A member of the Indian Civil Service, he was Home Member of the Viceroy's Executive Council from 1927 until 1932.

His son-in-law was Sir Hugh Lockhart-Mummery, Serjeant-Surgeon to The Queen.
