= William Slack =

William Slack is the name of:

- William Slack (surgeon) (1925–2019), Serjeant Surgeon to Queen Elizabeth II
- William Y. Slack (1816–1862), lawyer, politician, and general in the Missouri State Guard
