= Gloria Laycock =

- Born: New Brighton, Merseyside
- Occupations: Professor, Jill Dando Institute of Crime Science, University College London
- Website: Jill Dando Institute; UCL Centre for Security & Crime; University College London

Gloria Laycock OBE is the founding Director of the Jill Dando Institute of Crime Science at University College London (UCL), and ran UCL's Centre for Security & Crime Science. She is an internationally renowned expert in crime prevention, and especially situational approaches which seek to design out situations which provoke crime.

She was born in New Brighton and raised in Liverpool, England, and graduated in Psychology from UCL in 1968. She began her career as a prison psychologist, and in 1975 she completed her PhD, working at Wormwood Scrubs prison in West London. Building on her PhD research, she commenced work in the late 1970s at the Home Office Research Unit where she stayed for over thirty years, dedicating the last twenty to research and development in the policing and crime prevention fields.

She founded the Home Office Police Research Group, and edited its publications on policing and crime prevention for seven years. Alongside working in Britain, she has been a consultant on policing and crime prevention in North and South America, Australia, New Zealand, Israel, South Africa, the UAE and Europe. She was an advisor to HEUNI, a UN affiliated crime prevention organisation based in Helsinki from 2001 until 2012.

In 1999 she was awarded an International Fellowship by the United States National Institute of Justice in Washington DC, followed by a four-month consultancy at the Australian Institute of Criminology in Canberra. She returned to the UK to become the founding director of the Jill Dando Institute of Crime Science in 2001. The institute engages a wide range of sciences and design experts in cross-disciplinary work in collaboration with police and industry to find new ways to reduce crime.

Professor Laycock's contributions cover a wide range of policing and crime prevention topics, including the development of a research programme on repeat crime victimisation. The prevention of repeat victimisation became an important indicator of policing performance and effectiveness in the United Kingdom.

In 2010 she left UCL on special leave and was appointed to improve policing in the United Arab Emirates. In 2013 she returned to UCL where she is now the Jill Dando Professor of Crime Science.

She was appointed Officer of the Order of the British Empire (OBE) in the 2008 Birthday Honours.
