= Cuthbert Dukes =

English pathologist

- Dukes next to his microscope
- Born: 24 July 1890; Bridgwater, Somerset,
- Died: 3 February 1977 (aged 86)
- Education: University of Edinburgh
- Known for: Dukes classification
- Medical career
- Profession: Pathologist
- Field: Pathology, Urology
- Institutions: University College London

Cuthbert Esquire Dukes OBE (24 July 1890 – 3 February 1977) was an English physician, pathologist and author, for whom the Dukes classification for colorectal cancer is named.

== Career ==
Dukes was educated at Caterham School. He graduated with an M.D. thesis entitled Effect of severe haemorrhage and shock on the condition of the blood from the University of Edinburgh in 1914. His field of choice was pathology. He served in the Royal Army Medical Corps that was attached to the Rifle Brigade (The Prince Consort's Own) during World War I and was awarded the OBE for his services. After the war's end he became a demonstrator in bacteriology at University College in London, and in 1922, was the first pathologist to join the staff of St Mark's Hospital. It was there that he began his recognized studies on the pathology of colon cancer. He wrote several books based on his findings.

In 1924 he started the Polyposis Registry with John Lockhart-Mummery which kept data on people with inherited multiple polyps.

Dukes, who was a Quaker, declined honours offered to him and lived in Wimbledon until his death at the age of 86.

He was the younger brother of British playwright Ashley Dukes and MI6 agent Sir Paul Dukes. He was also the great-uncle of poet Aidan Andrew Dun.

== Selected publications ==
=== Books ===
- Dukes, Cuthbert (1924) Joseph Lister (1827-1912), London : Leonard Parsons.

=== Articles ===
- Dukes, Cuthbert (1935) "In the boyhood of the race" Friends' quarterly examiner; Vol.69; no.274 (Fourth Month 1935), pp. 117–126
- Dukes, Cuthbert (1937) "What does Quakerism mean to me? Friends' quarterly examiner; Vol.71; no.282 (Fourth Month 1937), p. 131-134

== See also ==
- Pathology
- List of pathologists
