= Swinford Edwards =

British surgeon (1853–1939)

Swinford Edwards (1853–1939) was a British surgeon to St Peter's Hospital for Stone and St Mark's Hospital, London, who specialised in surgery of the genito-urinary tract, colon and rectum. He was an early user of the technique of injecting piles. He retired in 1913, and was succeeded by John Percy Lockhart-Mummery.
