= Alan Farthing =

English obstetrician and gynaecologist (born 1963)

- Born: Winchester, Hampshire, England
- Education: Beacon School; St George's Hospital Medical School
- Occupation: Gynaecologist
- Medical career
- Institutions: St Mary's Hospital; Imperial College, London; Queen Charlotte's Hospital; King Edward VII's Hospital

Alan John Farthing CVO FRCOG (born 1963) is a British gynaecologist, head of the department for gynaecological cancer at Imperial College, and on the list of honorary staff at the King Edward VII's Hospital. He served as Surgeon-Gynaecologist to Queen Elizabeth II's Royal Household.

== Career ==
Alan Farthing was born in Winchester, Hampshire. He attended Beacon School in Crowborough, East Sussex, where his father was headmaster. After training at St George's Hospital Medical School, London, Farthing qualified as a doctor in 1986. He became a member of the Royal College of Obstetricians and Gynaecologists in 1991, and a Fellow in 2003.

Farthing was appointed as a consultant gynaecologist at St Mary's Hospital in 1997, where he also became an honorary Senior Lecturer at Imperial College, London. He is a specialist in gynaecological cancer care, and an internationally recognised expert in the use of laparoscopic and hysteroscopic surgery.

Farthing has a private Harley Street practice, and works as a consultant at two teaching hospitals in London: Queen Charlotte's Hospital in Shepherd's Bush, and St Mary's Hospital in Paddington.

== Surgeon-Gynaecologist to the Royal Household ==
In 2008, Farthing was appointed to assist Marcus Setchell, who was retiring from the NHS, as the Queen's Surgeon-Gynaecologist.

He was appointed Commander of the Royal Victorian Order (CVO) in the 2023 Birthday Honours for services to the Royal Household.

== Personal life ==
Farthing was separated from his first wife when he met BBC TV presenter Jill Dando. After Farthing's divorce in late 1998, the couple announced their engagement on 31 January 1999 and were due to marry in September 1999.

On 26 April 1999, Dando was murdered on the doorstep of her house in Gowan Avenue, Fulham. Farthing rarely speaks about Dando's murder, with his last major interview given to the Daily Mail in June 1999. In the interview, Farthing said that Dando had made him breakfast at his then home in Chiswick, West London before he left for work. Dando then went shopping before returning to her home in Gowan Avenue, where she was shot and killed. Farthing described how a week after Dando's murder, he found a reporters' notebook containing a draft of the speech she had intended to give on their wedding day. Dando's co-presenter on Crimewatch, Nick Ross, proposed the formation of an academic institute in her name and together with Farthing raised almost £1.5 million (equivalent to £2.9 million in 2025). The Jill Dando Institute of Crime Science was founded at University College London on 26 April 2001, the second anniversary of her murder. In 2008, Farthing married for a second time and in 2010, the couple welcomed a son.

== Selected publications ==
- Kyrgiou, M.; Horwell, D. H.; Farthing, A. (July 2015). "Laparoscopic radical abdominal trachelectomy for the management of stage IB1 cervical cancer at 14 weeks' gestation: case report and review of the literature". BJOG: An International Journal of Obstetrics and Gynaecology. 122 (8): 1138–1143. doi:10.1111/1471-0528.13392. ISSN 1471-0528. PMID 25832461.
- Hall, Marcia; Savvatis, Konstantinos; Nixon, Katherine; Kyrgiou, Maria; Hariharan, Kuhan; Padwick, Malcolm; Owens, Owen; Cunnea, Paula; Campbell, Jeremy; Farthing, Alan; Stumpfle, Richard; Vazquez, Ignacio; Watson, Neale; Krell, Jonathan; Gabra, Hani; Rustin, Gordon; Fotopoulou, Christina (September 2019). "Maximal-Effort Cytoreductive Surgery for Ovarian Cancer Patients with a High Tumor Burden: Variations in Practice and Impact on Outcome". Annals of Surgical Oncology. 26 (9): 2943–2951. doi:10.1245/s10434-019-07516-3. ISSN 1534-4681. PMC 6682567. PMID 31243666.

== See also ==
- List of honorary medical staff at King Edward VII's Hospital for Officers
