= John Howard Mummery =

British dentist and dental surgeon

John Howard Mummery, CBE, FRCS (19 January 1847 – 30 August 1926) was a British dentist and microscopist.

== Early life and education ==
John Mummery was born on 19 January 1847, the son of John Rigden Mummery, a dentist.

He qualified MRCS (Eng) in 1870 and as a dentist in 1873.

He joined his father in practice at Cavendish Place in London and became one of the best known dental surgeons of his day, becoming President of the British Dental Association in 1899 and of the F.D.I. in 1914.

In 1907, after having been the president of the Odontology Society of Great Britain, he was elected president of the new Odontology Section of the then newly formed Royal Society of Medicine.

During the First World War, he was appointed Registrar and Superintendent of the Maxillo-facial Hospital at Kennington.

== Family ==
Mummery married Mary Lily Lockhart, the daughter of William Lockhart (1811–1897), famed medical missionary and fellow of the Royal College of Surgeons (UK). She died from acute pneumonia on 24 May 1897 at the age of 48 at Whitby. His son John Lockhart-Mummery, and grandson Sir Hugh Evelyn Lockhart-Mummery, were both surgeons.

== Writings ==
Mummery wrote at least two texts, Microanatomy of the Teeth (Henry Frowde, Oxford University Press: 1919) and Microscopic and General Anatomy of the Teeth: Human and Comparative. He lived at 79 Albert Bridge Road, Wandsworth, London at the time the first text was published.

== Death and legacy ==
Mummery died on 30 August 1926, whilst on a visit to Cornwall. The British Dental Association presents a Howard Mummery Prize for dental research, which was first awarded to J H Scott in 1963.
