= Crime science =

Study of ways to prevent or reduce crime

Crime science is the study of crime in order to find ways to prevent it. It is distinguished from criminology in that it is focused on how crime is committed and how to reduce it, rather than on who committed it. It is multidisciplinary, recruiting scientific methodology rather than relying on social theory.

== Definition ==
Crime science involves the application of scientific methodologies to prevent or reduce social disorder and find better ways to prevent, detect, and solve crimes. Crime science studies crime related events and how those events arise, or can be prevented, by attempting to understand the temptations and opportunities which provoke or allow offending, and which affect someone's choice to offend on a particular occasion, rather than assuming the problem is simply about bad people versus good people. It is an empirical approach often involving observational studies or quasi-experiments, as well as using randomised controlled trials, that seek to identify patterns of offending behaviour and factors that influence criminal offending behaviour and crime. The multi-disciplinary approach that involves practitioners from many fields including Policing, Geography, Urban Development, Mathematics, Statistics, Industrial Design, Construction Engineering, Physical Sciences, Medical Sciences, Economics, Computer Science, Psychology, Sociology, Criminology, Forensics, Law, and Public Management.

== History ==
Crime science was conceived by the British broadcaster Nick Ross in the late 1990s (with encouragement from the then Commissioner of the Metropolitan Police, Sir John Stevens and Professor Ken Pease) out of concern that traditional criminology and orthodox political discourse were doing little to influence the ebb and flow of crime (e.g. Ross: Police Foundation Lecture, London, 11 July 2000 (jointly with Sir John Stevens); Parliamentary and Scientific Committee, 22 March 2001; Barlow Lecture, UCL, 6 April 2005). Ross described crime science as, "examining the chain of events that leads to crime in order to cut the weakest link" (Royal Institution Lecture 9 May 2002).

== Jill Dando Institute of Crime Science ==
The first incarnation of crime science was the founding, also by Ross, of the Jill Dando Institute of Crime Science (JDI) at University College London in 2001. In order to reflect its broad disciplinary base, and its departure from the sociological (and often politicised) brand of criminology, the Institute is established in the Engineering Sciences Faculty, with growing ties to the physical sciences such as physics and chemistry but also drawing on the fields of statistics, environmental design, psychology, forensics, policing, economics and geography.

The JDI grew rapidly and spawned a new Department of Security and Crime Science, which itself developed into one of the largest departments of its type in the world. It has established itself as a world-leader in crime mapping and for training crime analysts (civilian crime profilers who work for the police) and its Centre for the Forensic Sciences has been influential in debunking bad science in criminal detection. It established the world's first secure data lab for security and crime pattern analysis and appointed the world's first Professor of Future Crime whose role is to horizon-scan to foresee and forestall tomorrow's crime challenges. The JDI also developed a Security Science Doctoral Research Training Centre (UCL SECReT), which was Europe’s largest centre for doctoral training in security and crime science.

== Design Against Crime Research Centre ==
Another branch of crime science has grown from its combination with design science. At the Central Saint Martins College of Arts and Design a research centre was founded with the focus of studying how design could be used as a tool against crime - the Design against Crime Research Centre. A number of practical theft-aware design practices have emerged there. Examples are chairs with a hanger that allows people to keep their bags within their reach for the whole time, or foldable bicycles that can serve as their own safety lock by wrapping around static poles in the environment.

== International Crime Science Network ==
An international Crime Science Network was formed in 2003, with support from the EPSRC. Since then the term crime science has been variously interpreted, sometimes with a different emphasis from Ross's original description published in 1999, and often favouring situational crime prevention (redesigning products, services and policies to remove opportunities, temptations and provocations and make detection more certain) rather than other forms of intervention. However a common feature is a focus on delivering immediate reductions in crime.

== Growth of the Crime Science Field ==
The concept of crime science appears to be taking root more broadly with:

- The establishment of crime science departments at the University of Waikato in New Zealand, and University of Cincinnati in the US.
- Crime Science courses at several institutions including Northumbria University in the UK and Temple University, Philadelphia in the US.
- An annual Crime Science Network gathering in London which draws police and academics from across the world.
- A Springer Open Access Interdisciplinary journal devoted to Crime Science.Crime science increasingly being cited in criminology text books and journals papers (sometimes claimed as a new branch of criminology, and sometimes reviled as anti-criminology).
- A move in traditional criminology towards the aims originally set out by Ross in his concern for a more evidence-based, scientific approach to crime reduction.
- Crime science featuring in several learned journals in other disciplines (such as a special issue of the European Journal of Applied Mathematics devoted to "crime modelling").

== Applications and Practices ==
Crime science is closely associated with evidence-based policing. This uses data that is backed up by scientific evaluation and experimental methods to guide crime reduction strategies. Research highlights the importance of collaboration between academics and law enforcement practitioners. The specific experts included are considered to be criminologists, crime analysts, and police practitioners, these design and evaluate crime prevention programs.

Situation crime prevention is a key application, and the main focus of this practice is reducing opportunities for crime by altering immediate environments. Increasing the effort required to commit crimes and increasing the risks of detection are the main approaches to this application. Followed by reducing the rewards of offending and removing the provocations or excuses for criminal behavior. Examples of situation prevention carried out in the real world include excess street lighting, survelience systems, secure product design, and environmental modifications to reduce opportunities for theft or violence.

Another defining feature of crime science is its focus on the evaluation process. Interventions are systematically assessed using empirical methods to determine their effectiveness. From these findings, different strategies are either refined or discontinued as needed.

== See also ==
- Broken windows theory
- Parable of the broken window
- Crime prevention through environmental design
- Crime statistics
- Crime scene investigation
- Forensic science
- Evidence-based policing
- Intelligence-led policing
- Jill Dando
- Jill Dando Institute
- Community policing
- Peelian principles and Policing by consent
- Police science
- Predictive policing
- Preventive police
- Proactive policing
- Problem-oriented policing
- Recidivism

== Bibliography ==
- Junger, Marianne; Laycock, Gloria; Hartel, Pieter; Ratcliffe, Jerry (11 June 2012). "Crime science: editorial statement". Crime Science. 1 (1) 1: 1.1 – 1.3. doi:10.1186/2193-7680-1-1. ISSN 2193-7680.
- Clarke, Ronald V. (31 March 2011). "Crime Science". In McLaughlin, Eugene; Newburn, Tim (eds.). The SAGE Handbook of Criminological Theory (Print, Online). SAGE Publications Ltd. pp. 271–283. doi:10.4135/9781446200926.n15. ISBN 978-1-4129-2038-4.
- Hartel, Pieter H.; Junger, Marianne; Wieringa, Roelf J. (October 2010). "Cyber-crime Science = Crime Science + Information Security". CTIT Technical Report Series (Technical Report TR-CTIT-10-34). Enschede.: Centre for Telematics and Information Technology (CTIT), University of Twente. ISSN 1381-3625.
- Pease, Ken (22 February 2010). "Crime science". In Shoham, Shlomo Giora; Knepper, Paul; Kett, Martin (eds.). International Handbook of Criminology (1 ed.). Boca Raton: Routledge. pp. 3–23. doi:10.1201/9781420085525. ISBN 978-0-429-25000-2.
- Guerette, Rob T.; Bowers, Kate J. (November 2009). "Assessing the Extent of Crime Displacement and Diffusion of Benefits: A Review of Situational Crime Prevention Evaluations*". Criminology. 47 (4): 1331–1368. doi:10.1111/j.1745-9125.2009.00177.x. ISSN 1745-9125.
- Willison, Robert; Siponen, Mikko (1 September 2009). "Overcoming the insider: reducing employee computer crime through Situational Crime Prevention". Communications of the ACM. 52 (9): 133–137. doi:10.1145/1562164.1562198. hdl:10398/6456. ISSN 0001-0782. S2CID 2987733.
- Cox, Karen (1 July 2008). "The application of crime science to the prevention of medication errors". British Journal of Nursing. 17 (14): 924–927. doi:10.12968/bjon.2008.17.14.30662. ISSN 0966-0461. PMID 18935846.
- Tilley, Nick; Laycock, Gloria (2007). "From Crime Prevention to Crime Science". In Farrell, Graham; Bowers, Kate J.; Johnson, Shane D.; Townsley, Mike (eds.). Imagination for crime prevention : essays in honour of Ken Pease (Hardcover, Paperback). Monsey, New York: Criminal Justice Press. ISBN 978-1-881798-71-2.
- Laycock, Gloria (2005). "Chapter 1: Defining Crime Science.". In Smith, Melissa J.; Tilley, Nick (eds.). Crime science: new approaches to preventing and detecting crime. Crime Science Series (1 ed.). Uffculme, UK: Willan Publishing. pp. 3–24. ISBN 1-843-92090-5.
- Clarke, Ronald V. (1997). "Part One: Introduction". In Clarke, Ronald V. (ed.). Situational Crime Prevention Successful Case Studies (PDF) (2 ed.). Guilderland, New York: Harrow and Heston. ISBN 0-911577-38-6. Archived from the original (PDF) on 26 June 2010.
