= Harvey Kearsley =

British Army general and courtier (1880–1956)

Brigadier-General Sir Harvey Kearsley KCVO CMG DSO
- Born: 28 March 1880
- Died: 9 May 1956 (aged 76)
- Military career
- Allegiance: United Kingdom
- Branch: British Army
- Service years: 1899–1922
- Rank: Brigadier-General
- Conflicts: Second Boer War; First World War
- Awards: Knight Commander of the Royal Victorian Order; Companion of the Order of St Michael and St George; Distinguished Service Order; Mentioned in Dispatches

Brigadier-General Sir Robert Harvey Kearsley KCVO CMG DSO (28 March 1880 – 9 May 1956) was a senior British Army officer and courtier in the Household of Elizabeth II.

He was the son of Major Robert Wilson Kearsley, and educated at Harrow School and the Royal Military College, Sandhurst.

Kearsley commissioned into the 5th Dragoon Guards as a second lieutenant on 11 February 1899. He first saw active service in the Second Boer War, where he served on the Staff during operations in Natal in late 1899, then took part in the defence of Ladysmith and served in the Transvaal. Promoted to lieutenant on 27 June 1900, he was with the South African Constabulary from 1900 to 1903. He returned to the United Kingdom on the SS Kinfauns Castle in March 1903, together with Major-General Baden-Powell. After promotion to captain, he was adjutant of his regiment from 1906 and 1909, and he graduated from the Staff College, Camberley in 1913.

In 1914 he was deployed to France with the British Expeditionary Force following the outbreak of the First World War. He was awarded the Distinguished Service Order in 1915, and served as staff officer in the Indian Cavalry Corps and the 1st Canadian Division. On 5 August 1917 he was appointed Brigadier-General, General Staff (BGGS) of the VI Corps. During the war his services were mentioned in dispatches seven times, and Kearsley was made Companion of the Order of St Michael and St George in 1918.

In 1922 Kearsley retired from the regular army and joined the Honourable Corps of Gentlemen at Arms. From 1935 to 1945 he was Clerk of the Cheque and Adjutant, and he published a history of the Corps in 1937. In 1939 he was made Commander of the Royal Victorian Order. In 1945 he became Lieutenant of the Corps, and served in the position for ten years. In 1952 he was knighted as a Knight Commander of the Royal Victorian Order. Kearsley was appointed as an Extra Equerry to Elizabeth II in March 1955 following his retirement from the Corps.

He married Evelyn Molly Peto, daughter of Samuel Arthur Peto and Ellen Cornelia Harding, on 23 January 1908. Together they had one daughter, Ursula.
