= George Pinker =

Indian obstetrician and gynecologist (1924–2007)

Sir George Douglas Pinker, KCVO (6 December 1924 – 29 April 2007) was an internationally respected obstetrician and gynecologist, best known for modernizing the delivery of royal babies.

== Early life ==
George Douglas Pinker was born on 6 December 1924 in Calcutta, India, the second son of Queenie Elizabeth née Dix and Ronald Douglas Pinker, a horticulturist who worked for Suttons Seeds for 40 years, and headed the bulb and flower department for 25 years. At the time of George's birth, he ran Sutton Seeds Indian Branch in Calcutta. His older brother Kenneth Hubert was born in Reading on 15 September 1919.

== Education ==
From 1928 aged four, Pinker was educated at Reading School. In 1942, he began medical training at St Mary's Hospital Medical School, Paddington, London, qualifying as a doctor in 1947. As a student in 1946, when the Music Society put on its first post-war production The Mikado, he sang one of the leading roles. He turned down a contract with the D'Oyly Carte Opera Company to pursue a career in medicine. Queen Elizabeth attended the performance as patron of both the hospital and the medical school, accompanied by the two young princesses, Elizabeth and Margaret.

== Professional career ==
Deciding to specialize in obstetrics, he served his National Service as a lieutenant in the Royal Army Medical Corps in Singapore, where he did much of his specialist training under Benjamin Henry Sheares at the British Military Hospital, Singapore. Returning to civilian life at the Radcliffe Infirmary in Oxford, in 1958 he was appointed a consultant in obstetrics and gynaecology to St. Mary's Hospital and Samaritan Hospital for Women, both of which he served for the next 31 years. While at St Mary's Hospital on May 27, 1971, he assisted in the first ever Caesarian section birth under an Epidural anaesthetic. He later also held the position of Consulting Gynaecological Surgeon to the Middlesex Hospital; Soho Hospital for Women; Bolingbroke Hospital, Battersea; and the Radcliffe Infirmary from 1969 to 1980.

Pinker accepted an increasing involvement with the Royal College of Obstetricians and Gynaecologists, serving as Honorary Treasurer, 1970–77. He was a past president of the British Fertility Society and supported the research that led to the birth in 1978 of Louise Brown, the first test-tube baby.

His work at the Royal College earned him international respect amongst obstetricians and gynaecologists. In 1980 he was elected vice-president and finally President in 1987.

He was President of the Royal Society of Medicine from 1992 to 1994.

== Wellbeing of Women ==
In 1964 he and several distinguished colleagues founded the Childbirth Research Centre. Changing its name to Birthright in 1972, it is now Wellbeing of Women. Diana, Princess of Wales, whose two sons had been delivered by Pinker, became a patron in 1984.

On 12 October 2011, the Right Reverend Vincent Nichols gave the first annual Sir George Pinker Memorial Address.

== Surgeon and gynaecologist to the Queen ==
In 1973 he succeeded Sir John Peel as surgeon gynaecologist to Queen Elizabeth II. The youngest person to be appointed to the post, he delivered nine royal babies: the Earl of Ulster, Lady Davina Windsor, and Lady Rose Gilman; Lord Frederick Windsor and Lady Gabriella Kingston; Peter Phillips and Zara Tindall; Prince William, and Prince Harry. All of these births took place at St. Mary's Hospital, Paddington, a significant break with royal tradition as all prior royal births had taken place at a royal residence. In 1990, he was replaced by Marcus Setchell CVO.

== Honours ==
Pinker was appointed a CVO in 1983, and a KCVO in 1990. In the same year, he authored the book 'Preparing for Pregnancy'. In 1991 he edited 'Clinical Gynecological Oncology'. He also contributed to several books: Diseases of Women by Ten Teachers (1964), Obstetrics by Ten Teachers (1964), A Short Textbook of Obstetrics and Gynaecology (1967).

== Personal life ==
Pinker married former nurse Dorothy Emma Russell in London on 31 March 1951. The couple had four children: twins Catherine and Ian, Robert, and William. His wife died in 2003.

Pinker enjoyed all music, but particularly opera. He became assistant concert director of Reading Symphony Orchestra, and then in 1988 vice-president of the London Choral Society. He was a keen skier, sailor, gardener and hill-walker.

== Death and memorial service ==
In his last years, he was disabled by Parkinson's disease and partial blindness. Pinker died in Cheltenham, Gloucestershire on 29 April 2007.

A Memorial Service was held in October 2007 St Marylebone Church, London, attended by the Duchess of Gloucester and Queen Anne-Marie of Greece. In August 2008 it was reported that he left nearly £1.5million in his will to his four children.
