= Lesley Regan =

British gynaecologist (born 1956)

Dame Lesley Regan DBE
- Born: 8 March 1956 (age 70); London
- Medical career
- Profession: Gynaecologist
- Institutions: Imperial College Healthcare NHS Trust
- Website: https://www.imperial.ac.uk/people/l.regan

Dame Lesley Regan DBE (born 8 March 1956) is a British gynaecologist, professor of Obstetrics and Gynaecology at Imperial College London and Honorary Consultant at Imperial College Healthcare NHS Trust at St Mary's Hospital. She was the president of the Royal College of Obstetricians and Gynaecologists from 2016 to 2019 – at the time she was only the second woman to ever hold this role and the first in sixty-four years.

In 2020, she became the chair of Wellbeing of Women. In 2022, Dame Lesley was appointed as the Government's first ever Women's Health Ambassador for England.

Professor Regan is the first woman to hold a chair on obstetrics and gynaecology in the country and for the past decades she has worked to establish the biggest miscarriage clinic in the world.

== Education and training ==
Lesley Regan graduated from the Royal Free Hospital, London in 1980, before becoming a registrar in obstetrics and gynaecology at Addenbrooke's Hospital, Cambridge. She was awarded an MD thesis after a secondment to the Medical Research Council's Embryo and Gamete Research Group. While at Addenbrooke's Regan was also a teaching fellow and Director of Studies in Medicine at Girton College, Cambridge.

== Career ==
After receiving her MD Regan moved from Cambridge to London to become a consultant and senior lecturer in obstetrics and gynaecology at St Mary's Hospital, where she is now chair. She was one of the first women to hold a chair in obstetrics and gynaecology in the UK, the first being Margaret Fairlie (1891–1963) who was appointed Professor of Obstetrics & Gynaecology at the University of Dundee in 1940.

Regan was elected the president of the Royal College of Obstetricians and Gynaecologists in 2016, the second woman and the first in 64 years to hold this position. In her first presidential address, she discussed the importance of a healthy lifestyle for a safe pregnancy, and the risks of obesity.

She is also co-director of the UK's Baby Bio Bank (BBB), a pregnancy tissue archive which aims to underpin future translational research into the major complications of pregnancy. The Baby Bio Bank was established on 1 November 2013, by two London Universities, University College London and Imperial College London, with funding by Wellbeing of Women. They collect samples from the three key members of the family: the mother, father and baby, allowing hereditary factors from both parents to be tracked. They require a sample of blood from the mother and father and a piece of term placenta which is routinely discarded.

In June 2022, Professor Regan was appointed as the first Women's Health Ambassador for England to drive the implementation of England's first ever Women's health strategy. This appointment was subsequently renewed to December 2025

In March 2007, Regan featured in the BBC's Prof Regan's Beauty Parlour.

== Publications ==
Regan has written several books on pregnancy and miscarriage including Your Pregnancy Week by Week. Her book, Miscarriage: What Every Woman Needs to Know written in 2018, explores how one in four pregnancies ends in miscarriage.

As RCOG President, Professor Regan published The Better for Women report, making a series of recommendations on how to improve the health of women and girls in the UK, launched in The House of Commons.

== Honours ==
Regan was appointed Dame Commander of the Order of the British Empire (DBE) in the 2020 New Year Honours for services to women's healthcare.

In 2021, Regan was awarded 2021 Inspiration of the Year Hello Magazine Award, presented by Natasha Kaplinsky.

Her collaborative approach to women's health has resulted in her receiving Honorary Fellowships of seven UK specialties and several international Colleges of Obstetrics & Gynaecology.

== Personal and family ==
Regan lives in London, and is the mother of twin girls born in 1992 from her marriage to Professor John Summerfield, a liver specialist at St Mary's, in 1990, and so became a step-mother to two step-sons and two step-daughters

== See also ==
- List of honorary medical staff at King Edward VII's Hospital for Officers
