= UCL Jill Dando Institute =

Coordinates: 51.524853°N 0.129594°W

UCL Jill Dando Institute of Security and Crime Science
- Established: 2001
- Director: Richard Wortley
- Location: London, United Kingdom
- Website: UCL Jill Dando Institute of Security and Crime Science

The UCL Jill Dando Institute of Security and Crime Science (informally the Jill Dando Institute or the JDI) is an institute of crime science located in London, United Kingdom, and a part of University College London (UCL). It was founded in 2001, becoming the first university institute in the world devoted specifically to crime science. The institute's current director is Richard Wortley.

== History ==
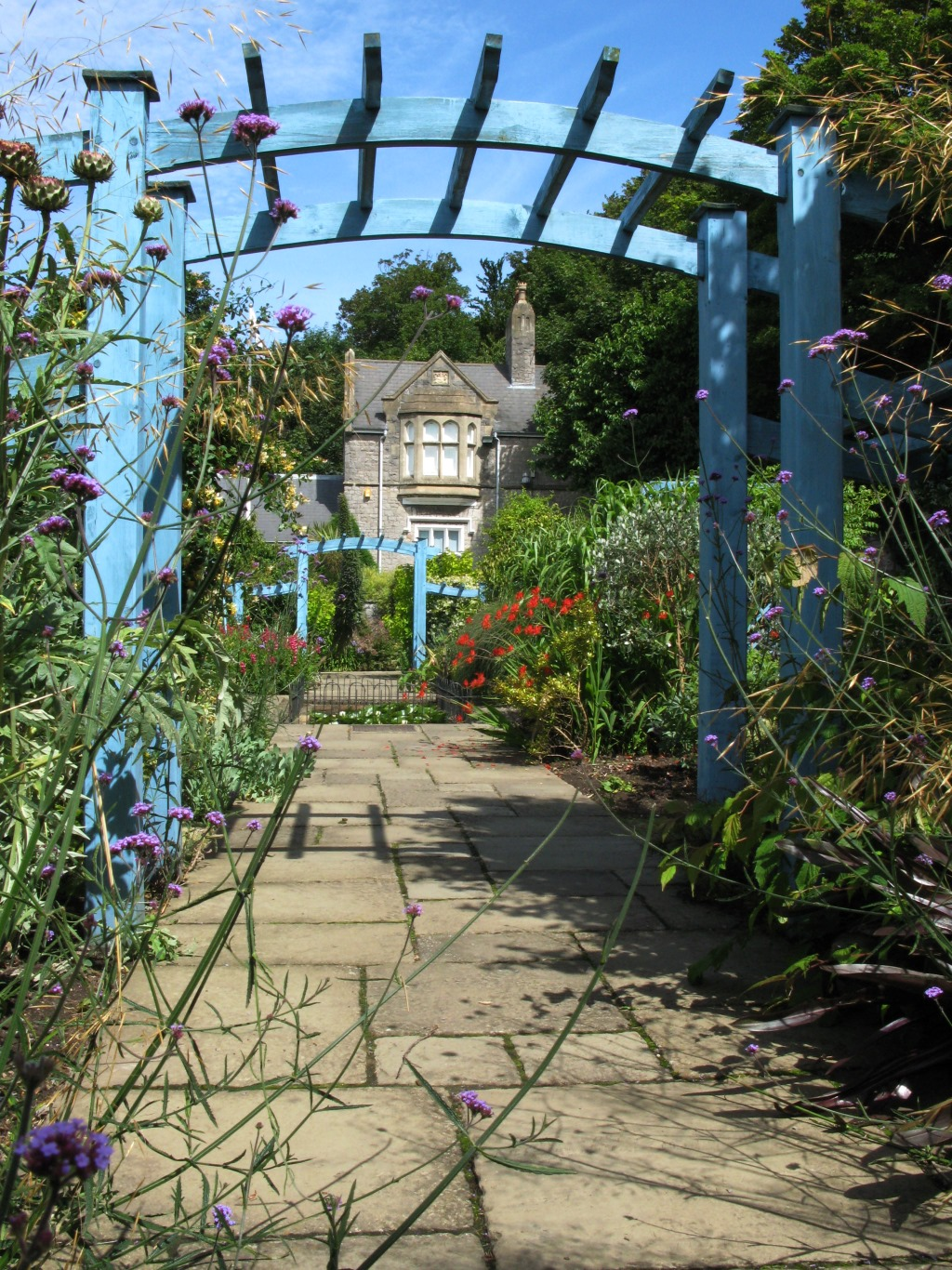
The Jill Dando memorial garden in Weston-super-Mare

In April 1999 the broadcaster Jill Dando was murdered outside her home in west London. Her colleague and co-presenter of the BBC One programme Crimewatch, Nick Ross proposed a memorial to her in the form of a new university institution in her name, for which he was awarded an CBE in 2021. Ross had already conceived of crime science as a new discipline which distinguished itself from criminology by focusing on crime prevention, scientific methodology and multidisciplinary approach. He and Dando's fiancé, Alan Farthing, established the Jill Dando Fund with the help of the Metropolitan Police Commissioner Sir John Stevens, the Countess of Wessex, and her family and friends.

On 15 March 2000 the Jill Dando Fund was launched in London at Claridge's hotel, followed by the launch of the Jill Dando Fund Appeal on 12 September 2000. The appeal raised £1.5 million and UCL was selected to host the Jill Dando Institute of Crime Science. Gloria Laycock, OBE was appointed as the first director of the institute in January 2001. The institute was opened on 26 April 2001, the second anniversary of Jill Dando's murder.

=== Scholarship ===
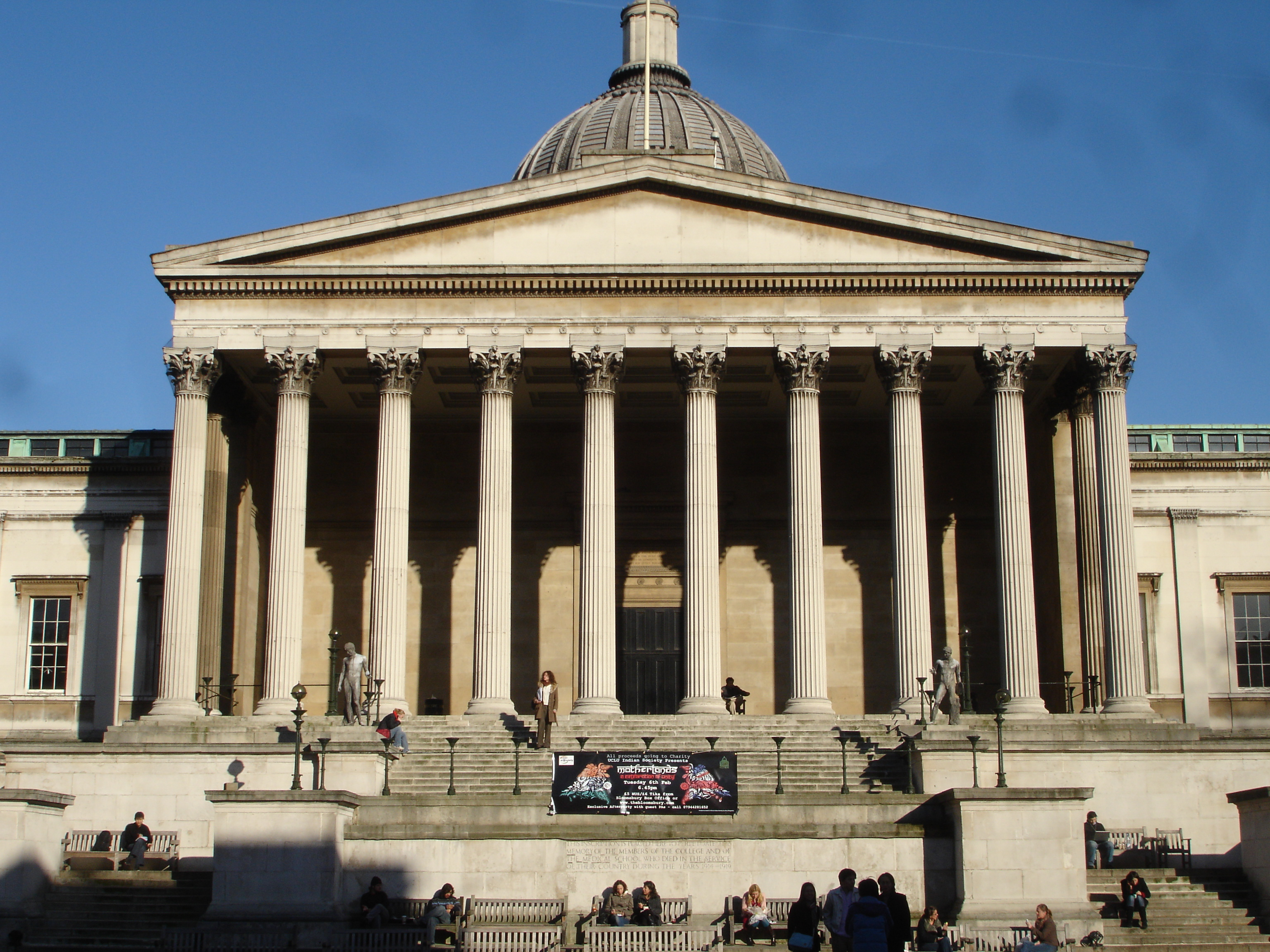
The main portico of University College London

In May 2004 the institute established new scholarships for its MSc in crime science. In 2005 a Security and Crime Science Centre was established at the institute to work with industry partners in creating new approaches to counter terrorism. In the same year the International Crime Science Network was established. The institute published research in May 2006 which showed that the UK and France are perceived to have the worst problems with anti-social behaviour in Europe. The Centre for Security and Crime Science opened in October 2006.

In 2009 UCL established the Department of Security and Crime Science as a separate entity from the institute in order to enable the offering of post-graduate taught and research courses in security and crime science. The institute continued as a cross-departmental research institute in security and crime science. In September 2009 the Home Office was criticised after it drew up timescales for how long DNA samples should be retained based on research by the institute that had not yet been finished.

== See also ==
- Crime scene investigation
- Crime prevention through environmental design
- Crime statistics
