= Marcus Setchell =

British gynaecologist

Sir Marcus Edward Setchell, KCVO FRCS FRCOG (born 4 October 1943) is a British obstetrician and gynaecologist and the former Surgeon-Gynaecologist to Queen Elizabeth II's Royal Household.

== Career ==
Marcus Setchell was educated at Felsted School in Essex. After training at Gonville and Caius College, Cambridge and St Bartholomew's Hospital, London, he specialised in obstetrics and gynaecology.

In 1975, he became the consultant gynaecologist and obstetrician at St Bartholomew's Hospital, and also at Homerton Hospital following its opening in 1986, holding both positions until 2000. He was a consultant at: Whittington Hospital (2000–2008); King Edward VII Hospital for Officers; director of the Fertility Unit at the Portland Hospital (1987–94): med director of the Homerton Hospital (1994–1997); a consultant at The London Clinic (1975-2014). His last position before retirement from the National Health Service (NHS) in 2008 was as consultant obstetrician and gynaecologist at the Whittington Hospital, London.

Setchell was a council member of the Royal College of Obstetricians and Gynaecologists from 1994 to 2000. A council Member of King Edward VII Hospital, and a trustee of the charity Wellbeing of Women, he was made Commander of the Royal Victorian Order in 2005.

== Surgeon-Gynaecologist to the Royal Household ==
Having replaced Sir George Pinker in 1990, Setchell served as Surgeon-Gynaecologist to Queen Elizabeth II. Setchell delivered Lady Louise Mountbatten-Windsor at Frimley Park Hospital, the first royal child to be delivered at an NHS hospital, and Viscount Severn. He also cared for their mother, the Countess of Wessex, after her ectopic pregnancy in 2001 and assisted with the Duchess of Cornwall's hysterectomy. In December 2012, he attended Catherine, Duchess of Cambridge, in her pregnancy. He delivered her son, Prince George of Cambridge, in July 2013 at the Lindo Wing of St. Mary's Hospital in Paddington.

In 2008 Alan Farthing was appointed to assist and to succeed Setchell as the Queen's Surgeon-Gynaecologist, a position the latter retired from at the end of 2013. Setchell was appointed Knight Commander of the Royal Victorian Order (KCVO) in the 2014 New Year Honours.

== Publications ==
- Progress in Obstetrics and Gynaecology (1987)
- Scientific Foundations of Obstetrics and Gynaecology (ed, 1991)
- Reconstructive Urology (1993)
- Ten Teachers Gynaecology (1995)
- Ten Teachers Obstetrics (1995)
- MCQ's in Obstetrics and Gynaecology (1996)
- Shaw's Textbook of Operative Gynaecology (2001)
- Self-Assessment in Gynaecology and Obstetrics (2001)
- General Surgical Operations (2006)
