= Wellbeing of Women =

British women's health charity

- Founded: October 1964
- Founder: Will Nixon
- Type: Health charity
- Registration no.: 239281 (England and Wales); SC042856 (Scotland)
- Purpose: Reproductive health
- Location: London
- Key people: CEO: Janet Lindsay; Joint Honorary President: Sir Marcus Setchell; Joint Honorary President: Sir Victor Blank; Chair Professor Dame Lesley Regan; Chair of the Research Advisory Committee: Professor David Williams
- Revenue: £1,898,078
- Employees: 13
- Volunteers: 250
- Website: https://www.wellbeingofwomen.org.uk/
- Formerly called: Childbirth Research Centre; Birthright; Wellbeing

Wellbeing of Women is a UK charity dedicated to funding research, education and advocacy across all of women's reproductive and gynaecological health, including menstruation, fertility, pregnancy, childbirth, gynaecological cancers, menopause and incontinence. It raises money to invest in medical research and the development of specialist doctors and nurses working in these fields. The charity also disseminates information and hosts regular webinars on women's health.

The charity is based in London, and consists of: a team of staff and volunteers; a board of trustees headed up by Professor Dame Lesley Regan, and a Research Advisory Committee of leading experts.

The Duchess of Edinburgh became the charity's patron in 2021.

Ambassadors include Baroness Karren Brady of Knightsbridge, Carol Vorderman, Fiona Bruce, and Kate Silverton.

== History ==
=== 1960s ===
The charity was established in 1964 by eminent obstetrician Professor Will Nixon, who was touched by the grief of a young man whose wife died during childbirth. It was originally called The Childbirth Research Centre. He gathered a group of illustrious founder members including Lord Brain, a neurologist who cared for Winston Churchill on his deathbed in 1965; Sir John Peel, the surgeon-gynaecologist to the Queen; Professor Dugald Baird and Sir George Pinker, an obstetrician who delivered nine royal babies including Princes William and Harry. The founders' aim was to reduce the number of women and babies who died during pregnancy and childbirth.

An early donation established that a deficiency in folic acid was a factor in malformed babies. Pregnant women across the world now take folic acid supplements.

The charity also funded crucial research into epidurals which means that millions of women now benefit from a relatively pain-free birth.

=== 1970s ===
In 1972 the charity was renamed Birthright.

Research projects they funded created the ground rules that mean many thousands of women have safe laser treatment to treat cervical cancer. They also enabled breakthroughs into monitoring babies in the womb. One early pieces of research into the diagnosis of Down's Syndrome in pregnant women helped make the amniocentesis test more accurate. The charity also discovered a link between smoking and pre-eclampsia and babies being born underweight.

=== 1980s ===
Diana, Princess of Wales, became the patron of Birthright in 1984.

She was devoted to the charity, explaining: "To long for a baby and not to be able to have one must be devastating. I don't know how I would cope with that. And if my work for Birthright can alleviate that suffering for just one couple, it will have been all worthwhile."

During her time as patron, the charity funded work into IVF and also investigated HPV, the virus that causes cervical cancer leading to the cervical cancer screening programme. The charity's research into recurrent miscarriage also meant that, out of a research group of 2000 women who had been told they would never have children, 79% went on to have babies. Professor Stuart Campbell of King's College, London, received funding from the charity for a project that developed an ultrasound that would identify babies at risk of stillbirth by finding out if they had abnormal blood flow.

=== 1990s ===
In November 1993, the charity was rebranded as 'Wellbeing'. During the 1990s, the charity funded research which discovered that ultrasound could be used to detect abnormalities in early pregnancy. This resulted in pre-natal screening for Down's Syndrome. The charity enabled breakthroughs in IVF, by funding research into the optimum time for embryo transfer, and by looking at how eggs mature in the ovary. This was described at the time as 'the biggest advance in fertility treatment'. They also funded research into gynaecological cancers; contraception; and the bone density of post-menopausal women.

=== 2000s ===
The charity was renamed 'Wellbeing of Women', in 2004.

Wellbeing of Women partnered with 100 Women in Hedge Funds to fund a project which advanced our understanding of the genetics of Cerebral Palsy. The charity also funded research that helped reverse brain damage in newborn babies and a project that helped women suffering from recurrent miscarriage go on to have a successful pregnancy, by identifying 'Natural Killer cells' in the mother's immune system.

In 2007, then British Prime Minister's wife Sarah Brown became patron of Wellbeing of Women.

In 2008, Wellbeing of Women was announced as one of the beneficiary charities of the Lord Mayor's Appeal, along with ORBIS. Prince William was Patron of the appeal. Funds raised from the appeal enabled Wellbeing of Women to establish the Baby Bio Bank, a unique international resource storing genetic data from 'family trios' of mother, father and baby. This bank of genetic information will facilitate on-going research into the persistent complications of pregnancy and birth, including miscarriage, premature birth and pre-eclampsia.

== Present ==
=== Corporate Partners ===
In March 2013, Wellbeing of Women launched a major new partnership with PwC. PwC are long-term sponsors of two of Wellbeing of Women's flagship events - the Annual Women's Lunch Debate and Annual Celebrity Cricket Match – but in 2013 broadened and increased their support of the charity, by supporting two Wellbeing of Women funded researchers.

Wellbeing of Women has an ongoing partnership with BHS. Karren Brady designed a collection of workwear dresses to be sold at BHS in aid of the charity in 2012, and in 2013, Emma Forbes launched another collection of dresses to be sold in aid of the charity.

In December 2011, in the run-up to the 2012 Summer Olympics in Stratford, London, Clara Maidment shot a charity calendar in aid of Wellbeing of Women. Twelve British female sporting celebrities who posed in the lingerie of Nichole de Carle, wearing jewellery by Salima Hughes and Coster Diamonds.

=== Events ===
Wellbeing of Women runs a series of Literary Lunches at Fortnum & Mason, which feature a prominent author in conversation with Eve Pollard OBE or Baroness Jenkin of Kennington. Previous authors have included PD James, Barbara Taylor Bradford, Penny Vincenzi, Julian Fellowes and Ffion Hague.

They also run a series called 'An Audience with...' at Fortnum and Mason.

On 12 October 2011, the Right Reverend Vincent Nichols gave the first annual Sir George Pinker Memorial Address.

In 2020, Jennifer Saunders gave her first ever BBC Radio 4 appeal for the charity.

=== Campaigns ===
In 2021, Royal Patron the Countess of Wessex co-hosted a roundtable event with business leaders, celebrities and women, to launch the charity's first campaign: The Menopause Workplace Pledge. Over 1700 organisations, including the BBC, AstraZeneca, Royal Mail, and Tesco have signed the pledge and committed to supporting colleagues through the menopause. In 2022, Speaker of the House of Commons Sir Lindsay Hoyle signed the pledge, committing to make the House of Commons "menopause friendly" for staff.

In 2022, the charity launched a new campaign, called Let's #ChatMenopause, featuring films of women talking about their menopause experiences, including Carolyn Harris MP, Penny Lancaster, Zoe Hardman, Dr Nighat Arif, Michelle Griffith Robinson and women from the Armed Forces.
