= John Batten (physician) =

British physician

Sir John Batten KCVO, FRCP
- Born: John Charles Batten; 11 March 1924; Wandsworth, London, United Kingdom
- Died: 7 October 2013 (aged 89); London, England
- Occupation: Physician

Sir John Charles Batten KCVO, FRCP (11 March 1924 – 2013) was a British physician, who served as physician to Queen Elizabeth II from 1974 to 1989.

Batten was born in Wandsworth to Kathleen Gladys, née Charles, and Raymond Wallis Batten, the latter a business executive and justice of the peace. He was educated at Mill Hill School graduated in medicine from St Bartholomew's Hospital Medical School in 1946.

He undertook two-years National Service in Germany with the Royal Horse Guards, as a surgeon captain.

He was a consultant physician at King Edward VII Hospital for Officers from 1968 to 1989; and at King Edward VII Hospital, Midhurst from 1969 to 1989.

He served as president of the Cystic Fibrosis Trust from 1986 to 2003; of the British Lung Foundation from 1987 to 1995; and of the Medical Protection Society from 1988 to 1997. He was life vice president of the RNLI from 2000; a member of the board of governors of the Brompton Hospital from 1966 to 1969; and a trustee of the D'Oyly Carte Trust, as had been one of his grandfathers.

A Fellow of the Royal College of Physicians (FRCP), he was appointed a Knight Commander of the Royal Victorian Order (KCVO) in the 1987 New Year Honours.

He died on 7 October 2013.
