= Canning Suffern =

Canning Suffern (1892–1978) was a British naturalist. He is best known for his ornithological work at Titchfield Haven in Hampshire.
