= Hugh Lockhart-Mummery =

British surgeon

- Born: 28 April 1918
- Died: 24 June 1988 (aged 70)
- Relatives: John Howard Mummery (grand-father); John Lockhart-Mummery (father); James Crerar (father-in-law)

Sir Hugh Evelyn Lockhart-Mummery, KCVO, (28 April 1918 – 24 June 1988) was a British surgeon who researched inflammatory bowel disease and distinguished Crohn's from colitis. He was educated at Sandroyd School and Stowe School. He was Serjeant-Surgeon to The Queen.

== See also ==
- List of honorary medical staff at King Edward VII's Hospital for Officers
