= John Leonard Dawson =

English surgeon (1932-1999)

- Born: 30 September 1932; Leicester, England
- Died: 16 May 1999 (aged 66); Leicester, England
- Occupation: Surgeon

John Leonard Dawson CVO FRCS (30 September 1932 – 16 May 1999) was an English surgeon particularly known for his work in the field of liver disease. He pioneered several surgical techniques, including radical tumour resection, injection sclerotherapy and portosystemic shunt surgery. He served as the Serjeant Surgeon to the Royal Household of the United Kingdom, and was described by a peer as "the best general surgeon in London in the 1970s and 1980s".

== Early life and education ==
Dawson was born in Leicester in 1932, to Leslie Joseph Dawson and his wife Mabel née Jayes. He attended Wyggeston Grammar School for Boys in Leicester, and then studied pathology at King's College London School of Medicine, graduating MB BS in 1955. He served in Libya and Cyprus with the Royal Army Medical Corps for his National Service. He trained at St James's Hospital, Balham, under Norman Tanner, and also under Edward Muir at King's College London. He gained his Fellowship of the Royal Colleges of Surgeons in 1958. In 1963–64 he attended Boston City Hospital and Harvard University on a Nuffield Scholarship.

== Career ==
In 1964 or 1965, Dawson was appointed as a consultant surgeon at King's College Hospital, and he remained a surgeon there until 1994. He also held consultant positions at Bromley Hospital (1967–94) and the King Edward VII Hospital for Officers (1975–94). He was the Sir Arthur Sims Travelling Professor to Australasia (1981 or 1987). He succeeded Leonard Cotton as clinical dean of the Faculty of Medicine and Dentistry at King's College London School of Medicine (1988–92). He was president of the surgical section of the Royal Society of Medicine, served as vice-chair of the British Journal of Surgery (1981–89), and also worked for the Medical Appeals Tribunal Service. He was appointed surgeon to the Royal Household (1975–83), Surgeon to the Queen (1983–90) and Serjeant Surgeon (1990–91). He was a fellow of King's College London from 1995 until his death.

Described as an "excellent diagnostician" who offered "sympathetic and meticulous" care after surgery, one of his peers called Dawson "the best general surgeon in London in the 1970s and 1980s". His early work was on the causes of postoperative kidney failure; he also researched jaundice in association with kidney failure. He later specialised in liver disease. He pioneered several surgical techniques, including radical tumour resection, injection sclerotherapy and portosystemic shunt surgery for portal hypertension. His hepatic focus was important in developing the Liver Unit at King's College Hospital, which was established in 1966 by Roger Williams and soon built an international reputation.

== Personal life ==
In 1958, he married Rosemary Brundle, a physiotherapist; they had a daughter and two sons. His brother Anthony Dawson was a physician who served as Physician to the Queen. In 1991, Dawson was diagnosed with hepatitis and retired from some of his roles, continuing to work in others until his final year. He required a liver transplant and then developed spinal stenosis, for which he received surgery. He died in London on 16 May 1999, after a second liver transplant.

== Awards and honours ==
He was appointed a CVO in 1992. Dawson Ward at King's College Hospital was named in his honour.
