= Patrick Sellors =

English ophthalmologist

Sir Patrick John Holmes Sellors (11 February 1934 – 30 September 2010) was an English ophthalmologist. The son of the surgeon Sir Thomas Sellors, he was educated at the Oriel College, Oxford, and Middlesex Hospital Medical School. He then worked at Moorfields from 1962 to 1965 and then St George's Hospital, where he was ophthalmic surgeon until 1982. He also held appointments at the Royal Marsden Hospital, the Croydon Eye Unit at the Mayday Hospital, King Edward VII's Hospital and St Luke's Hospital for the Clergy. In 1974, he was made Surgeon-Oculist to the Royal Household and, from 1980 to 1999, he was Surgeon-Oculist to the Queen.
