= John Peel (gynaecologist) =

British doctor (1904–2005)

Sir John Peel KCVO FRCOG FRCS FRCP
- 1970 portrait by Edward I. Halliday
- Born: 10 December 1904
- Died: 31 December 2005 (aged 101)
- Education: King's College London School of Medicine
- Scientific career
- Fields: Obstetrics and Gynaecology

Sir John Harold Peel KCVO FRCOG FRCS FRCP (10 December 1904 – 31 December 2005) was a leading British obstetrician and gynecologist, who was Surgeon-Gynaecologist to Elizabeth II from 1961 to 1973, present at a number of royal births.

== Early life ==
The son of a Methodist clergyman, John Harold Peel was educated at Manchester Grammar School and Queen's College, Oxford.

== Career ==
Studying and specialising in gynaecology at King's College London School of Medicine, London, he qualified as a doctor in 1930, and passed his membership exams for the Royal College of Physicians in 1932. Appointed consultant surgeon for obstetrics and gynaecology at King's College Hospital, in 1937 he moved to the Princess Beatrice Hospital in London, where he remained as a consultant until 1965.

Between 1948 and 1967, Peel was director of clinical studies at King's College Hospital Medical School. He was an examiner at around a dozen British universities, including Oxford, Cambridge, London and Bristol.

Peel became a Fellow of the Royal College of Obstetricians and Gynaecologists in 1944. In 1955 he became a member of its council, and in 1959 its honorary treasurer, there by raising sufficient funds to allow the college to move into premises in Regent's Park. Between 1966 and 1969 he was President of the RCOG, elected to an honorary fellowship in 1989.

== Surgeon-Gynaecologist to Queen Elizabeth II ==
Peel assisted Royal Surgeon-Gynaecologist Sir William Gilliatt at the births of Prince Charles (1948) and Princess Anne (1950).

After the death of Sir William Gilliatt in 1956, from 1961 to 1973 Peel himself was appointed Surgeon-Gynaecologist to Queen Elizabeth II. Peel hence delivered a number of royal births, including: The Prince Andrew (1960); The Prince Edward (1964) (both assisted by John Brudenell), Viscount Linley (1961) and Lady Sarah Armstrong-Jones (1964).

Peel himself was replaced by Sir George Pinker.

== Abortion Act 1967 ==
Whilst President of the RCOG, in 1967 Peel chaired the committee advising the British Government on what became the 1967 Abortion Act; the Committee reported in favour of the bill.

== Peel Report 1971 ==
Peel headed a number of steering groups and committees to government agencies, which included chairing the important Peel Report: Enquiry into Domiciliary Midwifery Beds Needs (1971) for the Department of Health and Social Security. To reduce maternal and infant mortality, the report recommended that all women should give birth in a hospital and remain there for some days. Among the Report's critics was epidemiologist Archie Cochrane, who pointed out that there was little correlation between high hospitalisation rates and lower perinatal mortality. The report however resulted in a change in the medical establishment's approach to maternity, at the expense of domiciliary midwifery services.

== Other works ==
Peel was the author of Textbook of Gynaecology (1943); Lives of the Fellows of Royal College of Obstetricians and Gynaecologists 1929–1969 (1976); and Biography of William Blair Bell (1986).

In the 1980s, as sponsor of the Responsible Society, Peel accused the Department of Education and the Department of Health and Social Security of encouraging girls under 16 to have sexual intercourse:

Young girls are the victims of exploitation by unscrupulous adults, by misleading information in popular teenage magazines; by pernicious theories from some 'trendy' experts; all leading to the glorification of sex for physical satisfaction alone.

== Personal life ==
Peel was married three times: His first marriage was to Muriel Elaine Pellow in 1936, with whom he had a daughter; in 1947 he married Freda Margaret Mellish; and two years after the death of his second wife, he married Sally Barton in 1993.

Peel was a keen gardener, owned a stock of Friesian cattle on his farm, and enjoyed Salmon fishing on the River Spey in Scotland.
