= Nicholas Sturridge =

British dentist

Sir Nicholas Antony Sturridge, KCVO is a British dentist.

He is the son of Frank Sturridge, a dentist in the practice founded by his father, the American émigré Dr Ernest Sturridge, in London in 1898; since 1962, the family practice has been based on Harley Street. Nicholas graduated from the Royal Dental Hospital with a Bachelor of Dental Science degree in 1961; he then went to the United States to complete his postgraduate studies, earning a Doctor of Dental Science degree two years later at Northwestern University.

In 1964, he joined the family practice, along with his two brothers Arthur and Christopher Between 1975 and 2007, he was also Surgeon-Dentist to the Queen, a position in the Medical Household. For his service, he was appointed a Commander of the Royal Victorian Order in 1986, and promoted to Knight Commander in 2007.

Sturridge's daughter, Celine, who is a specialist in Prosthodontics, joined the family practice in 2003.
