= Beacon Academy, Crowborough =

Beacon Academy

Location
- East Beeches Road; Crowborough, East Sussex, TN6 2AS; England
- Coordinates: 51.0555°N 0.17196°E

Information
- Type: Academy
- Department for Education URN: 137982 Tables
- Ofsted: Reports
- Principal: Keith Slattery
- Gender: Coeducational
- Age: 11 to 18
- Enrolment: 1,513 as of March 2023
- Website: www.beacon-academy.org

Beacon Academy (formerly Beacon Community College) is a coeducational secondary school and sixth form located in Crowborough in the English county of East Sussex.

The school opened in 1955 and converted to academy status in April 2012. It was previously a community school administered by East Sussex County Council. Today, the school is sponsored by the MARK Education Trust.

Beacon Academy offers GCSEs and BTECs as programmes of study for pupils, while students in the sixth form have the option to study from a range of A Levels and further BTECs.
