= Jill Dando =

English journalist and television presenter (1961–1999)

- Born: Jill Wendy Dando; 9 November 1961; Weston-super-Mare, Somerset, England
- Died: 26 April 1999 (aged 37); Fulham, London, England
- Cause of death: Gunshot wound (murder)
- Resting place: Ebdon Road Cemetery
- Education: South Glamorgan Institute of Higher Education
- Occupations: Journalist, television presenter, newsreader
- Years active: 1979–1999
- Employer(s): BBC, Weston Mercury
- Partner: Alan Farthing (engaged)

Jill Wendy Dando (9 November 1961 – 26 April 1999) was an English journalist, television presenter and newsreader. She spent most of her career at the BBC and was the corporation's Personality of the Year in 1997. At the time of her death, her television work included co-presenting the BBC One programme Crimewatch with Nick Ross.

On the morning of 26 April 1999, Dando was shot dead outside her home in Fulham, London, prompting the biggest murder inquiry ever conducted by the Metropolitan Police and the country's largest criminal investigation since the Peter Sutcliffe case. A local man, Barry George, was convicted and imprisoned for the murder, but was acquitted eight years later following an appeal and retrial. No other suspect has been charged, and the case remains unsolved.

== Early life ==
Jill Wendy Dando was born at Ashcombe House Maternity Home in Weston-super-Mare, Somerset, on 9 November 1961. She was the daughter of Jack Dando (11 February 1918 – 11 February 2009) and Winifred Mary Jean Hockey (26 August 1927 – 7 January 1986), who died of leukaemia aged 58. Her only sibling, brother Nigel (born 1952), worked as a journalist for BBC Radio Bristol before retiring in 2017, having previously worked in local newspapers since the 1970s. Dando was raised as a Baptist and remained a devout follower. When she was three years old, it was discovered that she had a hole in her heart and a blocked pulmonary artery; she had heart surgery on 12 January 1965.

Dando was educated at Worle Infant School, Greenwood Junior School, Worle Community School and Weston College Sixth Form, where she was head girl and completed her A-levels. She then went on to graduate with a degree in journalism from Cardiff Metropolitan University.

Dando was a member of Weston-super-Mare Amateur Dramatic Society and Exeter Little Theatre Company, with whom she appeared in plays at the Barnfield Theatre. She was a volunteer at Sunshine Hospital Radio in Weston-super-Mare in 1979.

== Career ==
Dando's first job was as a trainee reporter for the local weekly newspaper, the Weston Mercury, where her father and brother worked. After five years as a print journalist, she started to work for the BBC, becoming a newsreader for BBC Radio Devon in 1985. That year, she transferred to BBC South West, where she presented a regional news magazine programme, Spotlight South West. In 1987, she worked for Television South West, then BBC Spotlight in Plymouth. In early 1988, Dando moved from regional to national television in London to present the BBC's national news, specifically the short on-the-hour bulletins that aired on both BBC1 and BBC2 from 1986 until the mid-1990s.

Dando presented the BBC television programmes Breakfast Time, Breakfast News, the BBC One O'Clock News, the Six O'Clock News, the travel programme Holiday, the crime appeal series Crimewatch (from 1995 until her death) and occasionally Songs of Praise. In 1994, she moved to Fulham. She was the subject of This Is Your Life on 8 November 1996.

On 25 April 1999, Dando presented the first episode of Antiques Inspectors, with filming of the series' final episode having concluded two days previously. She was scheduled to present the Six O'Clock News on the evening of the following day. She was featured on the cover of that week's Radio Times magazine (from 24 to 30 April). Dando was also booked to host the British Academy Television Awards 1999, alongside Michael Parkinson, at Grosvenor House Hotel on 9 May. On 5 September, BBC One resumed airing of Antiques Inspectors; the programme was cancelled following her death, but it was decided later in the year that it should be aired as a tribute to Dando. The final episode aired on 24 October.

At the time of her death, Dando was among those with the highest profile of the BBC's on-screen staff, and had been the 1997 BBC Personality of the Year. Crimewatch reconstructed her murder in an attempt to aid the police in the search for her killer. After Barry George was charged with the murder but acquitted, Crimewatch made no further appeals for information concerning the case.

== Personal life ==
From 1989 to 1996, Dando engaged in a relationship with BBC executive Bob Wheaton. She then had a brief relationship with national park warden Simon Basil. In December 1997, Dando met gynaecologist Alan Farthing, later Queen Elizabeth II's personal physician, on a blind date set up by a mutual friend. Farthing was separated from his wife at the time. A couple of months after Farthing's divorce was finalised, the couple announced that they were engaged on 31 January 1999. Their wedding was set to take place on 25 September.

== Assassination ==
On the morning of 26 April 1999, 37-year-old Dando left Farthing's home in Chiswick. She returned alone, by car, to the house she owned at 29 Gowan Avenue, Fulham. She had lived in the house, but by April 1999 was in the process of selling it and did not visit it frequently. The purpose of her visit was to collect contract documents which had been faxed there by her agent, Jon Roseman. As Dando reached her front door at about 11:32 BST, she was shot once in the head. Her body was discovered by neighbours, who called police at 11:47. Dando was taken to the nearby Charing Cross Hospital where she was declared dead on arrival at 13:03.

As Dando was about to put her keys in the lock to open the front door of her home in Fulham, she was grabbed from behind. With his right arm, the assailant held her and forced her to the ground, so that her face was almost touching the tiled step of the porch. Then, with his left hand, he fired a single shot at her left temple, killing her instantly. The bullet entered her head just above her ear, parallel to the ground, and came out the right side of her head.

— Bob Woffinden, The Guardian (July 2002)

Richard Hughes, Dando's next-door neighbour, heard her scream ("I thought it was someone surprising somebody") but heard no gunshot. Hughes looked out of his front window and, while not realising what had happened, made the only certain sighting of the killer — a six-foot-tall (183 cm) white man aged around 40, walking away from Dando's house.

Forensic firearm examination indicated that Dando had been shot by a bullet from a 9mm Short calibre semi-automatic pistol, with the gun pressed against her head at the moment of the shot. The cartridge appeared to have been subject to workshop modification, possibly to reduce its propellent charge and thus allow it to function as subsonic ammunition. Police ballistics checks also determined that the bullet had been fired from a smooth bore barrel without any rifling, which indicated the murder weapon was almost certainly a blank firing pistol that had been illegally modified to fire live ammunition.

=== Investigation ===
After Dando's murder, there was intense media coverage. An investigation by the Metropolitan Police, named Operation Oxborough, proved fruitless for over a year. Her status as a well-known public figure had brought her into contact with thousands of people, and she was known to millions. There was huge speculation regarding the motive for the murder.

Investigating authorities quickly ruled out the work of a professional assassin due to the many amateurish aspects of the crime, such as the use of a converted blank firing pistol as the murder weapon and the fact Dando was shot on her doorstep rather than after first being forced inside her house where her body would not be discovered for a much longer time period. Forensic psychologists working on the case predicted that the perpetrator would instead be a loner with a severe personality disorder.

Within six months, the Murder Investigation Team had spoken to more than 2,500 people and taken more than 1,000 statements. With little progress after a year, police concentrated their attention on Barry George, who lived about 500 yards from Dando's house on Crookham Road. George had a history of stalking women, sexual offences and other antisocial and attention seeking behaviour. George was put under surveillance, arrested on 25 May 2000 and charged with Dando's murder on 28 May. A search of George's bedsit had uncovered over 4,000 photographs of hundreds of women covertly taken in public, along with other photos of other female television personalities such as Caron Keating, Anthea Turner, Fiona Foster and Emma Freud, in addition to newspaper article cuttings regarding Dando’s life and media career. Police also discovered a photo of George wearing a military gas mask while posing with a modified Bruni blank-firing handgun. When shown this image during interrogation, George admitted it was him in the photo and that he had purchased the weapon via mail order, but denied that it had been converted to fire live ammunition.

=== Trial of Barry George ===
==== Opening statements ====
George's trial began at the Old Bailey in early May 2001. Opening statements from the lead prosecution lawyer, Orlando Pownall QC, outlined how George had "an exaggerated interest" in television personalities and firearms, and that photographic evidence regarding his obsession with celebrities had been recovered from his apartment. Pownall went on to describe how police had recovered a photo of George posing with a blank-firing pistol, similar to the weapon police believed was used in Dando's murder, and how he had been picked out of an identity parade by two different neighbours of Dando as the man they had seen acting suspiciously opposite her Gowan Avenue home on the morning of the murder. Authorities had also found several cut-out newspaper articles regarding Dando's murder in George's apartment, along with handwritten lists of names and personal details of various other British celebrities. Pownall added that forensic examination of a jacket seized from George's apartment found firearm discharge residue inside a pocket of the same type that was detected on Dando's body, and was believed to have originated from the detonation of the percussion cap of the bullet that killed her.

==== Prosecution evidence ====
The court heard how George had visited a disability health centre in Greswell Street, approximately half a mile from Gowan Avenue, without an appointment about twenty minutes after Dando's murder. Witnesses at the scene described him as being in an agitated state and carrying a plastic bag full of complaint letters. George returned to the centre a couple of days later, asking staff about the exact time of his original visit, as he claimed a description of the prime suspect had been released that matched his appearance. The prosecution argued that George's motive for visiting the centre was to establish an alibi for his whereabouts around the time of the murder.

The owner of a taxi company testified that George had visited his office on Fulham Palace Road several hours after the murder, remarking that he appeared agitated and had no money to pay for his requested journey. George also returned to the office a couple of days later to ask about the time of his original visit and what he was wearing then. Although George would later claim in police interviews that he wanted to account for his movements after being told by other people that he matched a photofit picture of the suspect issued by authorities, police records proved that the photofit was not released to the public until four days after the murder.

Detective Constable John Gallagher described how he interviewed George in April 2000 so as to eliminate him from inquires, and George had stated how he remained at home on the morning of the murder before attending a disability group in Fulham around lunchtime. Six days later the police broke into George's flat to search it for evidence, taking several items away for further examination. They returned in early May 2000 to carry out further searches, before a final search was carried out after George's arrest at the end of that month. Items seized included clothing, military-related books and handwritten documents. Among these were lists compiled by George of the home addresses, physical descriptions and car registration numbers of almost 100 women, including Princess Diana. Detectives also processed hundreds of undeveloped camera rolls seized from his flat, which showed George had taken thousands of photographs of over 400 different women around Hammersmith and Fulham without their knowledge. A Cecil Gee branded overcoat was also seized as evidence, and was later found to have traces of firearm residue inside one of its pockets.

==== Defence submissions ====
Lead defence lawyer Michael Mansfield QC asserted to the jury that Dando's death was caused by a professional assassin, and that but for a microscopic speck of alleged firearms residue inside George’s coat pocket, the prosecution would have no evidence whatsoever against his client. Mansfield also raised the possibility of cross-contamination from police firearms officers as to why the residue was found in the first place. The defence suggested that Dando was killed on orders of Serbian warlord Željko Ražnatović in revenge for her involvement in a charity campaign for Kosovan refugees during the Kosovo War. Mansfield denied police accusations that George had been stalking Dando in the lead up to her murder, highlighting how that although he had accumulated the photographs and personal details of many other female TV presenters, no such material relating to Dando was discovered in his apartment when police searched it.

==== Closing statements ====
Pownall dismissed accusations that Dando's death was the result of a contract killing by Serbian extremists, highlighting how it would be pointless to commit such a crime and then not claim responsibility via the media. The prosecutor added that when all the circumstantial evidence presented in court after an exhaustive police investigation was considered in whole, the only candidate for the murder was George. Mansfield countered that there was no conclusive proof that George was present in Gowan Avenue on the morning of the murder, with several witnesses giving different descriptions of his clothing, facial complexion and hairstyle. Mansfield also disputed the prosecution's assertion that George, after first returning home to change clothes, had visited the disability centre to create an alibi, asking the jury why a gunman who had just committed a murder would bother going out in public after successfully escaping detection in the first place.

==== Verdict ====
On 2 July 2001, after over thirty hours of deliberations, George was found guilty as charged by a majority verdict of ten to one. He received a mandatory life sentence.

=== Conviction quashed ===
Concern about the conviction was widespread on the basis that the case against George appeared thin. Two appeals were unsuccessful, but after discredited forensic evidence was excluded from the prosecution's case, George's third appeal succeeded in November 2007. The original conviction was quashed and a second trial lasting eight weeks ended in George's acquittal on 1 August 2008.

After the acquittal, some newspapers published articles which appeared to suggest that he was guilty of the Dando murder and other offences against women. In December 2009, George accepted substantial damages from News Group Newspapers over articles in The Sun and the News of the World, following a libel action in the High Court of Justice.

=== Lines of inquiry ===
Lines of inquiry explored in the original police investigation included:

- Theories that a jealous ex-boyfriend or an unknown lover had killed Dando. This was quickly ruled out by detectives who interviewed all Dando's friends and acquaintances and checked her phone calls.
- A belief that somebody had hired an assassin to murder Dando as revenge for their being convicted as a result of evidence garnered by Crimewatch viewers. After exhaustive inquiries this was also ruled out by detectives.
- Various theories relating to Bosnian-Serb or Yugoslav groups in retaliation for NATO actions against Serbian media outlets and her appeals for aid during the Yugoslav Wars.
- The possibility that a deranged fan may have killed Dando after she had rejected his approaches. Dando's brother, Nigel, informed detectives that she had become concerned by “some guy pestering her” in the few days before her death, but this was ruled out by detectives.
- A case of mistaken identity. This was judged unlikely, given that the killing took place on the doorstep of Dando's own home.
- Following the Jimmy Savile sexual abuse scandal, a claim was made that Dando had investigated a paedophile ring at the BBC during the mid-1990s and had handed a dossier containing her findings to BBC management, purportedly prompting a revenge attack. The BBC said it had seen no evidence to support the claim.
- Actions taken by a professional rival or business partner also had to be considered. Dando's agent, Jon Roseman, stated that he had been interviewed as a suspect by police.

The investigation had explored the possibility of a contract killing, but since Dando was living with her fiancé and was only rarely visiting her Fulham residence, it was considered unlikely that a professional assassin would have been sufficiently well informed about her movements to have known at what time she was going to be there. CCTV evidence of Dando's last journey (mainly security video recordings from a shopping centre in Hammersmith, which she visited on her way to Fulham) did not show any sign of her being followed.

Initial investigations focused on Dando's personal circle, since only a few people knew of her intention to visit her Gowan Avenue house on the day. Roseman was an initial suspect since he knew Dando was going there to collect faxes he had sent her, but he convinced detectives of his innocence. Bob Wheaton also attracted attention since he was a jilted lover, and Dando had transferred £35,000 to him towards the end of their relationship. Wheaton stated that this transfer was a gift and not a loan. He also convinced detectives of his innocence.

On the night of her death, Dando's BBC colleague Nick Ross said on Newsnight that retaliatory attacks by criminals against police, lawyers and judges were almost unknown in the UK. Forensic examination of the cartridge case and bullet recovered from the scene of the attack suggested that the weapon used had been the result of a workshop conversion of a replica or decommissioned gun. It was argued that a professional assassin would not use such a poor-quality weapon. Police therefore soon began to favour the idea that the killing had been opportunistically carried out by a crazed individual. This assumed profile of the perpetrator led to the focus on Barry George.

Cold case reviews by police after 2008 concluded that Dando was killed by a professional assassin in a "hard contact execution". Pressing the gun against her head would have acted as a suppressor—muffling the sound of the shot and preventing the killer from being splattered with blood.

=== Yugoslav/Serbian connection ===
In early 1999, the United Kingdom and NATO were involved in the Kosovo War, opposing Serbia. Immediately after Dando's murder, a number of telephone calls were made to the BBC and other media outlets claiming responsibility for the killing on behalf of Serb groups. These calls stated that the murder was revenge for the NATO bombing campaign in Serbia, and threatened further killings. These calls were not judged wholly credible and may have been hoaxes. Nevertheless, at George's first trial, Mansfield proposed that Ražnatović had ordered Dando's assassination in retaliation for NATO's bombing of Radio Television of Serbia (RTS). Mansfield suggested that Dando's earlier presentation of an appeal for aid for Kosovar Albanian refugees may have attracted the attention of Bosnian-Serb hardliners. Dando's appeal for aid for the Kosovar Albanian refugees had been shown on television three weeks before her murder.

In 2019, it was reported that the British National Criminal Intelligence Service (NCIS) had given an intelligence report to the Dando murder enquiry claiming that the killing was in retaliation for the RTS bombing and that Ražnatović had ordered it. The report highlighted a possible connection between the bullet used to kill Dando and bullets used in assassinations in Germany, namely handmade markings found on them. An opposition journalist, Slavko Ćuruvija, was assassinated outside his home in Belgrade just fifteen days before Dando's murder by two masked men, who shot him 12 times after firing 17 rounds. In 2019, four men of the Serbian Secret Service were convicted of this murder. However, the verdicts were reversed on appeal in 2024, which led to a widely criticized acquittal of the four. In 2002, journalist Bob Woffinden had advanced the view that a Yugoslav group was behind the Dando killing and, in various newspaper articles, contested all the grounds on which police had dismissed this possibility.

== Legacy ==
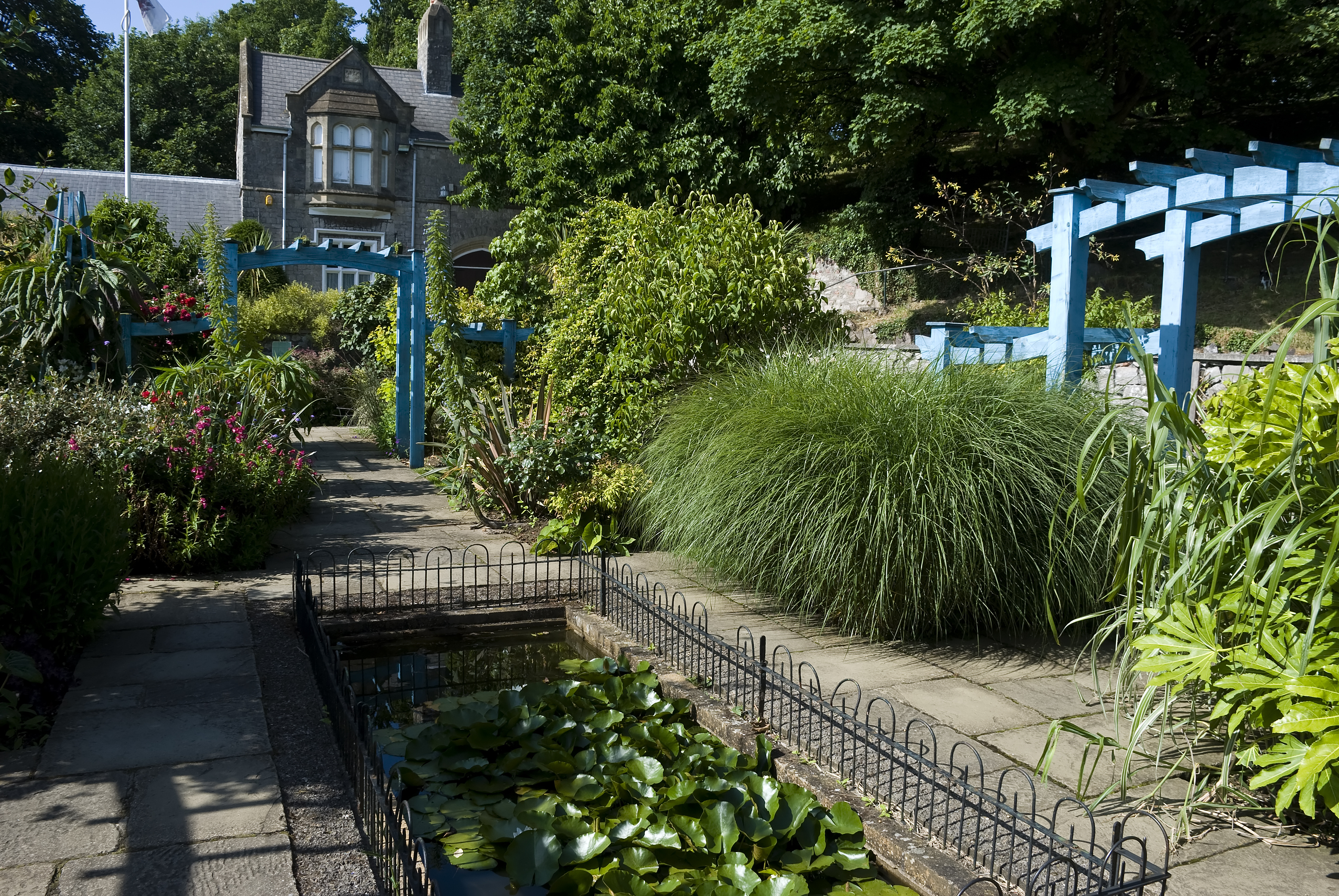
Dando's garden in Weston-super-Mare

Dando's funeral took place on 21 May 1999 at Clarence Park Baptist Church in Weston-super-Mare. She was buried next to her mother in the town's Ebdon Road Cemetery. Her father inherited all of her estate, valued at £607,000 after debts and taxes, because she died intestate.

Dando's co-presenter Nick Ross proposed the formation of an academic institute in her name and, together with her fiancé Alan Farthing, raised almost £1.5 million. The Jill Dando Institute of Crime Science was founded at University College London on 26 April 2001, the second anniversary of her murder.

A memorial garden designed and realised by the BBC Television Ground Force team in Dando's memory, using plants and colours that were special to her, is located within Grove Park, Weston-super-Mare, and was opened on 2 August 2001. The BBC set up a bursary award in Dando's memory, which enables one student each year to study broadcast journalism at Falmouth University. Sophie Long, who was then a postgraduate who had grown up in Weston-super-Mare and is now a presenter on BBC News, gained the first bursary award in 2000.

In 2007, Weston College opened a new university campus on the site of the former Broadoak Sixth Form Centre where Dando studied. The sixth-form building has been dedicated to her and named the Jill Dando Centre.

The life, death and subsequent police investigation of Jill Dando was the subject of a true crime Netflix miniseries titled Who Killed Jill Dando?, released in 2023 and running for a total of three 44-minute-long episodes. The miniseries received mixed reviews from critics, citing pacing issues, although the documentary's usage of vintage archive footage from Dando's career and early childhood were also noted as a point of interest. Critic Lucy Mangan drew attention to the details shared by Dando's brother, Nigel, of the two siblings "eating sand-blown lettuce sandwiches" on the beach together and how this added to the thoroughness of the story presented. The miniseries also interviewed Barry George, who was 63 and living with his sister in Ireland at the time of filming. George stated, "I live in Ireland now. It's quiet here. You're treated like a scab in London, but you're not here."

Media offices
Preceded by Sue Cook	Co-host of Crimewatch; 1995–1999; With: Nick Ross	Succeeded by Fiona Bruce
