= Barry Jackson (surgeon) =

British surgeon

Sir Barry Jackson FRCS FRCP FRSM FRCSGlas
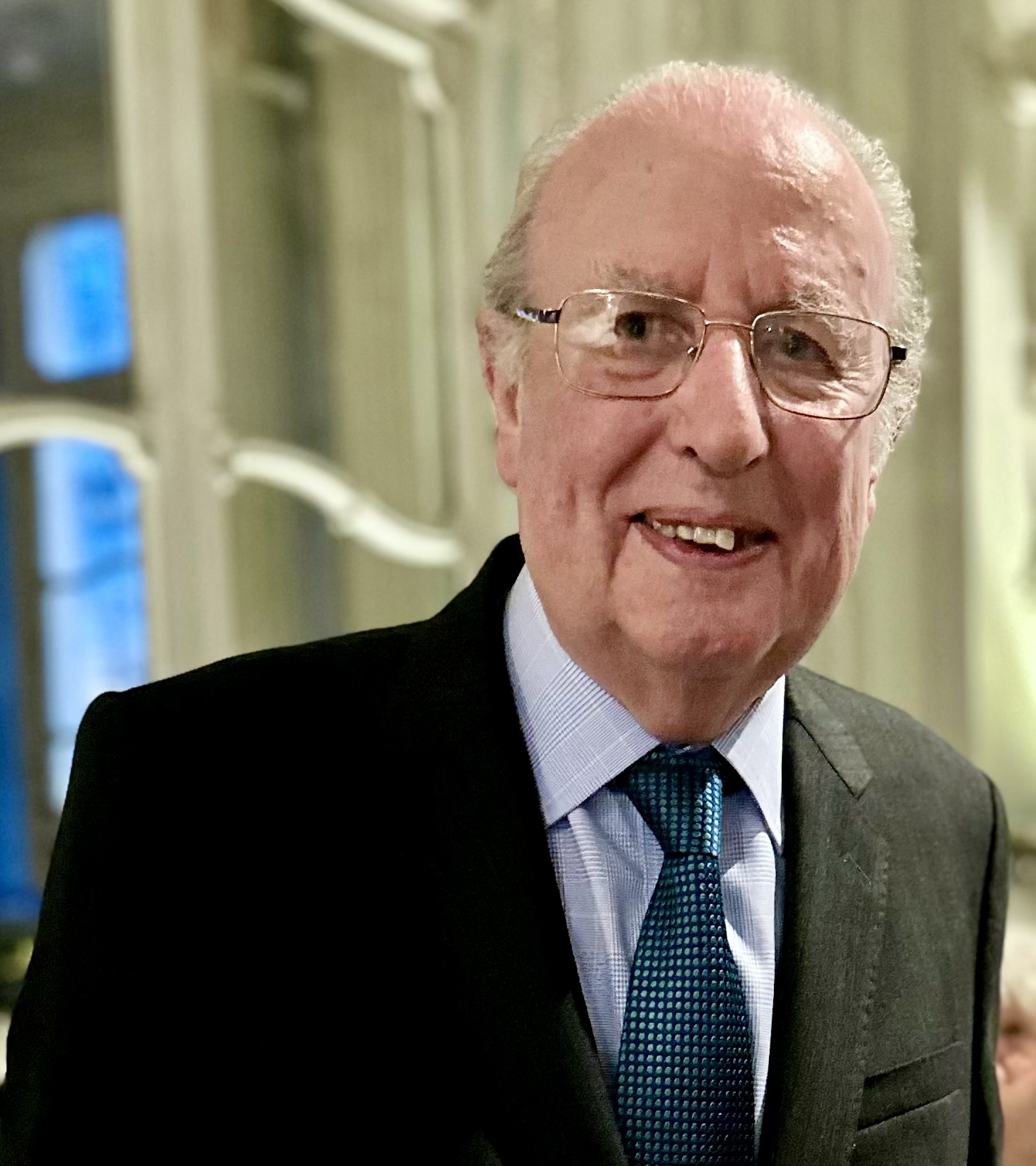
- Jackson, Savile Club, London (2023)
- Born: July 1936 (age 89–90)
- Known for: Serjeant Surgeon to The Queen (1991–2001); President of the Royal College of Surgeons (1998–2001)
- Medical career
- Profession: Surgeon
- Field: Gastrointestinal surgery
- Institutions: St Thomas' Hospital

Sir Barry Trevor Jackson (born July 1936) is a British retired surgeon, who, between 1991 and 2001, was Serjeant Surgeon to the Queen, and president of the Royal College of Surgeons from 1998 to 2001. He was made a Knight Bachelor in the 2001 New Year Honours, "for services to training and education in surgery".

He served as president of the Royal Society of Medicine from 2002 to 2004. Previously, he was a gastrointestinal surgeon at St Thomas' Hospital, London, for more than 30 years.

== Publications ==
- Jackson, Barry. "Treatment of depression by self-reinforcement." Behavior Therapy (1972). doi:10.1016/S0005-7894(72)80095-9
- Jackson, Barry Alan, James A. Schwane, and Barry C. Starcher. "Effect of ultrasound therapy on the repair of Achilles tendon injuries in rats." Medicine and science in sports and exercise 23, no. 2 (1991): 171-176.
- Jackson, Barry. "What Makes an Excellent Surgeon?" Obesity Surgery 29, 1087–1089 (2019). doi:10.1007/s11695-019-03778-8
