= Polyposis registries =

Polyposis registries exists for the purpose of understanding the genetic disease familial adenomatous polyposis. The registries provide a service to doctors for identification, surveillance and management of families and individuals with high colorectal cancer risk from Familial Adenomatous Polyposis (FAP) and Hereditary Non-Polyposis Colorectal Cancer (HNPCC). The Centers for Disease Control and Prevention of the United States provides, royalty-free, Registry Plus software for collecting and processing cancer registry data compliant with national standards established by health professionals and regulators to understand and address the burden of cancer more effectively.

Polyposis registries have been used in numerous academic studies to assess morbidity and mortality of colorectal cancer related to FAP, and use of registry data has resulted in improved treatment and reduced mortality from polyposis-related colorectal cancer.

The University of Texas M. D. Anderson Cancer Center maintains an international list of registries related to hereditary colon cancer.

== Registries ==
Some of the registries include: -

=== North America ===
- Steve Atanas Stavro Familial Gastrointestinal Cancer Registry (Mount Sinai Hospital, Toronto, Ontario, Canada)
- The Johns Hopkins Hereditary Colorectal Cancer Registry (Johns Hopkins School of Medicine, Baltimore, MD, USA)

=== Europe ===
- St Mark's Hospital Polyposis Registry (St Mark's Hospital Foundation, St Mark's Hospital, Middlesex, United Kingdom)
- F.A.P.A. Belgian Familial Adenomatous Polyposis and Lynch Syndrome Non-Profit Organization (F.A.P.A., Brussels, Belgium)

=== Asia ===
- Singapore Polyposis Registry (Singapore General Hospital, Singapore)

== See also ==
- Familial Adenomatous Polyposis
