= Stanley Paul =

British publishing firm)

Stanley Paul were a firm of publishers founded in London in 1906.

The original firm published mainly "cheap editions of thrillers and romances, and some light non-fiction" and traded until 1927 when it went in liquidation. In 1928, the imprint was resurrected as a subsidiary of Hutchinson and Company, when it became known as publishers of sports books.

The firm became an imprint of London Weekend Television in 1979, Century Hutchinson from 1985, and Random Century from 1989.

== Book series ==
- The A.B.C. Series
- The Arsenal Football Books
- The Chelsea Football Books
- Christy Juvenile Fiction Series
- Cole's Fun Doctor
- Companion Series
- The Craftman's Art
- The Essex Library
- The Everyday Series
- The Fantômas Detective Novels
- Go and Play
- Hobbies for All
- The International Library
- Joy of Life Novels
- The Knorr Family of Apron-Pocket Books
- Lotus Library
- New Believe It or Not!
- The New Novel Library
- Playing for Celtic
- Practical Hints Series
- The Rogue's Library
- Sell at Sight Novels
- Stanley Paul's Empire Library
- Stanley Paul's New Series of Readable Fiction
- Stanley Paul's Shilling Series
- Stanley Paul's 3/6 Net Novels
- The Tackle Series
- Tackle Sport This Way
- Taurus Library of Sport
- The Tottenham Hotspur Football Books
- Treasure Library
- The Vade-Mecum Series
- The Wisden Papers
- Wonderful Rewards
- Worldbeaters
