= William Slack (surgeon) =

Surgeon to Queen Elizabeth II (1925–2019)

Sir William Willatt Slack (22 February 1925 – 28 April 2019) was a surgeon who became dean of UCL Medical School and Serjeant Surgeon to Queen Elizabeth II.
