= Serjeant Surgeon =

The Serjeant Surgeon is the senior surgeon in the Medical Household of the Royal Household of the Sovereign of the United Kingdom. The origin of the post dates back to 1253. Early serjeant surgeons were military surgeons who followed their king into battle.

John Arderne, later famous as the Father of Proctology, accompanied Edward III at the Battle of Crécy in 1346. But the title did not refer to a military rank; the word "serjeant" comes from the Latin "serviens" or "serving".

Over the years, other duties of the Serjeant Surgeon have included embalming of the royal corpse, oversight of torture to ensure the prisoner was not killed, and the screening of applicants to be touched by the king for the cure of the King's evil (tuberculous glands of the neck).

The first knighthood to be granted to a serjeant surgeon was in the reign of Henry VIII, to John Aylef, who was said to have cured the King of a fistula. The first serjeant surgeon to receive a peerage was Joseph Lister, the founder of antiseptic surgery, who was created Baron Lister of Lyme Regis in the County of Dorset by Queen Victoria.

== Pre-twentieth century ==
- Thomas Vicary 1490–1561
- Claudius Amyand 1715–1740
- Robert Adair 1773–1789
- Robert Keate FRCS 1841
- Benjamin Travers 1857–1858
- Sir William Lawrence, 1st Baronet FRCS FRS 1858
- Caesar Hawkins FRS 1862
- Sir Prescott Gardner Hewett, 1st Baronet 1884
- Sir James Paget, 1st Baronet
- Joseph Lister, 1st Baron Lister 1900 (to Queen Victoria)

== List of serjeant surgeons from the beginning of the twentieth century ==
- Joseph Lister, 1st Baron Lister, FRS 1901 (re-appointed to King Edward VII)
- Colonel Sir Frederick Treves, 1st Baronet, 1902–1910
- Major General Sir Richard Havelock Charles, 1st Baronet 1910–1928
- Colonel Sir Hugh Rigby, 1st Baronet 1928–1932
- Wilfred Trotter MD MS FRCS FRS 1932–1939
- Sir Thomas Peel Dunhill 1928–1957
- Brigadier Sir Arthur Porritt, 1st Baronet MA MB MChir FRCS 1946–1966
- Sir Ralph Marnham MChir FRCS 1967–1971
- Sir Edward Muir MS FRCS 1972–1973
- Sir Edward Tuckwell MCh FRCS 1973–1975
- Sir Hugh Lockhart-Mummery MD MChir FRCS LRCP 1975–1983
- Sir William Slack MD MCh BM FRCS 1983–1990
- John Leonard Dawson MS FRCS 1990–1991
- Sir Barry Jackson MS FRCS 1991–2001
- Adam Lewis 2001–2006
- Sir Roger Vickers FRCS 2006–2010
- George Hamilton MD FRCS 2010–2016
- Satyajit Bhattacharya MB MS MPhil FRCS 2016–2023
- Ranan DasGupta LVO MA MD MRCS FRCS(Urol) 2023–present

== Honorary serjeant surgeons ==
- Sir William MacCormac, 1st Baronet 1901
- Sir Thomas Smith, 1st Baronet 1901–1909
- Sir Frederick Treves, 1st Baronet, FRCS 1901 (he was appointed Serjeant Surgeon the following year)
