= Peter Fisher (physician) =

British doctor

Fisher in 2015

Peter Antony Goodwin Fisher, FRCP (2 September 1950 – 15 August 2018) was an English physician who served as Homeopathic physician to Queen Elizabeth II for 17 years.

== Life ==
A graduate of Emmanuel College, Cambridge, he went on to train at Westminster Hospital Medical School.

He was an Honorary Consultant Rheumatologist at King's College Hospital. He served as Clinical Director for 18 years, and Director of Research at the Royal London Hospital for Integrated Medicine (formerly the Royal London Homoeopathic Hospital) for 22 years. He was also President of the Faculty of Homeopathy and Editor-in-chief of the journal Homeopathy.

Fisher chaired the World Health Organisation's working group on homeopathy and served on their Expert Advisory Panel on Traditional and Complementary Medicine.

As a prominent practitioner of alternative medicine he was frequently criticised by sceptics. In 2006 he participated in a debate with science writer Ben Goldacre at the Natural History Museum on Does Homeopathy Work?; his contribution was described by evidence-based medicine campaigner David Colquhoun as "shameless cherry-picking of the evidence". His claim that randomised controlled trials "cannot capture the possible benefits of homeopathy" and his defence of the disproven "water memory" hypothesis of homeopathic medicine was critiqued by Rose Shapiro in her book Suckers.

Fisher was awarded the Polish Academy of Medicine's Albert Schweitzer Gold Medal in 2007.

He had two daughters, Lily and Eve, from his marriage to Nina Oxenham, from whom he was divorced in 2015.

Fisher's other interests were gardening, sailing, swimming, skiing and scuba diving. As well as English, he spoke French, Afrikaans, and Dutch as a child.

== Death ==
Fisher died in a cycling accident on 15 August 2018. Following his death, Dr Gill Gaskin, medical director of the specialist hospitals board of University College London Hospitals (UCLH), said, "Peter was a highly regarded colleague and friend of many at the RLHIM, where he worked for more than 35 years. He was an international figure in homeopathy who was committed to holistic and compassionate care for his patients."

== Publications ==
- Alternative Answers to Arthritis and Rheumatism, 1999
- Numerous articles on homeopathy, including:
  - Fisher, Peter (2006). "Homeopathy and the Lancet". Evidence-Based Complementary and Alternative Medicine. 3 (1): 145–147. doi:10.1093/ecam/nek007. PMC 1375230. PMID 16550237.
  - Fisher, P.; Chatfield, K.; Mathie, R. (2003). "Homeopathy in childhood asthma". Thorax. 58 (9): 827, author reply 828. PMID 14510008.
  - McCarney, Robert W.; Warner, James; Fisher, Peter; Van Haselen, Robbert (2003). "Homeopathy for dementia". Cochrane Database of Systematic Reviews (1) CD003803. doi:10.1002/14651858.CD003803. PMID 12535487.
  - Dantas, F.; Fisher, P.; Walach, H.; Wieland, F.; Rastogi, D.P.; Teixeira, H.; Koster, D.; Jansen, J.P.; Eizayaga, J.; Alvarez, M.E.P.; Marim, M.; Belon, P.; Weckx, L.L.M. (2007). "A systematic review of the quality of homeopathic pathogenetic trials published from 1945 to 1995". Homeopathy. 96 (1): 4–16. doi:10.1016/j.homp.2006.11.005. PMID 17227742.
