= Michael Dixon (doctor) =

British general practitioner (born 1952)

Sir Michael Dixon KCVO OBE
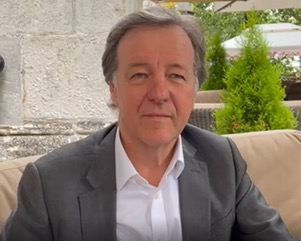
- Dixon in 2025

Head of the Royal Medical Household
- Incumbent
- Assumed office 2022
- Monarch: Charles III
- Preceded by: Huw Thomas

Personal details
- Born: 12 May 1952 (age 74)
- Education: Eton College; University of Oxford; Guy's Hospital Medical School
- Occupation: General practitioner

Sir Michael David Dixon KCVO OBE (born 12 May 1952) is an English general practitioner and current Head of the Royal Medical Household. He is Chair of The College of Medicine and Integrated Health and Visiting Professor at the University of Westminster.

== Early life and education ==
Dixon was born on 12 May 1952. He was educated at Eton College, an all-boys public school (i.e. independent boarding school). He studied at Exeter College, Oxford, graduating from the University of Oxford with a BA degree in psychology and philosophy in 1973 (as per tradition, this was later on promoted to an MA (Oxon) degree). He then studied at Guy's Hospital, graduating with a medical MBBS degree in 1979.

== Career ==
He has worked as an NHS GP at College Surgery in Cullompton for 40 years. In 2007, College Surgery became part of the Culm Valley Centre for Integrated Health and is rated by the Care Quality Commission as "outstanding".

From 1998 to 2015, Dixon was Chair of the NHS Alliance, now known as The Health Creation Alliance, representing primary care commissioners. Its mission was to provide a voice for general practice and its patients in planning local hospital and community services.

He has been active in the commissioning movement since the early 1990s, when he co-founded the Mid Devon Family Doctors Commissioning Group. He sat on the National Executive of the National Association of Commissioning GPs (NACGP), founded in 1993, and was a co-writer of its document "Restoring the Vision" (1997), which was commissioned by the then Minister of Health, Alan Milburn. When NACGP became NHS Alliance in 1998, he was elected chairman and has continued in this role by annual election until he announced his retirement in 2015. He is a frequent speaker and national advisor on GP commissioning and co-author of a number of books and chapters in this area (such as The Locality Commissioning Handbook) and A Practical Guide to Primary Care Groups and Trusts.

His national appointments have included membership of the National Leadership Network for Health and Social Care, the National Stakeholder Forum and National Steering Group for GP Commissioning. He was an Honorary Senior Fellow in Public Policy at HSMC University of Birmingham, and also an Honorary Senior/Lecturer in Integrated Health at the Peninsula Medical School.

Past ministerial appointments include Chair of the NHS LifeCheck Board and Practice Based Commissioning Advisor to Lord Darzi of Denham. He is a past President of the Health Writers Guild and was previously Senior Advisor at the King's Fund and Steering Group member of the King's Fund Enquiry on General Practice.

In 2010, he founded and became Chair of the College of Medicine, which explores the potential of medicine beyond just pills and procedures and how individuals and communities can become more active in their own health and healing. This includes social prescribing, lifestyle interventions and exploring treatments that are not yet regarded as mainstream.

He was a commissioner and health lead for the Healthy Cities Report launched in the House of Lords in 2022 and was appointed to the Health Council of Reform Think Tank involved in its "Reimagining Health Programme".

He was listed in the top ten most influential clinical leaders in the Health Service Journal 2013. He has been listed among Pulse magazine's most influential GPs for several years and was also a medical columnist for SHE Magazine.

== Social prescribing ==
He appointed the first ever "social prescriber" in his Devon NHS practice in 2009 promoting it as an answer to over medicalisation and soaring health costs. Social prescription facilitates patients with a range of social, psychological and physical problems to access a wide range of local interventions and services provided by the voluntary and volunteer sectors and others.

In his own GP practice, he witnessed its potential to help patients with diabetes and pre-diabetes, and this led to his co-founding the National Social Prescribing Network in 2015, which had more than 1,000 members by the spring of 2016 when NHS England appointed him their first National Lead for Social Prescribing.

As the Social Prescribing Movement progressed the National Network called for universal funding and national roll out of Social Prescribing in England, which was later announced by the then Secretary of State for Health in November 2018 with the creation of the National Academy for Social Prescribing. Today he is an Ambassador for the Academy’s Global Social Prescribing Network representing over 30 countries worldwide.

== Complementary medicine ==
Dixon's other main field of interest is complementary medicine. He established the College of Medicine with one of its aims being to become honest broker between the often antagonistic conventional and complementary communities.

Co-author of The Human Effect (Radcliffe Press 2000), he believes in "patient-centred medicine" and the role of the patient in self healing. Reviewing the book, David Short, Emeritus Professor of Clinical Medicine at the University of Aberdeen, writes:

'The authors urge doctors to move beyond the idea of the body as a machine. If doctors do indeed regard their patients in this way, then this book is timely. One cannot help feeling that what is advocated is really a return to best practice of family doctors of an earlier generation. Perhaps the authors recognise this in saying 'what is called for is less of a revolution and more of a revival'.

Dixon describes his approach to medicine in the BBC Radio 4 programme Healthy Visions, which especially focuses on prevention and looking at the whole lives of patients. He argues that it is beneficial to "break down the boundaries" between orthodox and complementary medicine, and argues that an increasing number of GPs are doing so.

In a paper for the British Journal of General Practice, "The physician healer: ancient magic or modern science?", he writes:

it seems that the physician healer is now poised to rise again like a phoenix, not on a wave of nostalgia, but because modern science demands it. Placebo research and psychoneuroimmunology are beginning to clarify a role in which caring is no longer an act of compassion or indulgence but has everything to do with curing or in the preferred modern term 'effectiveness'.

He was the medical director of The Prince's Foundation for Integrated Health, which closed in 2010 after its finance director was arrested for stealing £253,000 from the organisation. Dixon is chair and Founder of The College of Medicine, which opened in 2010 with former Chair of the General Medical Council Sir Graeme Catto as its president.

Dixon has been criticised by professor of complementary medicine and alternative medicine campaigner Edzard Ernst for advocating the use of complementary medicine. Ernst said that the stance of the NHS Alliance on complementary medicine was "misleading to the degree of being irresponsible". Ernst had previously been sympathetic to building a bridge between complementary and mainstream medicine, co-writing an article with Michael Dixon in 1997 on the benefits of such an approach. Ernst and Dixon wrote that:

missed diagnoses by complementary therapists giving patients long term treatments are often cited but in the experience of one of the authors (MD) are extremely rare. It can also cut both ways. A patient was recently referred back to her general practitioner by an osteopath, who was questioning, as it turned out quite correctly, whether her pain was caused by metastates. Good communication between general practitioner and complementary therapist can reduce conflicts and contradictions, which otherwise have the potential to put orthodox medicine and complementary therapy in an either/or situation.

In December 2023, it was reported that Dixon had been appointed by Charles III as Head of the Royal Medical Household a year previously in November 2022. He had previously created and led his medical household as HRH The Prince of Wales since 2009. His position as Head of the Royal Medical Household, which ended in June 2026, was criticised by campaigners against alternative medicine. Dixon remains Personal Doctor to Their Majesties The King (Charles III) and Queen (Camilla).

== Personal life ==
In his free time, Dixon gardens and fishes whenever possible. His wife, Joanna, is a professional artist, and they have three children, two of whom are GPs and the other works in health and science policy.

== Honours and appointments ==
- CVO (2024)
- LVO (2015)
- OBE (2001)
- Former Visiting Professor, University College of London
- Visiting Professor Westminster University
- Former Honorary Senior Fellow, HSMC University of Birmingham
- Former Honorary Senior Lecturer Peninsula Medical School, Exeter
- Medical Advisor to Charles, Prince of Wales (2002–2022)
- Head of The Royal Medical Household (2022–2026)
- Personal Doctor to Their Majesties The King (Charles III) and Queen (Camilla) (2022-)
- KCVO (2026)

== Publications ==
- The Locality Commissioning Handbook (Radcliffe Press 1997)
- The Human Effect (Radcliffe Press, 2000)
- A Practical Guide to Primary Care Groups and Trusts (Radcliffe Press, 2000)
- Practice-based Commissioning: From good idea to effective practice, 2007
- Co-author of many NHS Alliance documents, including "Implementing the Vision" (2000) and "Vision in Practice" (2002), "Breaking Boundaries" (2012), and "Think Big, Act Now" (2014). He has written a number of original research papers mainly covering areas of general practice.
- Time to Heal: Tales of a Country Doctor (Unicorn Publishing Group, 2020)
