= Complementary and Natural Healthcare Council =

UK regulatory body

The Complementary and Natural Healthcare Council (CNHC) is a regulatory body in the United Kingdom which provides a voluntary register of complementary, rather than alternative medicine, therapists. The key purpose of CNHC is to act in the public interest and enable proper public accountability of the complementary therapists that it registers.

The CNHC was founded in 2008 with government funding and support and became fully operational in early 2009. In 2013 it was approved as the holder of an 'Accredited Voluntary Register' by the Professional Standards Authority for Health and Social Care (PSA). In December 2014 it became an 'Accredited Register', for the PSA. The Professional Standards Authority is not concerned whether any of the methodologies used by societies on this scheme have any scientific validity. It regards the question of scientific veracity as a matter of opinion.

== Origins ==
=== The need for regulation ===
In November 2000, the House of Lords Select committee on Science and Technology reported on complementary and alternative medicine and considered the public health policy needs and NHS provision of these treatments. In one of its many areas of consideration, the report considered the needs to provide public protection by regulating practitioners. It noted that those practices that could injure patients were either already statutorily regulated (chiropractic and osteopathy) or were soon to be (herbalism and acupuncture).

The remaining largely placebo based therapies and those without a sound evidence base for their efficacy and robust regulatory systems (e.g. reiki, massage therapy, aromatherapy, yoga and homeopathy), suffered from having a large number of fragmented registration bodies with considerable diversity of standards. The House of Lords found this unacceptable and that "in the best interests of their patients such therapies must each strive to unite under a single voluntary regulatory body".

The House of Lords described the necessary features of an effective voluntary self-regulatory body. These included having a register of members, educational standards, a code of ethics and practice, a public complaints mechanism, and the capacity to represent the whole profession.

=== The Federal Working Group ===
Following publication of the report, the Department of Health (DH) asked The Prince's Foundation for Integrated Health (FIH), a not for profit organisation founded by The Prince of Wales, to facilitate the development of a federal 'umbrella' regulator for these therapies. The Foundation, which is now defunct, promoted the inclusion of non-evidence based alternative therapies into public healthcare in the UK. The process was funded by a DH grant of £900,000 over a three-year period from 2005 to 2008.

On behalf of the FIH, Professor Dame Joan Higgins was asked to be Chair of a Federal Working Group which was to look into setting up what was to become the Complementary and Natural Healthcare Council. Therapies who participated in the Working Group were Alexander technique, aromatherapy, Bowen technique, cranial therapy, homeopathy, massage therapy, naturopathy, nutritional therapy, reflexology, reiki, shiatsu and yoga therapy. Other eligible therapists were aromatherapists, reflexologists and reiki practitioners, although these practices were not represented.

== Structure ==
The Complementary and Natural Healthcare Council is a not-for-profit private limited company made up of three elements:

- Regulatory Council
- Profession Specific Boards
- Professional Committee

The Council has five lay and four registrant members. Each Profession Specific Board has up to four registrants from the relevant profession. The Professional Committee is a pool of lay people from which investigating, conduct & competence and Health Panels are drawn.

=== CNHC Code of Practise supports Evidence-Based Approach ===
The CNHC’s Code of Conduct, Performance and Ethics states:

15. You must follow CNHC guidelines in relation to advertising your services

Any advertising you undertake in relation to your professional activities must be accurate. Advertisements must not be misleading, false, unfair or exaggerated. You must not claim that your personal skills, equipment or facilities are better than anyone else’s.

If you are involved in advertising or promoting any other product or service, you must make sure that you use your knowledge, healthcare skills, qualifications and experience in an accurate and professionally responsible way. You must not make or support unjustifiable statements relating to particular products or services. Any potential financial rewards to you should be made explicit and play no part at all in your advice or recommendations of products and services that you give to patients, clients and users.

== Progress since start-up ==
In December 2008, CNHC stated on their website that they hoped to have 10,000 practitioners registered with them by the end of 2009. This was later amended without comment to 4,000 by Spring 2010. However, by August 2009 a total of only about 500 registrations had been made in four disciplines: Massage Therapy, Nutritional Therapy, Aromatherapy and (from 24 August) Reflexology.

By February 2011 practitioners in eleven disciplines were eligible, but according to the organisation's website the total number of registrants was still less than 4,000.

Lack of enthusiasm for the CNHC among practitioners may be partly ascribed to the fact that at present anyone may legally practise in the UK without qualifications as a reflexologist, aromatherapist, homeopath, naturopath, nutritional therapist, acupuncturist, etc., and that voluntary registration by the CHNC will make no difference to this.

== Funding ==
In response to a Freedom of Information request, the Department of Health has confirmed that since the CNHC was set up the DH has provided funding as follows: £293,496 in 2007/8/9 (including start up costs), £409,300 in 2009/10 and £127,748 in 2010/11

Request was made for funding to be continued but this was dependent on satisfactory progress having been made, and as this was not the case official funding ceased in March 2011.

The CNHC publishes details of the number of registrants on its website, both the total and the number for each of the 18 therapies. While these are certainly lower than the target of 10,000 set in 2007 income from fees is currently sufficient to more than cover running costs.

== Criticism ==
=== CNHC to tighten up on unjustified claims for which there is no evidence-base ===
Following complaints submitted by Simon Perry, a blogger and member of Leicester Sceptics in the Pub, regarding 14 reflexologists claiming to treat specific diseases without any credible evidence, Maggie Dunn, CEO of CNHC, has said that they will tighten up on therapists making unjustified claims for which they have no evidence. CNHC reviewed the claims made by the reflexologists against the Advertising Standards Authority (ASA) guidelines - and told the reflexologists to remove their claims. In a personal communication to Simon Perry from Maggie Dunn, the CNHC’s Chief Executive Officer, CNHC said that in the future:

- CNHC will tell practitioners to remove claims they cannot justify.
- CNHC will conduct a review of evidence base for regulated therapies.
- CNHC will contact all registrants to instruct them not to make claims without justification.
- CNHC will contact complementary health course providers and authors to instruct them not to make claims without justification.
- this is to cover all promotional materials and all interactions with the client.

However CNHC has made no public statement in this regard - possibly because many therapists will not want their public and private claims for efficacy to be regulated. The CNHC has attracted criticism, mainly for its role in appearing to legitimize what critics regard as quackery and for its efforts to promote alternate therapies which are often of dubious or unproven efficacy. It is satirized by skeptics as "OfQuack", mimicking other bodies such as OfCom. "How does a regulator decide what is good practice and what is charlatanry when none of it has peer-reviewed, scientific evidence that it works?... Professor Michael Baum protested that 'this is like licensing a witches' brew as a medicine so long as the batwings are sterile'... It matters that Newsnight found homeopaths advising patients visiting malaria areas not to take anti-malarial drugs. And that patients are told not to give their children the MMR jab." Polly Toynbee, The Guardian.

Private Eye magazine argued that the council had a conflict of interests between promoting and regulating alternative medicine: "Everyone would say that propagandists cannot be regulators because they cannot be trusted to act in the public interest." It quoted Edzard Ernst, professor of complementary medicine at the University of Exeter, as saying: "This is ridiculous. It really is a farce. All they will need to prove is that [practitioners] are following an established technique they believe to be appropriate. It's a ludicrous system."

Private Eye and The Economist reported that critics have nicknamed the council 'OfQuack'. Private Eye quoted a joke slogan, 'OfQuack - making quacks look professional since 2008'.

In January 2009, an online petition was started at the UK Government Petition website, asking for stricter requirements on efficacy and safety as a condition of certification. An official response to this was posted, but simply reiterated the terms of the current requirements. However, in response to the point made by the petitioners and others, the CNHC has now amended its website, deleting its original statement that regulation by them gives a guarantee of the efficacy of the procedures carried out by their registrants. In addition to the medical criticism, CNHC have also been censured by the British Standards Institute for use of their trademarked term "kitemark", and have also been criticised for poor openness and an inconsistent approach to data protection. It has, to date, failed to register more than a tiny proportion of the tens of thousands of CAM practitioners in the UK; it is argued that it is failing in its stated aim to protect the public against incompetence or malpractice in the disciplines it claims to regulate, let alone in those - homeopathy for example - whose practitioners have no interest in the CNHC and claim to regulate themselves. While there has been considerable criticism of CNHC with regard to "quack" therapies their Code of Practise may support an evidence-based approach.
