= Big Pharma conspiracy theories =

Conspiracy theories about the pharmaceutical industry

Big Pharma conspiracy theories are conspiracy theories that claim that pharmaceutical companies as a whole, especially big corporations, act in dangerously secretive and sinister ways that harm patients. This includes concealing effective treatments, perhaps even to the point of intentionally causing and/or worsening a wide range of diseases, in the pursuit of higher profits and/or other nefarious goals. The general public supposedly lives in a state of ignorance, according to such claims.

Some theories have incorporated the assertions that natural, alternative remedies to multiple health struggles are being suppressed, that medications for the treatment of HIV/AIDS are ineffective and harmful, that an effective cure for all cancers has been discovered but concealed from the public, that vaccines for COVID-19 are ineffective, and that alternatively understood cures exist for COVID-19 itself. In most cases, the conspiracy theorists have blamed pharmaceutical companies' search for increased profit margins. A range of authors have shown these claims to be false, though some of these authors nevertheless maintain that other criticisms of the pharmaceutical industry are legitimate.

== History and definition ==
According to Steven Novella, the use of terminology such as Big Pharma has come to connote a demonized form of the pharmaceutical industry, described in an emotional fashion, which exists disconnected from the real-life complexity of business history. Professor of writing Robert Blaskiewicz has written that conspiracy theorists use the term Big Pharma as "shorthand for an abstract entity comprising corporations, regulators, NGOs, politicians, and often physicians, all with a finger in the trillion-dollar prescription pharmaceutical pie".

According to Blaskiewicz, the Big Pharma conspiracy theory has four classic traits: first, the assumption that the conspiracy is perpetrated by a small malevolent cabal; secondly, the belief that the public at large is ignorant of the truth; thirdly, that its believers treat lack of evidence as evidence; and finally, that the arguments deployed in support of the theory are irrational, misconceived, or otherwise mistaken.

In the 1970s and 1980s, the conspiracy theory was promoted by Ann Wigmore who held that diseases, including cancer and HIV/AIDS, could be effectively treated with a raw food diet. In this context, Wigmore believed that the pharmaceutical industry was part of a conspiracy to keep the population at large ill.

André Picard wrote in 2009 that the internet had radically changed the nature of popular scientific discourse from being infrequent and deferential to widespread and conspiracy based: scientific debate was often supplanted by dismissal of science as being "part of some vast conspiracy". In the conspiracist world view, "Doctors, nurses, pharmacists, pharmacologists, biochemists, immunologists, geneticists and journalists are not to be trusted. They are all on the take".

Research in Italy in 2016 found that nearly half the adult population believed that pharmaceutical companies hinder the development of effective medications to heal serious diseases, which according to the authors is a conspiracy theory, and that such beliefs were negatively correlated to mainstream religion while having anti-science and anti-elitism bases.

== Manifestations ==
The conspiracy theory has a variety of different manifestations. Each has different narratives, but they always cast "Big Pharma" as the villain of the piece.

=== HIV/AIDS ===
Since the beginning of the AIDS epidemic, many dangerous hypotheses have been put forward to explain the origin and nature of the disease. One conspiracy theory claims that AIDS was created by the US government to control and/or wipe out gays and African Americans. Also, there is a cure for HIV/AIDS that is withheld from the poor. Other theories say that although the virus is harmful, the risks of antiretroviral drugs outweigh the benefits. The drugs are said to be toxins that are spread by doctors who have been corrupted by the pharmaceutical industry.

In a 2006 column for Harper's Magazine, journalist Celia Farber claimed that the antiretroviral drug nevirapine was part of a conspiracy by the "scientific-medical complex" to spread toxic drugs. Farber said that AIDS is not caused by HIV and that nevirapine had been unethically administered to pregnant women in clinical trials, leading to a fatality. Farber's theories and claims were refuted by scientists, but, according to researcher Seth Kalichman, the resulting publicity represented a breakthrough moment for AIDS denialism.

Misinformation surrounding HIV/AIDs research is extremely pervasive around many communities. Research looking at HIV connected conspiracy beliefs has documented wary and distrust towards pharmaceutical companies as well as current government institutions.

The former president of South Africa, Thabo Mbeki, influenced by AIDS denier Peter Duesberg, introduced policies that denied treatments to AIDS patients. According to estimates this led, among other things, to more than 300,000 people dying prematurely.

=== Cure for cancer ===
A recurring conspiracy theory claims that the pharmaceutical industry has a cure for cancer, but suppresses it so that they can continue to make billions on the "ineffective" treatments currently given to cancer patients. This was believed by 27% of the American public according to a 2005 survey. The argument is that pharmaceutical companies are slowing down research for a comprehensive cure for cancer by developing high-profit, single-purpose treatments rather than focusing on a supposed cure-all for all cancers.

Following the crash of Voepass Linhas Aéreas Flight 2283 in August 2024, social media posts appeared naming Leonardo Ferreira, a cancer researcher, as one of the passengers. The Brazilian College of Radiology and Imaging Diagnosis published an obituary and conspiracy theories spread about how Big Pharma had engineered the supposed death of somebody close to finding a breakthrough cancer cure. Ferreira confirmed he was not dead; nobody of that name was on the aircraft's passenger list.

=== Vaccines ===
The idea that vaccines were created by the pharmaceutical industry to make people sick, or to alter human DNA, has been around for a long time but has been given new life during the COVID-19 pandemic.

The conspiracy theory that vaccines make people autistic can be traced back to a study published in The Lancet in February 1998. Andrew Wakefield claimed that there is a link between MMR vaccine and autism. The study later turned out to be fraudulent, and led to Wakefield being struck off the medical register. The Lancet also withdrew the article. Although a number of studies have disproved the link between autism and vaccines, the conspiracy theory has survived in various forms, and it has been spread by, among others, Donald Trump.

Other conspiracy theories suggest that vaccines are used to implant microchips for surveillance and thought control. Among others, the Bill & Melinda Gates Foundation has been accused of wanting to microchip the world's population through global vaccination programs.

=== COVID-19 ===
The COVID-19 pandemic is surrounded by a wide range of conspiracy theories, including the postulation that COVID-19 does not exist at all or is just a mild flu.

During the pandemic, there was a surge of conspiracies about the origins of the disease, such as claiming that the virus was created in a laboratory in China. However, strong evidence suggests that the disease-causing virus, SARS-CoV-2, is a naturally evolved strain belonging to the coronavirus subfamily.

The 2020 video Plandemic: The Hidden Agenda Behind Covid-19, promotes the conspiracist claim that vaccines are "a money-making enterprise that causes medical harm". In the video, former research scientist Judy Mikovits spread the notion that "Big Pharma", Bill Gates and the World Health Organization led a conspiracy, in which they acted together as a "circular cabal" with the aim of killing Americans. The video was released on May 4, 2020, and garnered millions of views, making it one of the most widespread pieces of COVID-19 misinformation.

=== Natural cures ===
In the book Natural Cures "They" Don't Want You to Know About, author Kevin Trudeau claims that there are all-natural cures for serious illnesses including cancer, herpes, arthritis, AIDS, acid reflux disease, diabetes, multiple sclerosis, lupus, chronic fatigue syndrome, attention deficit hyperactivity disorder, muscular dystrophy, and that these are all being deliberately hidden and suppressed from the public by the Food and Drug Administration, the Federal Trade Commission, and major food and drug companies. The book has been the focus of much controversy since its publication in 2005, with widespread allegations of fraud.

== Reception ==
A common claim among proponents of the conspiracy theory is that pharmaceutical companies suppress negative research about their drugs by financially pressuring researchers and journals. Skeptic Benjamin Radford, while conceding there is "certainly a grain of truth" to these claims, notes that there are in fact papers critical of specific drugs published in top journals on a regular basis. A prominent example noted by Radford is a systematic review published in the British Medical Journal showing that paracetamol is ineffective for lower back pain and has minimal effectiveness for osteoarthritis.

In his 2012 book Bad Pharma, Ben Goldacre heavily criticises the pharmaceutical industry but rejects any conspiracy theories. He argues that the problems are "perpetrated by ordinary people, but many of them may not even know what they've done".

Steven Novella writes that while the pharmaceutical industry has a number of aspects which justly deserve criticism, the "demonization" of it is both cynical and intellectually lazy. He goes on to consider that overblown attacks on "Big Pharma" actually let the pharmaceutical industry "off the hook" since they distract from and tarnish more considered criticisms. He has also written, on Skepticblog, about the general misunderstanding and sensationalizing of cancer research that typically accompanies a conspiratorial mindset. He points out that cures for cancer, rather than being hidden, are not the cures they are initially touted to be by the media and either result in a dead end, further research goals, or a decrease in the mortality rate for a specific type of cancer.

Dave Roos and Oliver Childs have criticized the idea that holding back a cure for cancer would result in more profit than presenting one. Dina Fine Maron further notes that this view largely ignores the fact that cancer is not a single disease but instead many, and the fact that large strides have been made in the fight against cancer.

In 2016, David Robert Grimes published a research paper elaborating about the mathematical non-viability of conspiracy theories in general. He estimated that if there were a big pharma conspiracy to conceal a cure for cancer, it would be exposed after about 3.2 years due to the sheer number of people required to keep it secret.

== See also ==
- Bad Pharma, a 2012 book by British physician and academic Ben Goldacre
- Big Pharma, a 2006 book by British journalist Jacky Law
- Evil corporation
- Homeopathy
- List of conspiracy theories
- List of topics characterized as pseudoscience
- Lobbying
  - Pharmaceutical lobby
  - Pharmaceutical marketing
- Vaccine hesitancy
- Vaccine resistance activism
