= Trick or Treatment? =

2008 book by Singh and Ernst

Trick or Treatment? Alternative Medicine on Trial
- Cover of the first edition
- Author: Simon Singh, Edzard Ernst
- Language: English
- Subject: Alternative medicine
- Publisher: Bantam Press
- Publication date: 2008
- Publication place: United Kingdom
- Media type: Print
- Pages: 352
- ISBN: 0-593-06129-2
- OCLC: 190777228

Trick or Treatment? Alternative Medicine on Trial (North American title: Trick or Treatment: The Undeniable Facts about Alternative Medicine) is a 2008 book by Simon Singh and Edzard Ernst. The book evaluates the scientific evidence for alternative medicines such as acupuncture, homeopathy, herbal medicine, and chiropractic, and briefly covers 36 other treatments. It finds that the scientific evidence for these alternative treatments is generally lacking. The authors concluded that homeopathy is merely a placebo.

Although Trick or Treatment presents evidence that acupuncture, chiropractic and herbal remedies have limited efficacy for certain ailments, the authors conclude that the dangers of these treatments outweigh any potential benefits. Such potential risks outlined by the authors are contamination or unexpected interactions between components in the case of herbal medicine, risk of infection in the case of acupuncture and the potential for chiropractic manipulation of the neck to cause delayed stroke.

The book, dedicated in an ironic fashion to Prince Charles, is critical of his advocacy of alternative medicine and the actions of his now-defunct The Prince's Foundation for Integrated Health.

== Contents ==
The book contains six chapters:

How do you determine the truth?

This chapter describes the methods and history of clinical trials, such as the trial to determine a proper treatment for scurvy by James Lind and the story of Florence Nightingale. James Lind was a British physician who pioneered naval hygiene. He recommended that citrus fruit and lemon juice should be included in the diets of seamen to eradicate the illness of scurvy. Lind was able to come to the conclusion that these remedies may reduce this particular illness through the various clinical trials he performed that were successful. Florence Nightingale is another example used in the novel as someone who practiced the scientific medicine and evidence based medicine as she pioneered the profession of nursing.

The truth about acupuncture

This chapter discusses the evidence surrounding acupuncture, a form of alternative medicine in which acupuncturists place needles in the body for the purpose of blocking Ch'i meridians throughout the body, thus encouraging full health. The authors examine the recent history of acupuncture and several various trials of the technique. The authors conclude that acupuncture is essentially a placebo.

The truth about homeopathy

This chapter discusses the evidence surrounding homeopathy, an alternative medicine technique which consists of finding a substance (which causes symptoms similar to the condition needing to be treated in a healthy person), then diluting that substance to an extreme degree. The chapter examines the history of homeopathy and reviews various trials regarding the technique, especially the trial done by Jacques Benveniste, a French researcher. The authors conclude that homeopathy is a placebo. The authors offered a £10,000 prize for anyone who could prove homeopathy was effective.

The truth about chiropractic therapy

This chapter discusses the evidence surrounding chiropractic, an alternative medicine technique which aims to cure illness by manipulating the spine, based on the theory that almost all conditions and diseases are caused by misaligned vertebrae in the spine, blocking the body's vital force. The history of chiropractic, as well as several of the trials on chiropractic are described. The authors conclude that there is no evidence to support most of chiropractic's claims. However, the authors state that chiropractic might be beneficial in certain limited situations concerning back pain. As well, the authors find that chiropractic can be very dangerous, especially when it comes to the manipulation of the neck, and state that patients should "try conventional treatments before turning to a chiropractor for back pain. They are generally cheaper than spinal manipulation and just as likely to be effective."

The truth about herbal medicine

This chapter discusses the evidence surrounding herbal medicine, such as the use of St. John's Wort and Aloe vera. The authors conclude that several herbal medicines can be effective to treat illness, while others, such as bilberry, chamomile, and ginseng, are ineffective.

Does the truth matter?

This chapter discusses the state of alternative medicine in society, focusing on Prince Charles's endorsements of alternative medicine. It is critical of the actions of his now-defunct The Prince's Foundation for Integrated Health.

== Reception ==
In 2008 and 2009, Trick or Treatment received mostly favorable reviews for its clear and thorough writing although several reviewers were critical that the book lacked acknowledgement of problems present in conventional medicine.

Olivia Laing, writing for The Guardian, said "Singh and Ernst are scientists and their mainly dismissive conclusions are based on extensive, though bizarrely unfootnoted, research. In tones of quiet fury, they demolish the claims of acupuncture, chiropractic therapy, . . . and homeopathy." Laing criticized the book for a lack of "acknowledgement of the problems of funding adequate trials" and "discussion of the equivalent risks and inadequacies of conventional medicine" such as the side effects of pharmaceutical drugs.

In a review for Nature, Toby Murcott described the book as "thoroughly researched and clearly written", where the authors, in discussing the available randomized clinical trials for each of four treatments, "make repeated claims that they provide the truth, and have even included this word in the title of every chapter. The balance of evidence from randomized controlled trials supports their arguments, but the authors are not tendering a disprovable hypothesis." Murcott expressed concern that the authors' sense of certainty "mirrors that of the proponents of alternative therapies, leaving each position as entrenched as ever."

Harriet Hall, in reviewing Trick or Treatment, emphasized that Ernst's views were worthy of "special credibility" as he had previously prescribed homeopathic remedies and was supportive of alternative treatments that were proven to work. Hall said Ernst "accepts claims about herbs that many of us reject" and has "demonstrated his ability to change his mind and follow the evidence."

In a review of the book for Complementary Medicine Research, John Kapp said that although he did not agree with their conclusion, Ernst and Singh "deserve praise for bringing a vital subject to the attention of the public in a clear and readable way." Kapp was critical that the authors "castigate alternative medicine for not doing more clinical trials, but fail to acknowledge the cost" and said they fail to address the flawed nature of some drug trials in conventional medicine, pointing towards the 2004 removal of Vioxx from the market as a recent example.

Writing for the British Journal of General Practice, Jeremy Swayne (former dean of the Faculty of Homeopathy) said the book was "thorough and clever" and that it "provides excellent counsel about the shortcomings of CAM (and there are many, if you take the whole nebulous field into consideration), and its susceptibility to popular and commercial exploitation. But a recurring lack of truthfulness is the lack of the perspective that would have been provided by relating these to comparable problems in conventional medicine."

Donald Marcus reviewed the book for The New England Journal of Medicine and found the writing to be "clear and vivid" with historical anecdotes that "provide a valuable perspective on the subject." Marcus said Trick or Treatment "meets the need for a current, evidence-based survey of alternative therapies to balance the widespread misinformation about them."

Writing for The Daily Telegraph, Katie Owen and Sally Cousins described the book as "a clearly written, scrupulously scientific examination of the health claims of key areas of alternative medicine: acupuncture, homeopathy, chiropractic therapy and herbal medicine. The results are stark. In no case, apart from in some limited ways in herbal medicine, do any of these 'therapies' work. On the contrary, they can be life-threatening."

== Subsequent libel case and freedom of speech ==
Singh was sued for libel by the British Chiropractic Association (BCA) for comments he wrote in a column in The Guardian about the book. In 2010, after two years, the BCA dropped the case after the Court of Appeal found that Singh was expressing an opinion, rather than stating facts. The presiding judges commented that "this litigation has almost certainly had a chilling effect on public debate which might otherwise have assisted potential patients to make informed choices about the possible use of chiropractic".

== See also ==
- Suckers: How alternative medicine makes fools of us all, 2008 book by Rose Shapiro
