= The Weight-Loss Cure "They" Don't Want You to Know About =

2007 book by Kevin Trudeau

The Weight-Loss Cure "They" Don't Want You To Know About
- Author: Kevin Trudeau
- Language: English
- Subject: Weight loss
- Genre: Self-help, Alternative medicine
- Publisher: Alliance Publishing
- Publication date: 1 April 2007
- Pages: 256
- ISBN: 978-0-9787851-0-9
- OCLC: 122341864
- Dewey Decimal: 613.25 22
- LC Class: RM222.2 .T78 2007

The Weight Loss Cure "They" Don't Want You to Know About is a weight loss book written by salesman and convicted fraudster Kevin Trudeau. It was released in April 2007 by Alliance Publishing.

== About ==
For making false claims about the book in his television infomercials, Trudeau was fined by the Federal Trade Commission and, in 2013, convicted of criminal contempt of court, for which he was later sentenced to ten years in prison. The book repeats a refuted claim to change activity in the hypothalamus, linked to the pituitary gland, with the intention to control hunger and regulation of fat cells, by using herbal supplements and repeated use of the hCG hormone; this claim was originally made by Albert T. W. Simeons in the 1950s. Simeons' results were not reproducible by other researchers and in 1976 in response to complaints the FDA required Simeons and his followers to include the following disclaimer on all advertisements:

These weight reduction treatments include the injection of HCG, a drug which has not been approved by the Food and Drug Administration as safe and effective in the treatment of obesity or weight control. There is no substantial evidence that HCG increases weight loss beyond that resulting from caloric restriction, that it causes a more attractive or "normal" distribution of fat, or that it decreases the hunger and discomfort associated with calorie-restrictive diets.

— 1976 FDA-mandated disclaimer for HCG diet advertisements

The book follows up his two other bestselling but critically panned books, Natural Cures "They" Don't Want You to Know About and More Natural Cures Revealed: Previously Censored Brand Name Products That Cure Disease. Weight Loss Cure has appeared on the bestseller's lists of the Wall Street Journal, USA Today, Publishers Weekly, and The New York Times.

== Legal issues ==
The FTC filed a contempt of court action against Trudeau and the companies that market his book alleging that Trudeau is in contempt of a 2004 court order by "deceptively claiming in his infomercials that the book being advertised establishes a weight-loss protocol that is 'easy' to follow". The action was filed in the U.S. District Court for the Northern District of Illinois on September 17, 2007. According to a FTC Press Release, Trudeau claims that the weight loss plan outlined in the book is easy, can be done at home, and allows readers to eat anything they want. When consumers buy the book, they find that it describes a complex plan that requires intense dieting, daily injections of a prescribed drug that is not easily obtainable, and lifelong dietary restrictions.

On November 16, 2007, Trudeau was found in contempt of the 2004 court order for making "patently false" claims in his weight loss book. U.S. District Court Judge Robert W. Gettleman ruled that Trudeau “clearly misrepresents in his advertisements the difficulty of the diet described in his book, and by doing so, he has misled thousands of consumers.” A penalty will be determined at a later hearing. In October 2008, Trudeau was fined more than $5 million and banned from infomercials for three years for continuing to make fraudulent claims pertaining to the book.

Complaints about Trudeau's weight loss system and business practices can be found at the Consumer Affairs website. In summary, the complaints tend to refer to a problem of unsubscribing from the website and its monthly fees as well as the inability to follow the protocol, detailed by Trudeau, in the United States due to product availability and legal reasons.

== Book diet plan ==
The book's protocols are similar to those developed by British endocrinologist Albert T. W. Simeons in the 1950s. The book describes a multi-month, 3-phase plan that involves changing to all organic foods, with repeated colonic cleansing and liver detoxification, followed by a 2nd-phase period of daily use of human chorionic gonadotropin (hCG), typically injections, under the direction of a healthcare provider or doctor. The use of hCG in men has been found to increase testosterone, which is linked to muscle growth; however, in women, hCG does not produce any consistent or biologically significant increase in testosterone. For men, hCG can have some potential side-effects, including gynecomastia, water retention, increase in sex drive, mood alterations, headaches, and high blood pressure.

In Phase 3, use of hCG stops, but food continues to be 100% organic. Other recommended activities include walking an hour a day or more, eating organic grapefruit, and doing breathing exercises. Scheduled doctor visits, buying organic foods and hCG can be very expensive for the average consumer, but wealthy people have paid to follow the plan, and the plan might work for people who can afford it. According to an analysis by Carrie Poppy of Skeptical Inquirer, the weight loss plan would cost the user up to $18,000 if followed to the letter.

As early as 1962, the Journal of the American Medical Association warned against the Simeons Diet. The FTC ordered clinics and promoters of the Simeons Diet and hCG to cease making false claims about the effectiveness of hCG and its approval status by the FDA for weight loss. Clinical research trials published by the Journal of the American Medical Association and the American Journal of Clinical Nutrition have shown that hCG is ineffective as a weight-loss aid.
