= Donald Barrett =

Donald Barrett may refer to:

- Donald Barrett (businessman), American businessman
- Donald Barrett (musician) (born 1978), American musician and drummer
- Don Barrett (1917–1973), Australian planter and politician in Papua and New Guinea
