= Medical Household =

British royal household unit

The Medical Household is the medical part of the Royal Household of the Sovereign of the United Kingdom.

== Overview ==
Current roles include a Personal Doctor to the King and Queen, Physician to the King, a Serjeant Surgeon, Apothecaries to the King, Occulist to the King, Dentist to the King, Orthopaedic Surgeon to the King and Surgeon Gynaecologist to the Queen.

There are also a number of appointments of physicians and surgeons to other members of the Royal Household. These include Apothecaries to all the Royal Households at Buckingham Palace, Windsor, Sandringham, Balmoral, Palace of Holyrood and Highgrove. A travelling physician accompanies Their Majesties on overseas tours.

Medical arrangements at Buckingham Palace are overseen by a Chief Nursing Officer.

Parity of respect is an important principle underlying the Household's work, with GPs, specialists, nurses and allied professionals working as equals within an integrated team.

== Honorary positions ==
Eminent physicians and surgeons may be appointed to honorary positions in the Medical Household from the British Armed Forces and in the Commonwealth.

With a ruling King, these titles are shared with those held by functioning Physician to the King:

- King's Honorary Surgeon (KHS)
- King's Honorary Dental Surgeon (KHDS)
- King's Honorary Physician (KHP)
- King's Honorary Nursing Sister (KHNS)
- King's Honorary Physicians (Civil) (KHPC)

With a Queen-Regnant, these titles are shared with those held by functioning Physician to the Queen:

- Queen's Honorary Surgeon (QHS)
- Queen's Honorary Dental Surgeon (QHDS)
- Queen's Honorary Physician (QHP)
- Queen's Honorary Nursing Sister (QHNS)
- Queen's Honorary Physicians (Civil) (QHPC)

== List of Heads of the Medical Household ==
The Head of the Medical Household was first appointed in 1973.

- 1973-1981: Sir Richard Bayliss, KCVO MD FRCP MRCS
- 1981-1989: Sir John Batten, KCVO MD FRCP
- 1989-1993: Sir Anthony Dawson, KCVO MD FRCP
- 1993-2005: Sir Richard Thompson, KCVO DM PRCP
- 2005-2014: Professor Sir John Cunningham, KCVO BM BCh MA DM FRCP
- 2014-2022: Professor Sir Huw Thomas, KCVO MBBS MA PhD
- 2022-2026: Sir Michael Dixon, KCVO OBE MA FRCP FRCGP
- Since 2026: Professor Richard Leach, LVO MD FRCP
