= College of Medicine =

College of Medicine may refer to:

- Medical school
- The College of Medicine (UK), a British healthcare lobby group
- Baylor College of Medicine, located in the Texas Medical Center in Houston, Texas, US, a health sciences university
