= Kevin Trudeau =

American fraudster and pseudoscientist

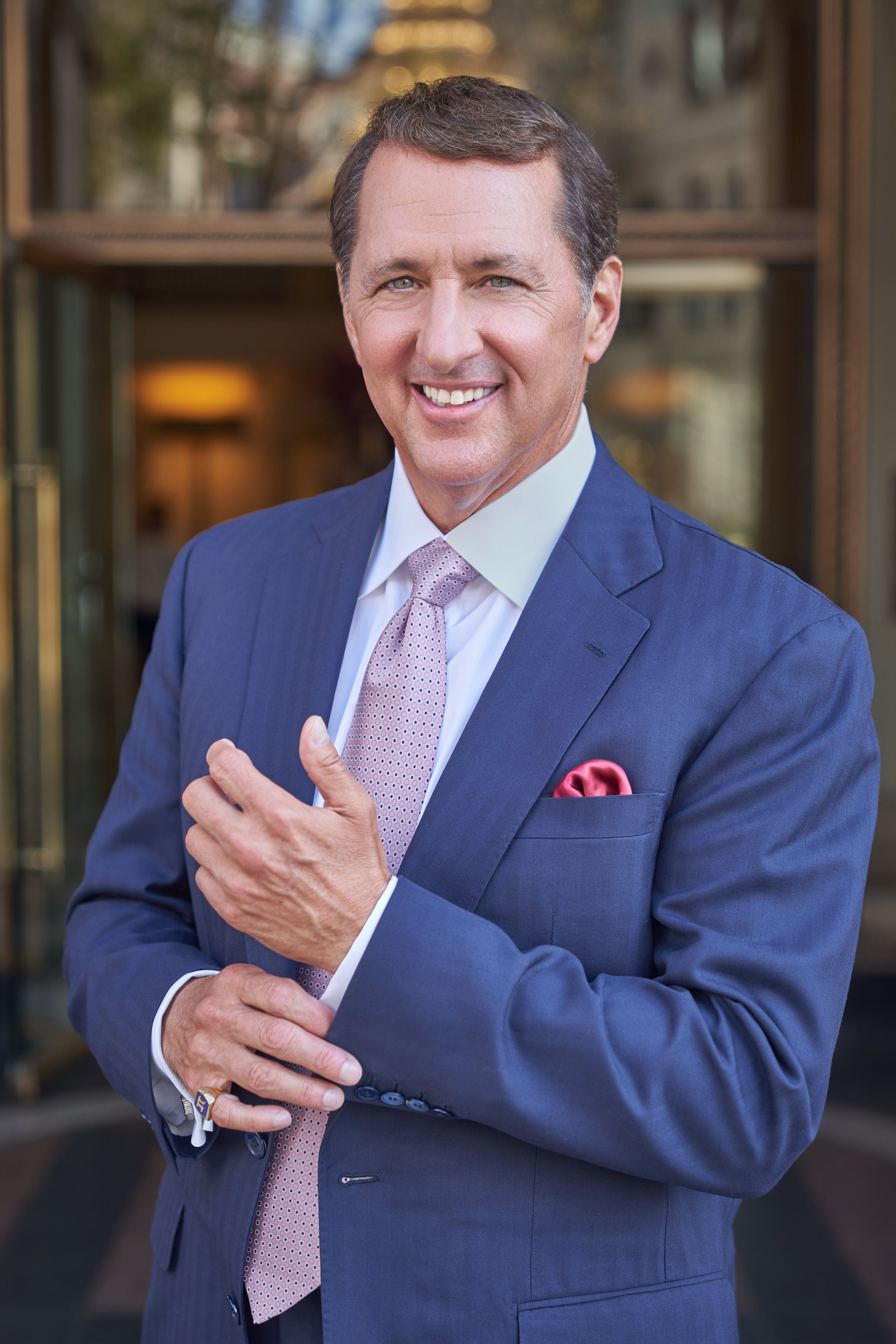
- Trudeau in 2022
- Born: 1962 or 1963 (age 63–64)
- Occupations: Author; television personality
- Known for: Promoting alternative medicine and questionable diet and financial remedies; Founding the International Pool Tour
- Spouses: Oleksandra Polozhentseva (divorced); Kristine Dorow (m. 2007, annulled); Natalya Babenko (m. 2008; ann. 2022)
- Criminal charges: Fraud, larceny and contempt of court; Regulatory settlements with the FTC and eight state attorneys general for false claims and misleading representations
- Website: www.kevintrudeau.com

Kevin Trudeau (/truːˈdoʊ/; born 1962 or 1963) is an American author, salesman, and television personality, who has been convicted of fraud, larceny, and contempt of court, and is also known for promotion of his books and resulting legal cases involving the US Federal Trade Commission. His late-night infomercials, which promoted unsubstantiated health, diet, and financial advice, earned him a fortune but resulted in civil and criminal penalties for fraud, larceny, and contempt of court. He has been called a promoter of "quackery" by astronomer and science blogger Phil Plait, and his book and other media comprise what the American Association for the Advancement of Science has called Trudeau's "snake oil empire".

In the early 1990s, Trudeau was convicted of larceny and credit card fraud. In 2007, he was accused of grossly misrepresenting the contents of his book, The Weight-Loss Cure "They" Don't Want You to Know About. In a 2004 settlement, he agreed to pay a $500,000 fine and cease marketing all products except his books, which are protected under the First Amendment. In 2011, he was fined $37.6 million for violating the 2004 settlement, and ordered to post a $2 million bond before engaging in any future infomercial advertising.

In 2013, facing consequences for non-payment of the $37 million judgment, Trudeau filed for bankruptcy protection. His claims of insolvency were challenged by FTC lawyers, who maintained that he was hiding money in shell companies, and cited examples of continued lavish spending, such as $359 for a haircut. In November 2013, Trudeau was convicted of criminal contempt, and was sentenced to 10 years in federal prison in March 2014. The Chicago Tribune reported in April 2014 that infomercials starring Trudeau and promoting his books continued to air regularly on United States television stations even though he was in jail at the time. Trudeau left federal custody in 2022 after 8 years, after which the FTC continued to pursue the unpaid $37 million fine.

== Early life ==
Trudeau grew up in Lynn, Massachusetts, the adopted son of Robert and Mary Trudeau. His birth mother was Jewish. He attended St. Mary's High School in Lynn, where he was voted "Most Likely to Succeed" by the class of 1981.

== Career ==
After high school Trudeau became a used car salesman, then joined the seminar circuit, selling memory improvement techniques. In 1990 he pleaded guilty to depositing $80,000 in worthless checks and impersonating a physician, but served, he said, fewer than 30 days. In 1991, he pleaded guilty to 11 counts of credit card fraud and spent two years in federal prison.

After his release in 1993, Trudeau joined a multi-level marketing firm, Nutrition for Life. The firm was successful until the Attorney General of Illinois charged that it was running a pyramid scheme. Trudeau and Nutrition for Life settled cases brought by the state of Illinois, and seven other U.S. states, for US$185,000.

Next, Trudeau produced and appeared in a series of late-night television infomercial broadcasts throughout North America. They promoted a range of products, including health aids, dietary supplements (such as coral calcium), baldness remedies, addiction treatments, memory-improvement courses, reading-improvement programs, and real estate investment strategies. The FTC took regulatory action against Trudeau, alleging that his broadcasts contained unsubstantiated claims and misrepresentations. In 1998, he was fined. In 2004, he settled a contempt-of-court action arising out of the same cases by agreeing to a settlement that included both payments of a $2 million fine and a ban on further use of infomercials to promote any product other than publications protected by the First Amendment.

In 2004, Trudeau began writing books and promoting them with infomercials in the U.S. The first book he published was a medical guide titled Natural Cures "They" Don't Want You to Know About, which was published in 2005. The book was criticized for containing no natural cures. Trudeau claimed he was not able to include them because of threats by the FTC. The book became a bestseller selling 5 million copies.

Two years later, Trudeau published a second medical book titled More Natural Cures Revealed: Previously Censored Brand Name Products That Cure Disease. According to Trudeau, the book identifies brand name products that will cure myriad illnesses. Trudeau's books claim that animals in the wild rarely develop degenerative conditions like cancer or Alzheimer's disease, and that many diseases are caused not by viruses or bacteria, but rather by an imbalance in vital energy. Science writer Christopher Wanjek critiqued and rejected many of these claims in his July 25, 2006 LiveScience.com health column.

Trudeau went on to publish The Weight-Loss Cure "They" Don't Want You to Know About and Debt Cures "They" Don't Want You to Know About. His writing has been commercially successful although not factual. In September 2005, Natural Cures was listed in the New York Times as the number-one-selling nonfiction book in the United States for 25 weeks.

Trudeau launched a self-titled Internet radio talk show in February 2009 which also aired on several small radio stations consisting of mostly brokered programming.

== Personal life ==
Trudeau has been married at least three times. His first wife was Oleksandra Polozhentseva, a Ukrainian immigrant. His second union, in 2007, was to Kristine Dorow, a Norwegian student whom he met in London, and ended in annulment after four months. Dorow said that her prenuptial agreement with Trudeau obligated her to reach a certain level in Scientology, which Trudeau has "dabbled in over the years." In 2008, he married Natalya Babenko, another Ukrainian, who filed for marriage annulment based on fraud and had it granted by Los Angeles Superior Court in November 2022.

== Publications ==
=== Natural Cures "They" Don't Want You to Know About ===
In 2004, Trudeau self-published his book Natural Cures "They" Don't Want You to Know About, in which he made a number of unsubstantiated claims—for example, that sunlight does not cause cancer, sunscreen is one of the major causes of skin cancer, and that AIDS was a hoax devised as an excuse to stimulate medication usage. Trudeau further suggested—again without documentation—that various "natural cures" for serious illnesses, including cancer, herpes, arthritis, AIDS, acid reflux disease, various phobias, depression, obesity, diabetes, multiple sclerosis, lupus, chronic fatigue syndrome, attention deficit disorder, and muscular dystrophy, had been deliberately hidden from the public by the Food and Drug Administration, the Federal Trade Commission, and the major food and drug companies.

In one widely quoted example, he asserted that the University of Calgary had developed a "natural" diabetes treatment, then quashed its data, fearing reprisals from the pharmaceutical industry. (A spokesman for the school told ABC News that "there have been no human studies conducted at the University of Calgary in the past 20 years on herbal remedies for diabetes." The university later sent Trudeau a "cease and desist" letter, ordering him to stop using its name.)

Rose Shapiro cited Natural Cures as a prime example in her book, Suckers: How Alternative Medicine Makes Fools of Us All.

Natural Cures sold briskly due to an aggressive infomercial promotion. Quackwatch and other internet watchdog sites cautioned that the infomercial itself was "misleading". In a 2005 public warning from the New York State Consumer Protection Board, CPB Chairman Teresa A. Santiago cautioned that Natural Cures contained no actual cures, only "speculation". Cures were promised, but only by subscribing to Trudeau's newsletter or website at $71.40 per year or $499 for a "lifetime membership". The paid sites contained only additional, similarly unsubstantiated speculation, according to the CPB.

The Chicago Tribune also noted that a purported back-cover endorsement by former FDA commissioner Herbert Ley—who died three years before the book was written—was actually an excerpt from a 35-year-old New York Times interview.

=== More Natural Cures Revealed ===
Following Natural Cures "They" Don't Want You to Know About, Trudeau released a second medical guide two years later. His second book, More Natural Cures Revealed: Previously Censored Brand Name Products That Cure Disease, was self-published as well.

The book is a similar publication to his first, where he purports to explain why drug and food companies hide the truth about how their products can cause disease. In More Natural Cures Revealed, Trudeau writes that workers at the FDA and FTC want to censor him and, figuratively, burn his books. Though the book received negative comments from some reviewers, it received average ratings on both Amazon and GoodReads.com.

=== The Weight Loss Cure "They" Don't Want You to Know About ===
In April 2007, Trudeau released The Weight Loss Cure "They" Don't Want You to Know About. The book describes a weight loss plan originally proposed by British endocrinologist ATW Simeons in the 1950s involving injections of human chorionic gonadotropin (hCG). The diet was criticized in 1962 by the Journal of the American Medical Association as hazardous to human health and a waste of money.

In 1976, the FTC ordered clinics and promoters of the Simeons Diet and hCG to inform prospective patients that there had been no "substantial evidence" to conclude hCG offered any benefit above that achieved on a restricted calorie diet. Clinical research trials published by the Journal of the American Medical Association and the American Journal of Clinical Nutrition have shown that hCG is ineffective as a weight-loss aid, citing "no statistically significant difference in the means of the two groups" and that hCG "does not appear to enhance the effectiveness of a rigidly imposed regimen for weight reduction."

The FTC filed a contempt-of-court action against Trudeau alleging that the alleged misrepresentations in the book violate a 2004 consent order.

=== Debt Cures "They" Don't Want You to Know About ===
Debt Cures was published in 2007 and has been marketed on television. Chuck Jaffee, a columnist at CBS MarketWatch, stated: "Truth be told, most of the information (in the book) is readily available in personal finance columns you can find online or in books that are readily available in your local library." Trudeau says that if readers disagree with items on their credit reports, they can dispute them as identity theft; this was the "magic cure" of the book's title.

=== Your Wish Is Your Command ===
Published in 2009, the product says it gives tools on how to use the Law of Attraction to manifest readers' desires. The packaging also says it contains key links to using the Law of Attraction that are missing in other publications. Among the claims made in the related infomercial is Trudeau's assertion to have virtually flunked out of high school. He also says he was "taken in" by a mysterious group called "The Brotherhood" that taught him the secrets that he is now widely announcing in his book. There is also an invitation to join the "Global Information Network," an "exclusive group of highly influential, affluent, and freedom-orientated [sic] people" (see below). The network operated out of the Caribbean island Nevis and employed the Law of Attraction as its principal wealth generator, a concept generally regarded by much of the scientific community as placebo or pseudoscience.

== Media interviews ==
Trudeau has been interviewed by CNN's Paula Zahn, Matt Lauer of NBC's Today Show, and Harry Smith of CBS's The Early Show. Trudeau was also the subject of investigative reports done by Inside Edition, ABC's 20/20 and Dateline NBC. The 20/20 segment highlighted a Nightline interview with Jake Tapper in which Trudeau misrepresented the money he was forced to pay to the government, the charges filed against him and the reason the government did not follow through with charges, and claiming ignorance when the claims made in his book were called false by Tapper.

== Infomercials ==
At one time, Trudeau was a prolific producer of infomercials. He consented to an FTC ban applying to everything except publications that the FTC concluded would infringe upon his First Amendment rights. All of his subsequent infomercials advertised his books, Natural Cures "They" Don't Want You To Know About and The Weight Loss Cure. Notable co-hosts included Leigh Valentine (former wife of televangelist Robert Tilton) and the late Tammy Faye Messner (the former Tammy Faye Bakker).

In 2010, he directed the infomercial/film Investigating Free Money, that featured Misha Dibono and Tyrone Evans Clark, which aired on Fox through the platform U.S. Farm Report.

=== Pharmaceutical companies ===
Trudeau offers a conspiracy theory, saying that the drug industry and the FDA work with each other to effectively deceive the public by banning all-natural cures in order to protect the profits of the drug industry. Trudeau says that FDA commissioners who leave the FDA to work for large drug companies are paid millions of dollars. In any other industry, according to Trudeau, this would be called "bribery," a "conflict of interest" or "payoffs." Trudeau also says in his infomercials that the food industry includes chemicals (such as MSG and aspartame) to get people "addicted to food" and to "make people obese."

=== References to scientific studies ===
One of the major complaints about Trudeau's infomercials is that he makes only vague references to scientific studies, making them impossible to cross-check for accuracy. The same criticism exists for the anecdotal evidence that he presents in the infomercials. He does not identify people who he claims have been cured by his methods. For example, he tells a story in an infomercial about "a friend from England" who came to his house and complained of heartburn. He also references a study done on the antidepressant qualities of St. John's Wort compared to two prescription medications. These studies, the infomercials suggest, are identified in the book being advertised for sale, but none of his books provide any such substantiation. In an interview, he explained that he cannot reveal his source material because of "FTC suppression"; but readers can join his web site, where, for $9.99 a month or $499 for a lifetime, they can gain access to the special members-only section from which they can e-mail him for the information.

=== Newspaper articles ===
A pair of 2005 Associated Press articles by Candice Choi on the infomercials elaborated on the success and problems of the programs.

Choi says that by repeatedly mentioning government sanctions against him, Trudeau "anticipated any backlash with his cuckoo conspiracy theory" and can partially deflect any criticism of him or his infomercials. Trudeau's use of the word "cure" is an issue for regulators. Also, bookstores are polled on their decisions to sell or not sell a successful and controversial self-published book.

== Additional marketing ventures ==
=== Audio tapes: "Mega Memory" ===
Trudeau says he adapted techniques used to improve the memory of the blind and the mentally challenged to create Mega Memory and Advanced Mega Memory audio tapes. His promotion of memory-enhancing products was ended by the intervention of the Federal Trade Commission which alleged that the claims made by Trudeau were false and programs involved would not enable users to achieve a "photographic memory," as the advertising claimed.

Trudeau used research that Dr. Michael Van Masters conducted with the State School for the Blind in Muskogee, Oklahoma, in 1975 as the basis of the Mega Memory products. Trudeau was selling automobiles at Neponset Lincoln Mercury in the Dorchester neighborhood of Boston in 1982 when he first met Van Masters. Shortly after meeting Van Masters, he joined the latter's business in Chicago.

=== Howard Berg's Mega Speed Reading System ===
In the mid-1990s Trudeau teamed up with Howard Berg to promote his speed reading program and they appeared together in informercials. The FTC found that Berg's claims were "false" and "deceptive". Berg was ordered to cease all claims, keep a record of any future claims and to inform the FTC of any new business ventures.

=== Non-surgical facelift ===
In addition to Natural Cures, Trudeau also hosted an infomercial that features the "Perfect Lift" non-surgical facelift. In the United Kingdom, this infomercial was found to violate the ITC advertising rules.

In 2008, Trudeau began airing another infomercial, for a product called Firmalift, with Leigh Valentine.

=== Collaboration with Donald Barrett and ITV Direct ===
On September 11, 2006, Donald Barrett and ITV Direct, a direct marketing company based in Beverly, Massachusetts, announced that they would work with Trudeau to market both of his Natural Cures books. Trudeau also worked with ITV to create ITV Ventures, a new MLM group based out of ITV's home office. As of December 2006, ITV Direct has pulled all information concerning both this relationship and Trudeau's books from its corporate website; however, the infomercials continued to run for several years thereafter.

== International Pool Tour ==
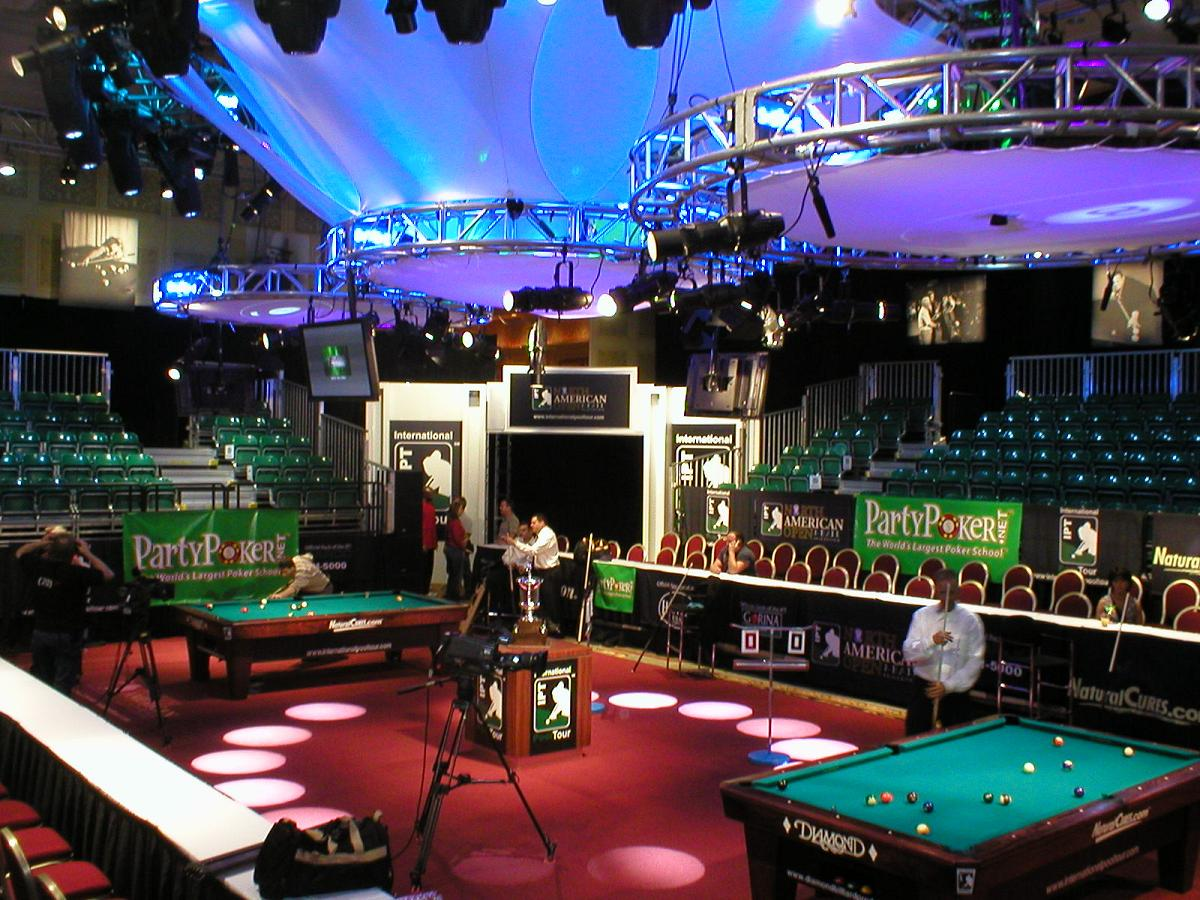
IPT Starship Stage for TV rounds and finals at North American Championship held in Las Vegas, Nevada, July 2006

In 2005, Trudeau founded the International Pool Tour (IPT). His goal was to transform billiards into a "major league" sport with aggressive promotion and the largest purses ever offered. The initial three events in 2005 and early 2006 were successful, but at the fourth, the IPT World Open tournament in Reno, Nevada, promoters announced that they did not have sufficient funds on hand to cover the purse. Winners were assured that they would receive their prizes in small installments, but most were never paid. The Reno fiasco marked the demise not only of IPT but of professional pool competitions as a whole. As one commentator put it, "The pool hustler wasn't murdered by any single suspect, but the last man holding the knife was Kevin Trudeau."

== Legal proceedings ==
In connection with his promotional activities he has had a felony conviction and has been an unsuccessful defendant in several US Federal Trade Commission lawsuits. Trudeau has been charged several times by agencies of the United States government for making claims without evidence. In these cases, Trudeau signed a consent decree in which he did not plead guilty but did agree to stop making the claims and to pay a fine. Trudeau subsequently began to sell books, which are protected by the First Amendment.

Trudeau was convicted of fraud and larceny in the early 1990s. The FTC has sued him repeatedly and keeps an extensive record of its conflicts with him. A court order currently restricts his ability to promote and sell any product or service; however, he is permitted to promote books and other publications due to free-speech protection under the First Amendment as long as they are not used to promote or sell products or services and do not contain misrepresentations. On November 19, 2007, a court found Trudeau in contempt of that court order for making deceptive claims about his book The Weight Loss Cure "They" Don't Want You to Know About. In August 2008, he was fined more than $5 million and banned from infomercials for three years for continuing to make fraudulent claims pertaining to the book. The amount of the monetary damages was later increased to $37 million.

=== 1990–1991: Larceny and credit card fraud ===
In 1990, Trudeau posed as a doctor in order to deposit $80,000 in false checks, and in 1991, he pleaded guilty to larceny. That same year, Trudeau faced federal charges of credit card fraud after he stole the names and Social Security numbers of eleven customers of a mega memory product and charged $122,735.68 on their credit cards. He spent two years in federal prison because of this conviction. Later, in an interview, he explained his crimes as:

... youthful indiscretions and not as bad as they sound, and besides, both were partly the fault of other people, and besides, he has changed. The larceny he explains as a series of math errors compounded by the "mistake" of a bank official. As for why the bank thought he was a doctor, that was just a simple misunderstanding, because he jokingly referred to himself as a "doctor in memory". He still can't quite believe he was prosecuted for the larceny charges. "Give me a break," he says.

=== 1996: SEC and various states ===
Trudeau began working for Nutrition For Life, a multi-level marketing program, in the mid-1990s. In 1996, his recruitment practices were cited by the states of Illinois and Michigan, as well as the U.S. Securities and Exchange Commission. Illinois sued Trudeau and Jules Leib, his partner, accusing them of operating an illegal pyramid scheme. They settled with Illinois and seven other states for $185,000 after agreeing to change their tactics. Michigan forbade him from operating in the state. A class action lawsuit was filed by stockholders of Nutrition for Life for violations of Texas law, including misrepresenting and/or omitting material information about Nutrition for Life International, Inc.'s business. In August 1997, the company paid $2 million in cash to common stockholders and holders of warrants during the class period to settle the case. The company also paid the plaintiffs' attorney fees of $600,000.

=== 1998: FTC fine ===
In 1998, Trudeau was fined $500,000, the funds to be used for consumer redress by the FTC, relating to six infomercials he had produced and in which the FTC determined he had made false or misleading claims. These infomercials included "Hair Farming," "Mega Memory System," "Addiction Breaking System," "Action Reading," "Eden's Secret," and "Mega Reading." The products included a "hair farming system" that was supposed to "finally end baldness in the human race," and "a breakthrough that in 60 seconds can eliminate" addictions, discovered when a certain "Dr. Callahan" was "studying quantum physics."

=== 2004: FTC contempt of court and injunction ===
In June 2003, the FTC filed a complaint in the U.S. District Court for the Northern District of Illinois against Trudeau and some of his companies (Shop America (USA), LLC; Shop America Marketing Group, LLC; and Trustar Global Media, Limited), alleging that disease-related claims for Coral Calcium Supreme were false and unsubstantiated. In July 2003, Trudeau entered into a stipulated preliminary injunction that prohibited him from continuing to make the challenged claims for Coral Calcium Supreme and Biotape.

In the summer of 2004, the court found Trudeau in contempt of court for violating the preliminary injunction, because he had sent out a direct mail piece and produced an infomercial making prohibited claims. The court ordered Trudeau to cease all marketing for coral calcium products.

In September 2004, Trudeau agreed to pay $2 million ($500,000 in cash plus transfer of residential property located in Ojai, California, and a luxury vehicle) to settle charges that he falsely claimed that a coral calcium product can cure cancer and other serious diseases and that a purported analgesic called Biotape can permanently cure or relieve severe pain. He also agreed to a lifetime ban on promoting products using infomercials, but excluded restrictions to promote his books via infomercials. Trudeau was the only person ever banned by the FTC from selling a product via television. Lydia Parnes, speaking for the FTC's Bureau of Consumer Protection stated: "This ban is meant to shut down an infomercial empire that has misled American consumers for years." Trudeau claimed the government was trying to discredit his book because he was "exposing them."

=== 2005: Trudeau v. FTC ===
On February 28, 2005, Trudeau filed a complaint against the FTC in the U.S. District Court for the District of Columbia seeking declaratory and injunctive relief. Trudeau also filed a motion for preliminary injunction, which the court denied.

The complaint charged that the FTC had retaliated against him for his criticism of the agency by issuing a press release that falsely characterized and intentionally and deliberately misrepresented the 2004 Final Order. That conduct, Trudeau asserted, exceeded the FTC's authority under 15 U.S.C. § 46(f) and violated the First Amendment. The FTC responded with a motion to dismiss the complaint for lack of subject-matter jurisdiction under Federal Rule of Civil Procedure 12(b)(1), and for failure to state a claim for which relief can be granted under Rule 12(b)(6).

The district court granted the FTC's motion to dismiss. First, the court concluded that it lacked subject-matter jurisdiction because the press release was not "a 'final agency action'" under "section 704 of the [Administrative Procedure Act]", 5 U.S.C. § 704. Second, the court held, "in the alternative, that Trudeau's claims failed to state a viable cause of action as a matter of law."

Trudeau later filed an appeal which was unsuccessful in reversing the court's ruling.

=== 2005: Trudeau v. New York Consumer Protection Board ===
Trudeau filed a lawsuit on August 11, 2005, accusing the New York State Consumer Protection Board of violating his First Amendment rights by contacting television stations in New York state and urging them to pull Trudeau's infomercials promoting his book Natural Cures "They" Don't Want You to Know About. Trudeau won a temporary restraining order on September 6, 2005, prohibiting the Board from sending letters to the television stations. The temporary restraining order was replaced by a preliminary injunction. However, Trudeau lost a motion to have the Board send a "corrective letter" to the television stations and subsequently dropped all claims for monetary damages. The U.S. Court of Appeals for the Second Circuit ruled in favor of Kevin Trudeau, reversing the lower court's decision. The appellate court held that the Consumer Protection Board's actions, which included sending letters to media outlets urging them not to run Trudeau's infomercials, constituted a violation of his First Amendment rights. The decision was issued in 2005.

=== 2007: FTC contempt of court action ===
The FTC filed a contempt of court action against Trudeau and the companies that market The Weight Loss Cure 'They' Don't Want You to Know About, alleging that Trudeau was in contempt of a 2004 court order by "deceptively claiming in his infomercials that the book being advertised establishes a weight-loss protocol that is 'easy' to follow." The action was filed in the U.S. District Court for the Northern District of Illinois on September 17, 2007. According to an FTC press release, Trudeau has claimed that the weight loss plan outlined in the book is easy, can be done at home, and readers can eat anything they want. When consumers buy the book, they find it describes a complex plan that requires intense dieting, daily injections of a prescribed drug that is not easily obtainable, and lifelong dietary restrictions.

On November 19, 2007, Trudeau was found in contempt of the 2004 court order for "patently false" claims in his weight loss book. US District Court Judge Robert W. Gettleman ruled that Trudeau "clearly misrepresents in his advertisements the difficulty of the diet described in his book, and by doing so, he has misled thousands of consumers." On August 7, 2008, Gettleman issued an order that Trudeau was not to appear in infomercials for any product in which he has any interest, for three years from the date of the order; and was to pay a penalty of $5,173,000, an estimate of the royalties received from the weight loss book. On November 4, 2008, Gettleman amended the judgment to $37,616,161, the amount consumers paid in response to the deceptive infomercials. The court denied Trudeau's request to reconsider or stay this ruling on December 11 of the same year.

Trudeau appealed the ruling to the United States Court of Appeals for the Seventh Circuit which upheld the contempt finding, but sent the case back to the lower court to explain the basis of the $37,616,161 damage finding and the three-year infomercial ban. After the lower court justified the basis for the damage finding, and set a $2 million performance bond for future infomercial advertising, Trudeau again appealed to the Seventh Circuit, which affirmed the damage award on November 29, 2011.

=== 2010: Arrest on criminal contempt of court charge ===
On February 11, 2010, Trudeau was arrested and appeared in U.S. District Court before Gettleman for criminal contempt of court after he "asked his supporters to email the federal judge overseeing a pending civil case brought against him by the Federal Trade Commission." He was forced to turn over his passport, pay a $50,000 bond and was warned he could face future prison time for interfering with the direct process of the court. On February 17, Gettleman sentenced Trudeau to 30 days in jail and forfeiture of the $50,000 bond. Psychiatrist Stephen Barrett, the creator of Quackwatch.org, "has for years labeled Trudeau a fraud" and was quoted: "He struck me as somebody who (believes he) is omnipotent. That is, no one can touch him," Barrett said. "That's almost been the case." Trudeau appealed the ruling and on May 20 the Seventh Circuit Court of Appeals granted his motion, dismissing the contempt citation.

=== 2011: Loss of appeal against $37.6 million fine ===
On November 28, 2011, the U.S. Food and Drug Administration and the Federal Trade Commission issued warnings to companies selling human chorionic gonadotropin (HCG) as weight loss products as the claims are unsupported. The HCG diet was popularized by Trudeau's The Weight-Loss Cure "They" Don't Want You to Know About book in 2007.

On November 29, 2011, Trudeau lost his 2010 appeal in the Seventh Circuit Court of Appeals. The court found that the $37.6 million fine for violating his 2004 settlement with the Federal Trade Commission was appropriate as Trudeau had aired 32,000 infomercials and described the figure as "conservative." The court considered sales only from the 800 number used to place orders and excluded internet and store sales. Additionally, the court found that requiring Trudeau to make a $2 million performance bond prior to participating in an infomercial was constitutional.

=== 2013–2015: Additional contempt citations, asset concealment, imprisonment ===
In September 2013, Judge Gettleman held Trudeau in civil contempt for violation of multiple court orders and failure to pay the $37 million fine assessed in 2010. Noting that he continued to maintain a lavish lifestyle, despite insisting that he had been "completely wiped out" financially, Gettleman appointed a receiver to identify and catalog Trudeau's assets and holdings. A month later Trudeau was arrested after refusing to cooperate with the receiver's investigation. In November a jury found him in criminal contempt for repeated violations of his 2004 agreement as well as subsequent orders and plea deals. Pending sentencing he was held without bail as a flight risk, and for continued failure to disclose hidden assets.

In February 2014, the court-appointed receiver announced that a number of Trudeau's known assets, including a home in Ojai, California, would be auctioned, with proceeds to be applied toward unpaid fines and restitution. The receiver also assumed control of Trudeau's Global Information Network (GIN), the Nevis-based "secret club" that had promised extraordinary "secrets to success". Court officials informed GIN members that the club's business model "likely amounted to an illegal pyramid scheme", and that its relentlessly publicized group of 30 billionaire financial advisors known as the "GIN Council" did not exist. GIN's remaining assets were later auctioned as well.

In March 2014, Trudeau was sentenced to 10 years in prison, an "unusually lengthy" term for a contempt conviction. Judge Ronald Guzman, "visibly irritated" by Trudeau's plea for leniency, described him as "deceitful to the core". "[Trudeau] has treated federal court orders as if they were mere suggestions ... or at most, impediments to be sidestepped, outmaneuvered or just ignored," Guzman said. "That type of conduct simply cannot stand." Trudeau filed an appeal, contending that (a) Gettleman erred in ruling that Trudeau's misrepresentations of the content of Free Money "They" Don't Want You to Know About was in contempt of the court's 2004 Order; (b) that the district court abused its discretion when it ordered him to pay compensatory damages of $37.6 million; and (c) further abused its discretion when it amended its 2004 Order to prohibit him from participating in infomercials promoting his books. In February 2016, a federal appeals court found no basis to accept Trudeau's claims, and ruled that the 10-year sentence was reasonable, given "the size of Trudeau's fraud and the flagrant and repetitive nature of his contumacious conduct."

Trudeau served most of his sentence at the Federal Prison Camp Montgomery in Alabama. Later, he was transferred to a Chicago area "halfway house" program. He is still involved in publicity for his Global Information Network, which by one account is using some of the language of Scientology to attract members. A group of his fans and followers maintain an active Facebook fan page for him, posting motivational words by or about him, soliciting donations for his "defense fund" and for his support once he is released from prison, and comparing his imprisonment to that of heroes and martyrs such as Nelson Mandela.

In April 2014, Guzman ordered that royalties payable to Trudeau from continuing sales of his books—now owned by a California company called Free is My Favorite LLC, which purchased the rights from Trudeau—be forwarded to a government-controlled trust and used for fine and restitution payments. Infomercials for Free Money "They" Don't Want You to Know About, produced and marketed by Free is My Favorite LLC, continue to run on television stations throughout the United States. In October 2015, Gettleman approved a partial refund of about $8 million to more than 820,000 people who bought The Weight Loss Cure "They" Don't Want You to Know About.

=== 2022–present: Release and continued government proceedings ===
Trudeau left federal custody in 2022 after eight years, but the $37.6 million fine remained unpaid. The US government quickly moved to seize cash and other valuables that Trudeau may have hidden, including gold bars. After failing to appear at a hearing, Trudeau was held in contempt of court.

== Other criticisms ==
=== Medical experience ===
One common criticism by consumer groups is that Trudeau has had no medical training. Trudeau responds that by not having such training, he is not biased toward pharmaceutical companies and the FDA, and that medical doctors "are taught only how to write out prescriptions" for "poisons" and "cut out pieces of a person's anatomy."

=== Unsubstantiated claims ===
Trudeau has been criticized for his inability to provide evidence to back up his claims. Although he recites anecdotes, he has never provided evidence evaluated by licensed medical practitioners. In instances where Trudeau has been asked to provide proof, he has misinterpreted medical studies or cited dubious or fictitious studies. For example, Trudeau cited a nonexistent 25-year research study involving a natural cure for diabetes at the University of Calgary. When ABC News correspondent Jake Tapper confronted him on Nightline, Trudeau insisted that he had a copy of the study and would provide it; he never did. He later claimed in his infomercials that the university destroyed its findings to prevent reprisals from the pharmaceutical industry. In 2006 University of Calgary officials announced in a public statement that none of Trudeau's claims about the university's research were true, and that its attorneys had sent Trudeau a "cease and desist" letter, demanding that he stop associating himself with the school.

=== False endorsements ===
In August 2005, the New York Consumer Protection Board warned consumers that Trudeau has used false claims of endorsements to promote his products, noting that the back cover of Natural Cures includes false endorsements. Further, the NYCPB states that Trudeau's television advertisements "give the false impression that Tammy Faye Messner opposes chemotherapy in favor of the 'natural cures' in Trudeau's book." A representative for Messner before her death from cancer said that was not true and that she was starting chemotherapy again.

The back cover includes the following quotation from Dr. Herbert Ley, a former commissioner of the U.S. Food and Drug Administration who died three years before the book was written: "The thing that bugs me is that people think the FDA is protecting them. It isn't. What the FDA is doing and what people think it's doing are as different as night and day." The statement, extracted from a 1969 interview in The New York Times, was made in the context of Ley's resignation from his post as a result of numerous policy disputes. Trudeau's lawyer, David J. Bradford, says that this quotation does not constitute a false endorsement of the book by Ley, but rather is merely a statement that is in line with the purpose of the book.
