= Graeme Catto =

Scottish doctor (born 1945)

Sir Graeme Robertson Dawson Catto FRSE, Hon FRCSE, FRCP(Lon, Edin & Glasg), FRCGP, FFPM, FAoP, FMedSci FKC (born 24 April 1945) is a Scottish doctor who was president, later chair, of the General Medical Council until April 2009. He is also currently emeritus professor of medicine at the Universities of London and Aberdeen and was an honorary consultant nephrologist at Guy's and St Thomas' NHS Foundation Trust and Aberdeen Royal Infirmary.

== Early life ==
Graeme Catto was born in Aberdeen, the son of a local general practitioner. He attended Robert Gordon's College (Aberdeen; 1950–63), becoming school captain and gaining the Otaki Shield for the pupil outstanding in character, leadership and athletics. The linked trip to New Zealand where he was an official visitor was made by ship through the Panama Canal. Returning to the UK, he obtained the first medical bursary to study medicine at the University of Aberdeen, winning a Carnegie scholarship to Northwestern University (Chicago) in 1968, and graduating MB ChB with honours in 1969 as the most distinguished graduate of the year.

== Career in medicine ==
Two years later he obtained the Membership of the Royal Colleges of Physicians (MRCP UK) and developed an interest in both general and renal medicine. Research into the bone disease associated with renal failure led to an MD (Hons) in 1975 and a Harkness Fellowship of the Commonwealth Fund of New York to study medicine at Harvard Medical School and the Peter Bent Brigham Hospital, Boston. While in the US, he became interested in kidney transplant immunology and continued to publish original articles in medical journals. As part of the Fellowship commitment to "experience the American way of life" he, together with his wife and young children, travelled all round the US in 1976.

Back in Aberdeen as a senior lecturer in medicine and honorary consultant physician and nephrologist, Graeme Catto created an active renal research group studying transplant immunology, renal bone disease and the facilities required for patients with kidney disease. He graduated with a DSc in 1988. Over time, he became medical director of Aberdeen Royal Infirmary, professor then dean and vice-principal of Aberdeen University. In 1993 he was elected a member of the Harveian Society of Edinburgh and in 2003 served as president of the society.

In 1996, he became chief scientist for the NHS in Scotland, a member of the Scottish Higher Education Funding Council and then chairman of the General Medical Council's education committee. A fellow of all three medical royal colleges of physicians, he became a Fellow of the Royal Society of Edinburgh and both a founder fellow of the Academy of Medical Sciences and its first treasurer. For a decade from 1995 he was chairman of the board of governors of Robert Gordon's College, Aberdeen.

In 2000, he became vice-principal at King's College London and Dean of Guy's, King's College and St Thomas' Hospitals' Medical & Dental School. Knighted in 2002 for services to medicine and medical education, he became president of the General Medical Council, where he had to deal with the consequences of the Dr Harold Shipman inquiry, and pro vice-chancellor at the University of London at a time of major change. He was a member of the South East London Strategic Health Authority and sought to promote interprofessional education in healthcare. For four years from 2004 he was appointed a founder member of the Caribbean Accreditation Authority for Education in Medicine and other Health Professions (CAAM-HP).

In 2005 he returned to the University of Aberdeen to spearhead the successful fundraising for the Matthew Hay Centre. At this time he was also a governor of the Qatar Science & Technology Park. His work has been recognised by a fellowship from King's College London (2005), honorary fellowships from the Royal College of General Practitioners (2000), Royal College of Surgeons of Edinburgh (2002), Faculty of Pharmaceutical Medicine (2008) and Academy of Medical Educators (2012) and honorary degrees from the universities of Aberdeen (LLD 2002), St Andrews (DSc 2003), Southampton (MD 2004), Robert Gordon (DSc 2004), Kent (DSc 2007), South Bank (DSc 2008), London (DSc 2009), Brighton (DSc 2010), Buckingham (MD 2015).

He chaired the Scottish Stem Cell Network from 2007 to 2011, the Higher Education Better Regulation Group from 2010 to 2012, was president of the Association for the Study of Medical Education (ASME) from 2009 to 2013, and was president of The College of Medicine, an organisation that aims to "ensure that the patient is at the centre of medicine and of all healthcare policies and systems". from 2010 to 2015. The establishment of the organization was controversial, having been criticized in the Guardian and the British Medical Journal over links to the Prince's Foundation for Integrated Health and its promotion of complementary medicine. The college responded to its critics with an open letter in the British Medical Journal.

Graeme Catto is a founder member of the board of the Qatar Council for Healthcare Practitioners, vice-president of the Academy of Experts and Patron of the Medical Council on Alcohol. He was a member of the Commission on Assisted Dying. and co-chaired a working party on medical and dental student numbers from 2010 to 2012. At the beginning of 2012 for five years he became chairman of both Lathallan School and Dignity in Dying , an organisation seeking to legalise assisted suicide for terminally ill adults.
