= George Lewith =

British researcher and practitioner of complementary medicine (1950–2017)

- Born: 12 January 1950
- Died: 17 March 2017 (aged 67)
- Education: University of Cambridge, Westminster Medical School
- Known for: CAM research and advocacy
- Scientific career
- Fields: Complementary medicine
- Workplaces: University of Southampton, University of Westminster

George Lewith (12 January 1950 – 17 March 2017) was a professor at the University of Southampton researching alternative medicine and a practitioner of complementary medicine. He was a prominent and sometimes controversial advocate of complementary medicine in the UK.

== Education and career ==
Lewith graduated from Trinity College, Cambridge in medicine and biochemistry. He then went on to Westminster Medical School to complete his clinical studies and began working clinically in 1974. In 1977 Lewith became a member of the Royal College of Physicians. Then, in 1980, he became a member of the Royal College of General Practitioners and, later in 1999, was elected a fellow of the Royal College of Physicians.

At the time of his death, he was a Professor of Health Research in the Department of Primary Care at the University of Southampton and a director of the International Society for Complementary Medicine Research. Lewith obtained a significant number of institutional peer reviewed fellowships at doctoral and post-doctoral level and was principal investigator or collaborator in research grants totally over £5 million during the last decade.

Between 1980 and 2010, Lewith was a partner at the Centre for Complementary and Integrated Medicine, a private practice providing complementary treatments with clinics in London and Southampton.

== Research ==
Lewith's research has ranged across several areas of complementary medicine. This has involved examining how complementary techniques might be investigated and the development of new research methodology to evaluate complementary techniques, as well as the collection of primary research data concerning a variety of complementary techniques. His primary research has included examinations of the clinical effects of acupuncture and possible acupuncture mechanisms, the effects of distant and present healing, the clinical effects of homoeopathy, the effects and activity of herbal medicine, the clinical effects of the Alexander technique and the use and effectiveness of a variety of nutritional supplements and herbs. Lewith has also co-authored several studies indicating a lack of specific efficacy in some complementary therapies and techniques.

He has also investigated how and why people use complementary medicine and is currently involved in two major EU projects. One looking at the use, delivery and possible future research strategies of complementary medicine in Europe and another relating to the use and investigation of Chinese herbal medicines within a European context.

In his career, Lewith has published over 330 peer-reviewed publications, authored several books and contributed to several others.

== Broadcasting, advocacy and controversy ==
Lewith was a council member of the Foundation for Integrated Medicine and later a foundation fellow of the Prince of Wales' Foundation for Integrated Health, a controversial charity that promoted complementary medicine and has since closed. The Foundation for Integrated Medicine became the Prince of Wales' Foundation for Integrated Health in 2000. In an article, Lewith described his research unit at the University of Southampton as having played an important role in the development of the foundation, with especial regard to its research and development agenda.

In 1997, Lewith presented a documentary series examining complementary medicine for Channel 4 called Natural Born Healers. The series won a Royal Television Society award for its programme on herbalism. However, the series also drew criticism from Dr. Peter May and colleagues at the Grove Medical Practice in Southampton, who had cooperated with the programme, in a complaint to HealthWatch. A book of the same title as the documentary series and co-authored by Lewith accompanied the series.

In 2004 he participated in a radio series presented by Anna Ford about complementary medicine co-produced by BBC Radio 4 and the Open University, titled The Other Medicine.

A 2006 BBC documentary series, Alternative Medicine, was criticised by several people, including Lewith, in the Guardian over a controversial sequence in which acupuncture appeared to be used as a replacement for general anaesthesia during open heart surgery. Lewith had participated in the series as an advisor, but criticised the programme for inappropriate sensationalism and poor interpretation of science.

In criticisms published in the British Medical Journal, both Jane Cassidy and David Colquhoun criticise Lewith, claiming that he prescribes homoeopathy despite having written papers that conclude it doesn't work. Lewith has conducted research suggesting that the homeopathic remedy has no effect, and other research suggesting that, while the homeopathic medicine itself does not appear to have an effect, the homeopathic consultation has a clinically relevant non-specific effect.

== Selected bibliography ==
Selected papers

- (2006) "Developing a research strategy for acupuncture". Clinical Journal of Pain 22 (7): 632–638.
- (2004) Can a standardised acupuncture technique palliate disabling breathlessness: a single blind, placebo controlled, crossover study. Chest 125 (5): 1783–90.
- (2002) Do attitudes toward and beliefs about complementary medicine affect treatment outcomes?" American Journal of Public Health 92 (10): 1604–1606.
- (2002) "A double-blind, randomised, controlled clinical trial of ultramolecular potencies of house dust mite in asthmatic patients". British Medical Journal 324: 520–523.
- (2001) "Does electrodermal testing correlate with skin prick tests for allergies: a double-blind, randomised, controlled trial". British Medical Journal 322: 131–134.

Selected books

- The Acupuncture Treatment of Internal Disease: An Introduction to the Use of Traditional Chinese Acupuncture in the Treatment of Some Common Internal Diseases. Thorsons Publishers 1985. ISBN 978-0-7225-1103-9.
- Alternative Therapies: A Guide to Complementary Medicine for the Health Professional. Heinemann, 1985. ISBN 978-0-433-19270-1.
- Modern Chinese Acupuncture: A Review of Acupuncture Techniques as Practiced in China Today (with N. R. Lewith). Merlin Press, 1994. ISBN 978-1-85425-088-9.
- Acupuncture: Its Place in Western Medical Science. Merlin Press, 1998. ISBN 978-1-85425-091-9.
- Understanding Complementary Medicine. Family Doctor Publications, 2004. ISBN 978-1-903474-05-1.
