= Joan Higgins =

British academic, educator and public health service manager

Dame Joan Margaret Higgins, DBE FAcSS is a British academic, educator, and public health service manager.

== Career ==
Higgins graduated in social administration from the University of York in 1971 and has held academic posts at the University of Portsmouth, University of Southampton (where she was professor of social policy) and University of Manchester (where she was professor of health policy, from 1992, and director of the Manchester Centre for Healthcare Management 1998–2004). In 2002–03 she was president of the European Health Management Association. Her roles include:

- Chair of the NHS Litigation Authority, 2007–2013
- Member (since 2005) of the QC Appointments Panel
- Chair, Federal Working Group The Prince's Foundation for Integrated Health on complementary therapy
- Chair (since 2001), Patient Information Advisory Group (PIAG) in the Department of Health
- Chair, Ethics Advisory Group, NHS Care Record Development Board
- Chair, Christie NHS Trust, 2002–2007
- Chair, NHS regional office for the North West
- Chair, Manchester Health Authority

== Awards ==
- Honorary fellow of the Faculty of Public Health Medicine
- Honorary fellow of the Institute of Health Record Information and Management
- Emerita professor of health policy at the University of Manchester

== Damehood ==
In 2007, she was created a Dame Commander of the Order of the British Empire (DBE).
