= Focus on Alternative and Complementary Therapies =

- Discipline: Alternative medicine
- Language: English
- Edited by: Edzard Ernst

Publication details
- History: 1996-2016
- Publisher: Wiley-Blackwell on behalf of the Royal Pharmaceutical Society of Great Britain (United Kingdom)
- Frequency: Quarterly

Standard abbreviations
- ISO 4: Focus Altern. Complement. Ther.

Indexing
- ISSN: 1465-3753 (print); 2042-7166 (web)
- LCCN: 2011206010
- OCLC no.: 728924758

Links
- Journal homepage; Online access; Online archive

Focus on Alternative and Complementary Therapies was a peer-reviewed medical review journal covering complementary and alternative medicine. The journal's founder and editor-in-chief was Edzard Ernst (University of Exeter). Established in 1996, it was published by Wiley-Blackwell on behalf of the Royal Pharmaceutical Society of Great Britain. It was discontinued in 2016.

== Abstracting and indexing ==
The journal is abstracted and indexed in:

- Abstracts on Hygiene and Communicable Diseases
- Allied & Complementary Medicine Database
- CAB Abstracts
- CINAHL
- Embase
- EMCare
- Global Health
- Horticultural Science Abstracts
- Scopus
- Tropical Diseases Bulletin
