= A Scientist in Wonderland =

2015 autobiography by Edzard Ernst

- First edition
- Author: Edzard Ernst
- Language: English
- Subject: Autobiography
- Publisher: Imprint Academic
- Publication date: 12 January 2015
- Media type: Print; digital
- ISBN: 978-1845407773

A Scientist in Wonderland: A Memoir of Searching for Truth and Finding Trouble is an autobiography by Edzard Ernst. Ernst writes about being a homeopathic patient in childhood and, later, a homeopathic practitioner. His doubts about the practice eventually lead him to reject it, and he becomes an outspoken critic of the alternative modality.
