= Richard Bayliss =

English physician (1917–2006)

Richard Ian Samuel Bayliss
- Born: 2 January 1917
- Died: 21 April 2006 (aged 89)
- Education: St Thomas' Hospital Medical School
- Awards: KCVO, MD, FRCP
- Scientific career
- Fields: Medicine
- Workplaces: St Thomas' Hospital, Hammersmith Hospital, Columbia University, Westminster Hospital

Sir Richard Ian Samuel Bayliss KCVO FRCP (2 January 1917 – 21 April 2006) was an English physician specialising in endocrinology. He became Physician to the Queen and head of the Medical Household.

== Early life and training ==
Richard Bayliss was born in Tettenhall, then in Staffordshire, and was the son of an ironmaster. His early education was at Rugby School, and he then undertook pre-clinical studies in medicine at Clare College, Cambridge. His clinical training was at St Thomas' Hospital Medical School, London, where he qualified in medicine in 1941.

== Career ==
Following qualification, during the bombing of London in World War II, Bayliss undertook a number of jobs at St Thomas' Hospital, rising to the position of resident assistant physician. In 1945 he joined the Royal Army Medical Corps and for three years was head of medical services in India. Bayliss was awarded his MD in 1946, his thesis being on the subject of cardiac metastases from bronchogenic carcinoma. He returned to England in 1948 and in 1950 was appointed lecturer in medicine and consultant physician at Hammersmith Hospital. In 1950–51 he was also visiting Rockefeller fellow at Columbia University, New York. Bayliss moved to Westminster Hospital in 1954, becoming consultant physician specialising in endocrinology, and was dean of Westminster Hospital Medical School from 1960 to 1965. He retired from Westminster Hospital in 1981 but continued to see patients privately, and also undertook advisory, consultant and directing roles for a number of institutions, including the Royal Navy, the British Heart Foundation, and the British Thyroid Foundation.

== Royal Household ==
Bayliss joined the Medical Household as physician to the Royal Household in 1964. He was Physician to the Queen from 1970 to 1983, head of the Medical Household from 1973 to 1982, and was created KCVO in 1978. Amongst his other royal duties, Bayliss attended Princess Anne in 1976 when she fell from a horse, and he was present at the birth of Zara Phillips in 1981. He also attended the Duchess of Kent in 1977 after the loss of her baby, and again in 1979.

== Personal life ==
Bayliss was an accomplished pianist, and helped to organise the Christmas shows while a student at St Thomas'. He was proficient at jazz, and spent three months as a professional musician in Munich. Bayliss was also a keen skier and had been skiing shortly before his death at the age of 89. He was a lifelong smoker, and suffered from a variety of diseases. In 1964, at the age of 48, he suffered a myocardial infarction (heart attack) and, against medical advice, he was skiing within three weeks. He underwent coronary artery bypass surgery, and also suffered from a leaking aortic aneurysm, and a perforated Meckel's diverticulum. In addition he suffered from histoplasmosis, a fungal infection that he probably contracted while he was in the US. His death was due to cancer.

Bayliss was married three times. From his first marriage with Margaret-Joan Hardman, he had a son, who became a consultant radiologist, and a daughter. He had two daughters from his second marriage with Constance-Ellen Frey. Both these marriages were dissolved, and when he died, his third marriage with countess Marina de Borchgrave d'Altena had lasted 27 years.

== Lectures and publications ==
=== Lectures ===
Both to the Royal College of Physicians:

- 1974 Croonian Lecture on Idiopathic oedema in women.
- 1983 Harveian Oration on Thyroid disease as the expression of autoimmune disorder.

=== Publications ===
Bayliss published 100 papers, and wrote 33 chapters in books. He was also the author of:

- Practical Procedures in Clinical Medicine (1950) (London, J & A Churchill), which ran to three editions
- Thyroid Disease: the Facts (Oxford, (1982) Oxford University Press), a book for patients, which also went to three editions.
- In Sickness and in Health: a Physician Remembers (2007) (Lewes, Book Guild), personal memoirs.

== Interviews ==
Bayliss, Richard; Walton, John (1992). "Sir Richard Bayliss KCVO in interview with Lord Walton of Detchant" (Interview). Oxford Brookes University. doi:10.24384/000146.
