= NHS Resolution =

Agency overview
- Formed: October 1995
- Type: Special Health Authority
- Jurisdiction: England
- Status: Active
- Headquarters: London
- Employees: 578 (in 2023, full time equivalent)
- Annual budget: £52m (operating expenditure) (2022/23)
- Agency executives: Sally Cheshire, Chair; Helen Vernon, Chief Executive
- Parent department: Department of Health and Social Care
- Website: resolution.nhs.uk

NHS Resolution, the operating name of NHS Litigation Authority, is an arm's length body of the Department of Health and Social Care. It changed its name in April 2017.

The organisation's purpose is to provide expertise to the NHS on resolving concerns fairly, share learning for improvement and preserve resources for patient care.

== History ==
The NHS Litigation Authority was established in 1995 as a special health authority. Its current duties are established under the National Health Service Act 2006. It began using the name NHS Resolution in April 2017, reflecting a change of role to "the early settlement of cases, learning from what goes wrong and the prevention of errors" according to Jeremy Hunt, Secretary of State for Health.

== Services ==
NHS Resolution's strategic plan Delivering fair resolution and learning from harm, published in 2017 and updated in 2019, outlined a shift in emphasis away from predominantly claim management to proactive, earlier interventions to support families and staff.

The services provided include:

- Claims management, for clinical and non-clinical claims
- A tribunal service for primary care contracting disputes
- Advice and support regarding concerns about the individual performance of doctors, dentists and pharmacists
- Support to the NHS to aid understanding of claims risk, to assist patient safety activity.

== Claims management ==
In September 2023, NHS Resolution's annual report for 2022/23 stated that payments for clinical negligence in the NHS were £2.7bn of which 64% by value related to obstetric claims. This increased to £2.8bn in 2023/24. During 2023/24, NHS Resolution received 13,833 new clinical negligence claims, representing a 4% decrease from the previous year.

== List of chairs ==
- Ronald Bradshaw (1995–2007)
- Joan Higgins (2007–2013)
- Ian Dilks (2014–2020)
- Martin Thomas (2021–2022)
- Mike Pinkerton (2022) interim
- Sally Cheshire (2022–)

Helen Vernon has been chief executive since 2014.
