= Huw Thomas (physician) =

British physician and academic (born 1958)

Sir Huw Thomas KCVO FRCP
- Born: Huw Jeremy Wyndham Thomas; February 25, 1958 (age 68); London, England
- Education: Harrow School; Trinity College, Cambridge (BA); London Hospital Medical College (MBBS); University College London (PhD)
- Known for: Head of the Medical Household, Physician to the Queen
- Medical career
- Profession: Physician
- Institutions: St Mary's Hospital; Imperial College London; St Mark's Hospital; King Edward VII's Hospital
- Sub-specialties: Gastroenterology
- Research: Molecular genetics of colorectal cancer

Sir Huw Jeremy Wyndham Thomas KCVO FRCP (born 25 February 1958) is a British gastroenterologist at St Mary's Hospital, London, and professor of Gastrointestinal Genetics at Imperial College London and St Mark's Hospital.

In 2005 he was appointed physician to the Royal Household and in July 2014, head of the Medical Household, the medical section of the Royal Household of the British monarch, and Physician to the Queen. Thomas was appointed Knight Commander of the Royal Victorian Order (KCVO) in the 2021 New Year Honours.

== Early life and education ==
Huw Thomas was born on 25 February 1958 in London, England. He was educated at Harrow School. He studied natural sciences at Trinity College, Cambridge, graduating with a Bachelor of Arts (BA) degree in 1979: following tradition, his BA was promoted to a Master of Arts (MA Cantab) degree. He then undertook further studies in medicine at the London Hospital Medical College, completing his Bachelor of Medicine, Bachelor of Surgery (MBBS) degree in 1982. He later undertook postgraduate research at the Imperial Cancer Research Fund and completed a Doctor of Philosophy (PhD) on molecular genetics of colorectal cancer in 1991 at University College London.

== Career ==
In 1994 Thomas was appointed consultant physician at St Mary's Hospital, London, and director of the Family Cancer Clinic at St Mark's Hospital, London. In 2007, he became professor of Gastrointestinal Genetics at Imperial College, London.

He is on the staff at King Edward VII's Hospital. In 2005 he was appointed physician to the Royal Household and in July 2014, head of the Medical Household, the medical section of the Royal Household of the British monarch, and Physician to the Queen. Thomas was appointed Knight Commander of the Royal Victorian Order (KCVO) in the 2021 New Year Honours.
