= Suckers (book) =

2008 book by Rose Shapiro

Suckers: How alternative medicine makes fools of us all
- Author: Rose Shapiro
- Language: English
- Subject: Alternative medicine
- Publisher: Harvill Secker
- Publication date: 2008
- Publication place: United Kingdom
- Pages: 304
- ISBN: 0-09-952286-1
- OCLC: 190777228

Suckers: How Alternative Medicine Makes Fools of Us All is a book about alternative medicine written by author and health journalist Rose Shapiro. It was published by Harvill Secker in 2008. It covers very similar ground to Simon Singh and Edzard Ernst's book Trick or Treatment?, but is written in a more journalistic and polemical style. It provides substantial detail regarding alternative treatments offered to cancer patients.

In the book, Shapiro stressed that homeopathy was not evidence-based medicine and said it should be removed from the National Health Service. Shapiro said that alternative medicine should be under “the same strictures as the pharmaceutical industry” and not be permitted to refer to treatments as 'food supplements'. She advised better enforcement of the Cancer Act, to protect patients from unscrupulous providers, and said the government should stop subsidizing universities that cover alternative medicine in their curriculum.

== Reception ==
Suckers was reviewed by several writers in 2008.

Writing for The Guardian in February, Steven Poole described Suckers as a "vigorous polemic" against alternative medicine with the key theme that its practices (such as homeopathy and ear candling) are "not just stupid but dangerous."

Damian Thompson reviewed Suckers for The Daily Telegraph and said that Shapiro “expertly describes the pathology of medical counter knowledge".

Natalie Haynes, writing in New Humanist, described the book as a "potted history of alternative medicine, as well as a thorough rebuttal of it, and her research is both fascinating and illuminating." Haynes said that Shapiro harbored the greatest anger for "snake-oil merchants who knowingly prey on the weak", in particular those with terminal cancer.

Boyd Tonkin, then the literary editor for The Independent, called the book a "ferocious assault" on proponents of alternative medicine that was a "bracing tonic" but he criticized the tone of the writing for its "sneery arrogance that (as with the Ayurvedic tradition) can only bother to caricature its few substantial foes."

In a joint review of Suckers and Trick or Treatment?, Olivia Laing said Suckers was a "troubling book" filled with horror stories of alternative practitioners where Shapiro "takes a delight in exposing alternative medicine's wackier tenets". Laing said the book's title "casts consumers as gullible and practitioners as vampiric in a way that many will find intensely irritating" while both books harbor "an acute awareness of the need for medicine to be evidence-based, a belief shared by the more sensible alternative practitioners."

Simon Singh, co-author of Trick or Treatment?, said that although he shared Shapiro's "general skepticism" and found the book an "interesting read" he noted two weaknesses. Singh said Shapiro takes a "very aggressive stance against alternative medicine" using a title that is designed to be hostile and second, that she "tends to focus on the truly wacky end of the alternative spectrum" and does not "devote enough space to more complex and subtle issues surrounding some of the more sensible forms of alternative medicine."
