= Homeopathy (journal) =

- Discipline: Homeopathy
- Language: English
- Edited by: Robert Mathie

Publication details
- Former name: British Homoeopathic Journal
- History: 1911–present
- Publisher: Thieme
- Frequency: Quarterly
- Impact factor: 1.818 (2021)

Standard abbreviations
- ISO 4: Homeopathy

Indexing
- ISSN: 1475-4916 (print); 1476-4245 (web)
- LCCN: 2002243387
- OCLC no.: 49958024

Links
- Journal homepage; Online access; Online archives of the British Homoeopathic Journal

Homeopathy is a peer-reviewed medical journal covering research, reviews, and debates on all aspects of homeopathy, a pseudoscientific form of alternative medicine. It is the official journal of the London-based Faculty of Homeopathy. The journal was established in 1911 as the British Homoeopathic Journal, resulting from a merger between the British Homoeopathic Review and the Journal of the British Homoeopathic Society. It uses its current name since 2001 and the editor-in-chief is Robert Mathie.

== Publisher ==
The journal was originally published by Nature Publishing Group, and was then published by Elsevier. Elsevier's decision to publish this journal has been called into question, given homeopathy's proven ineffectiveness and unscientific status. Elsevier's Vice President of Global Corporate Relations, Thomas Reller, has defended Elsevier's decision to publish the journal, saying that "We support debate around this topic". The journal has been published by Thieme Medical Publishers since 2018.

== Abstracting and indexing ==
The journal is abstracted and indexed in:

- CINAHL
- Current Contents/Clinical Medicine
- Embase/Excerpta Medica
- Index Medicus/MEDLINE/PubMed
- Science Citation Index Expanded
- Scopus

According to the Journal Citation Reports, the journal had a 2019 impact factor of 1.704. The journal's impact factor for 2015 was suppressed because of excessive self-citations.
