= Donald Barrett (businessman) =

American businessman

- Occupation: Businessman
- Known for: Founder and President of ITV Direct

Donald W. Barrett is the founder and president of ITV Direct, a company which produces infomercials for broadcast in the United States. Almost all are related to health and nutrition.

Barrett claims to market products that only, "positively impact people lives" " He has also promoted Lorraine Day, and other alternative medical practitioners. He founded ITV Ventures, an affiliate marketing company connected to his infomercial business. ITV closed on October 3, 2008.

On September 24, 2013, Barrett became the co-host of Unspoken Cures Radio, along with Matthew Ryncarz. Unspoken Cures Radio used to be known as Fusion Power Hour, and is broadcast on the Arena Sports Network.

== Controversy ==
On April 19, 2004, Barrett in his capacity as President of ITV Direct, Inc./Direct Marketing Concepts, Inc. received a Warning Letter from the Food and Drug Administration (FDA) notifying him that the product Supreme Greens was being marketed as an unlicensed drug with false or misleading claims. The letter requested that ITV Direct correct the deceptive practices.

In June 2004, the Federal Trade Commission (FTC) filed a lawsuit in the United States District Court for the District of Massachusetts alleging that Direct Marketing Concepts, Inc., ITV Direct, Inc., and their president, Donald W. Barrett had deceptively marketed Supreme Greens and Coral Calcium Daily by claiming that it could prevent, treat, and cure cancer, heart disease, arthritis, and diabetes. They also claimed it caused substantial weight loss, and was safe for use by pregnant women, children – including those as young as one year old, and persons taking any form of medication. In July 2004, ITV Direct was enjoined from marketing Supreme Greens.

On October 5, 2007, the FTC sued ITV Direct, Inc. and Donald Barrett for misrepresenting Kevin Trudeau's "Weight-Loss Cure" book in the infomercial they produced to market it.

On July 19, 2008, a federal judge ruled that two infomercials produced by Beverly, Massachusetts-based ITV Direct for "Coral Calcium" and "Supreme Greens" were deceptive and that the firm's owners are liable for restitution being sought by the Federal Trade Commission, which is seeking nearly $55 million. The judge also dismissed a countersuit filed by Barrett, ITV's president, who claimed the FTC was violating his First Amendment rights by taking him to court to force him to pull the ads.

On May 2, 2011, Barrett pleaded guilty to failing to report income and to selling a product touted as a disease preventative without approval from the FDA. He was scheduled to be sentenced on July 27, 2011. On September 29, 2011, he was sentenced to one year probation, three months of which he was to be confined to a community correction center. After that, he would be under house arrest for another three months and subject to electronic monitoring.
