= Albert T. W. Simeons =

Dr. Albert Theodore William Simeons (1900 in London – 1970 in Rome) was the leading proponent of a weight-loss protocol based on injections of human chorionic gonadotropin (hCG). In 1954, he published a book called "Pounds and Inches", and a paper in the Lancet on his theories.

Scientific consensus does not support Simeons's claims, finding no weight loss attributable to the use of hCG.

== Publications ==
- The Mask of a Lion, 1952 (a novel)
- Pounds & Inches a New Approach to Obesity, 1954
- Man's Presumptuous Brain: An Evolutionary Interpretation of Psychosomatic Disease, 1961
- Food: Facts, Foibles & Fables: The Origins of Human Nutrition, 1968
