= Richard Leach (physician) =

British physician and professor

Richard Mark Leach LVO is a British consultant physician and professor at Guy's and St Thomas’ NHS Foundation Trust, who is accredited in general, respiratory and critical care medicine. He has pioneered multiple respiratory care techniques and been instrumental in the development of numerous NICE guidelines relating to acute medicine. It has been reported that he led the care of British prime minister Boris Johnson during the 2020 COVID-19 pandemic.

== Career ==
Leach graduated from the School of Medical Sciences, University of Manchester in 1982 and became a lecturer in medicine at Guy’s and St Thomas’ Medical School, London, in 1989. He gained an MD in 1992 and undertook travelling fellowships with the British Thoracic Society and Medical Research Council at Johns Hopkins School of Medicine. In 1994 he was appointed consultant physician at Guy’s and St Thomas’ Hospital contributing to teaching respiratory and general medicine and clinical research throughout his career.

He is on the European Specialist Register for Intensive Care, Respiratory and General (Internal) Medicine and has published widely including a number of medical textbooks. In 1997 he became a Fellow of the Royal College of Physicians (FRCP).

Over his career he has been instrumental in numerous national medical committees, including the NHS Pathways Clinical Governance Committee, National Guideline Committee for Intravenous Fluid Administration in Adults, NCEPOD reports, General (Internal) Medicine and Respiratory Specialty Training Committees and RCP Medical Specialty and Nutrition Committees.

In 2006 he was appointed clinical lead for acute medicine at Guy’s and St Thomas’ Hospital and subsequently clinical director from 2009 to 2018 achieving ‘outstanding’ ratings in CQC assessments in 2016 and 2019.

He was awarded an honorary professorship in medicine at King’s College London in 2022. Concurrently with his positions at Guys and St Thomas’ NHS Trust he was deputy medical director at Medway Foundation Trust as part of National Health Service Improvement (NHSI) support (‘buddying’) team from 2015 to 2018.

He was clinical director for pulmonary, critical care and sleep medicine in 2018 to 2022 and medical director from 2021 to 2023.

Leach was joint head of the Royal Medical Household for Clarence House from 2014 to 2022 and has been the king's physician since 2022.

== Selected publications ==
- Critical Care Medicine at a Glance (2014).
- The Respiratory System at a Glance (2015).
- The Oxford Desk Reference of Acute Medicine (2016).
- RM Leach, Treacher DF. The pulmonary physician in critical care 2: oxygen delivery and consumption in the critically ill. Thorax 2002;57:170-7.
- RM Leach, DW Sheehan, VP Chacko, JT Sylvester. Energy state, pH, and vasomotor tone during hypoxia in precontracted pulmonary and femoral arteries. Am. J. Physiol. (Lung Cell Mol Physiol) 2000;278:L294-L304.
- NT Bateman, RM Leach. Acute Oxygen Therapy. ABC of Oxygen. BMJ 1998;317:798-801.
