= Perfusion (journal) =

Academic journal of cardiology

- Discipline: Cardiology & Cardiovascular Medicine
- Language: English
- Edited by: Prakash P. Punjabi

Publication details
- History: 1986-present
- Publisher: SAGE Publications
- Frequency: Bi-monthly
- Impact factor: 1.442 (2015)

Standard abbreviations
- ISO 4: Perfusion

Indexing
- ISSN: 0267-6591 (print); 1477-111X (web)
- OCLC no.: 42423033

Links
- Journal homepage; Online access; Online archive

Perfusion is a peer-reviewed academic journal that publishes papers in the field of cardiology. The journal's editor is Prakash P. Punjabi (Hammersmith Hospital). It has been in publication since 1986 and is currently published by SAGE Publications.

== Scope ==
Perfusion is a multidisciplinary journal that provides current information on all aspects of perfusion, oxygenation and biocompatibility and their use in modern cardiac surgery. The journal publishes research, selected papers and collaborative ventures and aims to be practical and directly relevant to the working perfusionist. Perfusion also contains research and reports on the latest treatment and innovations.

== Abstracting and indexing ==
Perfusion is abstracted and indexed in, among other databases: SCOPUS, and the Social Sciences Citation Index. According to the Journal Citation Reports, its 2010 impact factor is 0.745, ranking it 58 out of 66 journals in the category ‘Peripheral Vascular Disease’.
