= The College of Medicine (UK) =

British alternative medicine organization

The College of Medicine (CoM), previously known as The College of Integrated Health, is a United Kingdom-based organization incorporated in November of 2009. It grew out of The Prince's Foundation for Integrated Health after it was shut down due to accounting fraud. It registered as a charity in January of 2012.

It is chaired by Michael Dixon, a former director of the Foundation. In March 2025 Sam Everington, a general practitioner at the Bromley by Bow Centre, became co-chair alongside Dixon. It promotes alternative medicine. Former director George Lewith was a council member of the Foundation - his research unit at the University of Southampton played an important role in the development of the foundation.

During its launched, several commentators writing in the Guardian and the BMJ, expressed the opinion it was simply a re-branding of the Prince's Foundation, some describing it as "Hamlet without the Prince".
