= Faculty of Homeopathy =

British association promoting homeopathy

Faculty of Homœopathy Act 1950
- Act of Parliament
- Parliament of the United Kingdom
- Long title: An Act to incorporate and confer powers upon the Faculty of Homœopathy and for other purposes.
- Citation: 14 Geo. 6. c. xx

Dates
- Royal assent: 12 July 1950

Status: Current legislation

Text of statute as originally enacted

The Faculty of Homeopathy was formed in 1944 from the British Homeopathic Society (founded in 1844). It was incorporated by the Faculty of Homeopathy Act 1950, which confers an educational function on the Faculty. The Faculty promotes the development of homeopathy.

Homeopathy is a form of alternative medicine that is generally considered ineffective and a form of pseudoscience. Prince Charles became a patron of the organisation in 2019.

== Membership ==
The Faculty claims "over 500 members worldwide". Membership is open to statutorily registered healthcare professionals with student membership available to undergraduates in medical courses.

== Training ==
Faculty-Accredited courses in homeopathy are taught at four locations in the UK and four overseas. After specified training periods, students are eligible to sit for the specialist examinations, which lead to the Faculty's qualifications: LFHom, MFHom (for dentists, doctors, nurses, pharmacists and podiatrists), VetMFHom (for veterinary surgeons) and DFHom (for pharmacists and podiatrists). The qualifications do not themselves confer any legal qualification to practice homeopathy.

== Publications ==
The Faculty publishes Homeopathy (formerly the British Homoeopathic Journal).

Simile is a regular newsletter for members.
