= Edzard Ernst =

German academic physician and researcher (born 1948)

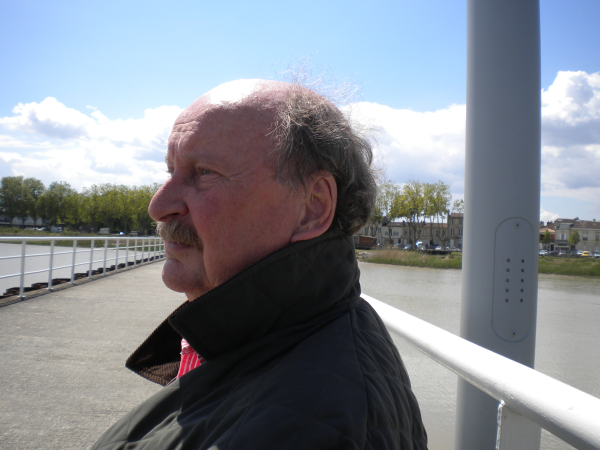
- Edzard Ernst
- Born: 30 January 1948 (age 78); Wiesbaden, Germany
- Education: LMU Munich
- Known for: Scientific study of alternative medicine
- Awards: John Maddox Prize 2015
- Scientific career
- Workplaces: University of Exeter
- Edzard Ernst's voice recorded September 2015
- Website: edzardernst.com

Edzard Ernst (born 30 January 1948) is a retired British-German academic physician and researcher specialising in the critical study of complementary and alternative medicine. He was Professor of Complementary Medicine at the University of Exeter, the world's first such academic position in complementary and alternative medicine.

Ernst served as chairman of Physical Medicine and Rehabilitation (PMR) at the University of Vienna, but left this position in 1993 to set up the department of Complementary Medicine at the University of Exeter in England. He became director of complementary medicine of the Peninsula Medical School (PMS) in 2002. Ernst was the first occupant of the Laing chair in Complementary Medicine, retiring in 2011. He was born and trained in Germany, where he began his medical career at a homoeopathic hospital in Munich, and since 1999 has been a British citizen.

Ernst is the founder of two medical journals: Focus on Alternative and Complementary Therapies (of which he was editor-in-chief until it was discontinued in 2016) and Perfusion. Ernst's writing appeared in a regular column in The Guardian, where he reviewed news stories about complementary medicine from an evidence-based medicine perspective. Since his research began on alternative modalities, Ernst has been seen as "the scourge of alternative medicine" for publishing critical research that exposes methods that lack documentation of efficacy. In 2015 he was awarded the John Maddox Prize, sponsored jointly by Sense about Science and Nature, for courage in standing up for science.

== Early life ==
Ernst was born in Wiesbaden, Germany, in 1948. As a child, his family doctor was a homeopath, and at the time he saw it as part of medicine. His father and grandfather were both physicians, and his mother was a laboratory assistant. Ernst originally wanted to be a musician, but his mother persuaded him that medicine might be a good "sideline" career for him to pursue.

== Training and early career ==
Ernst qualified as a doctor in Germany in 1978 where he also completed his M.D. and Ph.D. theses. He has received training in acupuncture, autogenic training, herbalism, homoeopathy, massage therapy and spinal manipulation. He learned homeopathy, acupuncture and other modalities whilst at a homeopathic hospital in Munich, when he began his medical career. In 1988, he became Professor in Physical Medicine and Rehabilitation (PMR) at Hannover Medical School and in 1990 Head of the PMR Department at the University of Vienna.

== Work in complementary medicine ==
The world's first professor of complementary medicine, Ernst researches complementary medicine with an emphasis on efficacy and safety. His research mainly surveys systematic reviews and meta-analyses of clinical trials; the institute has not performed a clinical trial for some time due to budget constraints. He has over 700 papers published in scientific journals. He has said that about five per cent of alternative medicine is backed by evidence, with the remainder being either insufficiently studied or backed by evidence showing lack of efficacy.

Ernst's department at Exeter defined complementary medicine as "diagnosis, treatment and/or prevention which complements mainstream medicine by contributing to a common whole, by satisfying a demand not met by orthodoxy or by diversifying the conceptual frameworks of medicine."

Ernst asserts that complementary techniques are mostly practised by qualified physicians in Germany and Austria whereas they are mainly practised by others in the UK. He also argues that the term "complementary and alternative medicine" (CAM) is an almost nonsensical umbrella term and that distinctions between its modalities must be made.

Since his research began on alternative modalities, Ernst has been seen as "the scourge of alternative medicine" for publishing critical research. In a 2008 publication in the British Journal of General Practice, he listed treatments that "demonstrably generate more good than harm", identifying only acupuncture for nausea and osteoarthritis; aromatherapy as a palliative treatment for cancer; hypnosis for labour pain; massage, music therapy, relaxation therapy for anxiety and insomnia; and some plant extracts such as St John's wort for depression; hawthorn for congestive heart failure; and guar gum for diabetes.

In our book More Good Than Harm? ... ethicist Kevin Smith and I discuss the many ethical issues around alternative medicine and essentially conclude that it is not possible to practice alternative medicine ethically.

Ernst presented at the first Global Congress on Scientific Thinking and Action, which took place on 17–20 March 2021. He spoke about the risks and dangers of alternative medicine, pointing to homoeopathy and chiropractic as the most problematic areas within alternative medicine at the time.

== Smallwood Report ==
In 2005, a report by the economist Christopher Smallwood, personally commissioned by Prince Charles, claimed that complementary and alternative medicine was cost-effective and should be available in the National Health Service (NHS). Ernst was initially enlisted as a collaborator on the report, but asked for his name to be removed after a sight of the draft report convinced him that Smallwood had "written the conclusions before looking at the evidence". The report did not address whether CAM treatments were actually effective and Ernst described it as "complete misleading rubbish".

Ernst was, in turn, criticised by The Lancet editor Richard Horton for disclosing contents of the report while it was still in draft form. In a 29 August 2005 letter to The Times Horton wrote: "Professor Ernst seems to have broken every professional code of scientific behaviour by disclosing correspondence referring to a document that is in the process of being reviewed and revised prior to publication. This breach of confidence is to be deplored."

Prince Charles' private secretary, Sir Michael Peat, also filed a complaint regarding breached confidentiality with Exeter University. Although he was "cleared of wrongdoing", Ernst has said that circumstances surrounding the ensuing university investigation led to his retirement.

In the 1 January 2006 edition of the British Journal of General Practice, Ernst gave a detailed criticism of the report.

== Trick or Treatment ==
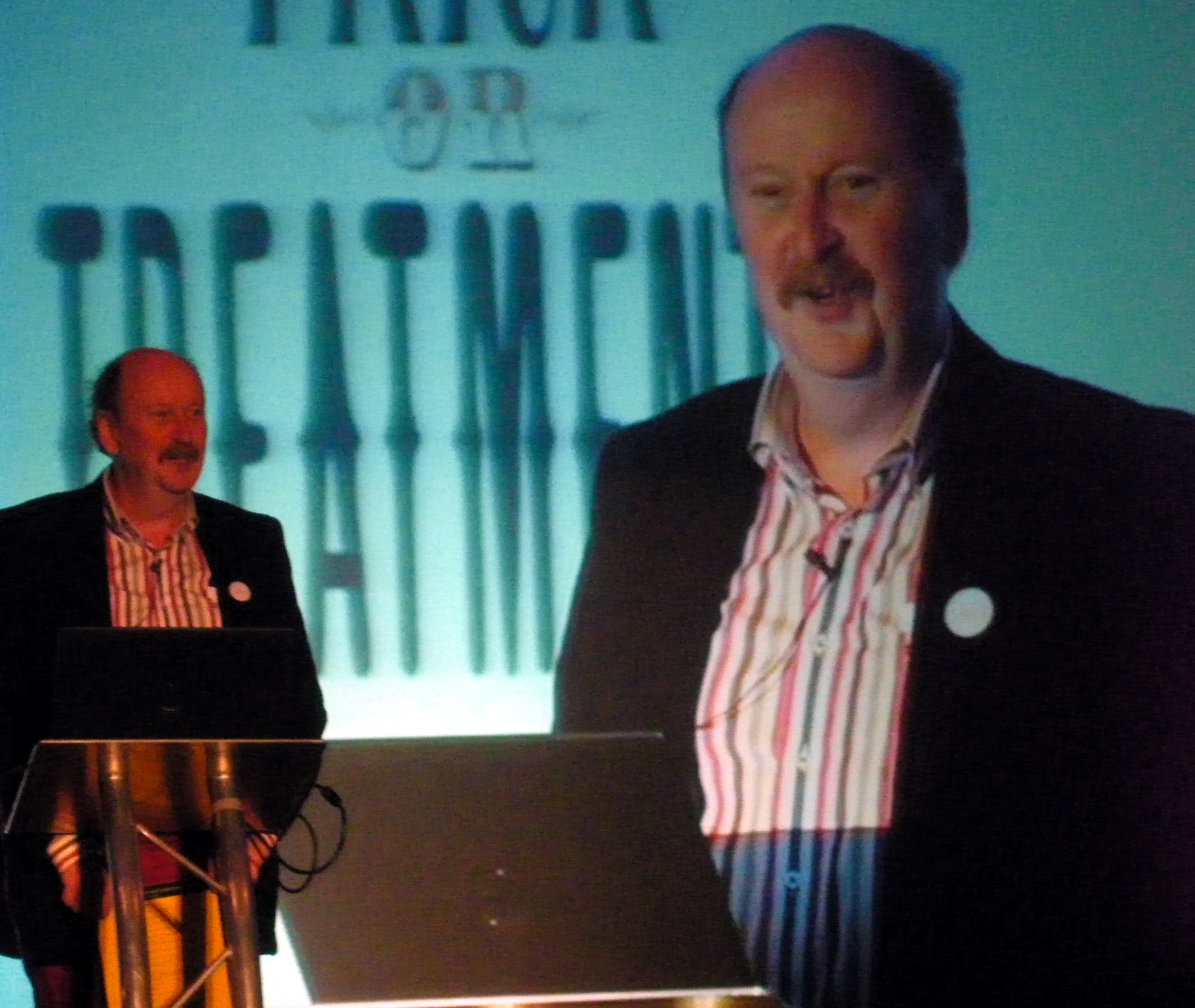
Ernst lecturing about Trick or Treatment in 2012

In 2008, Ernst and Simon Singh published Trick or Treatment? Alternative Medicine on Trial. The authors challenged the Prince of Wales, to whom the book is (ironically) dedicated, and The Prince's Foundation for Integrated Health on alleged misrepresentation of "scientific evidence about therapies such as homeopathy, acupuncture and reflexology". They asserted that Britons spent £500 million each year on unproven or disproven alternative therapies. In a review of Trick or Treatment in the New England Journal of Medicine, Donald Marcus described Ernst as "one of the best qualified people to summarize the evidence on this topic."

In 2008, Ernst sent an open letter urging the Royal Pharmaceutical Society of Great Britain to crack down on high street chemists that sell homoeopathic remedies without warning that the remedies lack evidence for claimed biological effects. According to him, this disinformation would be a violation of their ethical code:

My plea is simply for honesty. Let people buy what they want, but tell them the truth about what they are buying. These treatments are biologically implausible and the clinical tests have shown they don't do anything at all in human beings. The argument that this information is not relevant or important for customers is quite simply ridiculous.

In a 2008 interview with Media Life Magazine, when he and Simon Singh were asked this question—"What do you think the future is for alternative medicine?"—they replied:

For us, there is no such thing as alternative medicine. There is either medicine that is effective or not, medicine that is safe or not. So-called alternative therapies need to be assessed and then classified as good medicines or bogus medicines. Hopefully, in the future, the good medicines will be embraced within conventional medicine and the bogus medicines will be abandoned.

In a 2009 article entitled "Should We Maintain an Open Mind about Homeopathy?" published in the American Journal of Medicine, Ernst and Michael Baum—writing to other physicians—offered strong criticism of homeopathy:

Homeopathy is among the worst examples of faith-based medicine. ... These axioms [of homeopathy] are not only out of line with scientific facts but also directly opposed to them. If homeopathy is correct, much of physics, chemistry, and pharmacology must be incorrect.... To have an open mind about homeopathy or similarly implausible forms of alternative medicine (e.g., Bach flower remedies, spiritual healing, crystal therapy) is therefore not an option.

== More Harm Than Good? ==
In 2018, Ernst and co-author Kevin Smith, a medical ethicist, published the book More Harm Than Good? The Moral Maze of Complementary and Alternative Medicine.

In a review of the book for Skeptical Inquirer, Harriet Hall called Ernst the "world's foremost expert on the claims and the evidence (or lack thereof) for Complementary and Alternative Medicine (CAM)." Hall said that Ernst and Smith direct their attention to the ethicists and the scientific community for this book with the goal "to inform, not to entertain. It is not an easy or 'fun' read, but it's an important one".

Dougal Jeffries, writing for the British Journal of General Practice, said the book was "replete with both theoretical and real-life examples and is thoroughly referenced, but is a rather turgid read. It clearly demonstrates the extraordinary capacity of intelligent beings, including both practitioners and patients, to hold to irrational beliefs in the face of contrary evidence, but the authors show little sympathy for this very human tendency."

== Early retirement from Exeter ==
Ernst was accused by Prince Charles' private secretary of having breached a confidentiality agreement regarding the 2005 Smallwood report. After being subjected to a "very unpleasant" investigation by the University of Exeter, the university "accepted his innocence but continued, in his view, to treat him as 'persona non grata'. All fundraising for his unit ceased, forcing him to use up its core funding and allow its 15 staff to drift away."

Writing in 2022, after Charles' accession to the throne, Ernst said, "There never was a formal confidentiality agreement with signature etc. But I did feel bound to keep the contents of the Smallwood report confidential. The investigation by my University was not just 'very unpleasant', it was also far too long. It lasted 13 months! I had to take lawyers against my own University! In addition, it was unnecessary, not least because a University should simply establish the facts and, if reasonable, defend its professor from outside attacks. The facts could have been established over a cup of tea with the Vice Chancellor in less than half an hour. When my department had been destroyed in the process, I retired voluntarily and was subsequently re-employed for half a year to help find a successor. In retrospect, I see this move as a smart ploy by the University to keep me sweet and prevent me from going to the press. A successor was never hired; one good candidate was found but he was told that he had to find 100% of the funds to do the job. Nobody of high repute would have found this acceptable, and thus the only good candidate was not even tempted to accept the position."

He retired in 2011, two years ahead of his official retirement. In July 2011, a Reuters article described his "long-running dispute with the Prince about the merits of alternative therapies" and stated that he "accused Britain's heir-to-the-throne Prince Charles and other backers of alternative therapies on Monday of being 'snake-oil salesmen' who promote products with no scientific basis", and that the dispute "had cost him his job – a claim Prince Charles's office denied". According to Ernst, "The snake oil salesman story is an entirely separate issue", which "happened years later." He added, "It is true that Charles's office denied that Charles knew about his 1st private secretary writing to my Vice Chancellor asking him to investigate my alleged breach of confidence." Ernst claims that as Sir Michael Peat wrote his letter in his capacity as the Prince's private secretary, Ernst finds that "exceedingly hard to believe."

Ernst's book, Charles, the Alternative Prince: An Unauthorised Biography, was published in February 2022. It focuses on Charles's interest in alternative medicine, with a critical assessment of his views. In 2009, Ernst's name appeared on a list of supporters of Republic – an organisation which campaigns for the abolition of the British monarchy. However, writing on his website in 2022, Ernst clarified his position: "Even though Charles did a sterling job in trying, I did not become a republican. I do have considerable doubts that Charles will be a good King (his reign might even be the end of the monarchy), and I did help the republican cause on several occasions but I never formally joined any such group (in general, I am not a joiner of parties, clubs or interest groups)."

== Other work and recognition ==
In a May 1995 Annals of Internal Medicine publication, Ernst detailed the Nazi "cleansing" of the University of Vienna medical faculty that allowed the "medical atrocities" of Nazi human experimentation.

In 2001, Ernst sat on the Scientific Committee on Herbal Medicinal Products of the Irish Medicines Board. In 2005, he was a member of the Medicines Commission of the British Medicines Control Agency (now part of the Medicines and Healthcare products Regulatory Agency) which determines which substances may be introduced and promoted as medicine. In 2008, he was an external examiner for several university medical schools in several countries. He is a Founding Member and on the Board of the Institute for Science in Medicine, formed in 2009 and was elected a Fellow of the Academy of Medical Sciences in 2009.

In February 2011, Ernst was elected as a Fellow of the Committee for Skeptical Inquiry. He was editor-in-chief of the journal Focus on Alternative and Complementary Therapies which he founded in 1995 and which was discontinued in 2016.

In 2015, Ernst was one of two recipients of the John Maddox Prize, sponsored jointly by Sense about Science and Nature, for courage in standing up for science.

== Books ==
- Homeopathy: A Critical Appraisal (with Eckhart G. Hahn). Butterworth-Heinemann 1998. ISBN 0-7506-3564-9, 240 pages
- The Desktop Guide to Complementary and Alternative Medicine: An Evidence-based Approach. Elsevier Health Sciences 2006, ISBN 978-0-7234-3383-5, 556 pages
- Complementary Therapies for Pain Management. An Evidence-Based Approach. Elsevier Science 2007. ISBN 978-0-7234-3400-9, 349 pages
- The Oxford Handbook of Complementary Medicine. Oxford University Press 2008. ISBN 978-0-19-920677-3, 448 pages
- Trick or Treatment? Alternative Medicine on Trial (with Simon Singh). Transworld Publisher 2008. ISBN 978-0-593-06129-9, 416 pages (The same book published in the US is called Trick or Treatment: The Undeniable Facts about Alternative Medicine).
- Healing, Hype, Or Harm?: Scientists Investigate Complementary Or Alternative Medicine. (ed.) Imprint Academic 2008, ISBN 978-1-84540-118-4, 120 pages
- A Scientist in Wonderland: A Memoir of Searching for Truth and Finding Trouble. Imprint Academic 2015. ISBN 978-1845407773, 173 pages
- Homeopathy - The Undiluted Facts : Including a Comprehensive A-Z Lexicon. Springer 2018. ISBN 978-3319435909, 151 pages
- More Harm than Good?: The Moral Maze of Complementary and Alternative Medicine with Kevin Smith. Springer 2018 ISBN 978-3319699400, 223 pages
- SCAM: So-Called Alternative Medicine. (Societas) Imprint Academic 2018, ISBN 978-1845409708, 225 pages
- Don't Believe What You Think: Arguments for and against SCAM. (Societas) Ingram Book Company 2020. ISBN 9781788360081, 261 pages
- Chiropractic: Not All That It's Cracked Up to Be. Springer 2021. ISBN 978-3030531171, 206 pages
- Alternativmedizin - was hilft, was schadet: Die 20 besten, die 20 bedenklichsten Methoden. Gräfe und Unzer 2021. ISBN 978-3833877933, 224 pages
- So-Called Alternative Medicine (SCAM) for Cancer. Springer 2021. ISBN 978-3030741570, 232 pages
- Charles, The Alternative Prince: An Unauthorised Biography. Societas 2022. ISBN 978-1788360708, 210 pages
- Charles, The Alternative King: An Unauthorised Biography. Societas 2023. ISBN 978-1788361064, 216 pages
- Bizarre Medical Ideas: ... and the Strange Men Who Invented Them, Springer 2024, ISBN 978-3031551017, 255 pages
