= Natural Cures "They" Don't Want You to Know About =

2005 book by Kevin Trudeau

- Updated edition
- Author: Kevin Trudeau
- Language: English
- Publisher: Self-Published
- Publication date: 2005
- Publication place: United States

Natural Cures "They" Don't Want You To Know About is a 2005 self-published book by American author Kevin Trudeau, promoting various purported non-drug and non-surgical cures for many diseases, primarily in support of his business selling such products. Trudeau accuses pharmaceutical companies and the United States government of censoring these products and methods on the basis that it would cut into their profit margin. The book is the subject of widespread allegations of fraud, and part of what the American Association for the Advancement of Science has called Trudeau's "snake oil empire".

== Premise ==
In the book, Trudeau claims that there are all-natural cures for serious illnesses including cancer, herpes, arthritis, AIDS, acid reflux disease, various phobias, depression, obesity, diabetes, multiple sclerosis, lupus, chronic fatigue syndrome, attention deficit disorder, muscular dystrophy, and that these are being deliberately hidden and suppressed from the public by the Food and Drug Administration (FDA), the Federal Trade Commission, and the major food and drug companies, in an effort to protect the profits of these industries and the authority of the governmental agencies. Trudeau claims that the source of illness are toxins from processed food, nutritional deficiencies, and other environmental sources; and that eliminating these factors will facilitate a cure for most diseases. Trudeau claims that his lack of medical training or expertise is what makes him most qualified to investigate alternative medicine, and reports his opinions in his self-published book. The first edition of the book lacked any mention of specific, brand-name products for any illnesses within its pages, as Trudeau claims the FDA and FTC censored this information and prohibited him from publishing it in the book. Instead, the book contained references to Trudeau's subscription-based website where the actual 'cures' were supposedly posted and accessible for a monthly fee.

In May 2006, Trudeau self-published More Natural "Cures" Revealed: Previously Censored Brand Name Products That Cure Disease. This book responded to complaints that its earlier version did not actually contain any cures but pointed consumers to his subscription website. In More Natural "Cures" Revealed, Trudeau says that workers at the FDA and FTC want to censor him and, figuratively, burn his books.

== Versions ==
The original book contained 271 pages. After he released More Natural "Cures" Revealed: Previously Censored Brand Name Products That Cure Disease in response to earlier criticism, an "Updated Edition" of the original Natural Cures was sold shortly thereafter, containing 563 pages. This adds a new Introduction, a Frequently Asked Questions chapter and a chapter on website information. It also adds three appendices, containing newsletter articles, "No-Hunger Bread: A True FDA Horror Story," and locations of several health care practitioners. The FDA article, originally a short letter and summary of the case in the original book, is included in its entirety in the updated edition. One omission in the updated edition is a Glossary section containing several New Age techniques.

According to Trudeau, the chapter "The Cures For All Diseases" was completely censored by the FTC in the original book. The chapter is included titled as "Natural Cures for Specific Diseases" in the updated edition.

His website contains a number of references and articles, notably "FDA Horror Stories" such as "No-Hunger Bread," which describe alleged instances of the FDA suppressing natural cures. Another article addresses 714X, a disproven cancer treatment developed in Canada.

== Criticism ==
The book has been the focus of much controversy since its publication, with widespread allegations of fraud. The New York State Consumer Protection Board issued a warning in 2005 that the book "does not contain the 'natural cures' for cancer and other diseases that Trudeau is promising." It asserted that "Trudeau is not only misrepresenting the contents of his self-published book, he is also using false endorsements to encourage consumers to buy Natural Cures "They" Don't Want You to Know About." The Board also alleged that Trudeau was selling the consumer's contact information to other marketers without their consent and hitting purchasers with unauthorized charges.

Skeptical author Michael Shermer writes:

As for the "natural cures" themselves, some are not cures at all but just obvious healthy lifestyle suggestions: eat less, exercise more, reduce stress. Some of the natural cures are flat-out wrong, such as oral chelation for heart disease, whereas others are laughably ludicrous, such as a magnetic mattress pad and crocodile protein peptide for fibromyalgia. Worst of all are the natural cures that the book directs the reader to Trudeau's Web page to find. When you go there, however, and click on a disease to get the cure, you first have to become a Web site member at $1000 lifetime or $9.95 a month. It is a classic con man's combo: bait and switch (the book directs them to the Web page) and double-dipping (sell them the book, then sell them the membership).

Shermer and other critics have argued that Trudeau has used Natural Cures to circumvent a Federal Trade Commission ruling that Trudeau is barred "from appearing in, producing, or disseminating future infomercials that advertise any type of product, service, or program to the public." The FTC issued the decision after it found that Trudeau had defrauded consumers by making numerous false claims about his merchandise in infomercials.

Others have criticized the book for making such broad claims as, "If your body is alkaline, you cannot get cancer [...] and if you have cancer, it goes away."

The book makes extensive unreferenced claims that some drugs cause such conditions as AIDS, headaches, bloating, indigestion, heartburn, nausea, allergies, asthma, fibromyalgia, arthritis, diabetes, constipation, yeast infections, dandruff, acne, halitosis, fatigue, depression, stress, and inability to lose weight.
