= The Prince's Foundation for Integrated Health =

Health charity founded by Charles, Prince of Wales

The Prince's Foundation for Integrated Health (FIH) was a charity run by King Charles III (then Prince of Wales) founded in 1993. The foundation promoted complementary and alternative medicine, preferring to use the term "integrated health", and lobbied for its inclusion in the National Health Service. The charity closed in 2010 after allegations of fraud and money laundering led to the arrest of a former official.

== History ==
The charity was established in 1993 to explore "how safe, proven complementary therapies can work in conjunction with mainstream medicine".

Michael Dixon was appointed the foundation's medical director. From 2005 to 2007, FIH received a grant from the Department of Health to help organise the self-regulation of complementary therapies. There had been concern that with a large proportion of the public turning to complementary approaches, there were few safeguards in place to ensure that non-statutorily regulated therapists were safe, trained and would act in an appropriate way. FIH worked to bring together the representative bodies of many complementary professions to talk and agree standards. The result was the formation of the Complementary and Natural Healthcare Council (CNHC) which had hoped to register 10,000 practitioners of complementary medicine by the end of 2009 but which by September 2009 had succeeded in enrolling less than a tenth of that number due to lack of interest on the part of some of their professional associations. The Department of Health is currently continuing to fund the CNHC but future funding will be dependent on substantial progress being made towards the target (which has now been reduced to 2,000). Alternative medicine campaigners argued that the move toward regulation conferred undue respectability on unproven and possibly unsafe complementary & alternative medicine (CAM) approaches.

FIH also worked with medical schools to increase the understanding of complementary approaches amongst new doctors and ran an annual awards ceremony for integrated health schemes both within the medical world and in the community.

The papers of the Foundation for Integrated Health are held at the Wellcome Library, Archives and Manuscripts, and are available for consultation by appointment. Further details about the collection can be found on the Wellcome online catalogue.

== Controversy ==
The Prince of Wales has demonstrated an interest in alternative medicine, the promotion of which has occasionally resulted in controversy. In 2004, the foundation divided the scientific and medical community over its campaign encouraging general practitioners to offer herbal and other alternative treatments to National Health Service patients, and in May 2006, The Prince made a speech to an audience of health ministers from various countries at the World Health Assembly in Geneva, urging them to develop a plan for integrating conventional and alternative medicine.

In April 2008, The Times published a letter from Professor Edzard Ernst that asked the Prince's Foundation to recall two guides promoting "alternative medicine", saying: "the majority of alternative therapies appear to be clinically ineffective, and many are downright dangerous." A speaker for the foundation countered the criticism by stating: "We entirely reject the accusation that our online publication Complementary Healthcare: A Guide contains any misleading or inaccurate claims about the benefits of complementary therapies. On the contrary, it treats people as adults and takes a responsible approach by encouraging people to look at reliable sources of information... so that they can make informed decisions. The foundation does not promote complementary therapies." In June 2008 Ernst and science writer Simon Singh book Trick or Treatment: Alternative Medicine on Trial was published. It is ironically dedicated to "HRH the Prince of Wales" and the last chapter is highly critical of his advocacy of "complementary" and "alternative" treatments.

The Prince's Duchy Originals have produced a variety of CAM products including a "Detox Tincture" that Ernst has denounced as "financially exploiting the vulnerable" and "outright quackery". In May 2009, the Advertising Standards Authority criticised an email that Duchy Originals had sent out to advertise its Echina-Relief, Hyperi-Lift and Detox Tinctures products saying it was misleading.

In Ernst's book More Good Than Harm? The Moral Maze of Complementary and Alternative Medicine he and ethicist Kevin Smith call Charles "foolish and immoral" and state that "it is not possible to practice alternative medicine ethically". Ernst said the Prince's private secretary contacted the vice chancellor of Exeter University to investigate Ernst's complaints against the "Smallwood Report", commissioned by the prince in 2005. Ernst said he was found not guilty, but that "all local support at Exeter stopped, which eventually led to my early retirement."

== Funding ==
Between 2005 and 2007 the charity's annual turnover was about £1.2 million. In 2007 it received significant funding from The Prince's Charities Foundation, and a £300,000 grant from the Department of Health for the regulation of complementary medicine.

== Lobbying allegations ==
The Prince personally wrote at least seven letters to the Medicines and Healthcare products Regulatory Agency (MHRA) shortly before they relaxed the rules governing labelling of herbal products such as the ones sold by his duchy, a move that has been widely condemned by scientists and medical bodies.

On 31 October 2009 it was reported that the Prince had personally lobbied Health Secretary Andy Burnham regarding greater provision of alternative treatments on the NHS.

== Charity Commission complaint ==
In March 2010, the political organisation Republic, which campaigns for an elected head of state, registered a complaint with the Charity Commission for England and Wales over a possible breach of charity regulations, suggesting that the foundation's staff had pursued a public vendetta against Ernst.

== Fraud allegations and closure ==
In 2010, following accounting irregularities noted by the foundation's auditor, it was reported that the Metropolitan Police Economic and Specialist Crime Command had begun an inquiry into alleged fraud. Within weeks, two former officials at the Prince's Foundation were arrested for fraud believed to total £300,000. Four days later, on 30 April 2010, the foundation announced that it would close. The foundation stated that its closure was the result of the fraud allegations.

The charity's finance director, accountant George Gray, was convicted of theft totalling £253,000 and sentenced to three years in prison.

== Rebranding as "The College of Medicine" ==
Following the disbanding of the Prince's Foundation, many of the individuals and organisations involved launched a new organisation in late 2010 called The College of Medicine, with which the Prince of Wales was not overtly involved. Several commentators writing in The Guardian and The British Medical Journal, have expressed the opinion that the new organisation is simply a re-branding of the Prince's Foundation, describing it as "Hamlet without the Prince".

In support of this connection with the then Prince, alternative medicine critic and pharmacologist David Colquhoun has argued that the college (originally called "The College of Integrated Health") is extremely well-funded and seemed from the beginning to be very confident of the Prince's support; explicitly describing its mission as "to take forward the vision of HRH the Prince of Wales".

These claims have been contested by the college.
