= Rose Shapiro =

British writer

Rose Shapiro is a British writer who contributes regularly to several publications including The Independent, The Observer, The Guardian, Time Out, Good Housekeeping and the Health Service Journal. She wrote the book Suckers: How Alternative Medicine Makes Fools of Us All.

She lives in Bristol and has two daughters, Isabel and Judith. Her late husband Sam Organ was a television producer for BBC Bristol.

== Books ==
Suckers: How alternative medicine makes fools of us all, Vintage Books 2008, ISBN 978-1-84655-028-7
