= List of honorary medical staff at King Edward VII's Hospital for Officers =

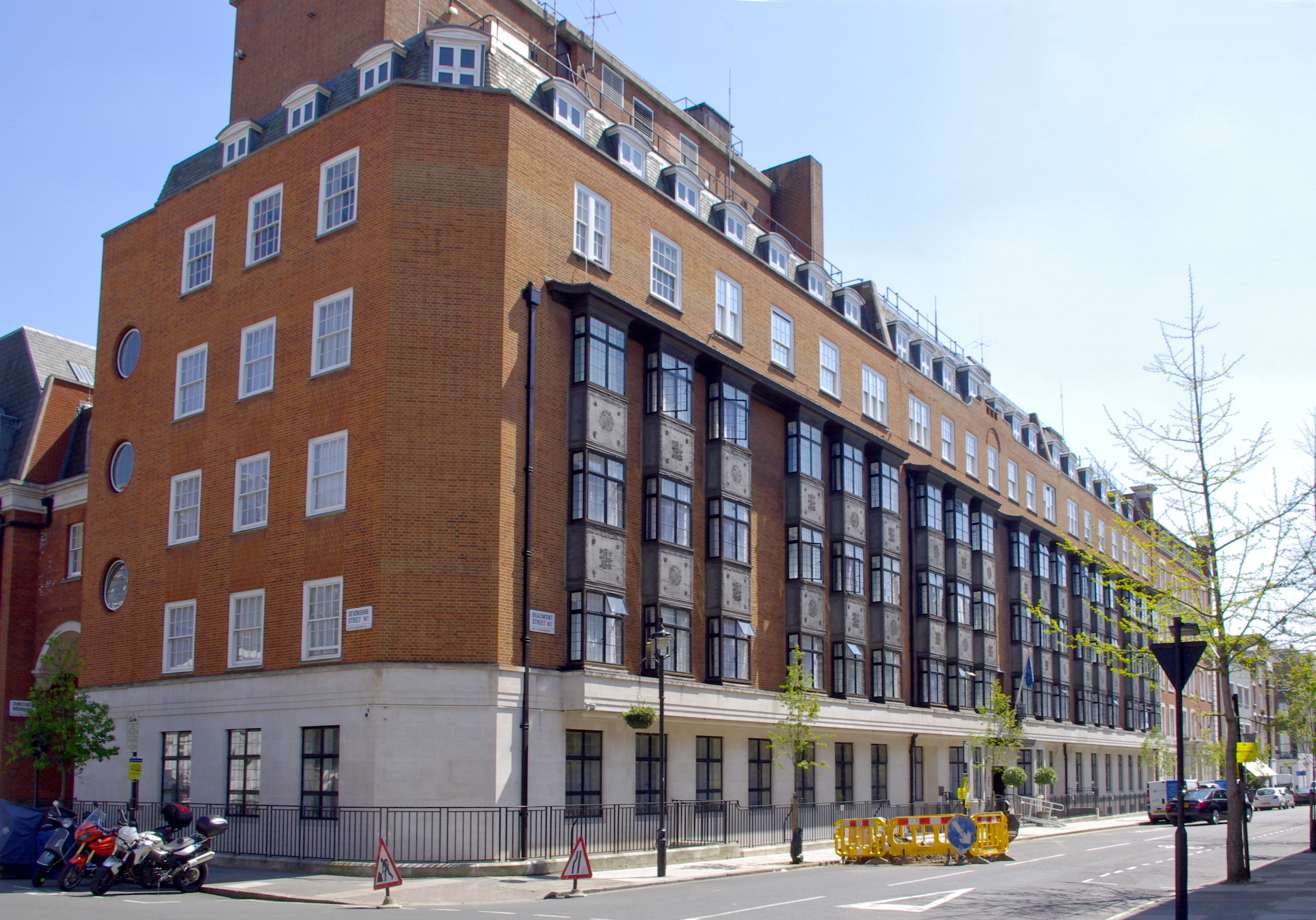
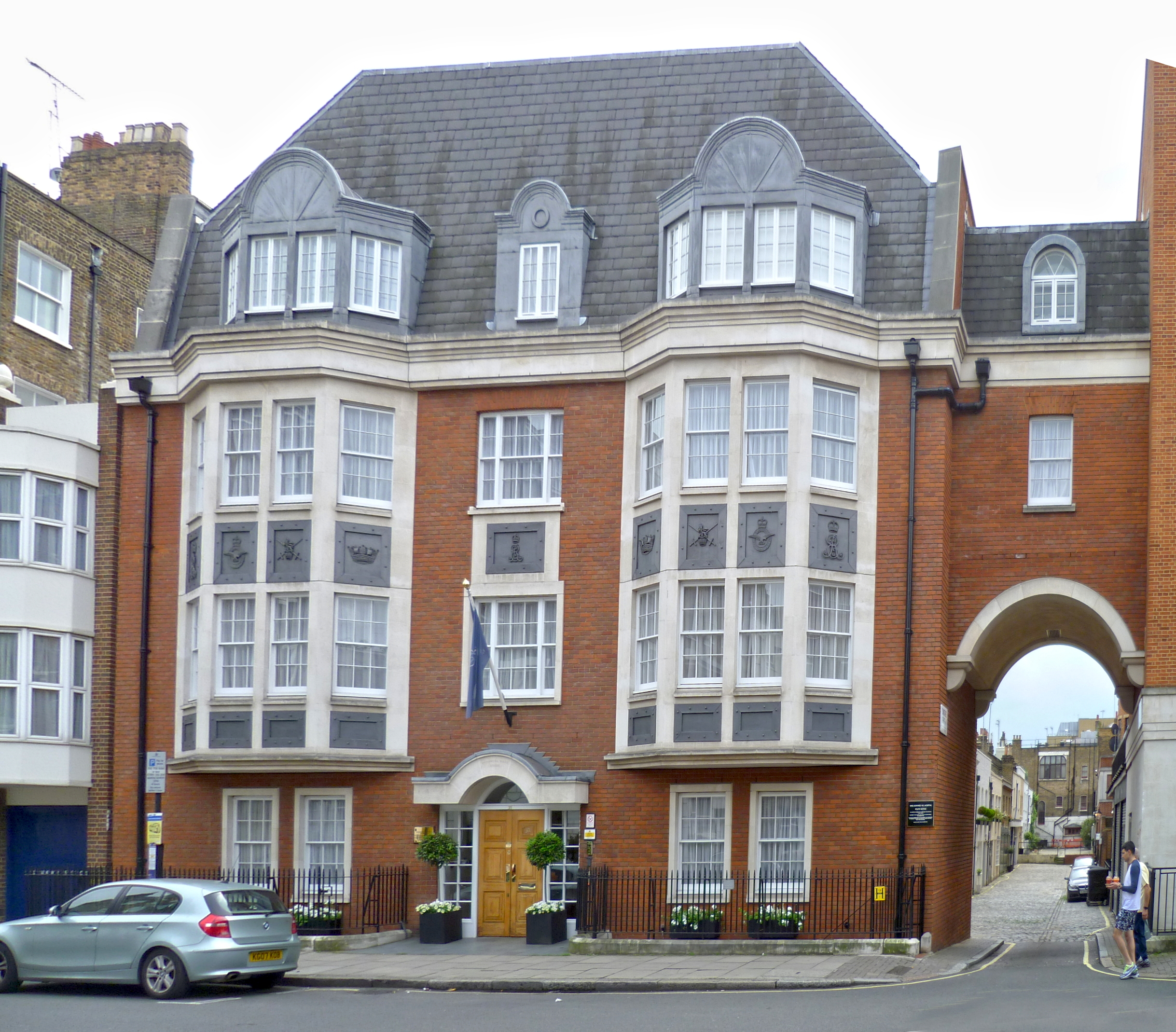
- Hospital buildings in Beaumont Street (top) and Devonshire Street (below)

Geography
- Location: London

Organisation
- Patron: Queen Elizabeth II

History
- Founded: 1899

Links
- Website: Official website

The King Edward VII's Hospital for Officers (KEVII) was established first as Sister Agnes' hospital in 1899 by Sister Agnes, and was then formally opened as King Edward VII's Hospital for Officers in 1904 by King Edward VII, who selected and appointed the first honorary medical staff. In 1914, Sister Agnes compiled a list of 23 honorary physicians and surgeons just a few days before the First World War. Although open to all London consultants, at that time, the status of the medical staff on the list was considered such that patients rarely requested the service from any other London physician or surgeon. The list was abandoned in 1919 and reinstated when the new hospital opened in Beaumont Street in 1948.

Closely associated with the Royal Family, the hospital was noted around the time of its centenary, to have in its list of physicians and surgeons around 100 staff, which required the inclusion of the Royal Medical Household. In 2018 there were 300 physicians and surgeons at the hospital working under a "practising privileges agreement", granted after the consultant selection and review committee (CSRC) approve and invite a consultant.

== 1904 list ==
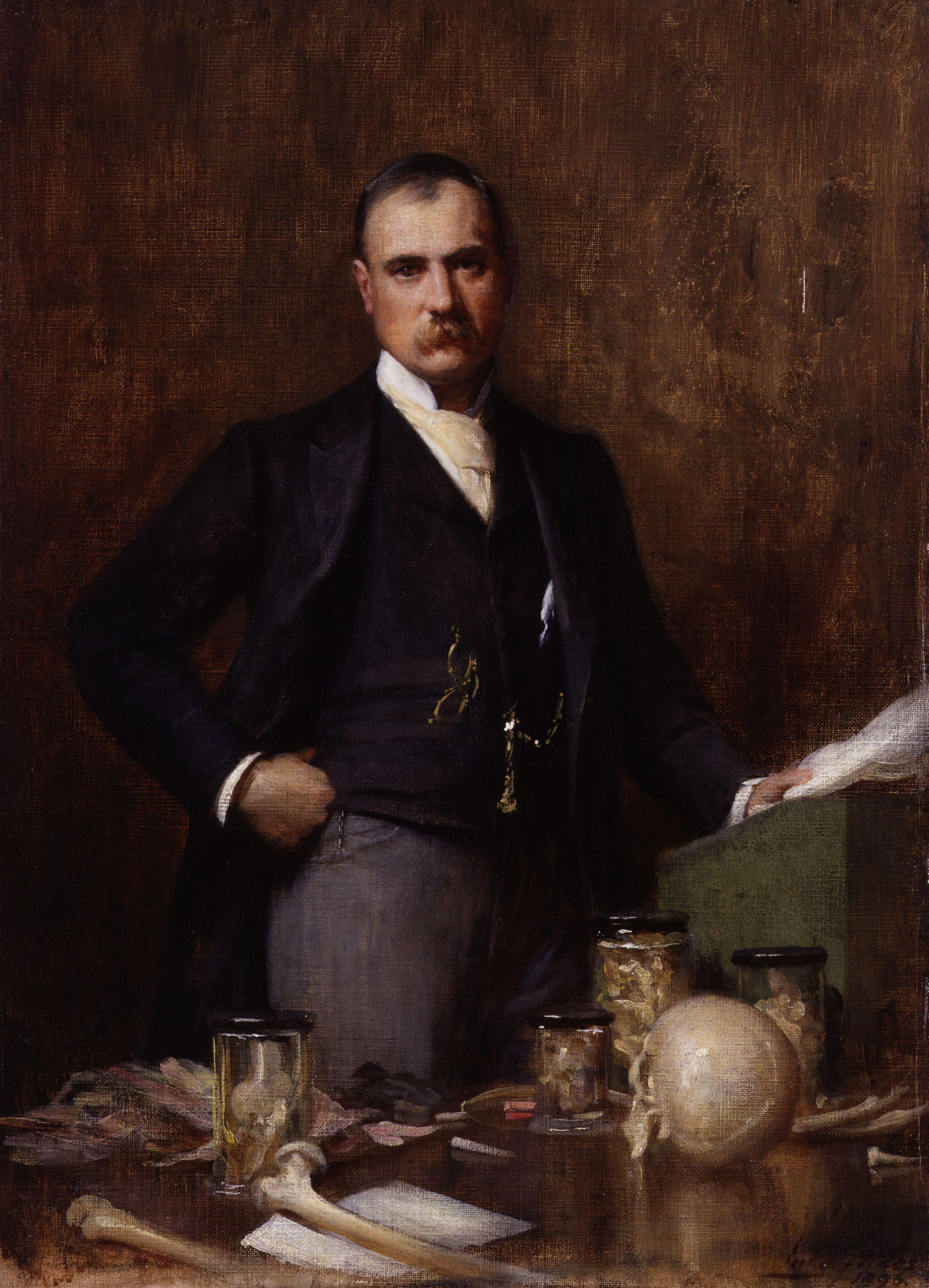
Sir Frederick Treves, Bt by Sir Samuel Luke Fildes

The King Edward VII's Hospital was established first as Sister Agnes' hospital in 1899 by Sister Agnes, and then formally opened as King Edward VII's Hospital for Officers in 1904 by King Edward VII. The hospital's honorary medical staff were first selected and appointed by the King. On 6 July 1904 Buckingham palace released a list of the honorary medical staff, headed by Sir Frederick Treves, who is credited with saving the King's life by performing an operation on his appendix, and Sir Thomas Smith who was present at that operation. Both were Serjeant Surgeons to the King.

Name	birth/death	Comments	Image	Ref
Herbert William Allingham	1862 – 1904	In 1903 whilst operating he contracted syphilis. The following year, his wife died and in the same year he was appointed to KEVII. Depressed, he travelled to Egypt and died in Marseille on 4 November 1904, from an overdose of morphine at the age of 42.		
Sir Thomas Barlow, 1st Baronet	1845 – 1945	Barlow's disease (infantile scurvy) is named for him.	Sir Thomas Barlow2	
Sir William H. Bennett	1852 – 1931	Surgeon at St George's Hospital. Treated sick and wounded soldiers on their return from the Boer war.		
Tom Bird	?–1932	Consulting Anæsthetist, Guy's Hospital and East London Hospital for Children.		
Sir Anthony Bowlby	1855 – 1929	Appointed Surgeon to the Household of King Edward VII in 1904.	Anthony Alfred Bowlby	
Sir William Broadbent	1835 – 1907	Broadbent was physician-extraordinary to Queen Victoria and physician-in-ordinary to King Edward VII and the Prince of Wales.	William Broadbent	
Arthur H. Cheatle	1866 – 1929	House surgeon to Joseph Lister before specialising in aural surgery.	Arthur Henry Cheatle. Photograph by the London Stereoscopic Wellcome V0026146	
Sir G. Lenthal Cheatle	1865 – 1951	Co-authored Tumours of the breast (1931).		
Sir Anderson Critchett	1845 – 1925	Eye surgeon to King Edward VII.		
Sir Alexander Crombie	1845 – 1906	Scottish surgeon who joined the Indian Medical Service and became resident surgeon at the Calcutta Medical College, where he became professor of materia medica. In 1877, he served the civil surgeoncy of Dacca, and was later joint civil surgeon of Simla. He later became joint member of the Medical Board at the India Office.		
David Ferrier	1843 – 1928	Scottish neurologist and psychologist.		
Sir Peter Freyer	1851 – 1921	Irish surgeon who performed genitourinary surgery, best known at first as an Indian Medical Service (IMS) officer, for making popular the procedure for crushing bladder stones to allow them to be evacuated through the natural passages. Following retirement from the IMS after 20 years of service in India, he returned to England and popularized a procedure for benign large prostates.	Peter Freyer	
Sir Alfred Downing Fripp	1865 – 1930	In 1901 he was elected a Knight of Grace of the Order of St John of Jerusalem, created CB for his services in the Boer War, and made CVO. He was knighted in 1903, and was appointed KCVO in 1906. He was surgeon-in-ordinary to the Prince of Wales, and to the next Prince of Wales, afterwards King George V.		
Rickman Godlee	1849 – 1925	Surgeon	Portrait of Sir Rickman John Godlee	
James Frederick Goodhart	1845–1916			
Frederick William Hewitt	1857 – 1916	The King's anaesthetist.		
Victor A. H. Horsley	1857 – 1916	Known for the Horsley–Clarke apparatus (developed together with Robert H. Clarke in 1908).	Victor Horsley3	
George Henry Makins	1853 – 1933	Surgeon	George Henry Makins2	
John Lockhart-Mummery	1875 – 1957	Surgeon at St Mark's Hospital, London, who devised a classification of rectal cancer and described familial polyposis which led to the formation of the polyposis registry. He authored Diseases of the Rectum and Colon and their Surgical Treatment (1923) and The Origin of Cancer (1934). His work on colorectal surgery earned him the nickname "King Rectum".	John Percy Lockhart-Mummery portrait	
Frederick W. Pavy	1829 – 1911			
Richard D. Powell				
William Aldren Turner	1864–1945			
Henry Roe Walker		M.R.C.S., L.R.C.P		
Sir William Hale-White	1857 – 1949	Physician at Guy's Hospital, colonel in the RAMC during the First World War, and knighted in 1919.	William Hale-White	

== 1905 list ==
Additions were made in 1905.

Name	birth/death	Comments	Image	Ref
Sir Watson Cheyne	1852 – 1932		Watson Cheyne2	
Sir Alfred Pearce Gould	1852 – 1922		Alfred Pearce Gould	
Sir Bruce Porter	1869 – 1948		H. E. B. Bruce-Porter	

== 1906 list ==
Additions were made in 1906.

Name	birth/death	Comments	Image	Ref
John Anderson				
Sir Charles A. Balance	1856 – 1936		Charles Alfred Ballance	
Sir Malcolm Morris	1849 – 1924			
T. H. Openshaw	1856 – 1929			
Sir Charters J. Seymonds				
Herbert Tiley				
Cuthebert S. Wallace	1867 – 1944			

== 1914 list ==
A few days before the onset of the First World War, during which the hospital was located at 9 Grosvenor Gardens, Sister Agnes compiled a list of 23 honorary physicians and surgeons. Although patients could "if desired be treated by any member of the surgical staff of a London hospital", at that time, the status of the medical staff was considered such that patients rarely requested the service from any other London consultant. Throughout the war, all worked at the hospital without a fee. According to historian Richard Hough "to work for the sovereign and Sister Agnes was sufficient, indeed a privilege". Arthur H. Cheatle, G. Lenthal Cheatle, John Lockhart-Mummery and Sir William Hale-White, from the 1904 list remained on the 1914 list.

Name	birth/death	Comments	Image	Ref
Sir Bertrand Dawson	1864 – 1945	Physician in ordinary to four successive monarchs. One time president of the Royal College of Physicians.	Bertrand Edward Dawson	
Sir William Bennett	1852 – 1931	Treated wounded soldiers returning from the Boer War, for which he was publicly thanked by Lord Roberts. During the First World War he served the British Red Cross and the Order of St John.		
Sir William Arbuthnot Lane	1856 – 1943	Surgeon at Guy's Hospital and examiner at the Royal College of Surgeons. During the First World War, he served in the Aldershot command and was gazetted colonel, AMS, in 1917. He organized the Queen's Hospital at Sidcup for the treatment of facial injuries and worked with Sir Harold Gillies and Henry Tonks.	Sir william arbuthnot-lane, 1st bt	
Herbert J. Paterson	1867 – 1940	Honorary surgeon in charge of Queen Alexandra's Hospital for Officers, before becoming surgeon to King Edward VII Hospital for Officers.		
James Sherren	1872 – 1945	He followed Sir Frederick Treves before becoming a surgeon of the abdomen, working with Joseph Blomfield. Named for the Sherren's triangle.		
Sir T. Crisp English	1878 – 1949	Surgeon to St George's Hospital, specialised in head injuries.		
Charles Arthur Morris	1860 – 1942	Friend of Sister Agnes, he served the hospital during the Boer War and the First World War. A surgeon, he had a general practice in London.		
Harold Spitta	1877 – 1954	Bacteriologist to Royal medical household.		
Joseph Blomfield	1870 – 1948	Anaesthetist who worked closely with James Sherren.		
E. W. Clapham		Anaesthetist		
Richard R. Cruise	1877 – 1946	Ophthalmic surgeon at the Royal Westminster Ophthalmic Hospital who was appointed to the King Edward VII's Hospital in 1914. Invented chain curtain for helmets to reduce eye-injuries.		
W. H. Clayton-Greene	1874 – 1926	Dean of St Mary's Medical School from 1907 to 1910, full Surgeon and Lecturer on Surgery in 1911, Consulting Surgeon in 1924, and Surgeon to the French Hospital, to the Hampstead General Hospital, and to the Radium Institute. He was an examiner in anatomy.		
Sir Francis Mark Farmer	1866 – 1922	Dental surgeon		
Farquhar Buzzard	1871 – 1945	Contributed to neurology as did his father Thomas Buzzard.		
Thomas Walker				
Llewelyn Powell	Died 1934	Anaesthetist at the National Hospital for Paralysis and Epilepsy.		
Arnold Lawson	1867 – 1947	Broderip scholar and later an Ophthalmologist.		
John Thomas-Walker				

== 1948 at Beaumont Street ==
In 1919, when the hospital returned to 17 Grosvenor Crescent, having been at Grosvenor Gardens throughout the war, the consultant list was abandoned. However, once located at the purpose-developed Beaumont Street in 1948, the King's Fund advised that one was necessary, and with modest charges, the consultants would acquire the prestige of being on the list. 27 physicians and surgeons were subsequently invited by the medical members of the hospital's council.

Name	birth/death	Comments	Image	Ref
Sir Clement Price-Thomas	1893 – 1973	Welsh thoracic surgeon known for his 1951 operation on King George VI.		
Sir Henry Osmond-Clarke	1905 – 1986	Appointed consultant orthopaedic surgeon to the London Hospital in 1946, before being appointed to King Edward VII Hospital for Officers.		
Cecil Fleming				
Ronald Furlong	1909 – 2002			
Sir Cecil Wakeley	1892 – 1979	President of the Royal College of Surgeons from 1949 to 1954.		
Sir Brian Warren	1914 – 1996	Physician to Sir Edward Heath.		

== 1950s -1960s ==
In 1954 there were 28 physicians and surgeons on the list of medical staff. From January 1965, the use of the hospital was restricted to those consultants from the recognised list. In 1969, upon the retirement of Matron Alice Saxby, eight new appointments were made.

Name	birth/death	Comments	Image	Ref
Sir Archibald McIndoe	1900 – 1960		McIndoe monument	
Sir Anthony Michael Dawson	1928 – 1997	Physician at St Bartholomew's Hospital who became physician to the Queen from 1982.		
Hugh Evelyn Lockhart-Mummery	1918 – 1988	Son of John Lockhart-Mummery. Appointed Surgeon to the Royal Household in 1969 and later Surgeon to The Queen and then Serjeant-Surgeon.		
Sir Edward Muir	1906 – 1973	Broderic scholar, pathologist and colorectal surgeon. He was appointed surgeon to the Royal Household in 1954, and surgeon to the Queen in 1964. Shortly before his death he became Sergeant Surgeon.		
John Creyghton Ainsworth-Davis	1895 – 1976		Butler, Ainsworth-Davis, Lindsay, Griffiths 1920	

== Later years ==
By the early 1990s, the hospital had increased bed capacity to 62 and its medical and surgical staff numbered 87.

Name	birth/death	Comments	Image	Ref
John Scadding		Neurologist		
Michael Shipley		Rheumatologist		
Harvey White	Born 1936	Prior to holding an appointment at the King Edward VII Hospital for Officers, he was consultant surgeon at The Royal Marsden Hospital from 1976.	Harvey White at the Medical Society of London	
Reginald Wyndham Lloyd-Davies	1934 – 2023	Urologist		
Marcus Setchell	Born 1943			
Richard Thompson	Born 1940		Sir Richard Thompson	
Roger Vickers	Born 1945	Operated at King Edward VII's Hospital from 1992 to 2011.		
Ratcliffe Martin Bowen Wright				
Sir Allen Goldsmith		Broderip scholar		
Edward Lawson McDonald				
Kenneth Henry Stokes				
Robert Maxwell Chance				
Sir Kenneth Robson	1909 – 1978	Graduated from Middlesex Hospital, where he was a Broderip scholar, and where he later worked. He specialized in thoracic medicine at the Brompton Hospital and at St George's Hospital.		
Horace Evans, 1st Baron Evans	1903 – 1963			
Sarah Muirhead-Allwood	Born 1947	Orthopaedic surgeon		
Helen Parkhouse	1956 – 2010	Urologist at St Thomas' Hospital, trained under Wyndham Lloyd-Davies and Richard Turner-Warwick. Her work involved research on bladder dysfunction in Parkinson's disease. At the KEVII, she dealt with female urology.		
Richard Turner-Warwick	1925 – 2020	Urologist on the staff of the Middlesex Hospital and St Peter's Hospital. Introduced video-cysto-urethrography. Recipient of the St Peter's Medal.		

== 21st Century ==
The historian Richard Hough, in his book Sister Agnes (1998) described the hospital near the turn of the 21st century as "effectively the Royal Family's hospital" and as result "requires the Household's medical staff to be on the list. The list of consultants totalled near 100 at the hospital's centenary. In 2018 there were 300 physicians and surgeons at the hospital working under a "practising privileges agreement", granted after the consultant selection and review committee (CSRC) approve and invite a consultant.

Name	birth/death	Comments	Image	Ref
Justin Cobb		Consultant orthopaedic surgeon at the Middlesex Hospital before Imperial. Orthopedic surgeon to the Queen and advisor to the RAF.		
John Cunningham		Professor of nephrology.		
Alan Farthing	Born 1963	Surgeon Gynaecologist to the Royal Household in 2008 and to the Queen in 2013.		
The Lord Kakkar	Born 1964		Official portrait of Lord Kakkar crop 2	
Roger Kirby	Born 1950		Roger Kirby	
Charles Knight		Cardiologist and chief executive of St Bartholomew's Hospital		
Caroline Moore		The first woman to be made a professor of urology in the United Kingdom.		
Dame Lesley Regan	Born 1956	Professor of gynaecology at Imperial College. Between 2016 and 2019 she served as the president of the Royal College of Obstetricians and Gynaecologists.		
Huw Thomas				
George Fieldman	Born 1955	Consultant Chartered Psychologist, Cognitive Behavioral Psychotherapist, Executive Coach and Mentor, with a research background in biological psychology and occupational health psychology. Father of British Olympic coxswain, Henry Fieldman.		,

== Bibliography ==
- Hough, Richard (1998). Sister Agnes: The History of King Edward VII's Hospital for Officers 1899-1999. London: John Murray. ISBN 0-7195-5561-2
- Raymond Lamont Brown (2011). Royal Poxes & Potions: Royal Doctors & Their Secrets. History Press. ISBN 978-0-7524-7390-1.
