= Ekauna =

Village in the Bhojpur district of Bihar, India

Ekauna, historically documented as Ekhowna, is a village in the Bhojpur district of Bihar, India. It is situated near the city of Arrah.

== History ==
One of the earliest mentions of the village is found on 28 July 1873, by J. H. Thornton, who was the Civil Surgeon of the Shahabad district. The report talks about the cholera outbreak that affected numerous towns and villages in the district.

According to the report, the epidemic reached Ekauna around the middle of June 1873, concurrently with an outbreak in the nearby village of Alekhi Tola. The outbreak was severe, with ten recorded cases of cholera, resulting in seven deaths.

== Geography ==
Ekauna is situated in the alluvial plains of the Ganges. The village is located in the Udwantnagar block of the Bhojpur district.
