= Richard Turner-Warwick =

British urologist (1925–2020)

Richard Turner-Warwick CBE FRCP FRCS FRCOG FACS
- Turner-Warwick in 1946
- Born: Richard Trevor Turner-Warwick; 21 February 1925
- Died: 19 September 2020 (aged 95)
- Education: Bedales School; Oriel College, Oxford
- Occupation: Surgeon
- Known for: Reconstructive urology Video-cysto-urethrography
- Spouse: Dame Margaret Turner-Warwick
- Medical career
- Profession: Urologist
- Institutions: Middlesex Hospital; King Edward VII's Hospital
- Awards: Broderip scholar St Peter's Medal
- Website: Official website

Richard Trevor Turner-Warwick CBE FRCP FRCS FRCOG FACS (21 February 1925 – 19 September 2020) was a British urologist who was internationally known for his work on the surgical restoration of the structure and function of the genitourinary tract. He introduced video-cysto-urethrography.

After studying medicine at Oriel College, Oxford, where Turner-Warwick was president of its boat club during the year that it won The Boat Race, he completed his pre-clinical training at the Middlesex Hospital. During the 1950s he rotated through several medical and surgical specialties including urology with Sir Eric Riches and Sir David Innes Williams at the Institute of Urology in London. In 1958 he won the Leopold Hudson Travelling Fellowship that enabled him to be appointed to a research position at Colombia Presbyterian Delafield Hospital. Subsequently, he became one of six consultant general surgeons to the Middlesex Hospital, where he also looked after the thyroid clinic and developed his trephine biopsy instrument. In 1963, he took over the hospital's urological department, succeeding Sir Eric.

In 1977 Turner-Warwick was elected to be the Hunterian Professor of the Royal College of Surgeons.

== Early life and education ==
Richard Trevor Turner-Warwick was born on 21 February 1925, to William, a consultant surgeon at the Middlesex Hospital who specialised in colonic surgery and in varicose veins, and Joan (née Harris), a doctor and member of the Royal College of Physicians who specialised in women and children's welfare clinics in London's East End. His grandfather was a dentist.

After deciding from an early age that he wished to be a physician, he attended Bedales School in Petersfield, before matriculating to read medicine at Oriel College, Oxford in 1942. At Oxford he completed an honours degree in natural science. In the third year, he was offered an additional year of education by the anatomist surgeon, primatologist and palaeoanthropologist Wilfrid Le Gros Clark, who held the chair of the Anatomy Department. Thus he spent a fourth year at Oxford as an anatomy demonstrator, working on nerves relating to smell in rabbits and writing an MSc thesis.

While at Oxford, he became a skilled rower. In his third year he became captain of the Oxford University Boat Club and was elected its president in 1946, the same year they won The Boat Race, the first after the war.

== Career ==
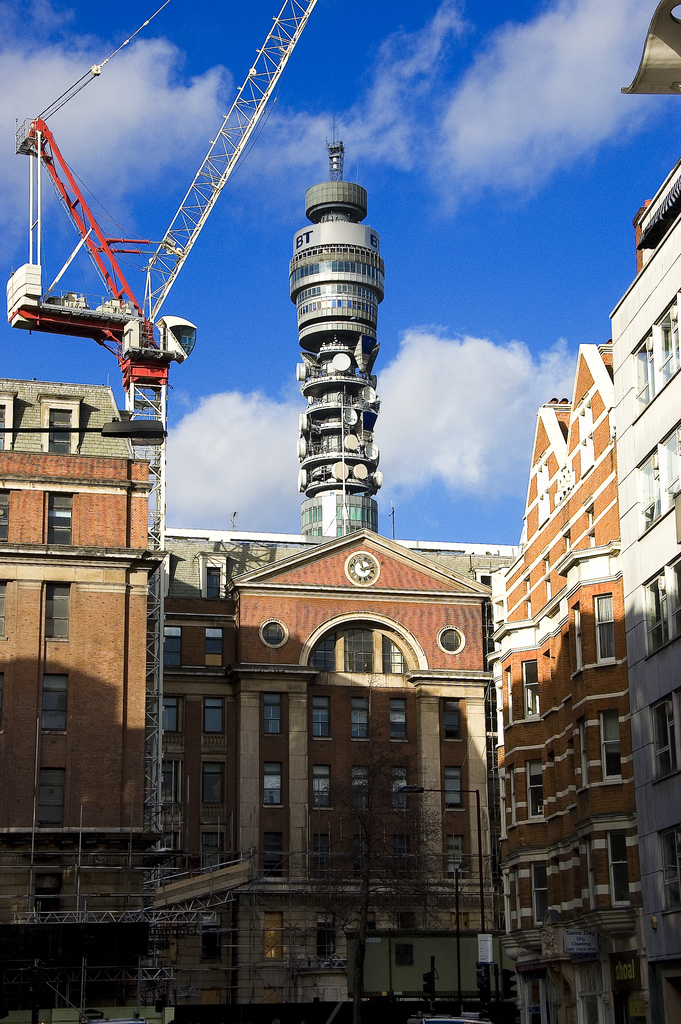
Middlesex Hospital

Turner-Warwick completed his pre-clinical training at the Middlesex Hospital, where he was a Broderip scholar. In 1954 he gained a Fellowship of the Royal Colleges of Surgeons and the following year obtained his MRCP, his Oxford Doctorate of Medicine a further two years later, and his Oxford Mastership of Surgery in 1962. In 1958 he won the Leopold Hudson Travelling Fellowship that enabled him to be appointed to a research position at Colombia Presbyterian Delafield Hospital.

By 1960 he had rotated through the specialties of internal medicine, pathology, gastroenterology, respiratory medicine, gynaecology and plastic surgery. In addition he trained in urology under Sir Eric Riches and Sir David Innes Williams at the Institute of Urology in London. Subsequently, he became one of six consultant general surgeons to the Middlesex Hospital, where he also looked after the thyroid clinic with Deborah Doniach and where he developed his trephine biopsy instrument. In 1963, he took over the hospital's urological department, succeeding Sir Eric.

He created a urodynamic unit and introduced video-cysto-urethrography in combination with measuring of pressure and flow voiding dynamics.

== Awards and honours ==
In 1977 Turner-Warwick was elected to be the Hunterian Professor of the Royal College of Surgeons. the following year he was a recipient of the St Peter's Medal awarded by the BAUS.

In 1987 he was awarded the Victor Bonney prize from the Royal College of Obstetricians and Gynaecologists. In 1991, he was awarded the Valentine Gold Medal of the New York Academy of Medicine. The Gordon Watson Medal was awarded the following year, from the RCS. In 2002 he received the William Didusch award that is awarded annually to recognise contributions to urological art.

In 2005 he was awarded the EAU Willy Gregoir Medal. In 2017 he received the EAU Innovators in Urology Medal. He was listed honorary medical staff at King Edward VII's Hospital for Officers.

== Personal and family ==
It was at Oxford in 1943 that Turner-Warwick met his future wife, Margaret Turner-Warwick, (later Dame), who was a medical student at Lady Margaret Hall. They were married at St Dunstan-in-the-West in 1950, the same year they both qualified. Dame Margaret Turner-Warwick would eventually become an internationally recognised thoracic physician. They had two daughters, Lynne who became a professor of medicine and Gillian who became an artist and teacher.

== Death ==
Turner-Warwick died on 19 September 2020 at the age of 95. He was predeceased by his wife Margaret, who died on 21 August 2017.

== Selected publications ==
=== Articles ===
- Turner-warwick, Richard (September 1968). "The Repair Of Urethral Strictures in the Region of the Membranous Urethra". Journal of Urology. 100 (3): 303–314. doi:10.1016/S0022-5347(17)62525-4. PMID 5677050.
- Warwick, Richard Turner; Whiteside, C. G.; Arnold, E. P.; Bates, C. P.; Worth, P. H. L.; Milroy, E. G. J.; Webster, J. R.; Wwir, J. (December 1973). "A Urodynamic View of Prostatic Obstruction and the Results of Prostatectomy". British Journal of Urology. 45 (6): 631–645. doi:10.1111/j.1464-410X.1973.tb12234.x. PMID 4130099.
- Farrar, D. J.; Osborne, J. L.; Stephenson, T. P.; Whiteside, C. G.; Weir, J.; Berry, J.; Milroy, E. J. G.; Warwick, Richard Turner (December 1975). "A Urodynamic View of Bladder Outflow Obstruction in the Female: Factors influencing the Results of Treatment". British Journal of Urology. 47 (7): 815–822. doi:10.1111/j.1464-410X.1975.tb04062.x. PMID 1241332.
- Turner-warwick, Richard (September 1976). "The Use of the Omental Pedicle Graft in Urinary Tract Reconstruction". Journal of Urology. 116 (3): 341–347. doi:10.1016/S0022-5347(17)58809-6. PMID 785032.
- Turner-Warwick, Richard (October 1977). "Complex Traumatic Posterior Urethral Strictures". Journal of Urology. 118 (4): 564–574. doi:10.1016/S0022-5347(17)58109-4. PMID 916051.

=== Books ===
- Turner-Warwick, Richard; Chapple, Christopher R (2002). Functional reconstruction of the urinary-tract and gynaeco-urology : an exposition of functional principles and surgical procedures. Oxford: Blackwell Science. ISBN 9780865426955. OCLC 845465522. This book is available for free online per Mr. Richard Turner-Warwicks request at rturnerwarwick.com
