= Edward McDonald =

Edward (also, Ed, Ned, or Ted) McDonald may refer to:

- Edward A. McDonald (born 1947), American attorney and actor
- Edward F. McDonald (1844–1892), American politician
- Edward Lawson McDonald (1918–2007), Irish cardiologist
- Edward Nathaniel McDonald (1832–1899), American businessman
- Edward R. McDonald (1872–1952), Canadian adventurer, lawyer, politician, writer and inventor
- Ed McDonald (Ontario politician), Communist Party candidate in the 1985 Ontario provincial election
- Ed McDonald (baseball) (1886–1946), Major League Baseball third baseman
- Ned McDonald (1910–1977), American football coach
- Ted McDonald (1891–1937), Australian cricketer
- Ted McDonald (footballer) (1876–1938), English footballer

== See also ==
- Edwin McDonald (1875–1919), Australian footballer
- Edward MacDonald (fl. 2000s–2020s), Chair of the Faculty of Arts at the University of Prince Edward Island
