= List of Broderip scholars =

The Broderip scholarship of the Middlesex Hospital is named for Francis Broderip, a large benefactor to the hospital in 1871.

Recipients of the scholarship include:

- William Freer Lucas
- Kenneth Lawson
- Moran Campbell
- Thomas Lionel Hardy
- Sir Edward Muir
- Eric Lush Pearce Gould
- Arnold Lawson
- Donald Acheson
- Sir Kenneth Robson
- Richard Turner-Warwick
- Roger William Gilliatt
- Shikandhini Kanagasundrem
