= Gilliatt =

Gilliatt is a surname. Notable people with the surname include:

- Penelope Gilliatt (1932–1993), English novelist, short story writer, screenwriter, and film critic
- Roger William Gilliatt (1922–1991), British professor of neurology
- William Gilliatt (1884–1956), British gynecologist

== See also ==
- Gilliat, a surname
