= Sarah Muirhead-Allwood =

British orthopaedic surgeon

- Born: 1947 (age 78–79)
- Education: St Thomas' Hospital
- Occupation: Surgeon
- Known for: Hip surgery
- Medical career
- Profession: Orthopaedic surgeon
- Institutions: Whittington Hospital; Royal Northern Hospital; Royal National Orthopaedic Hospital; King Edward VII Hospital for Officers; Princess Grace Hospital

Sarah Muirhead-Allwood (FRCS) (born 1947), is a British orthopaedic surgeon known for performing complex hip resurfacings and unusual hip replacements. Those she has operated on include The Queen Mother and Andy Murray.

In 2002 she founded the London Hip Unit, to provide adults with hip problems a range of supportive services.

== Early life and education ==
Sarah Muirhead-Allwood, was born William Muirhead-Allwood, in 1947. She attended Wellington College, Berkshire, and gained her medical degree from St Thomas's Hospital Medical School, in 1971.

== Career ==
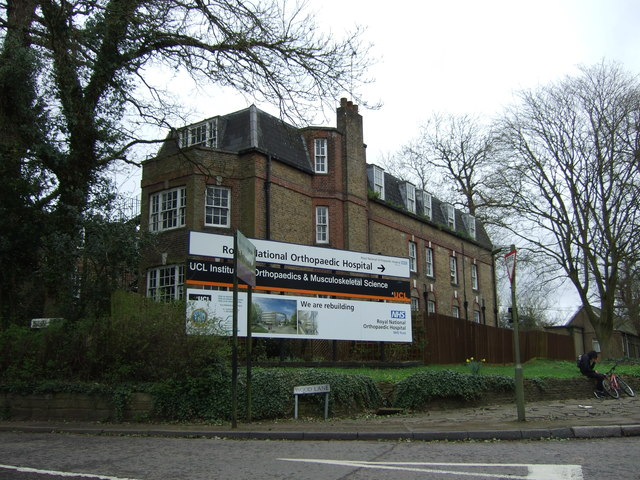
Royal National Orthopaedic Hospital, Stanmore

Following a house job with Ronald Furlong, who influenced her choice of hip surgery, she gained experience in cardiac surgery and worked with the orthopaedic surgeons Lorden Trickey and Tony Caterall at the Royal National Orthopaedic Hospital (RNOH). Subsequently, she was appointed consultant orthopaedic surgeon at the Whittington Hospital, London and the Royal Northern Hospital in 1984, and at the RNOH in 1991.

Muirhead-Allwood has been operating on hips for over 25 years, with a focus on replacements that are unusual and revisions that are complex. She later collaborated with Jonathan Jeffers and Imperial College's medical engineering department, to look at the function of the hip capsule.

=== Other roles ===
In 2002 she founded the London Hip Unit, to provide adults with hip problems a range of supportive services. She is a member of several hip societies including the International Hip Society.

=== Notable operations ===
At the King Edward VII Hospital for Officers (KEVII), she assisted Sir Roger Vickers in the hip replacement surgery on the Queen Mother in 1995. In 2019, at the Princess Grace Hospital, she operated on the tennis player Andy Murray, who subsequently continued playing successful tennis. Others operated on by Muir-Allwood include Eamonn Holmes and Charles Collingwood.

== Personal and family ==
In 1996, she publicly disclosed her gender reassignment plans to the tabloid press. The KEVII committee initially disallowed her admitting privileges, a decision that was reversed. In 2003 she appeared in a documentary. Muirhead-Allwood was previously married and she has two sons.

== Selected publications ==
- Lewis, Sl; Pozo, Jl; Muirhead-Allwood, Wf (1 January 1989). "Coronal fractures of the lateral femoral condyle". The Journal of Bone and Joint Surgery. British Volume. 71-B (1): 118–120. doi:10.1302/0301-620X.71B1.2914979. ISSN 0301-620X. PMID 2914979.
- Ferris, Bd; Kennedy, C; Bhamra, M; Muirhead-Allwood, W (1 May 1989). "Morphology of the femur in proximal femoral fractures". The Journal of Bone and Joint Surgery. British Volume. 71-B (3): 475–477. doi:10.1302/0301-620X.71B3.2722943. ISSN 0301-620X. PMID 2722943.
- Haddad, F. S.; Muirhead-Allwood, S. K.; Manktelow, A. R. J.; Bacarese-Hamilton, I. (1 July 2000). "Two-stage uncemented revision hip arthroplasty for infection". The Journal of Bone and Joint Surgery. British Volume. 82-B (5): 689–694. doi:10.1302/0301-620X.82B5.0820689. ISSN 0301-620X.
- Panagiotidou, Anna; Meswania, Jay; Hua, Jia; Muirhead‐Allwood, Sarah; Hart, Alister; Blunn, Gordon (2013). "Enhanced wear and corrosion in modular tapers in total hip replacement is associated with the contact area and surface topography". Journal of Orthopaedic Research. 31 (12): 2032–2039. doi:10.1002/jor.22461. ISSN 1554-527X. PMID 23966288. S2CID 22064001.
- Rivière, C.; Lazennec, J.-Y.; Van Der Straeten, C.; Auvinet, E.; Cobb, J.; Muirhead-Allwood, S. (1 June 2017). "The influence of spine-hip relations on total hip replacement: A systematic review". Orthopaedics & Traumatology: Surgery & Research. 103 (4): 559–568. doi:10.1016/j.otsr.2017.02.014. hdl:10044/1/49571. ISSN 1877-0568. PMID 28373138.
- Logishetty, Kartik; Muirhead-Allwood, Sarah K.; Cobb, Justin P. (31 January 2020). "Hip resurfacing – what is its role in modern orthopaedics?". Bone & Joint 360. 9 (1): 4–9. doi:10.1302/2048-0105.91.360742. ISSN 2048-0091. S2CID 213345462.

== See also ==
- List of honorary medical staff at King Edward VII's Hospital for Officers
