= Alexander Crombie (surgeon) =

Scottish surgeon (1845–1906)

Alexander Crombie CB
- Born: 2 December 1845; Crail, Fifeshire, Scotland
- Died: 29 September 1906 (aged 60); London, England
- Education: University of Edinburgh
- Occupation: Surgeon
- Medical career
- Institutions: Indian Medical Service; Calcutta Medical College; Middlesex Hospital; King Edward VII's Hospital for Officers
- Research: Tropical diseases

Alexander Crombie CB (2 December 1845 – 29 September 1906) was a Scottish surgeon who joined the Indian Medical Service and became resident surgeon at Calcutta Medical College, India, where he became professor of materia medica.

He served the civil surgeoncy of Dacca before becoming joint civil surgeon at Simla, and later joined the Medical Board at the India Office while simultaneously serving the Medical Board at the War Office. In Calcutta, he initiated the use of hypodermic morphine for an easier use of chloroform anaesthesia, the first documented account of premedication.

When he returned to England he was appointed lecturer in tropical diseases at the Middlesex Hospital and the London School of Tropical Medicine. In 1904 he was listed a member of the honorary medical staff to the King Edward VII's Hospital for Officers.

== Early life and education ==
Alexander Crombie was born on 2 December 1845 at Fifeshire, Scotland. He attended St. Andrews Public School, and subsequently studied medicine at the University of Edinburgh, where in 1867 he received the M.B. with honours (as well as a Licentiate of the Royal College of Surgeons of Edinburgh), and earned a doctorate in 1870. In March 1871, with admission into the Indian Medical Service (IMS) temporarily closed, he gained entry to the Army Medical Service (AMS) effective 1 April, coming first place in the AMS examinations. In December 1872, he resigned from the AMS at the reopening of the IMS, and once again came first place in the necessary examinations.

== Career ==
Crombie reached India in July 1872 and was appointed resident surgeon at the Calcutta Medical College (CMC) the following year. At the CMC he became professor of materia medica in 1874 and wrote for The Indian Medical Gazette. In February 1875, he was appointed junior civil surgeon at Rangoon, where he was also its port health officer, a position he held until April of 1877. Following this, he served the civil surgeoncy of Dacca and was put in charge of a mental asylum and the hospital for locals. In From April 1880 into 1881, he was joint civil surgeon at Simla, where he reported an outbreak of "Hill diarrhoea". He would return to his former post at Dacca thereafter, where he would remain until 1888, upon which time he was transferred to Calcutta.

As surgeon-superintendent at the Presidency General Hospital, Calcutta, he was the first to use morphine by syringe for the easier administration of chloroform anaesthesia, the first documented account of premedication. He became a fellow of Calcutta University, and a member and later president of the Calcutta Medical Society. His presidential address in 1894, at the Indian Medical Congress in Calcutta, focussed on the classification of fevers which he associated with particular Indian cities such as Calcutta fever and Bombay fever. He also described typhoid fever, non-malarial remittent fever and simple continued fever. He retired from the Indian Medical Service in 1898 as a brigade surgeon with the rank being equivalent to lieutenant colonel.

In 1900, two years after retiring, he joined the Medical Board at the India Office and during his three years with them also served the Medical Board at the War Office. When he returned to England, he was appointed lecturer of tropical diseases at the Middlesex Hospital and at the London School of Tropical Medicine.

== Awards and honours ==
Crombie was awarded associate membership of the Order of St. John of Jerusalem during his lifetime, and was also made Companion of the Bath (CB) (civil division) in 1902, receiving the award from the king at Buckingham Palace on 18 February 1903. In 1904, he was listed a member of the honorary medical staff to the King Edward VII's Hospital for Officers.

== Personal and family ==
Crombie married the daughter of William Bell, inspector-general of hospitals. They had one son and two daughters.

== Death ==
Crombie died on 29 September 1906 following a cancerous disease affecting his lumbar spine.

== Selected publications ==
- Crombie, A. (2 November 1874). "Lectures on the Vasculo-Cardiacs". The Indian Medical Gazette. 9 (11): 281–283. ISSN 0019-5863. PMC 5128246. PMID 28995080.
- Crombie, A. (1 August 1882). "Combined Use of Morphia and Chloroform". The Indian Medical Gazette. 17 (8): 223. ISSN 0019-5863. PMC 5152022. PMID 28998955.
- Crombie, A. (May 1892). "The Treatment of Hill Diarrhœa". The Indian Medical Gazette. 27 (5): 129–132. ISSN 0019-5863. PMC 5136780. PMID 28999901.
