= Caroline Moore =

Caroline or Carolyn Moore may refer to:

- Caroline Moore (academic), English urologist
- Caroline Moore (astronomer) (born 1994), American discoverer of Supernova 2008ha
- Carolyn Conn Moore (1904–1986), American politician
- Caroline Ellen Moore (1882–1956), Australian actress
