= Edward Muir =

Edward Muir may refer to:

- Edward Wallace Muir Jr., professor of history and Italian
- Edward Grainger Muir, British pathologist and colorectal surgeon
