= Broderip Ward =

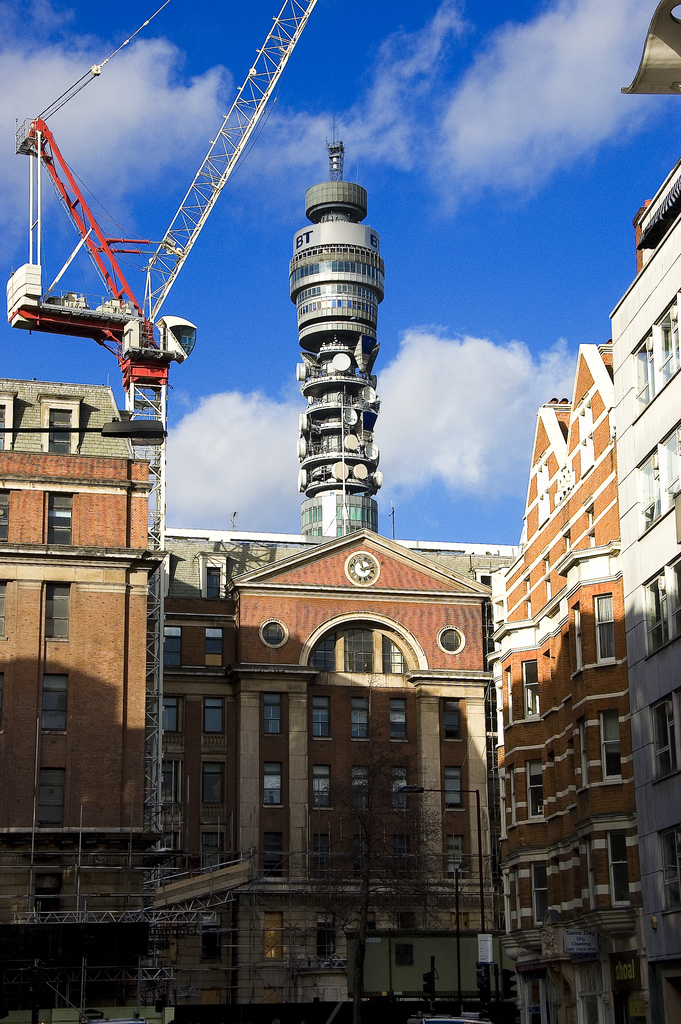
The Middlesex Hospital in 2007

The Broderip Ward was a ward at the Middlesex Hospital in Fitzrovia, London. It was the first ward dedicated to the care and treatment of people affected by HIV/AIDS in the United Kingdom.

== The old Broderip Ward ==
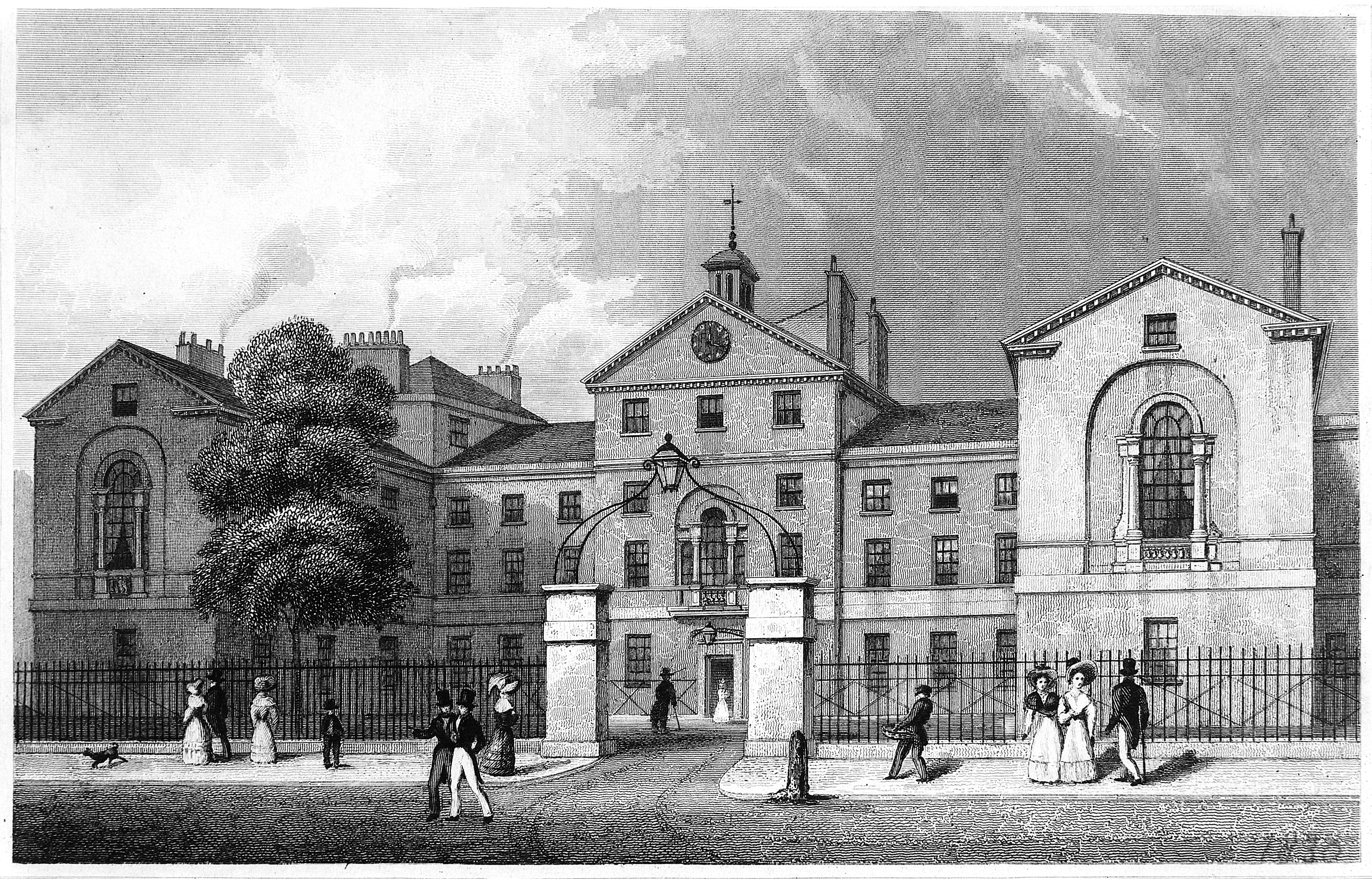
The Middlesex Hospital 19th century

Under the deanship of William Cayley, two Broderip scholarships were founded in 1872 by the Middlesex governors after the death of Francis Broderip, a large benefactor to the hospital. The Clayton Ward was also replaced by the Broderip Ward. When a move occurred to the west wing of the hospital, the name 'Broderip Ward' remained.

In the late nineteenth century, 25% of attendances to the Middlesex were due to trauma. Admissions to the Broderick Ward at the Middlesex hospital appeared in medical journals in 1874, when a 20-year-old presented with a bullet wound, in 1875 when a 52-year old grocer fell and fractured his skull, and in 1879 when a 39-year old was treated for suspected rupture of bladder, all under the care of Sir Henry Morris. A four-year-old child who swallowed a pin was admitted to the ward in 1913.

A further small donation towards the beds on the ward was received in 1922.

== Broderip Ward 1987 ==
The Broderip Ward took its first patients in January 1987, and was officially opened by Diana, Princess of Wales, on 9 April 1987. None of the patients agreed to be photographed with Diana at the opening of the ward due to fears of being publicly identified. Diana notably shook the hand of patients without wearing gloves on the ward. Diana subsequently visited the ward with the First Lady of the United States, Barbara Bush, in July 1991.

The construction of the ward cost £350,000 (equivalent to £1,012,424 in 2025). It was created from a disused surgical ward at the hospital. The creation of the ward was part of a set of improvements to the hospital costing £1 million that had been planned since 1985. The Charles Bell ward also served HIV/AIDS patients at the Middlesex Hospital. The doctor in charge of the ward was Professor Michael Adler. The respiratory physician Steve Semple led a team of doctors at the Broderip Ward. Staff at the ward also collaborated with staff from James Pringle House, a dedicated London sexual health clinic. The first sister of the ward, Jacqui Elliott, oversaw a staff of 14 nurses at its opening; more than twice the number of expected applicants applied to work on the ward. In a January 1987 interview with Sally Brompton in The Times, Elliott said that in choosing nurses to work on the ward she "obviously [had] to look for people who want to do it for the right reasons. It's no good them having the attitude of 'Aids is the in-thing, I've never looked after an Aids patient before, so let's do it now'. I wanted people who are caring without being hysterical". Brompton, wrote of the "built-in despondency element of nursing no-hopers", with Elliott countering that though there was no cure for AIDS "...there may be tomorrow. I have implicit faith in my medical colleagues to come up with something in the near future. You just have to treat the symptoms as they come along, keep a positive attitude and provide the best, possible nursing care for the patients. And it isn't limited to giving out bedpans — you have to treat them as a whole, mentally and physically, as well as all the people around them — family, colleagues and friends". The majority of patients at the opening of the ward were gay men. Repeatedly returning patients would become familiar with each other giving the ward a sense of "camaraderie".

Patients on the ward participated in the early trials of zidovudine, and new antiretroviral medicines.

Peter Godfrey-Faussett worked on the ward as a newly qualified doctor. He subsequently served as a UNAIDS Senior Adviser on Science. In a 2019 interview, Godfrey-Faussett recalled that "...here on the Broderip Ward were people of my own age, reading the same books, going to the same operas and plays. It was often hard to remain clinically detached. I can remember so many of them so clearly. And so many of their loved ones and families". He described Elliott as a "wonderful woman [who] encouraged us all to break the mould and provide care in a very different way. Back then, hospitals were quite old fashioned and regimented". The ward represented a new collaborative approach to patient care in contrast to the hierarchical structures of the past. Patients were encouraged to wear their clothes and to leave and return to the ward as they wished. The ward used make-up artists to disguise the signs of Kaposi's sarcoma.

The ward also had a dedicated outpatient facility. In 1989, Dr Rhiannon Jones, who was 26 at the time, took on the role of psychologist for the outpatients of Broderip ward. This was the first time on the ward that someone has been specifically appointed to care for patient's mental health, and it was one of the first roles in mentally caring for people with AIDS ever created. Patients were offered psychological help to come to terms with their diagnosis and eventual passing. Many patients suffered from depression, and Dr Jones worked with them to cope with death. The Terrence Higgins Trust also helped to provide support work in offering counselling to patients in need.

"The Ward", an exhibition of photographs by Gideon Mendel that showed the lives of four young men on the Broderip and Charles Bell wards at the Middlesex Hospital in 1993, was shown at the hospital's former Fitzrovia Chapel in 2017. The exhibition coincided with World AIDS Day.

The site of the AIDS Memorial in London has been chosen for its proximity to the Middlesex Hospital and the Bloomsbury Clinic.
