= Dorothea Liebermann-Meffert =

German surgeon (1930–2020)

Dorothea Maria Irene Liebermann-Meffert (6 May 1930 – 3 September 2020) was a German surgeon and professor of surgery at the Technical University of Munich.

== Early life ==
Liebermann-Meffert was born on 6 May 1930 in Rastatt, Germany, to Karl Peter and Irene (née Wrede) Meffert. She received the degree of Doctor of Medicine at the University of Freiburg in 1958.

== Career ==
- 1958 Resident District Hospital, Bad Säckingen
- 1959 Pediatric Surgery, University Zürich
- 1960–1964 Diakonie Hospital, Freiburg
- 1965–1969 Senior resident, associate professor, Anatomy University Institute, Germany
- 1970–1987 Associate professor University Hospital general surgery, Basel
- 1987–2002 Professor surgery, Technical University of Munich
- 2003–2004 Professor clinical surgery, University of Southern California, Los Angeles
- 2004 Professor surgery, Technical University of Munich

Liebermann-Meffert became known for her 1999 biography with Hubert J. Stein of Rudolf Nissen, inventor of the Nissen fundoplication.

== Personal life ==
Liebermann-Meffert married Eduard Karl Heinz Liebermann. Together they have four children.

== Selected publications ==
- Rudolf Nissen and the World Revolution of Fundoplication. Johann Ambrosius Barth Verlag, Heidelberg, 1999. (With Hubert J. Stein)
- A Century of International Progress and Tradition in Surgery: An Illustrated History of the International Society of Surgery. Kaden Verlag, Heidelberg, 2001. (Jointly with Harvey White) ISBN 3-922777-42-2
