= Edward Grainger Muir =

British pathologist and surgeon (1906–1973)

Sir Edward Grainger Muir (18 February 1906 – 14 October 1973), was a British pathologist and colorectal surgeon. He was a recipient of the Broderip scholarship of the Middlesex Hospital and later held appointments at King's College Hospital, the Queen Victoria Hospital, and the King Edward VII's Hospital for Officers, where he was on the list of honorary medical staff. He was president of the Royal College of Surgeons, the Medical Society of London, the Harveian Society, and of the Proctological Section and Section of Surgery of the Royal Society of Medicine, London. Muir was appointed surgeon to the British Royal Household in 1954, and surgeon to the Queen in 1964. Shortly before his death he was made Serjeant Surgeon. He was knighted in 1970.

Muir–Torre syndrome, a rare hereditary, autosomal dominant cancer syndrome is named in part for Muir.
