= William H. Bennett (surgeon) =

British surgeon (1852–1931)

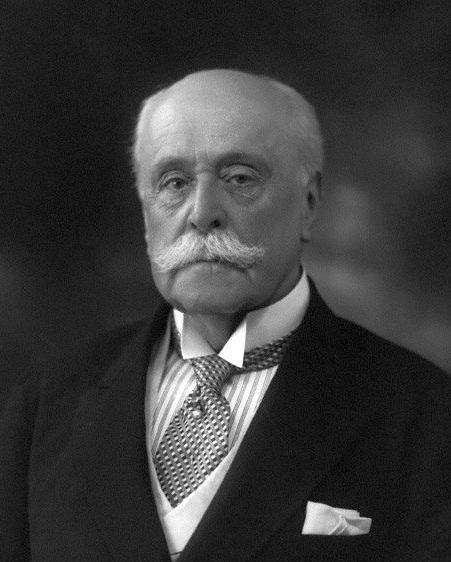
Sir William Henry Bennett in 1930

Sir William Henry Bennett, KCVO, FRCS (1852 – 24 December 1931) was a British surgeon.

Bennett was a Wiltshireman, the son of William Francis Bennett, of Chilmark.

He held several administrative posts in medical establishments, including at St George's Hospital, where he was a senior surgeon.

Bennett introduced London doctors to massage as a treatment modality for new fractures in 1898 and established a department of massage at St. George´s. However, his most important contribution to medical science was a paper in which he introduced the surgical procedure of posterior rhizotomy for the relief of spasmodic pain in a lower extremity.

He was knighted as a Knight Commander of the Royal Victorian Order (KCVO) in July 1901, for services rendered to sick and wounded returning from the Boer War, South Africa, 1900–02, for which he was publicly thanked by Lord Roberts.

The following year, on 8 May 1902, he was appointed a Knight of Grace of the Order of the Hospital of Saint John of Jerusalem in England (KStJ). In 1904, he was selected to be among the honorary medical staff at King Edward VII's Hospital for Officers.

During the War 1914–1919 he relinquished all private affairs to take up work with the British Red Cross and the Order of St John.

Bennett married first, in 1882, Isabel Dickinson (died 1911), daughter of Thomas Dickinson. After his first wife´s death he married, in 1914, Gladys Florence Stewart Hartigan, daughter of Rev. Allen S. Hartigan.

He died on 24 December 1931 aged 79 and is buried in Putney Vale Cemetery, south west London.

== Notes and references ==
- Bennett, William H. (1889), A case in which acute spasmodic pain in the left lower extremity was completely relieved by subdural division of the posterior roots of certain spinal nerves, all other treatment having proved useless; death from sudden collapse and cerebral hæmorrhage on the twelfth day after the operation at the commencement. Journal: Medical Chirurgical Transactions, vol. 72, pp. 329–48.
- Morton, Leslie T. (1970), A medical bibliography (Garrison and Morton). Philadelphia & Toronto: J. B. Lippincott Company, p. 559.
- Wilkins, Robert H. (1992), Neurosurgical Classics. New York: Thieme Medical Publishers, p. 129.
