= Margaret Turner-Warwick =

British medical doctor and thoracic specialist

Dame Margaret Turner-Warwick DBE FRCP FMedSci FRACP FACP
- Born: Margaret Elizabeth Harvey Moore; 19 November 1924; London, England
- Died: 21 August 2017 (aged 92); United Kingdom
- Education: Lady Margaret Hall, Oxford; University College Hospital
- Spouse: Richard Turner-Warwick (m. 1950)
- Children: 2
- Awards: Dame Commander of the Order of the British Empire
- Medical career
- Profession: Doctor
- Field: Pulmonology
- Institutions: University College Hospital; Royal Brompton Hospital; National Heart and Lung Institute; Royal Devon and Exeter Health Care NHS Trust

Dame Margaret Elizabeth Turner-Warwick (née Harvey Moore; 19 November 1924 – 21 August 2017) was a British medical doctor and thoracic specialist. She was the first woman president of the Royal College of Physicians (1989–1992) and, later, chairman of the Royal Devon and Exeter Health Care NHS Trust (1992–1995).

== Family ==
Margaret Harvey Moore was born on 19 November 1924. Her birth was registered in St George, Hanover Square, London. She was the daughter of William Harvey Moore, Q.C., and his wife, Maud Kirkdale Baden-Powell, who were married on 23 March 1920. Dame Margaret was the granddaughter of Sir George Baden-Powell and Frances Wilson.

She married urologist Richard Turner-Warwick in 1950. They had two daughters, Lynne and Gillian.

== Education ==
Turner-Warwick was educated at the City of London School for Girls and Walthamstow Hall, before attending The Maynard School in Exeter from the age of 12 to the age of 18. While at Maynard, she became friends with Audrey Jane Pinsent, who later also became a notable scientist, best-known as Jane Gibson. In a memoir written for The Maynard School, Turner-Warwick recalled how she and Jane volunteered to be "lab girls", setting up the chemistry apparatus before classes – a way to both learn chemistry and also avoid school prayers, until 'rumbled' by their teacher. Turner-Warwick finished her schooling at St Paul's Girls' School.

She gained admission to study medicine at Lady Margaret Hall, Oxford, matriculating in 1943. It was at Lady Margaret Hall the she met and became lifelong friend with fellow medical student Patience Moberly (then Patience Proby). She continued her medical studies at University College Hospital, the teaching hospital associated with University College London. In her last term before her final university exams, she was diagnosed with tuberculosis and spent many months recovering in a sanatorium in Switzerland. After qualifying, she practised medicine at University College London and Royal Brompton Hospital.

== Career ==
Turner-Warwick decided to specialise in thoracic medicine, a field undergoing significant change at the time. She helped increase these changes with her colleagues Jack Pepys and Deborah Doniach. They expanded the understanding and measuring of lung function to include the immunology of the lung, and particularly of the fibrosing lung diseases. She also focused on asthma. In her research, she discovered that rates of forceful exhalation required different treatments. Her most notable clinical trial was with inhaled corticosteroids, which have formed a mainstay of modern treatment.

She became a senior lecturer at the Institute of Diseases of the Chest. In 1972 she was appointed Professor of Thoracic Medicine at the Cardiothoracic Institute (University of London), later Emeritus on her retirement in 1987. She was also Dean from 1984 to 1987 at the Cardiothoracic Institute (now the National Heart and Lung Institute). She was a member of the Nuffield Council on Bioethics, 1991–2000. She was elected an Honorary Fellow of Lady Margaret Hall in 1989.

== Legacy ==
There is an Annual Margaret Turner-Warwick Respiratory Lecture, started in 2006, as a collaboration between the National Heart and Lung Institute and the Royal Brompton and Harefield NHS Foundation Trust.

On 16 April 2015, Turner-Warwick officially opened the Margaret Turner-Warwick Education Centre for the National Heart and Lung Institute at the Royal Brompton Campus.

In 2021, the Margaret Turner Warwick Centre for Fibrosing Lung Disease was established at Imperial College London, becoming the UK's only centre for fibrosing lung diseases with the goal of, "increasing fundamental knowledge of fibrosis biology to develop, evaluate and implement novel, safe, and effective treatments that will ultimately lead to a cure for pulmonary fibrosis."

== Positions ==
- Member of the Nuffield Council on Bioethics, 1991–2000
- Vice President of TB Alert in 1999
- Chairman of the Royal Devon and Exeter Health Care NHS Trust, 1992–95
- President of the Royal College of Physicians, 1989–92
- President of British Thoracic Society, 1982–83
- Chairman of the Asthma Research Council, 1982–87
- Consultant Physician, Brompton Hospital, from 1965
- Professor of Thoracic Medicine at the Cardiothoracic Institute of London University, 1972–87 (Dean 1984–87), then Emeritus Professor, Cardiothoracic Institute.

== Honours ==
- Honorary Fellow, Lady Margaret Hall, constituent college of Oxford University (1989)
- Dame Commander of the Order of the British Empire (DBE; 1991)
- Inaugural Fellow, Academy of Medical Sciences (FMedSci; 1998)
- Her portrait hangs in the Royal College of Physicians (as a President, and the first female president) of the RCP.
