= Roger William Gilliatt =

British professor of neurology

Roger William Gilliatt (30 July 1922 - 19 September 1991) was a British professor of neurology at the National Hospital, Queen Square, where he specialised in the peripheral nervous system. He was a recipient of the Broderic scholarship of the Middlesex Hospital. His father was Sir William Gilliatt, the Queen's gynaecologist. He was PhD supervisor for Shirley Wray, neuro-ophthalmologist and Professor at Harvard Medical School.

Professor Gilliatt was best man at the wedding of Princess Margaret and Antony Armstrong-Jones which took place on Friday, 6 May 1960 at Westminster Abbey in London.
