= Harvey White (surgeon) =

British surgeon and oncologist

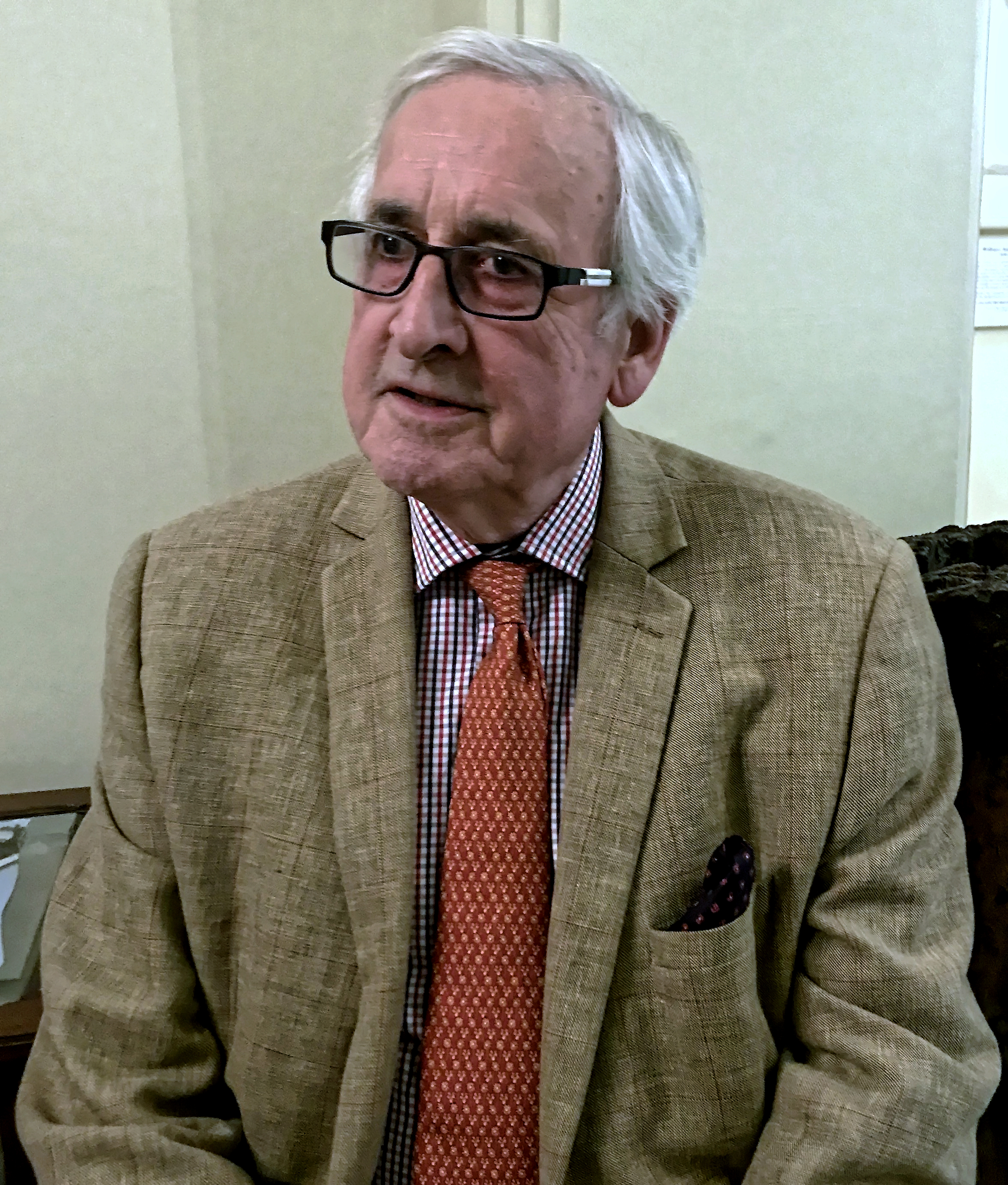
- Harvey White at the Medical Society of London (2018)
- Born: 1936 (age 89–90)
- Occupation: Surgeon
- Known for: Oncology; Past president Medical Society of London
- Website: Harvey White Website

Harvey White FRCS (born 1936) is a retired English surgeon and oncologist. He is a past president of the Medical Society of London and vice-president of the British Association of Surgical Oncology and the Royal Society of Medicine.

== Early life ==
Harvey White was born in 1936. He was educated at Winchester College between 1949 and 1954, and Magdalen College, Oxford. He trained in medicine at St Bartholomew's Hospital.

== Career ==
White was elected a fellow of the Royal College of Surgeons in 1970.

In 1976, he became consultant surgeon at the Royal Marsden Hospital, and later at King Edward VII Hospital for Officers, St Luke's Hospital for the Clergy and The London Clinic.

Between 1986 and 2003, he was chairman of the Brendoncare Foundation, following which he was appointed Chair of the Vice Patrons Committee.

He was president of the Osler Club of London 1986–87.

He is a past president of the Medical Society of London and vice-president of the British Association of Surgical Oncology and the Royal Society of Medicine. In 2012 he was the first recipient of the Royal Society of Medicine Medal.

== Retirement ==
He founded and chairs the Old Wykehamist Medical Society.

White was a co-founder of the Retired Fellows’ Society at the Royal Society of Medicine in London. In addition, he gathered some of its members, and others, to write a book on retirement planning.

After being at The London Clinic as consultant surgeon, for over fifteen years, he wrote a book about the Clinic entitled History of the London Clinic: A Celebration of 75 Years.

== Personal and family ==
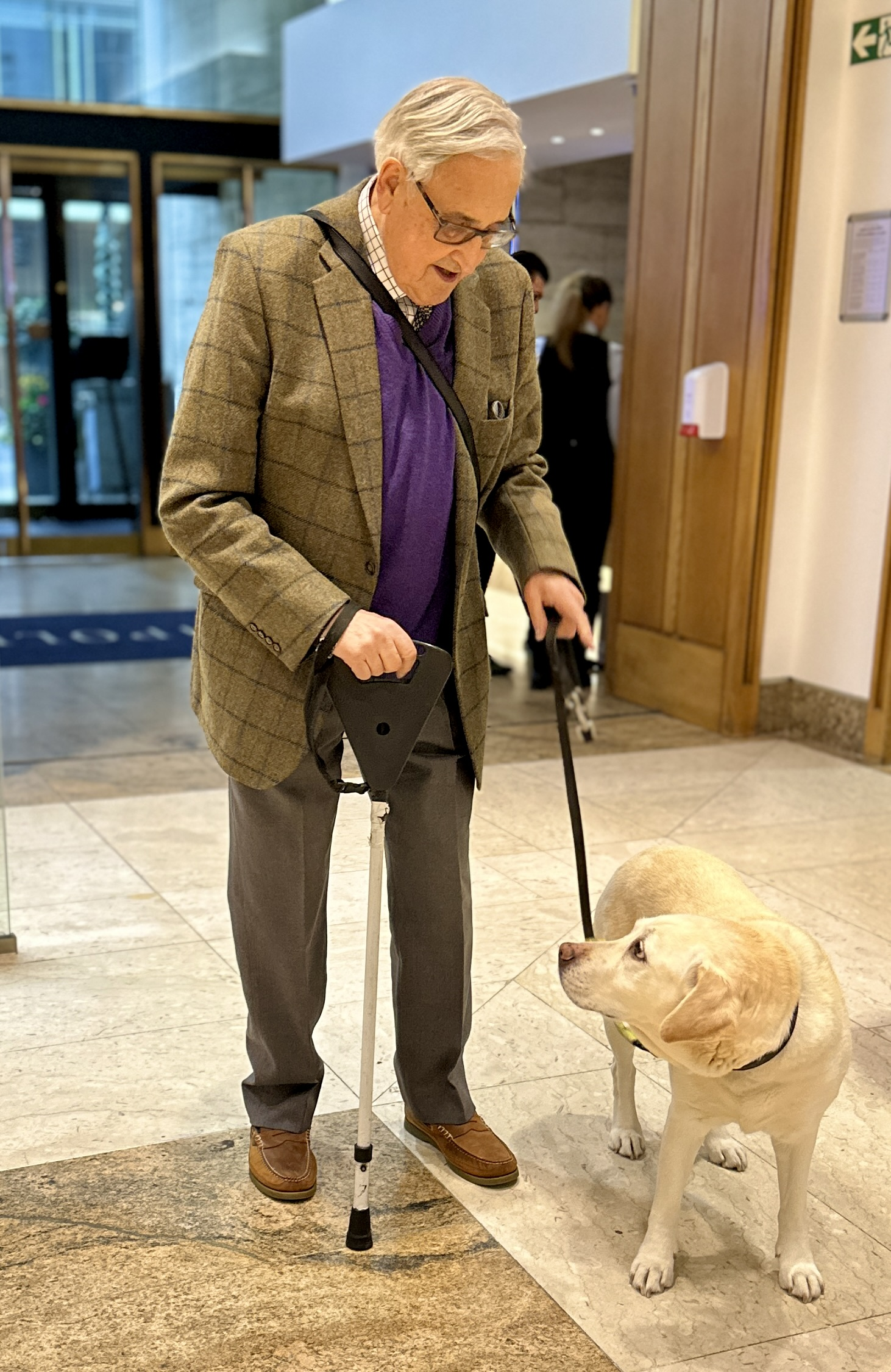
Harvey and his retired guide dog, Sunny, at the Royal Society of Medicine

In 1965, White married Diana Bannister. They have a daughter, Phyllida, and son Charles.

== Selected publications ==
- "Surgery in the eighteenth and nineteenth centuries," in Victor Cornelius Medvei and J. L. Thornton (eds.), The Royal Hospital of Saint Bartholomew, 1123–1973. London: St Bartholomew's Hospital, 1974.
- The Greater Omentum. Springer Verlag, 1983. (Edited jointly with Dorothea Liebermann-Meffert & E. Vaubel) ISBN 9783662023761
- A Colour Atlas of Omental Transposition for Advanced Breast Carcinoma. Wolfe Medical, 1987. ISBN 0815157533
- White, H (2002). "'For Merit'--in medicine". Journal of the Royal Society of Medicine. 95 (6): 309–10. doi:10.1177/014107680209500616. PMC 1279920. PMID 12042385.
- A Century of International Progress and Tradition in Surgery: An Illustrated History of the International Society of Surgery. Kaden Verlag, Heidelberg, 2001. (Jointly with Dorothea Liebermann-Meffert) ISBN 3-922777-42-2
- A Career in Medicine: Do You Have What it Takes? Royal Society of Medicine Press (RSMP), London, 2000. (Editor) ISBN 9781853154621
- Retiring from Medicine: Do You Have What it Takes? RSMPs, London, 2002. (Editor) ISBN 1853155020
- A History of the London Clinic: A celebration of 75 years. RSMP, London, 2007. ISBN 9781853157127

== See also ==
- List of honorary medical staff at King Edward VII's Hospital for Officers
