= Frederic William Hewitt =

British doctor (1857–1916)

- Born: 2 July 1857
- Died: 6 January 1916 (aged 58)

Sir Frederic William Hewitt M.V.O., (2 July 1857 – 6 January 1916), was an anaesthetist at the London Hospital for 15 years and later to King Edward VII. In 1904 he was listed as an honorary member of staff of the King Edward VII's Hospital.
