= Gilliat =

Gilliat is a surname. Notable people with the surname include:

- Bruce Gilliat, American businessman
- Cathy Gilliat-Smith, English hockey player
- John Saunders Gilliat, British banker
- Martin Gilliat, British soldier
- Richard Gilliat, English cricketer
- Rosemary Gilliat, Canadian photojournalist
- Sidney Gilliat, British film director
- Walter Gilliat, English footballer

== See also ==
- Gilliat River, Queensland, Australia
- Gilliatt, a surname
