= Shikandhini Kanagasundrem =

British-Sri Lankan scientist and microbiologist

Dr. Shikandhini Kanagasundrem MBE
- Born: Sri Lanka
- Education: St. Bridget's Convent, Colombo
- Alma mater: Middlesex Hospital Medical School
- Occupation: Microbiologist
- Spouse: Aynkaran Kanagasundrem
- Children: 2
- Awards: 2021 New Year Honours

Shikandhini Kanagasundrem also professionally known as Shico Visuvanathan MBE is a British-Sri Lankan microbiologist. Her grandfather Vythialingam Sivalingam was the first professor of Parasitology of Sri Lanka.

== Career ==
Shikandhini pursued her primary education at the St. Bridget's Convent, Colombo and moved to the United Kingdom for higher studies. She pursued her higher studies in medicine field at the Middlesex Hospital Medical School in London. She specialised with medical microbiology at the University College Hospital, London and completed her Doctor of medicine in clinical microbiology.

She has worked at the Princess Alexandra Hospital Trust in Essex, UK as a consultant microbiologist since 1994. She became the director of Infection Prevention of Princess Alexandra Hospital Trust in 2003. During her stint with Princess Alexandra Hospital Trust (PAHT), she was highly recognised and well known for implementing important vital changes and practices to reduce the risk of virus transmission rates.

== Honours ==
She was honoured by Queen Elizabeth II with a Member of the Most Excellent Order of the British Empire during the Queen's 2021 New Year Honours for her crucial service in microbiology and infection prevention and control, particularly during the middle of the COVID-19 pandemic in UK.
