= William Aldren Turner =

- Born: 5 May 1864; Edinburgh, Scotland, United Kingdom of Great Britain and Ireland
- Died: 29 July 1945 (aged 81); Edinburgh, Scotland, United Kingdom
- Education: University of Edinburgh
- Spouse: Helen Mary Mackenzie
- Scientific career
- Thesis: Observations on the anatomy and physiology of the central nervous system (1892)

William Aldren Turner (1864–1945) was a British specialist in neurology and a Fellow of the Royal College of Physicians.

== Early life ==
William Turner was born in Edinburgh on the 5 May 1864. He was the son of Sir William Turner, KC.B., F.R.S., Principal and Vice-Chancellor of the University of Edinburgh.

== Career ==
Turner worked for a term as House Physician at the Edinburgh Royal Infirmary. He then studied at Postgraduate level in both Berlin and St. Bartholomew’s Hospital, London. In 1892 he secured the job of assistant to the neurology lecturer, David Ferrier (1843–1928), at King's College London. He progressed to demonstrator and then lecturer in neuro-pathology there. He was elected to the post of assistant physician to King’s College Hospital in 1899. Turner was also on the staff roll at the National Hospital for the Paralysed and Epileptic for six years. Published works include 'Epilepsy, a study of the Idiopathic Disease' (1907) and 'Textbook of Nervous Diseases' (1910) jointly with Grainger Stewart. Helen Mary Mackenzie (daughter of Dr. J.A.Mac Dougall) married Turner in 1909 and they had three sons. One of his sons also specialized in work and research with epilepsy. In 1910 Turner gave the Morison lecture at the Royal College of Physicians of Edinburgh.

In 1920, he became a member of the War Office Committee of Enquiry into "Shell-shock", which published its final report in 1922.

== See also ==
- List of honorary medical staff at King Edward VII's Hospital for Officers
