= Shirley Wray =

British-American neuro-ophthalmologist

Shirley Heather Wray
- Education: University of Sheffield
- Known for: The Shirley H. Wray Neuro-Ophthalmology Collection
- Scientific career
- Fields: Neuro-ophthalmology
- Workplaces: Harvard Medical School
- Medical career
- Profession: Neurology, ophthalmology
- Sub-specialties: Neuro-ophthalmology
- Research: Alzheimer's disease

Shirley Heather Wray is a British-American neuro-ophthalmologist. She is former director of the Massachusetts General Hospital Unit for Neurovisual Disorders and Professor Emeritus of Neurology at Harvard Medical School.

== Background ==
Wray is the youngest of 7 children. She was born in Harrogate, England. Wray studied medicine at the University of Sheffield. She then worked as a cardiology fellow at Hammersmith Hospital for 2 years. She then worked at National Hospital for Neurology and Neurosurgery in Queen Square, London for 6 months alongside Roger Bannister. Wray then became a registrar at Middlesex Hospital where she completed her PhD from the University of London under Roger William Gilliatt. She also obtained Membership and then Fellowship of the Royal College of Physicians. Lord Brain recommended Wray to Raymond Delacy Adams and David Glendenning Cogan and she became a Postgraduate Clinical Research Fellow in Neuro-Ophthalmology at Harvard Medical School. Wray established the Neuro-Ophthalmology Virtual Educational Library (NOVEL) and has more than 25 academic publications.
