= Alekhitola =

Village in Bhojpur district in the Bihar, India

Alekhi Tola, also historically documented as Ulekhi Tolah, is a village in the Barahara block of the Bhojpur district in the Bihar.

== History ==
The earliest mention of the village is found in 1873 in a report, by Dr. J. H. Thornton, the then Civil Surgeon of Shahabad district, dated 28 July 1873. This report was submitted to the Deputy Surgeon-General, talked about cholera epidemic that swept through the region.

According to the account, the outbreak in Alekhi Tola (spelled as Ulekhi Tolah) occurred in June 1873. The epidemic had a significant impact on the village's small population, leading to 25 recorded cases of the disease and 9 deaths from it. This event was part of the fourth cholera pandemic, which affected the Indian subcontinent between 1863 and 1875.

== Geography ==
Alekhi Tola is a village in the Bhojpur district. It falls under the administrative jurisdiction of the Barahara block. The region is characterized by a flat, alluvial plain typical of the Gangetic basin in Bihar.

== Demographics and civic amenities ==
As of the 21st century, Alekhi Tola remains a populated village. It is served by the P.S. Alekhi Tola (East), a primary school established in 1956 and managed by the Department of Education, Government of Bihar. The school caters to grades 1 through 5.
