= John Cunningham (physician) =

Sir John Cunningham KCVO FRCP (born 1949) is a British professor of nephrology at University College London Medical School and the Royal Free Hospital. He is a former physician to the Queen.

== Biography ==
John Cunningham was born in 1949 and educated at Magdalen College School, Oxford, Trinity Hall, Cambridge (BA, 1970) and St John's College, Oxford (BM, BCh, 1973; DM, 1988). He also trained at Washington University School of Medicine, St. Louis, USA.

He became professor of nephrology at UCL Medical School, London and the Royal Free Hospital. He holds appointments at The London Clinic, and the King Edward VII Hospital, London.

He was Head of the Medical Household to Queen Elizabeth II from 2005 to 2014, and also occupied the position of Physician to the Queen. On stepping down, he was knighted by Queen Elizabeth II as a KCVO.

== Selected publications ==
- Achieving therapeutic targets in the treatment of secondary hyperparathyroidism.
- New Vitamin D analogs and changing therapeutic paradigms.

== See also ==
- List of honorary medical staff at King Edward VII's Hospital for Officers
