= William Gilliatt =

English gynaecologist

Sir William Gilliatt KCVO FRCP FRCS FRCOG (7 June 1884 – 27 September 1956) was an English gynaecologist at the Middlesex Hospital and King's College Hospital, London.

He was born in Boston, Lincolnshire, the son of William Gilliatt, and received his medical training at the Middlesex Hospital. After qualification in 1908, he held house appointments at the Middlesex as house physician, house surgeon, obstetric house physician and, finally, obstetric registrar and tutor. He was also elected to the staff of King's College Hospital in 1916, retiring as senior gynaecologist in 1946.

During the First World War he was commanding officer of the medical subsection of the hospitals at King's and St Thomas'.

He was the gynaecologist to the Royal Household for more than 20 years and attended Queen Elizabeth II at the births of Prince Charles and Princess Anne. He also attended the Duchess of Kent at the births of her three children. He was appointed a Commander of the Royal Victorian Order (CVO) in 1936. He was knighted in the 1948 Birthday Honours and KCVO in 1949.

He was elected President of the Royal College of Obstetricians and Gynaecologists from 1946 to 1949 and President of the Royal Society of Medicine for 1954 to 1956.

He died suddenly on 27 September 1956 as a result of a car accident in Chertsey. His wife was anaesthetist Dr Anne Louise Kann, daughter of John Kann of Lyne, Surrey. They had a son and a daughter. Son Roger William Gilliatt (30 July 1922 – 19 September 1991) was a British professor of neurology at the National Hospital, Queen Square, specialising in the peripheral nervous system. Daughter Elizabeth was a secretary to Sir Winston Churchill.
