= Francis Broderip =

English solicitor (1788–1871)

Francis Broderip (1788 – 17 July 1871) was an English solicitor of Lincoln's Inn, art collector, and philanthropist. In 1866, he gave £20,000 of Brazilian bonds to the Middlesex Hospital, London, on condition that the gift was kept secret during his lifetime. He also endowed the Law Society's Broderip Prize of a gold medal to a promising young lawyer. In 1987 the Broderip Ward was opened at the Middlesex Hospital, the first ward dedicated to the care and treatment of people affected by HIV/AIDS in the United Kingdom.

== Early life ==
Francis Broderip was born in Middlesex, in 1788, to Francis and Ann Broderip. He was christened at St Andrew's Church, Holborn, in March 1788.

== Career ==
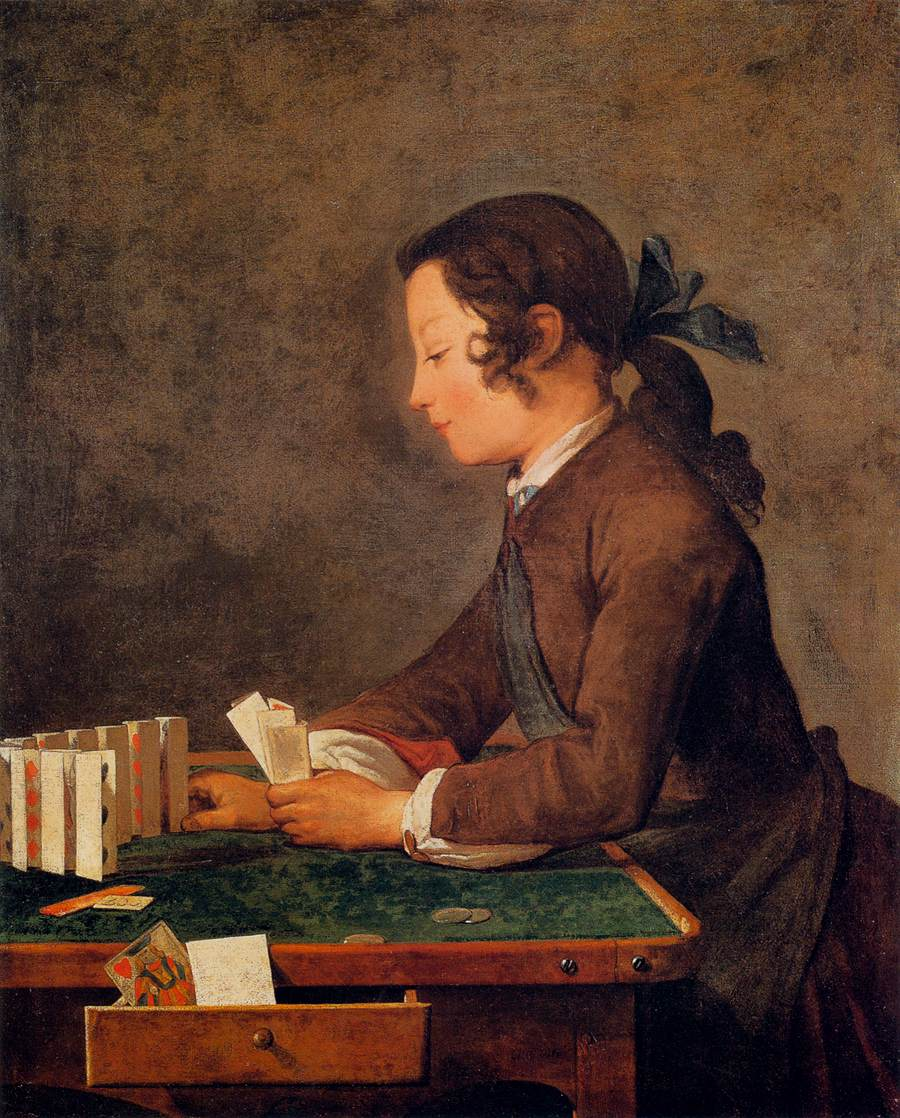
One version of The House of Cards by Jean Chardin. The version that Broderip owned has not been identified.

Broderip practiced as a solicitor in Lincoln's Inn. He endowed the Law Society's Broderip Prize of a gold medal to a promising young lawyer.

In 1866 he gave a gift of £20,000 4% Brazilian bonds (equivalent to £2,058,281 in 2025) to the Middlesex Hospital on condition that the gift was kept secret during his lifetime. His name was released as the donor immediately after his death.

He had a large art collection that was sold by Christie, Manson & Woods after his death in a sale of more than 1,500 lots that lasted nine days and included works in oil, watercolour, drawings, bronzes, ivories, porcelain, miniatures, and furniture. There were five works by J. M. W. Turner, The Little Scribe by William Etty, landscapes by Thomas Creswick, Boy with a House of Cards by Jean Chardin, and a Scene from Le Diable Boiteux by Augustus Egg. The image of a boy building a house of cards has traditionally been interpreted as a metaphor for the fragility of life and the temptations facing the young.

== Death and legacy ==
Broderip lived on Gower Street in Bloomsbury, in a house that was later occupied by women's suffrage pioneer Millicent Fawcett (1847–1929) and is now a grade II listed building. He died there on 17 July 1871, aged 82 or 83, leaving an estate of under £160,000 which was later resworn as under £180,000. (equivalent to £18,331,561 in 2025) The sale of his pictures in February 1872 raised £20,000 which was donated to the Middlesex Hospital. The same year, the governors of the hospital created two Broderip scholarships in his memory and the Clayton Ward was renamed the Broderip Ward.

In 1987, the Broderip Ward was opened at the Middlesex Hospital, the first ward dedicated to the care and treatment of people affected by HIV/AIDS in the United Kingdom.
