= Thomas Crisp English =

British surgeon

Sir Thomas Crisp English, born Thomas Johnston English, KCMG (22 July 1878 - 25 August 1949) was a British surgeon at St George's Hospital, and consulting surgeon to Queen Alexandra Military Hospital, Millbank, the Royal Hospital Chelsea, and to King Edward VII's Hospital for Officers.

== See also ==
+List of honorary medical staff at King Edward VII's Hospital for Officers
