= Charles Arthur Morris =

British surgeon (1860–1942)

Charles Arthur Morris FRCS CVO (1860–1942), was a British surgeon to the King Edward VII's Hospital for Officers during the Boer War in South Africa. In 1914 he was on the list of honorary medical staff at the hospital, compiled by Sister Agnes, with whom he was good friends, and served at the hospital during the First World War.
