= Caroline Moore (academic) =

Professor of Urology at University College London

Caroline M. Moore
- Occupation: Urologist

Academic background
- Education: St George's, University of London
- Thesis: "Photodynamic therapy for Prostate Cancer" (2007)

Caroline M. Moore is the first woman to be made a professor of urology in the United Kingdom. She works in the diagnosis and treatment of prostate cancer at University College London.

Her research on evaluating photodynamic therapy for prostate cancer, became the subject of her MD, which was completed in 2007, and led to the first completed randomised trial comparing focal treatment for prostate cancer with active surveillance.

== Early life and education ==
Caroline Moore was born in Chester, and moved to Wombourne at the age of five. She was educated at St. Edmunds Catholic College before gaining admission to study medicine at St George's Hospital Medical School, London, from where she graduated in 1997.

== Research and career ==
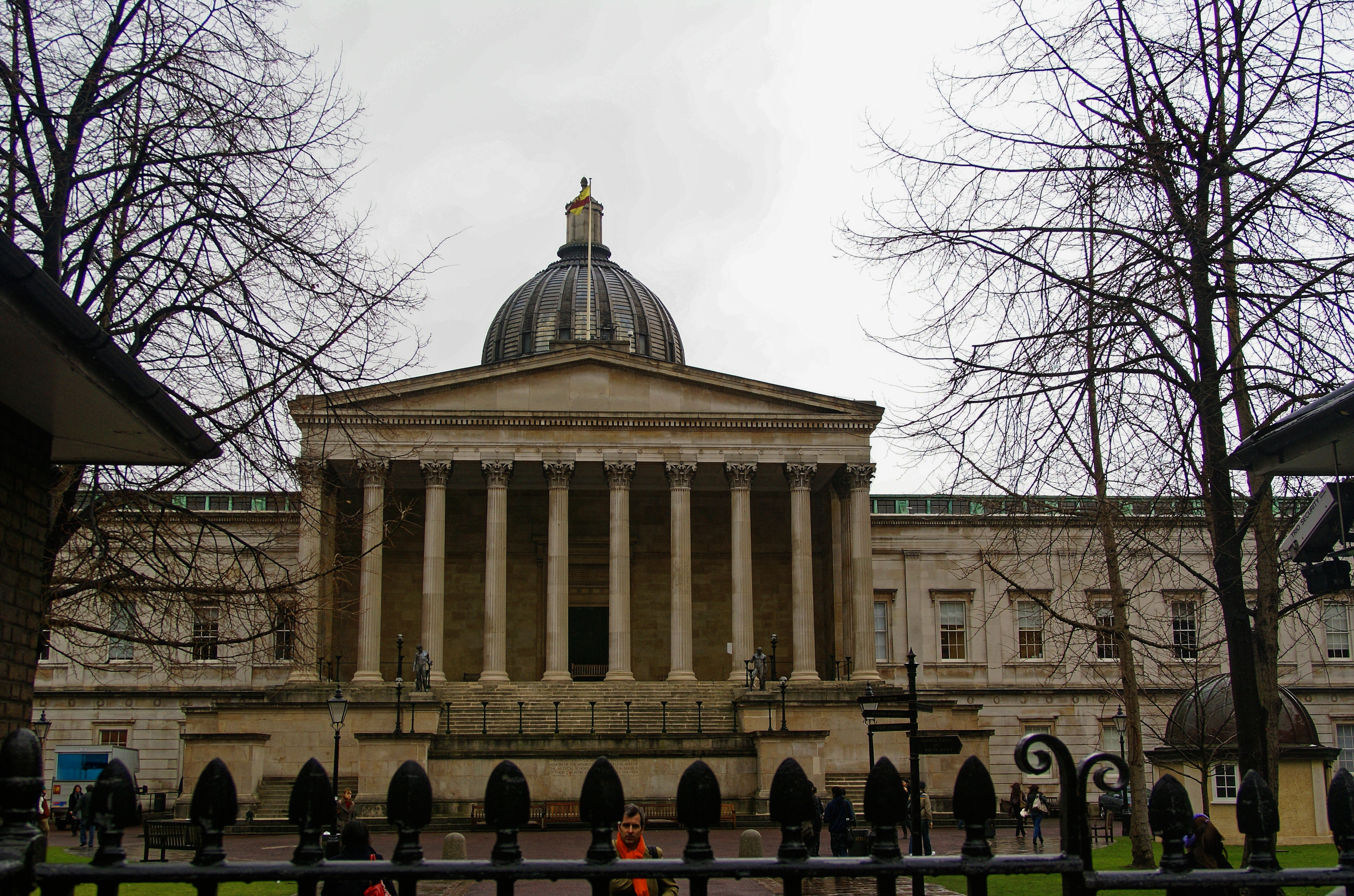
University College London

After completing her early medical training in London, she gained membership of the Royal College of Surgeons, who subsequently awarded her a research fellowship. Her research began in 2002 on evaluating photodynamic therapy for prostate cancer. It became the subject of her MD, which was completed in 2007, and led to the first completed randomised trial comparing focal treatment for prostate cancer with active surveillance. Later, she published the first study using magnetic resonance imaging (MRI) to evaluate treatment in early prostate cancer.

Moore started using MRI to detect prostate cancer in men who would not need treatment, and found that if biopsies were performed before MRI scans the images were blurred.

In October 2012 she established a committee on Standards in Reporting in MRI-targeted biopsy (START). The recommendations included reporting histologic results of standard cores using Gleason scores and maximum core cancer length, as well as reporting the recruitment criteria, radiologist experience and population biopsy status of a particular trial. She has worked on a combination of multi-parametric MRI and cognitive fusion transperineal biopsy, which can reduce the time taken diagnose and treat diseases. She has found that using MRI can reduce the need for biopsies by 28%. In 2019, her MRI protocols were approved by the National Institute for Health and Care Excellence (NICE), and incorporated into national guidance for the investigation of men suspected of having clinically localised prostate cancer.

Moore has developed electronic psychometric patient-reported outcome measures to monitor men who have had radical prostatectomy. Men who have this surgery can suffer from urinary leakage and difficulties with erections. The survey allows researchers to track their progress and share information with their surgical teams. Moore has been among a group of researchers spread across six hospitals who have been investigating high-intensity focused ultrasound (HIFU) as a treatment for prostate cancer. Five years after treatment with HIFU the cancer survival rate is 100%, the same as for the more traditional methods of surgery and radiotherapy, but with fewer side-effects.

She has been Head of Urology at University College London, within the Division of Surgical and Interventional Sciences since 2018. She was senior author on the Prostate Evaluation for Clinically Important Disease: Sampling Using Image Guidance or Not? (PRECISION) study comparing standard prostate biopsy and MRI-targeted biopsy.

In 2019 Moore was the first woman in the United Kingdom to be made a Professor of Urology. Her research has been supported by Prostate Cancer UK, the Movember Foundation, the Cancer Vaccine Institute, the National Institute for Health Research, the European Association of Urology Research Foundation, the Wellcome Trust and the Department of Health.

== Other roles ==
She serves on the board of the European Association of Urology Research Foundation.

She has served as a science consultant for the science comic Surgeon X.

== Awards ==
Moore was part of the team that was awarded The BMJ "UK Research Paper" of the year.

== Personal and family ==
Moore has four children.

== Selected publications ==
- Moore, Caroline M.; Robertson, Nicola L.; Arsanious, Nasr; Middleton, Thomas; Villers, Arnauld; Klotz, Laurence; Taneja, Samir S.; Emberton, Mark (January 2013). "Image-Guided Prostate Biopsy Using Magnetic Resonance Imaging–Derived Targets: A Systematic Review". European Urology. 63 (1): 125–140. doi:10.1016/j.eururo.2012.06.004. PMID 22743165. (Joint author)
- Moore, Caroline M.; Kasivisvanathan, Veeru; Eggener, Scott; Emberton, Mark; Fütterer, Jurgen J.; Gill, Inderbir S.; Grubb Iii, Robert L.; Hadaschik, Boris; Klotz, Laurence; Margolis, Daniel J.A.; Marks, Leonard S.; Melamed, Jonathan; Oto, Aytekin; Palmer, Suzanne L.; Pinto, Peter; Puech, Philippe; Punwani, Shonit; Rosenkrantz, Andrew B.; Schoots, Ivo G.; Simon, Richard; Taneja, Samir S.; Turkbey, Baris; Ukimura, Osamu; Van Der Meulen, Jan; Villers, Arnauld; Watanabe, Yuji; START Consortium (October 2013). "Standards of reporting for MRI-targeted biopsy studies (START) of the prostate: recommendations from an International Working Group". European Urology. 64 (4): 544–552. doi:10.1016/j.eururo.2013.03.030. ISSN 1873-7560. PMID 23537686. (Joint author)
- Moore, Caroline M.; Kasivisvanathan, Veeru; Eggener, Scott; Emberton, Mark; Fütterer, Jurgen J.; Gill, Inderbir S.; Grubb Iii, Robert L.; Hadaschik, Boris; Klotz, Laurence; Margolis, Daniel J.A.; Marks, Leonard S.; Melamed, Jonathan; Oto, Aytekin; Palmer, Suzanne L.; Pinto, Peter; Puech, Philippe; Punwani, Shonit; Rosenkrantz, Andrew B.; Schoots, Ivo G.; Simon, Richard; Taneja, Samir S.; Turkbey, Baris; Ukimura, Osamu; Van Der Meulen, Jan; Villers, Arnauld; Watanabe, Yuji; START Consortium (2013). "Standards of reporting for MRI-targeted biopsy studies (START) of the prostate: recommendations from an International Working Group". European Urology. 64 (4): 544–552. doi:10.1016/j.eururo.2013.03.030. ISSN 1873-7560. PMID 23537686. (Joint author)
- Bass, Edward James; Freeman, Alex; Jameson, Charles; Punwani, Shonit; Moore, Caroline M.; Arya, Manit; Emberton, Mark; Ahmed, Hashim Uddin (October 2018). "Prostate cancer diagnostic pathway: Is a one-stop cognitive MRI targeted biopsy service a realistic goal in everyday practice? A pilot cohort in a tertiary referral centre in the UK". BMJ Open. 8 (10) e024941. doi:10.1136/bmjopen-2018-024941. ISSN 2044-6055. PMC 6224764. PMID 30361408. (Joint author)
- Kasivisvanathan, Veeru; et al. (10 May 2018). "MRI-Targeted or Standard Biopsy for Prostate-Cancer Diagnosis" (PDF). The New England Journal of Medicine. 378 (19): 1767–1777. doi:10.1056/NEJMoa1801993. ISSN 1533-4406. PMC 9084630. PMID 29552975. S2CID 205103063. (Joint author)

== See also ==
- List of honorary medical staff at King Edward VII's Hospital for Officers
