= Roger Vickers =

British orthopaedic surgeon

Sir Roger Vickers
- Born: 1945 (age 80–81)
- Medical career
- Profession: Surgeon
- Field: Orthopedics
- Institutions: St George's Hospital; King Edward VII's Hospital (1992 - 2011)

Sir Roger Henry Vickers KCVO (born 1945) is a British orthopaedic surgeon, who had been part of the Medical Household as an Orthopaedic Surgeon to the Queen and was later appointed Serjeant Surgeon.

== Biography ==
Roger Vickers is the son of Henry Renwick Vickers (1911–1993), a noted dermatologist who was elected a Fellow of the Royal College of Physicians in 1950 and served as president of the British Association of Dermatology in 1966. He studied at Magdalen College, Oxford, and then trained at St Thomas's Hospital, earning his medical degree in 1970.

Vickers became an orthopaedic senior registrar in 1977 and three years later joined St George's Hospital as a consultant orthopaedic surgeon. In 1992, he joined King Edward VII's Hospital for Officers and the Medical Household as the Orthopaedic Surgeon to the Queen and in 2006 he was appointed Serjeant Surgeon to the Queen. He led Queen Elizabeth the Queen Mother's surgical team in 1998 when she underwent hip replacement surgery. In 2003, he also performed an operation on Elizabeth II to remove cartilage from her knee and benign skin lesions.

He retired from the Royal Household in 2010 and was appointed a Knight Commander of the Royal Victorian Order in that year's Birthday Honours. He was elected a Fellow of the Royal College of Surgeons in 1975.

== See also ==
- List of honorary medical staff at King Edward VII's Hospital for Officers
