= Jonathan Jeffers =

Mechanical engineer

Jonathan Jeffers is a mechanical engineer and Professor of Mechanical Engineering at Imperial College London. He was awarded a Research Professorship by the National Institute for Health and Care Research (NIHR), the first engineer to receive this award. His research focuses on improving surgical treatment of osteoarthritis.

== Early life and education ==
Jonathan Jeffers studied Mechanical Engineering at Trinity College Dublin. He also has a PhD from the University of Southampton.

== Career and research ==
His research focuses on topics such as orthopedic implants, external stabilisers for broken bones and biomechanics in hip surgery. He is also a co-investigator at the Smart Materials Hub of the UK Regenerative Medicine Platform. During the COVID-19 pandemic, he worked on 3D printing FFP3 face masks through injection moulding.

He was awarded an NIHR Research Professorship in 2019 for his research on improving treatment options for osteoarthritis after early intervention orthopaedic surgery.

Jeffers is the Chief Technology Officer of OSSTEC, a company that manufactures orthopaedic implants using 3D printing. He was a co-founder of Additive Instruments, which was acquired by Smith&Nephew in 2023.
