= Arnold Lawson =

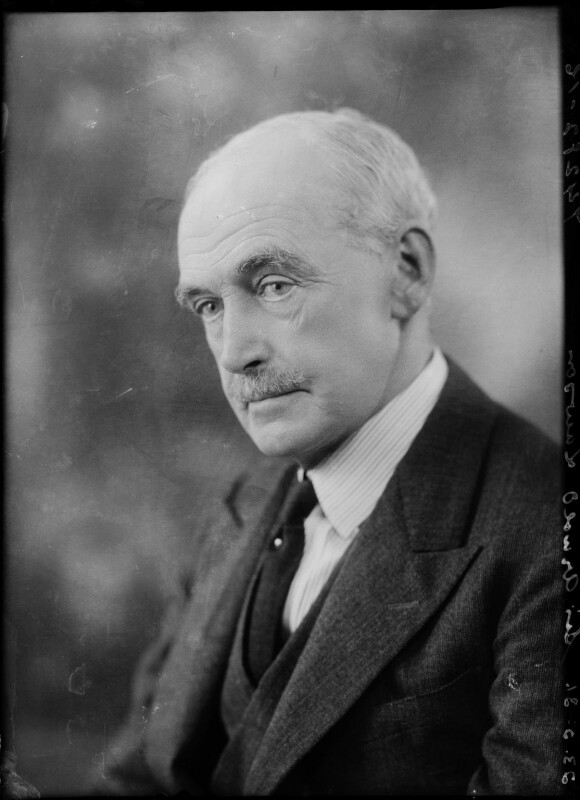
Lawson in 1931

Sir Arnold Lawson (4 December 1867 - 19 January 1947) was a British ophthalmologist. During the First World War, he was on the list of honorary consultants at King Edward VII's Hospital for Officers, a list drawn up by Sister Agnes in 1914. He was responsible for the care of blinded servicemen at St Dunstan's Hospital for Blinded Soldiers and Sailors.
