= Communist Party of Canada (Ontario) candidates in the 1985 Ontario provincial election =

The Communist Party of Canada - Ontario fielded a number of candidates in the 1985 provincial election, none of whom were elected. Information about these candidates may be found here.

== Mike Sterling (Oakwood) ==
Sterling was involved with the Committee for Racial Equality in the early 1980s. He was thirty-three years old during the 1985 election, and was an unemployed social worker. He received 327 votes (1.31%), finishing fourth against New Democratic Party incumbent Tony Grande.

== Edward McDonald (York East) ==
McDonald moved to Canada from Glasgow, Scotland in 1951. He was an industrial worker for Canada Westinghouse, served as national representative for the United Electrical Workers Union, and began working full-time for the Communist Party in 1972. He was a perennial candidate for the party at the provincial and federal levels. McDonald worked to strengthen Canada's anti-racism laws in the 1970s, and was secretary of Toronto's United May Day Committee in the 1980s. He was fifty-four years old during the 1981 election.

Electoral record
Election	Division	Party	Votes	%	Place	Winner
1972 federal	Windsor—Walkerville	N/A (Communist)	317		4/4	Mark MacGuigan, Liberal
1974 federal	Sudbury	Communist	210		4/4	James Jerome, Liberal
1975 provincial	Riverdale	Communist	288		4/7	Jim Renwick, New Democratic Party
1979 federal	Hamilton West	Communist	161		4/5	Lincoln Alexander, Progressive Conservative
1980 federal	Broadview—Greenwood	Communist	164	0.51	6/9	Bob Rae, New Democratic Party
1981 provincial	York East	Communist	628		4/5	Robert Elgie, Progressive Conservative
1985 provincial	York East	Communist	929		4/5	Robert Elgie, Progressive Conservative
