= The AIDS Memorial in London =

- Interactive map of The AIDS Memorial in London
- Location: South Crescent in Fitzrovia
- Coordinates: 51.5195°N 0.1321°W
- Designer: Anya Gallaccio
- Type: Sculpture
- Completion date: 2027 (planned)
- Dedicated to: People affected by HIV & AIDS in London and later the UK
- Website: aidsmemory.uk/aids-memorial/

The AIDS Memorial in London is a memorial to people affected by HIV & AIDS in the United Kingdom. It will be designed by Anya Gallaccio and is due to be completed in late 2027.

The memorial will be funded by various sources and overseen by AIDS Memory UK, a charitable incorporated organisation registered in 2023 with the purpose "To commemorate those who lost their lives in the HIV/AIDS epidemic, to give comfort to those who grieve their loss and highlight the impact of HIV/AIDS on the lives of the communities most affected".

As of 2025, early funders include £130,000 from Greater London Authority under Sadiq Khan, £27,000 from Arts Council England and private philanthropy including a significant amount from Douglas Atkin of £100,000.

Their contributions have enabled AIDS Memory UK to run a competition to secure a new public artwork by Anya Gallaccio; to apply for planning permission from the London Borough of Camden and to R&D an associated cultural programme to add meaning to HIV over the last nearly 50 years and to give reasons for the delivery of The AIDS Memorial in London now.

A public competition was run to design and create a new public artwork. From a shortlist including London artists Ryan Gander, Harold Offeh, Shahpour Pouyan and Diana Puntar, the competition was won by former Turner Prize nominee Anya Gallaccio.

AIDS Memory UK was founded by playwright Ash Kotak and is led by a team of trustees working in collaboration with leading public arts experts including:

- Ash Kotak — founder, artistic director and cultural programme lead
- Stephanie Allen — chair of trustees, AIDS Memory UK
- Cynthia Grant — project manager, AIDS Memory UK
- Vivien Lovell and Jenni Lomax, from Modus Operandi — art consultants
- Alex Arestis — public realm design
- Joel Cockhill — NRP. highways, transport
- Peter Laidler — structures and materials
- Natalie Davies — planning consultant
- Matt Railton from Four PR — public liaison

AIDS Memory UK's Affected Communities Advisory board includes Jonathan Blake, Topher Campbell, Jide Macaulay and Simon Watney.

== Design ==
The memorial will feature a seating area designed as the hollowed out rings of a tree trunk. It will be located in South Crescent, Store Street in Fitzrovia. The site has been chosen for its proximity to the Middlesex Hospital, James Pringle House and The Bloomsbury Clinic.
