= Edward Lawson McDonald =

Cardiologist to the National Heart Hospital

Edward Lawson McDonald (8 February 1918 – 13 January 2007), was a cardiologist to the National Heart Hospital, King Edward VII's Hospital for Officers, London, and to King Edward VII Hospital, Midhurst. His early research focussed on valvular heart disease, and later on the role of platelets and fibrinogen in coronary heart disease.
