= Cystourethrography =

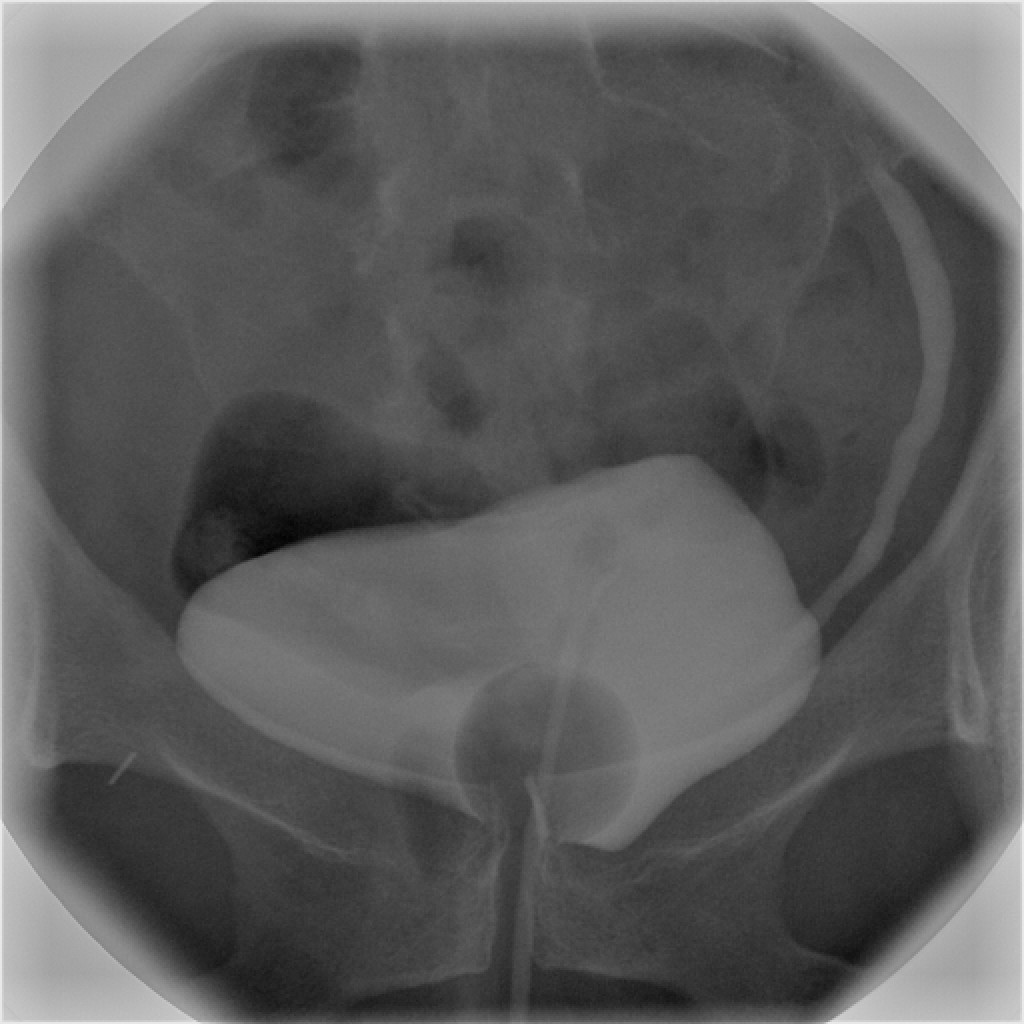
- Cystography image showing contrast in the urinary bladder and left ureter (right side of image).
- ICD-9: 87.77
- OPS-301 code: 3-13f

Cystourethrography is a radiographic, fluoroscopic medical procedure that is used to visualize and evaluate the bladder and the urethra. Voiding and positive pressure cystourethrograms help to assess lower urinary tract trauma, reflux, suspected fistulas, and to diagnose urinary retention. Magnetic imaging (MRI) has been replacing this diagnostic tool due to its increased sensitivity. This imaging technique is used to diagnose hydronephrosis, voiding anomalies, and urinary tract infections in children. abnormalities.

Cysourethrography includes the voiding cystourethrogram (VCUG) and positive pressure urethrogram (PPUG).

== Complications ==
"These complications that can occur in both sexes include UTI, hematuria, cystitis as well as urinary dysfunction following a catheterization, phobia of urination, nocturia, and stopping urination. In the literature, psychological trauma resulting from VCUG was considered the same as from a violent rape, especially in girls."
