= Civil surgeon =

Doctor examining immigrants to the US

Civil Surgeon
Occupation
- Occupation type: Medical doctor
- Activity sectors: Immigration services

Description
- Competencies: Medical knowledge and experience
- Education required: Medical degree, license to practice
- Fields of employment: Government, private practices

In the United States, a civil surgeon is designated by the U.S. Citizenship and Immigration Services (USCIS) to conduct medical examinations of immigrants applying for certain visas, adjustment of status, and other immigration benefits. Civil surgeons play an important role in ensuring that immigrants are medically fit to enter the U.S. and do not pose a risk to public health.

To become a civil surgeon, a doctor must first obtain a medical degree and a license to practice medicine in the state where they will be conducting immigration-related medical examinations. They must then apply to the USCIS and meet certain eligibility criteria, which include demonstrating knowledge of immigration laws and regulations related to medical examinations. Once approved, civil surgeons are authorized to conduct immigration-related medical examinations and complete the required medical forms for immigration applications.

During a medical examination, a civil surgeon performs a physical examination of the applicant, reviews their medical history, and administers required laboratory tests and vaccinations. The civil surgeon is responsible for determining whether the applicant has any medical conditions that would make them inadmissible to the U.S. or require follow-up medical care. Civil surgeons must conduct these examinations according to instructions published by CDC.

Civil surgeons can be employed by the government or work in private practices. They must adhere to strict standards and guidelines set by the USCIS and the U.S. Department of Health and Human Services. The role of civil surgeons is to provide an objective and unbiased medical assessment of immigrants applying for entry into the U.S.

Civil surgeons are an essential component of the U.S. immigration system, ensuring that immigrants are medically fit to enter the country. Their work helps to protect public health and prevent the spread of communicable diseases.

== British use ==
The term civil surgeon has historical significance and is used in various contexts where British colonial influence extended. The role evolved over time and could vary based on the specific needs and circumstances of different regions within the former British Empire.

For instance, in 19th century colonial India, medical services were realigned into either military or civilian. During times of peace, military surgeons concentrated on research. Within this context, the civil surgeon focused on hospitals, clinics, and prisons. The Civil Surgeon was the chief Indian Medical Service (IMS) officer in a district with powers similar to a District Magistrate (high ranking officers of the Indian Civil Service).

Nowadays, in India, the civil surgeon title is most often reserved for a civil officer in charge of the health services of the district who manages their staff to provide preventive, promotive and curative services to the general public within his district.
