= Middlesex Hospital =

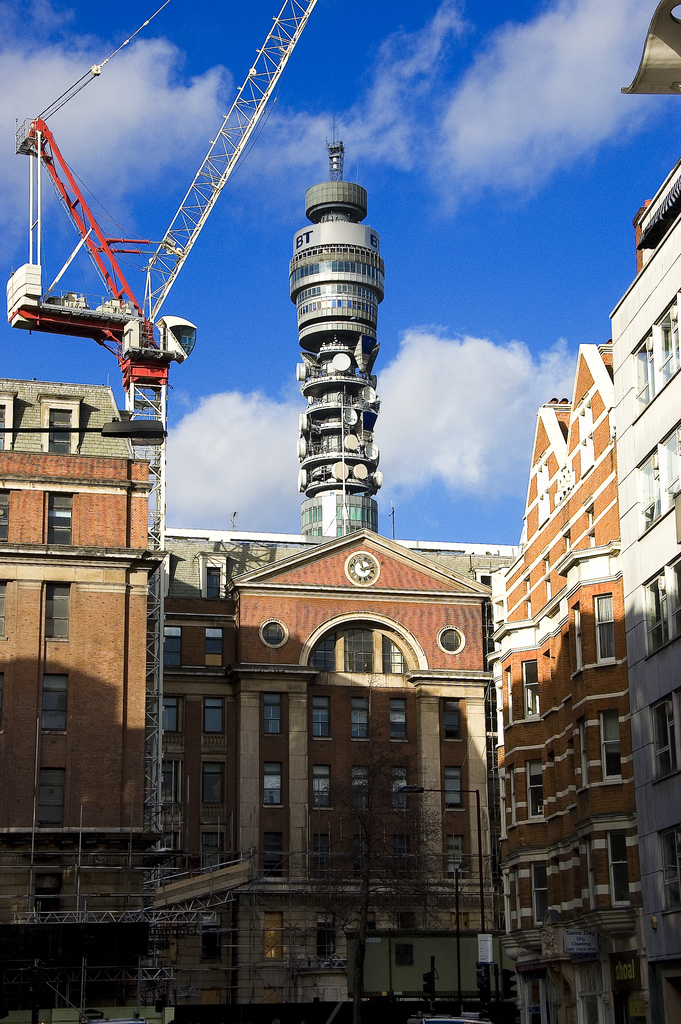
- The hospital in September 2007, shortly before demolition (BT Tower in background)

- Location within Westminster

Geography
- Location: Fitzrovia, London, England
- Coordinates: 51.5190°N 0.1377°W

Organisation
- Care system: NHS England
- Type: General
- Affiliated university: University College London

Services
- Emergency department: Yes

History
- Founded: 1745, moved 1757, rebuilt 1928
- Closed: 2005

Links
- Lists: Hospitals in England

Middlesex Hospital was a teaching hospital located in the Fitzrovia area of London, England. First opened as the Middlesex Infirmary in 1745 on Windmill Street, it was moved in 1757 to Mortimer Street where it remained until it was finally closed in 2005. Its staff and services were transferred to various sites within the University College London Hospitals NHS Trust. The Middlesex Hospital Medical School, with a history dating back to 1746, merged with UCL Medical School in 1987. The Broderip Ward, which opened in 1987, was the first ward dedicated to the care and treatment of people affected by HIV/AIDS in the United Kingdom.

== History ==
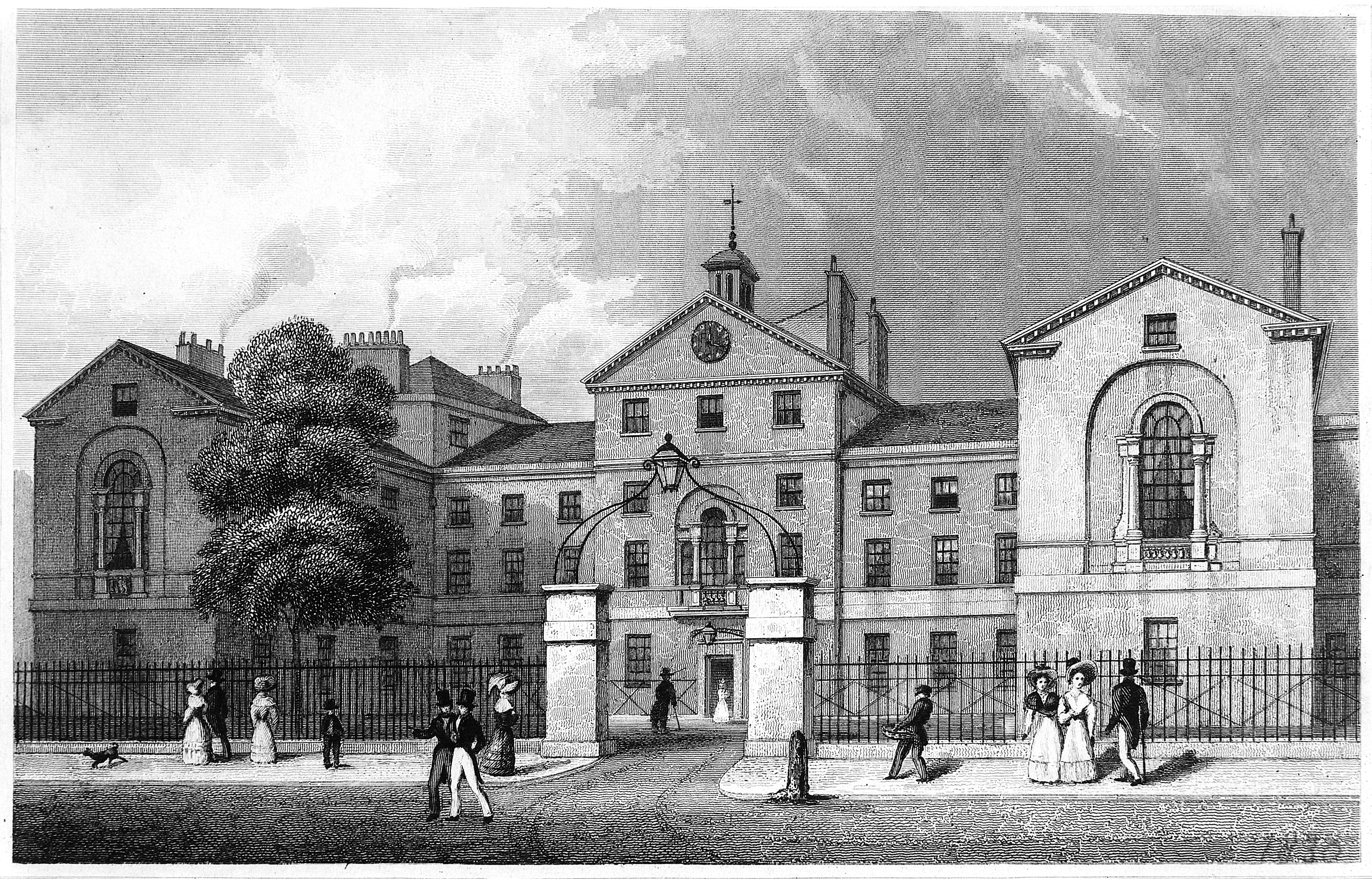
Engraving of Middlesex Hospital seen from the south in 1830

=== Development of the hospital ===
The first Middlesex Hospital, which was named after the county of Middlesex, opened as the Middlesex Infirmary in Windmill Street in 1745. The infirmary started with 15 beds to provide medical treatment for the poor. Funding came from subscriptions and, in 1747, the hospital became the first in England to add lying-in (maternity) beds. Prior to 1773, the wards in the hospital were named as 'Mens long ward', 'Mens square ward up one pair of stairs' or 'two pairs of stairs'. Names of wards later followed after the chief nurse of each ward. Naming of wards for several governors and medical staff of the hospital began with wards Percy, Clayton, Villeneau and Pyke, named after Hugh Percy, 1st Duke of Northumberland, Sir Kenrick Clayton, John Villeneau and the benefactor Pyke, respectively. The large amount local construction work resulted in one-in-four admissions being due to trauma, and Percy ward became the accident ward.

The foundation stone for the second Middlesex Hospital, in Mortimer Street, was laid by the hospital's president, the Earl of Northumberland, in 1755. The central block of the new hospital opened in 1757.

Over the years extra wings were added but, in 1924, it was decided that the building was structurally unsound and an entirely new building would be required. The Duke of York, later King George VI, having visited the hospital on 26 June 1928 to lay the foundation stone of the new building, returned on 29 May 1935 to open the completed building. The hospital had been completely rebuilt, on the same site and in stages, without ever being closed, paid for by more than £1 million of donations from members of the public.

In 1930 a children's ward opened in the West Wing of the hospital. The Bernhard Baron Ward, originally called the Babies Ward, was decorated with panels of tiles depicting nursery rhymes and pictures of trees, birds and animals. On one wall a large picture depicted a fairground roundabout surrounded by fairground activities such as Punch and Judy. Another wall had a tile picture of maypole dancing. The tiles have been preserved in the Jackfield Tile Museum at Ironbridge Gorge.

After coming under the management of the Bloomsbury Health Authority in 1980, the Middlesex Hospital became associated with various specialist hospitals in the local area. In 1992 the local urology hospitals, St Paul's, St Peter's and St Philip's, were closed down with services transferred to new accommodation in the Middlesex Hospital.

=== Middlesex Hospital Medical School ===
The Middlesex Hospital Medical School traced its origins to 1746 (a year after the foundation of the Middlesex Hospital), when students were 'walking the wards'. The motto of the medical school, Miseris succurrere disco, was provided by one of the deans, Dr William Cayley, from Virgil's passage about Queen Dido aiding a shipwreck: Non ignara mali, miseris succurrere disco ('Not unacquainted with misfortune myself, I learn to succour the distressed').

At the establishment of the then London University (now University College London), the governors of the Middlesex Hospital declined permission of the former's medical students to use the wards of the Middlesex Hospital for clinical training. This refusal prompted the foundation of the North London Hospital, now University College Hospital, in 1834.

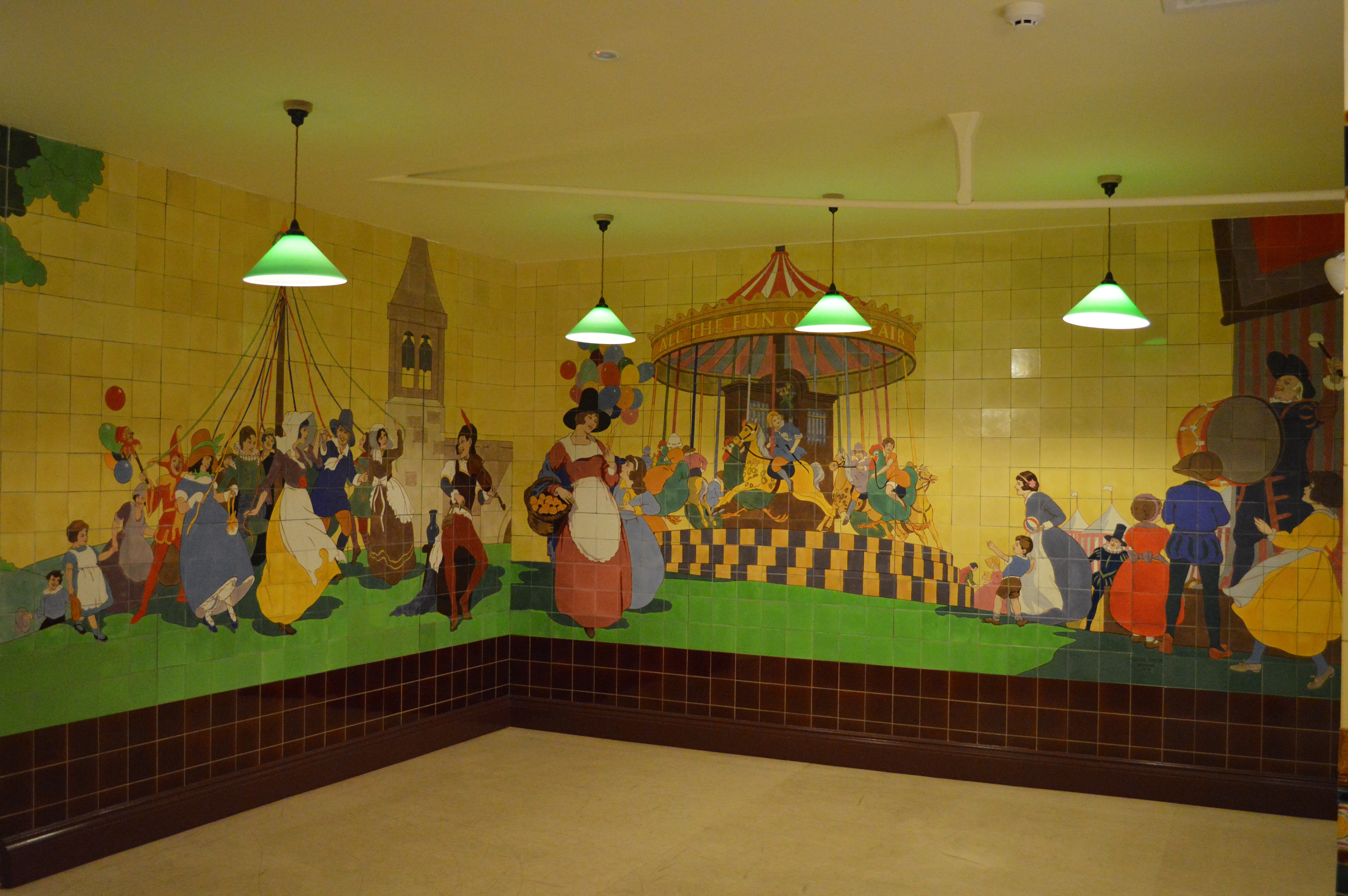
Mural from Middlesex Hospital at Jackfield Tile Museum

The Courtauld Institute of Biochemistry of the Middlesex Hospital Medical School was opened by Samuel Courtauld in 1928, the foundation stone having been laid on 20 July 1927. Its main entrance was in Riding House Street. Courtauld also endowed a Chair of Biochemistry.

The medical schools of the Middlesex Hospital and University College Hospital merged in 1987 to form the University College and Middlesex School of Medicine (UCMSM). UCMSM itself merged with the Royal Free Hospital School of Medicine in 1998 to form the UCL Medical School.

=== Broderip Ward and the Early AIDS Crisis ===
The Broderip Ward, named for 19th century benefactor Francis Broderip, was the first ward dedicated to the care and treatment of people affected by HIV/AIDS in the United Kingdom. The Broderip Ward took its first patients in January 1987, and was officially opened by Diana, Princess of Wales, on 9 April 1987. None of the patients agreed to be photographed with Diana at the opening of the ward due to fears of being publicly identified. Diana notably shook the hand of patients without wearing gloves on the ward. Diana subsequently visited the ward with the First Lady of the United States, Barbara Bush, in July 1991.

Patients on the ward participated in the early trials of zidovudine, and new antiretroviral medicines.

The site of the AIDS Memorial in London has been chosen for its proximity to the Middlesex Hospital and the Bloomsbury Clinic.

=== Closure and redevelopment ===
The Middlesex Hospital closed in December 2005. The main hospital building in Mortimer Street was sold to developer Project Abbey (Guernsey) Ltd, a company controlled by Christian and Nick Candy, and was demolished in 2008. The building was used, just before it was demolished, in the film Eastern Promises. Candy and Candy failed in plans to redevelop the site into a 273-apartment luxury accommodation complex, named "NoHo Square", and transferred the property to the nationalised Icelandic bank, Kaupthing Bank.

The site was purchased by Clive Bush and Daniel Van Gelder's Exemplar Properties and Aviva Investors in July 2010. Exemplar decided against retaining either the Candy and Candy designs or the NoHo Square name, and instead appointed new architects in Lifschutz Davidson Sandilands and Sheppard Robson to prepare new designs. Following a public exhibition, a planning application for the proposed scheme was submitted in September 2011.

Planning consent for the new development, now called Fitzroy Place, was granted in February 2012. The new development, which combines 295 homes with 240,000 square feet (22,000 m^{2}) of offices, including the regional headquarters for cosmetics multinational Estée Lauder, was completed in 2016.

=== Fitzrovia Chapel ===
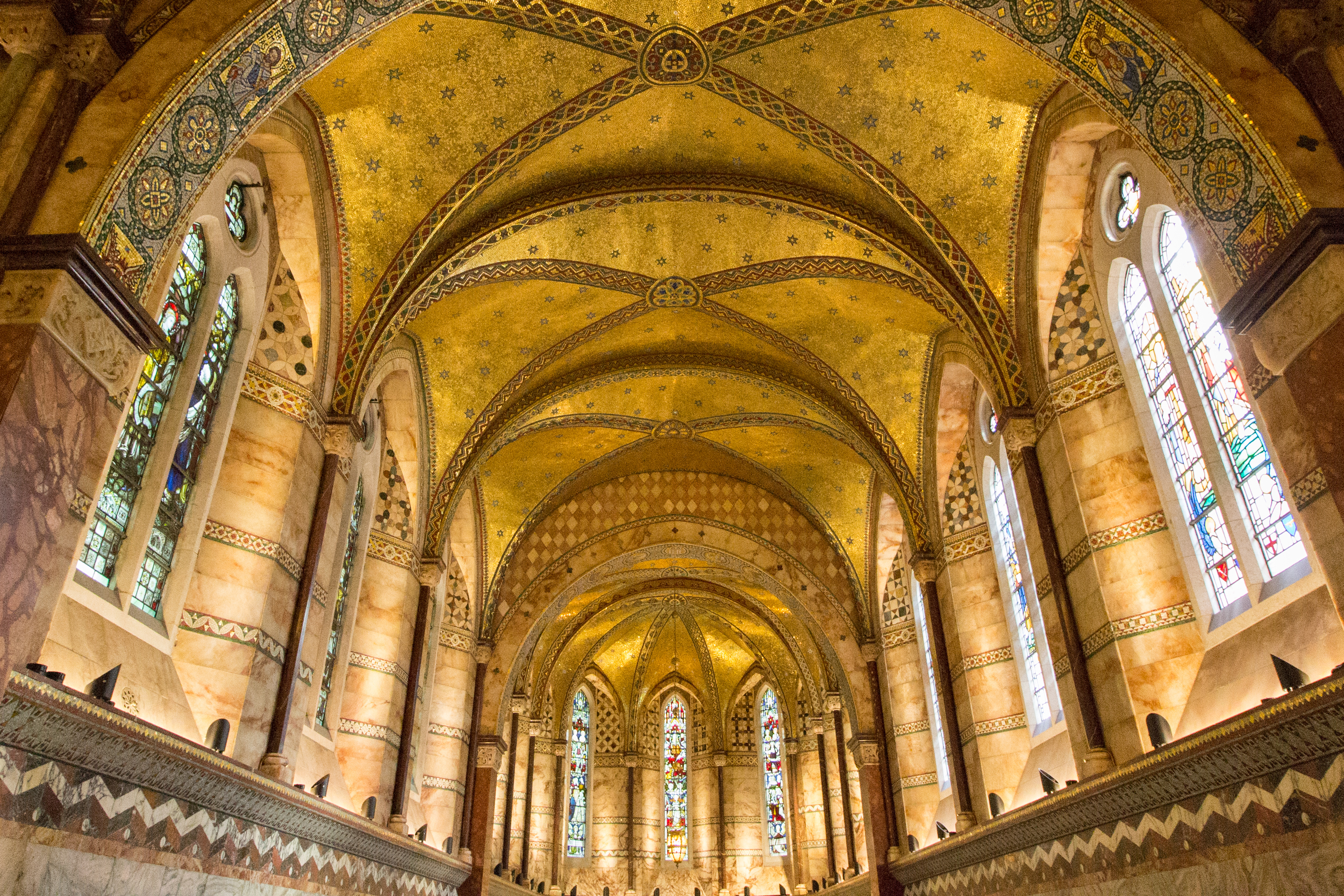
Ceiling of the restored chapel in September 2015

Built between 1891 and 1892, the former chapel of the Middlesex Hospital by John Loughborough Pearson is now the only surviving building of the hospital. The chapel was completed after the architect's death under the supervision of his son, Frank, also an architect. The chapel was structurally complete by the mid-1920s; the surrounding hospital was then demolished and rebuilt around it between 1928 and 1929. The chapel was not formally opened until 1929, by which time much of the lavish interior decoration of marbles and mosaic in a mix of Italian gothic and romanesque styles had been added, giving it the appearance it broadly retains today. The chapel is a Grade II* Listed building.

The fabric of the chapel was allowed to decline in the closing decades of the Middlesex Hospital, with water ingress through the roof causing substantial damage to the fabric of the building. The chapel fabric and interior was subject to a £2m restoration, and the building re-endowed with maintenance funds by Exemplar Properties. Never consecrated, named or dedicated, the chapel was given the name "Fitzrovia Chapel."

In 2024, the chapel served as the setting for the King’s Christmas message.

=== Paintings of Frederick Cayley Robinson ===
For nearly 100 years, four giant paintings welcomed visitors to the reception area of the Middlesex Hospital. The Acts of Mercy were painted in 1912 by Frederick Cayley Robinson, a distinctive yet elusive British artist, after being commissioned by Sir Edmund Davis, one of the governors of the hospital. Prior to the demolition of the hospital, the art was purchased by the Wellcome Library.

== Notable patients ==
People reported to have died there include:

- Dion Fortune, occultist and author (1946)
- Jane Carr, actress (1957)
- Hugh Gaitskell, leader of the Labour Party (1963)
- William Gerhardie, novelist and playwright (1977)
- Rudyard Kipling, journalist and novelist (1936)
- Peter Sellers, actor (1980)

People who have been treated here include:

- Jeffrey Bernard (1997)
- Winston Churchill (1955 and 1962)

== Notable staff ==
Notable staff have included:

- Charles Bell (1774–1842), lecturer
- Edward Hulme (1812–1876), apprentice of Charles Bell at Middlesex hospital. Surgeon and hospital administrator in New Zealand
- Dame Alicia LLoyd Still (4 November 1869 – 23 July 1944), matron 1909-1913. Matron of St.Thomas' Hospital, founding member of the College of Ltd (later the Royal College of Nursing) and elected member of the General Nursing Council.
- Eva Luckes (8 July 1854 – 16 February 1919) trained at The Middlesex Hospital for three months, probably as a paying probationer for three months from September 1876. She completed a years training as an ordinary probationer at The Westminster Hospital between August 1877 and August 1878. Luckes was Matron of The London Hospital from 1880 to 1919, and was an innovative and influential nursing leader and friend of Florence Nightingale.
- Dorothy Smith (1895–1991), matron from 1929 to 1946
- Godiva Miriam Thorold, matron from 1880 to 1905.
- Shirley Wray, neuro-ophthalmologist and Professor at Harvard Medical School

== See also ==
- List of demolished buildings and structures in London
- Central Middlesex Hospital
- North Middlesex Hospital
- West Middlesex Hospital
- John Raymond Hobbs
- List of hospitals in England
