= University College Hospital (disambiguation) =

University College Hospital is a teaching hospital in London, England.

University College Hospital may also refer to:

- University College London Hospitals NHS Foundation Trust, the NHS foundation trust which includes UCH
  - UCH Macmillan Cancer Centre
  - UCLH/UCL Biomedical Research Centre
  - University College Hospital at Westmoreland Street
  - University College Hospital Medical School
- University College Hospital Galway, hospital in Galway, Ireland
- University College Hospital, Ibadan, teaching hospital in Ibadan, Nigeria
