= University College London Hospitals NHS Foundation Trust =

NHS hospital trust

- Type: NHS foundation trust
- Established: 31 March 1994
- Headquarters: 250 Euston Road; London; NW1 2PG
- Hospitals: University College Hospital; Royal National Throat, Nose and Ear Hospital; Royal London Hospital for Integrated Medicine; National Hospital for Neurology and Neurosurgery; Eastman Dental Hospital; UCH Macmillan Cancer Centre; Hospital for Tropical Diseases; University College Hospital at Westmoreland Street
- Staff: 11,000 (2018/19)
- Website: www.uclh.nhs.uk

University College London Hospitals NHS Foundation Trust (UCLH) is an NHS foundation trust based in London, United Kingdom. It comprises University College Hospital, University College Hospital at Westmoreland Street, the UCH Macmillan Cancer Centre, the Royal National ENT and Eastman Dental Hospitals, the Hospital for Tropical Diseases, the National Hospital for Neurology and Neurosurgery, the Royal London Hospital for Integrated Medicine and the Royal National Throat, Nose and Ear Hospital.

The Trust has an annual turnover of around £1.6bn and employs approximately 11,000 staff. Each year its hospitals treat over 1,000,000 outpatients appointments and admit over 100,000 patients. In partnership with University College London, UCLH has major research activities as part of the UCLH/UCL Biomedical Research Centre and the UCL Partners academic health science centre. Its hospitals are also major teaching centres and offer training for nurses, doctors and other health care professionals in partnership with City, University of London, King's College London, London South Bank University and UCL Medical School.

== History ==
=== Origins ===
The hospitals which now form part of UCLH or which contributed to its development were all originally established as charities which relied on public donations and subscriptions for their income. The oldest of these was the Middlesex Hospital, which was founded in 1745 and was one of the five voluntary general hospitals which were established in London during the 18th century (the others being Westminster Hospital (1719), Guy's Hospital (1721), St George's Hospital (1733), and the Royal London Hospital (1740).

=== 20th century ===
In 1948 the National Health Service was established, making most hospitals in the UK directly controlled by the public sector and funded by public taxation. Hospitals were grouped together into regional hospital management committees or teaching hospital groups. Following major NHS reforms UCL Hospitals NHS Trust was established in 1994, comprising the Middlesex Hospital, the Elizabeth Garrett Anderson Hospital, the Hospital for Tropical Diseases and University College Hospital. In 1996 The Eastman Dental Hospital and the National Hospital for Neurology and Neurosurgery joined the UCLH NHS Trust.

=== 2000 to 2010 ===
In August 2001 the private Heart Hospital was acquired by UCLH and became the new home for all of the Trust's cardiac services, which had previously been housed in the Middlesex Hospital. In 2002 the Royal London Homeopathic Hospital joined UCLH and in July 2004 UCLH was one of the first NHS trusts to be granted foundation trust status.

In 2005 the new University College Hospital building was opened and all activities from the Middlesex Hospital were moved into the new building. The Middlesex Hospital was closed in December 2005 and the site sold to developers.

In November 2009 the University College Hospital Elizabeth Garrett Anderson Wing was opened and most activities from the Elizabeth Garrett Anderson Hospital were moved into the new building.

In April 2007 the Trust formed the UCLH/UCL National Institute for Health Research Comprehensive Biomedical Research Centre in partnership with UCL and the National Institute for Health and Care Research.

In August 2008 the Trust announced its intention to form the UCL Partners academic health science centre with UCL, Great Ormond Street Hospital for Children NHS Trust, Moorfields Eye Hospital NHS Foundation Trust and Royal Free Hampstead NHS Trust.

In February 2009 Professor Sir Cyril Chantler was appointed as the first Chair of UCL Partners and it was officially designated as an academic health science centre by the UK Department of Health in March 2009.

=== 2010 to present ===
In April 2012 it was announced that UCLH had been selected by the UK Government as one of two sites in England for the provision of Proton Beam Therapy (PBT) (the other being the Christie Hospital in Manchester). In 2015 the Trust began construction of a new clinical facility adjacent to University College Hospital to house the PBT facilities, and to also contain Europe’s largest haematological inpatient service and a short stay surgical centre. The facility is planned to open in 2019.

The Trust opened the UCH Macmillan Cancer Centre in April 2012.

In 2013 the Institute of Sport, Exercise and Health was opened on Tottenham Court Road; the Institute is a partnership between the Trust, UCL, the British Olympic Association, the English Institute of Sport, and the HCA private hospital group.

In 2015, UCLH completed the transfer of cardiac services to Barts Health NHS Trust, with services moving to the new purpose built Bart's Heart Center. The Heart Hospital was renamed University College Hospital at Westmoreland Street and refurbished to provide thoracic and urology services including operation theaters, lithotripsy and cystoscopy.

In August 2016 a partnership between the trust and Google's artificial intelligence division, DeepMind, was announced, as part of which anonymised CT and MRI scans from former University College Hospital radiotherapy patients will be utilised to help develop an algorithm that can automatically differentiate between healthy and cancerous tissues.

In October 2019 services from the Eastman Dental Hospital and the Royal National Throat Nose and Ear Hospital moved to a new facility, the Royal National ENT and Eastman Dental Hospitals on Huntley Street, WC1E 6DG. The Eastman Dental Hospital site closed to patients. The Royal National Throat Nose and Ear Hospital on Gray's Inn Road remains open for wards, theatres, sleep diagnostics and allergy day case services.

The trust was rated 'worse than expected' over care for women giving birth.

== Hospitals ==
=== Current ===
==== University College Hospital ====
University College Hospital (UCH) is a major teaching hospital located on Euston Road in the Fitzrovia area of the London Borough of Camden, adjacent to the main campus of UCL. The hospital has 665 in-patient beds, 12 operating theatres and houses the largest single critical care unit in the NHS. It is a major teaching hospital and a key location for the UCL Medical School.

==== University College Hospital at Westmoreland Street ====
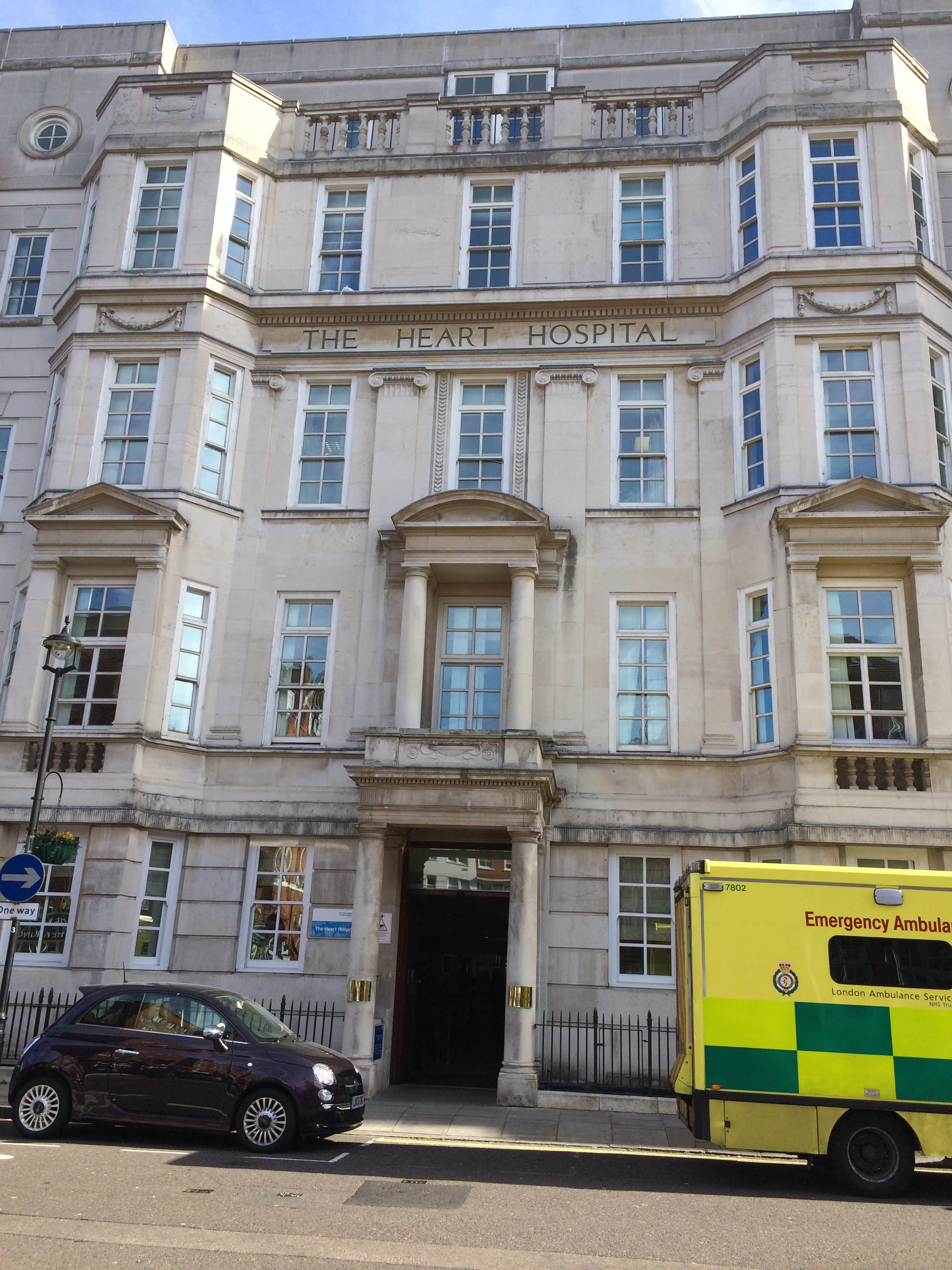
University College Hospital at Westmoreland Street

University College Hospital at Westmoreland Street is a hospital which provides thoracic surgery and urology services. Prior to 2015 the hospital was a specialist cardiology hospital; all cardiac services moved to one site at St Bartholomew’s Hospital following agreement by UCLH and Barts Health NHS Trust to combine their specialist cardiovascular services at the one site.

==== UCH Macmillan Cancer Centre ====
UCH Macmillan Cancer Centre is a specialist cancer hospital located adjacent to University College Hospital. The Centre opened in April 2012, with significant support from the UCL Hospitals Charitable Foundation.

==== Eastman Dental Hospital ====
The Eastman Dental Hospital is a specialist hospital for dental treatment located on Gray's Inn Road in the Bloomsbury area of Central London. In partnership with the UCL Eastman Dental Institute, which occupies the same site, the hospital is a major centre for dental research and the largest provider of postgraduate teaching and training in dentistry in Europe.

==== Hospital for Tropical Diseases ====
The Hospital for Tropical Diseases is a specialist tropical disease hospital located in central London. It is the only NHS hospital dedicated to the prevention, diagnosis and treatment of tropical diseases and travel-related infections. In addition to specialists in major tropical diseases such as Malaria, Leprosy and tuberculosis. It also provides an infectious disease treatment service.

==== National Hospital for Neurology and Neurosurgery ====
The National Hospital for Neurology and Neurosurgery is a neurological hospital located on Queen Square in Bloomsbury. It was the first hospital to be established in England dedicated exclusively to treating the diseases of the nervous system. In partnership with the UCL Institute of Neurology, which occupies the same site, the hospital is a major centre for neuroscience research. It supports the Sir William Gowers Epilepsy Assessment Unit at the National Society for Epilepsy Centre at Chalfont St Peter, Buckinghamshire. The NHNN also runs The National Brain Appeal, a charity dedicated to supporting the Hospital for the funding of equipment, buildings and research.

==== Royal London Hospital for Integrated Medicine ====
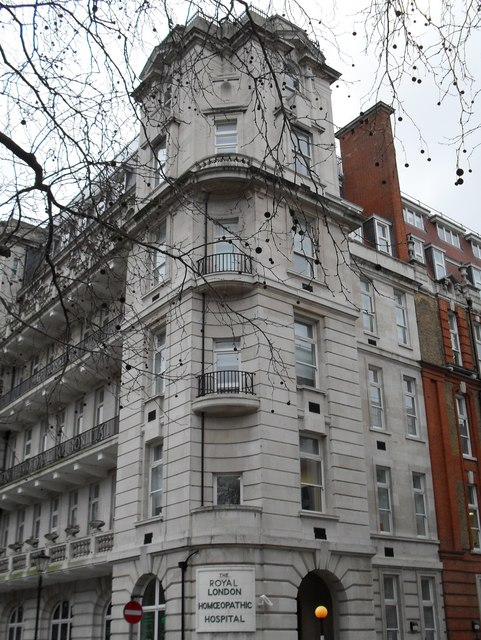
The Royal London Hospital for Integrated Medicine

The Royal London Hospital for Integrated Medicine is a specialist alternative medicine hospital located in Bloomsbury, adjacent to Great Ormond Street Hospital. It is the largest public sector provider of complementary medicine in Europe.

The Royal London Hospital for Integrated Medicine offers clinical services including complementary cancer treatments, allergy services, acupuncture, homeopathy, rheumatology, weight loss management, sleep management, musculoskeletal medicine and stress management, and has access to conventional medicine. It has an education department which offers full and part-time courses in complementary medicine for registered health professionals. It is also home to a specialist library for complementary and alternative medicine.

==== Royal National Throat, Nose and Ear Hospital ====
The Royal National Throat, Nose and Ear Hospital is a specialist otolaryngologic hospital located on the Gray's Inn Road in Bloomsbury. The hospital specialises in the diagnosis and treatment of ear, nose and throat disorders. Departments within the hospital include an allergy clinic, rhinology and audiology/otology, and it treats a range of disorders including cancers, hearing and speech disorders, snoring and related sleep disorders.

=== Former ===
==== Elizabeth Garrett Anderson and Obstetric Hospital ====
The Elizabeth Garrett Anderson and Obstetric Hospital was a maternity and neonatal services hospital in Bloomsbury. The hospital was closed in November 2008 when its services moved to the newly constructed University College Hospital Elizabeth Garrett Anderson Wing.

==== Middlesex Hospital ====
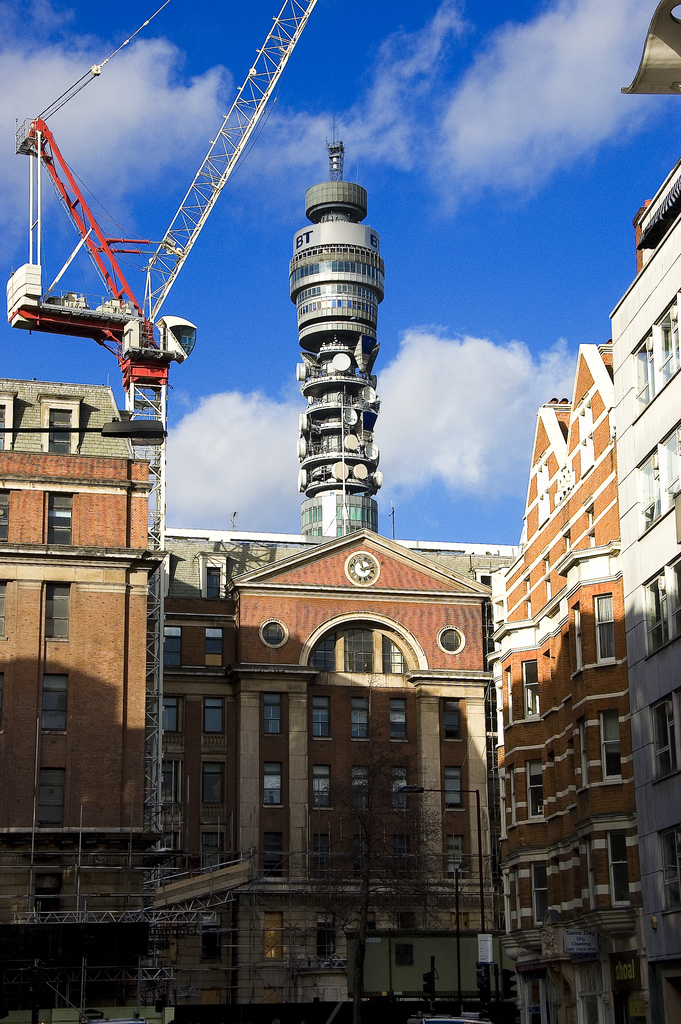
The Middlesex Hospital shortly before its demolition

The Middlesex Hospital was a teaching hospital located in the Fitzrovia area of central London. The hospital was opened by surgeon Charles Bell in 1745 on Windmill Street and moved to Mortimer Street in 1757. The hospital was closed in 2005 when its staff and services were transferred to various sites within UCLH. The Middlesex Hospital Medical School, with a history dating back to 1746, merged with the medical school of UCL in 1987.

== Organisation ==
UCLH has a Board of Directors and Chief Executive (currently David Probert) of the Trust. The role of the Board is to:

- set the overall policy and strategic direction for the Trust;
- approve and monitor the Trust's business plans, budgets and major capital expenditure;
- monitor performance against objectives; and
- provide members of the Trust's committees such as the remuneration committee and audit committee.

UCLH also has a Governing Body which helps the Trust to develop and shape its services, to improve communication between the Trust's members, patients and local communities, and influences Trust decisions. The Governing Body is composed of 33 governors, 23 of whom are elected by the Trust's patient, public and staff members, of whom three represent the local public, 14 represent patients and six represent Trust staff. 10 other governors are appointed by local partner organisations including the primary care trust and UCL. Elections to the Governing Body are held each year.

== Research ==
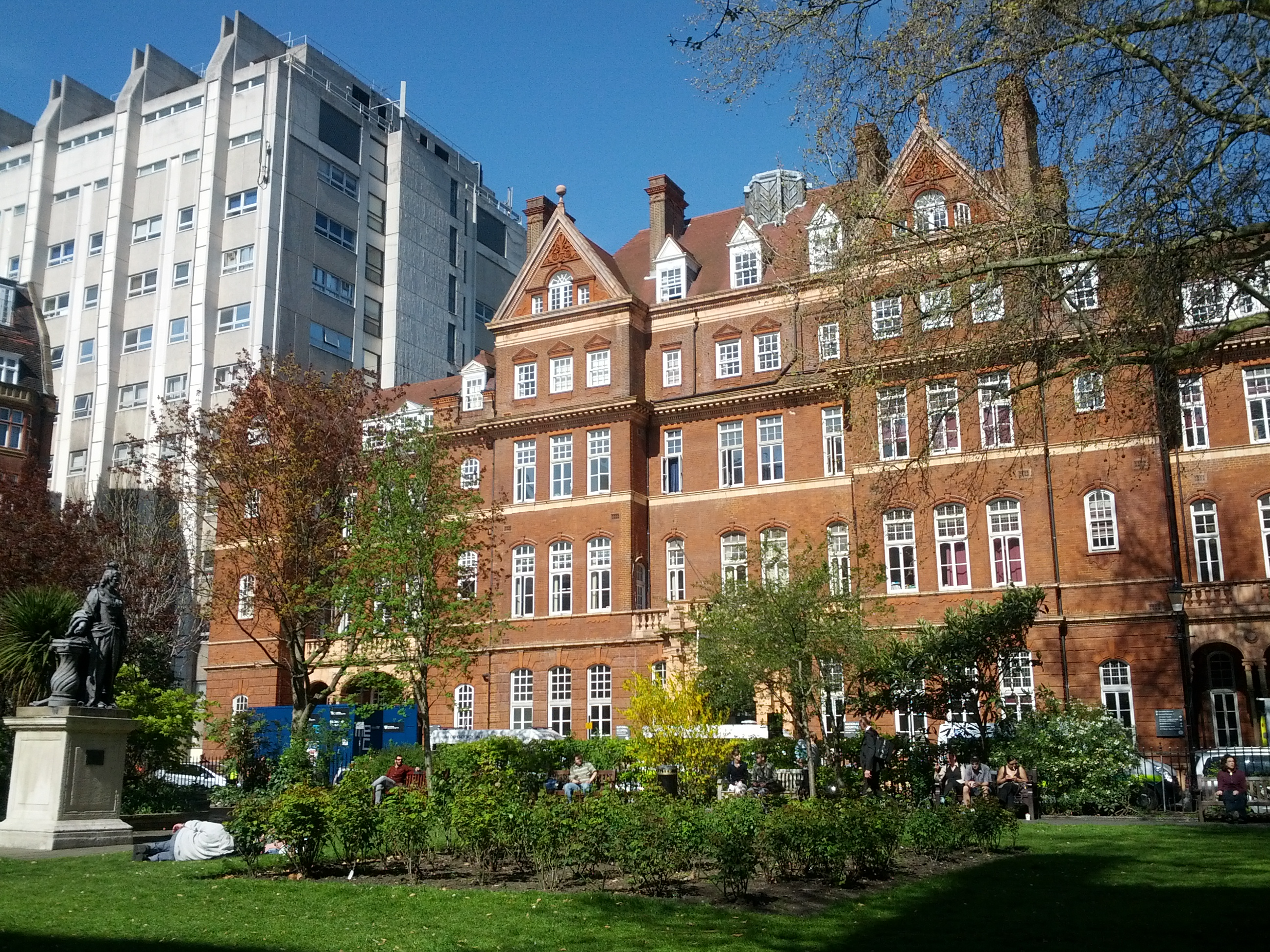
The National Hospital for Neurology and Neurosurgery with the UCL Institute of Neurology adjacent

In partnership with UCL, UCLH has major research activities and they are partners in the UCLH/UCL Biomedical Research Centre. In September 2016 the Centre was awarded £111 million in funding from the National Institute for Health and Care Research for the five years from April 2017.

UCLH is a founding member of UCL Partners, the largest academic health science partnership in Europe; other members include UCL, Barts Health NHS Trust, Great Ormond Street Hospital for Children NHS Foundation Trust, Moorfields Eye Hospital NHS Foundation Trust and the Royal Free Hampstead NHS Trust.

Each of the UCLH hospitals has close research links with the UCL School of Life & Medical Sciences and its institutes and centres. The Eastman Dental Hospital is closely associated with the UCL Eastman Dental Institute, which occupies the same site. The National Hospital for Neurology and Neurosurgery is closely allied with the UCL Institute of Neurology, both are based in Queen Square and together they form a major centre for research in neurology and allied clinical and basic neurosciences. The Royal National Throat, Nose and Ear Hospital and the UCL Ear Institute are located adjacent to each other on Gray's Inn Road and together form the largest centre for audiological research in Europe.

== Teaching ==
UCL Medical School provides core medical education at three UCLH hospitals - University College Hospital, the National Hospital for Neurology and Neurosurgery and University College Hospital at Westmoreland Street. UCLH also has close training and education links for nursing, midwifery and other allied health professionals with City University London, London South Bank University and King's College London.

== Performance ==
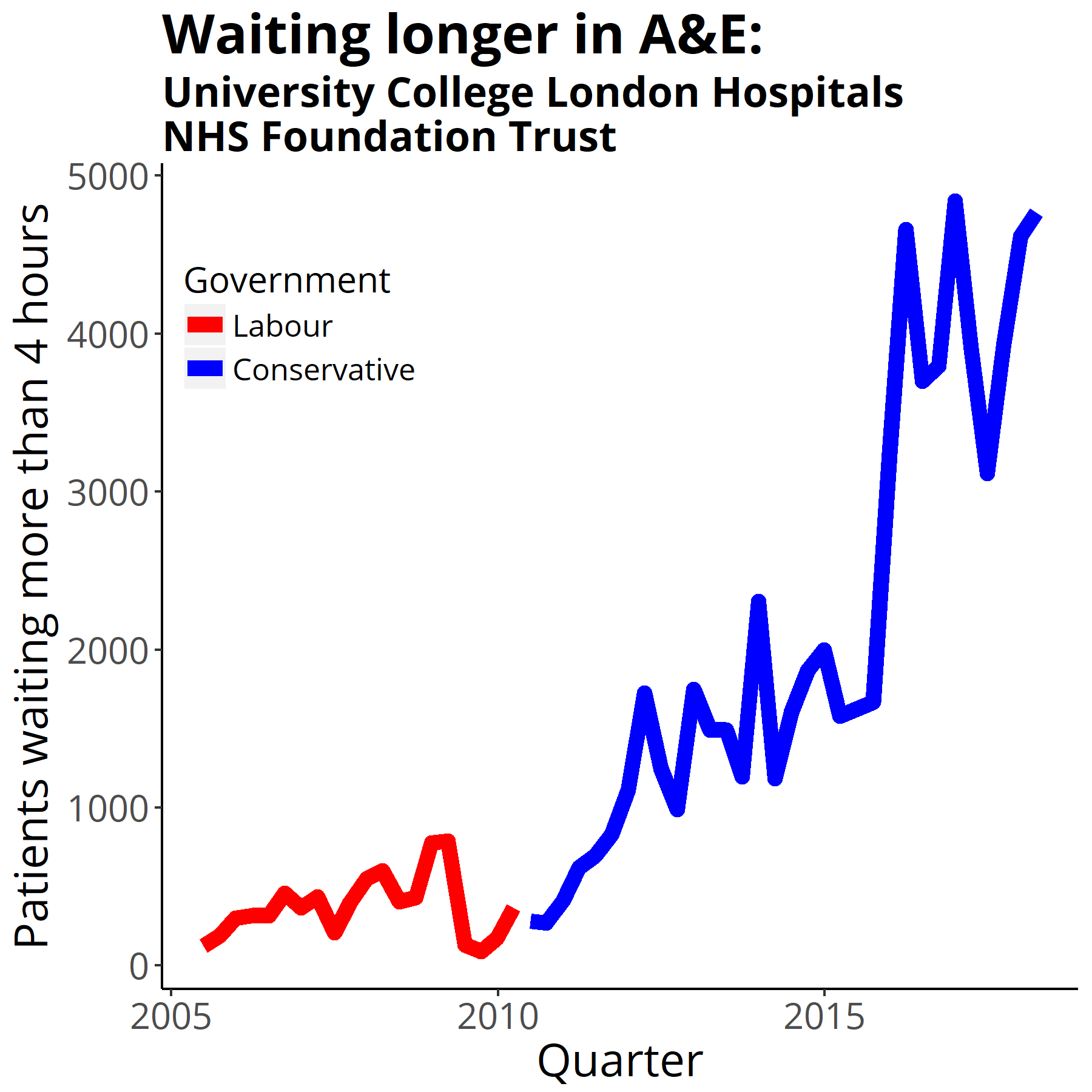
Four-hour target in the emergency department quarterly figures from NHS England Data from https://www.england.nhs.uk/statistics/statistical-work-areas/ae-waiting-times-and-activity/

The trust entered into a £292 million Private Finance Initiative scheme in 2000 for which it pays £55 million a year. The original developer, Amec Foster Wheeler sold their 35% stake to Land Securities and their interest passed to Semperian in 2010. The other interests are held by Interserve and Credit Suisse. The PFI holding company made a profit of £19 million in 2014/5.

The trust expected to finish 2015-16 with a deficit of more than £22 million as a result of changes to the NHS tariff. In February 2016 it was expecting a deficit of £32.5 million for the year 2015/6.

The trust complained in June 2015 that commissioners outside England use a "burdensome" prior approval process, where a funding agreement is needed before each stage of treatment. At the end of 2014-15 the trust was owed more than £2.3m for treating patients from outside England.

It was named by the Health Service Journal as one of the top hundred NHS trusts to work for in 2015. At that time it had 7657 full-time equivalent staff and a sickness absence rate of 3.38%. 83% of staff recommend it as a place for treatment and 70% recommended it as a place to work.

In 2020 it signed a hard facilities management contract with CBRE Group, worth £85 million over five years and a soft facilities management contract with Medirest also for five years, for £151 million. These do not include the University College Hospital building on Euston Road, which is managed as part of the trust’s PFI deal or the trust headquarters.
