= University College Hospital =

- University College London Hospitals NHS Foundation Trust
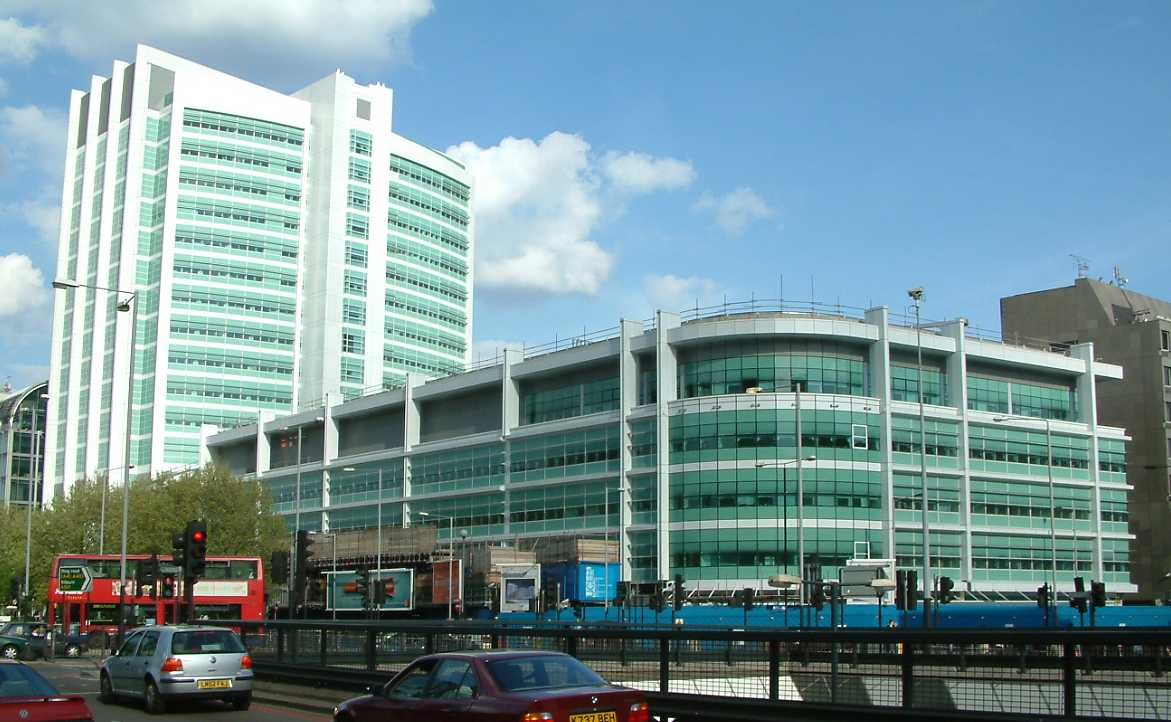
- Hospital building, opened 2005

- Shown in Camden

Geography
- Location: Bloomsbury, London, England
- Coordinates: 51°31′30.23″N 00°08′10.41″W

Organisation
- Care system: National Health Service
- Type: Teaching
- Affiliated university: University College London

Services
- Emergency department: Yes
- Beds: 665

History
- Founded: 1834; 192 years ago

Links
- Website: uclh.nhs.uk
- Lists: Hospitals in England

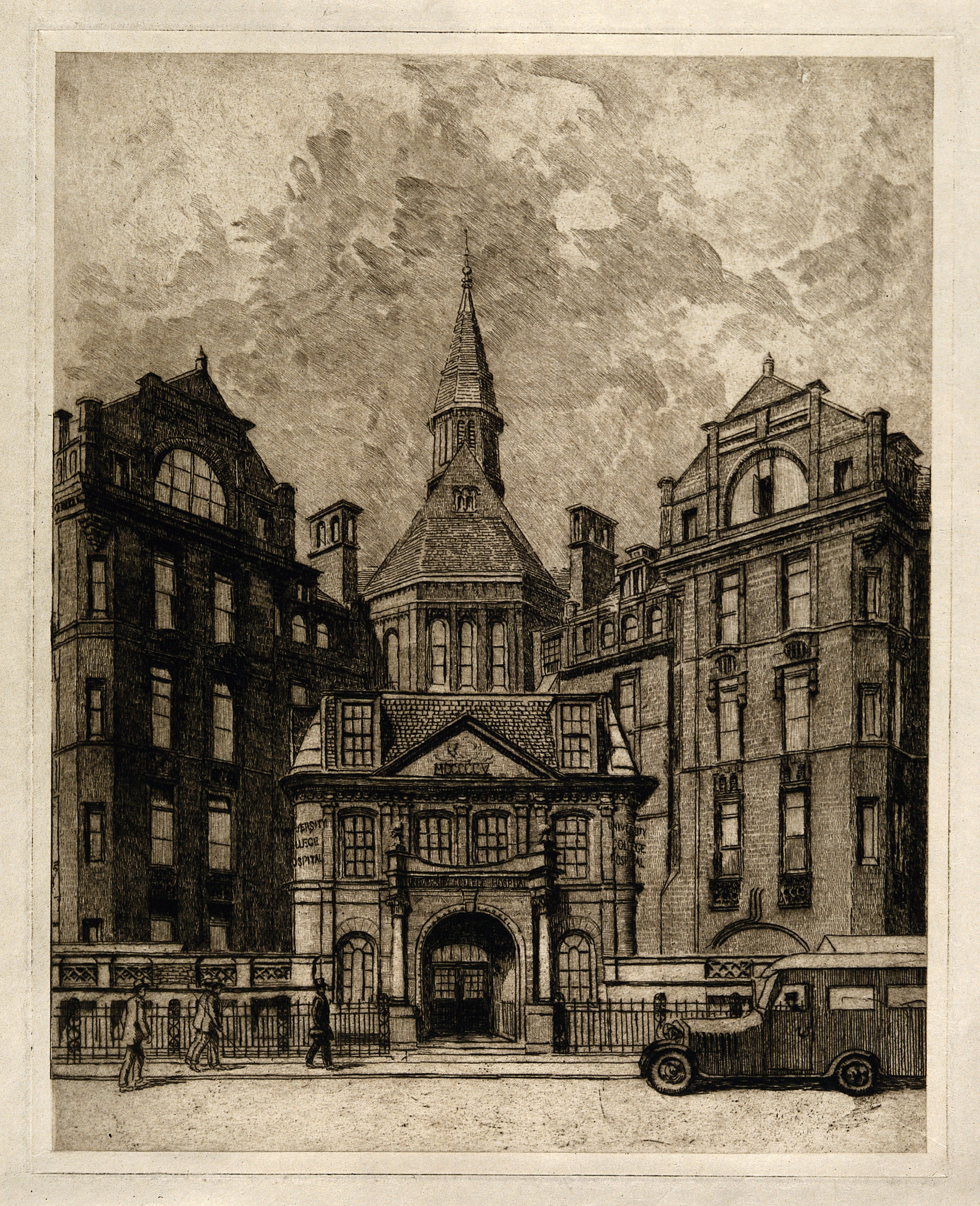
Paul Waterhouse's etching of the Cruciform Building on Gower Street

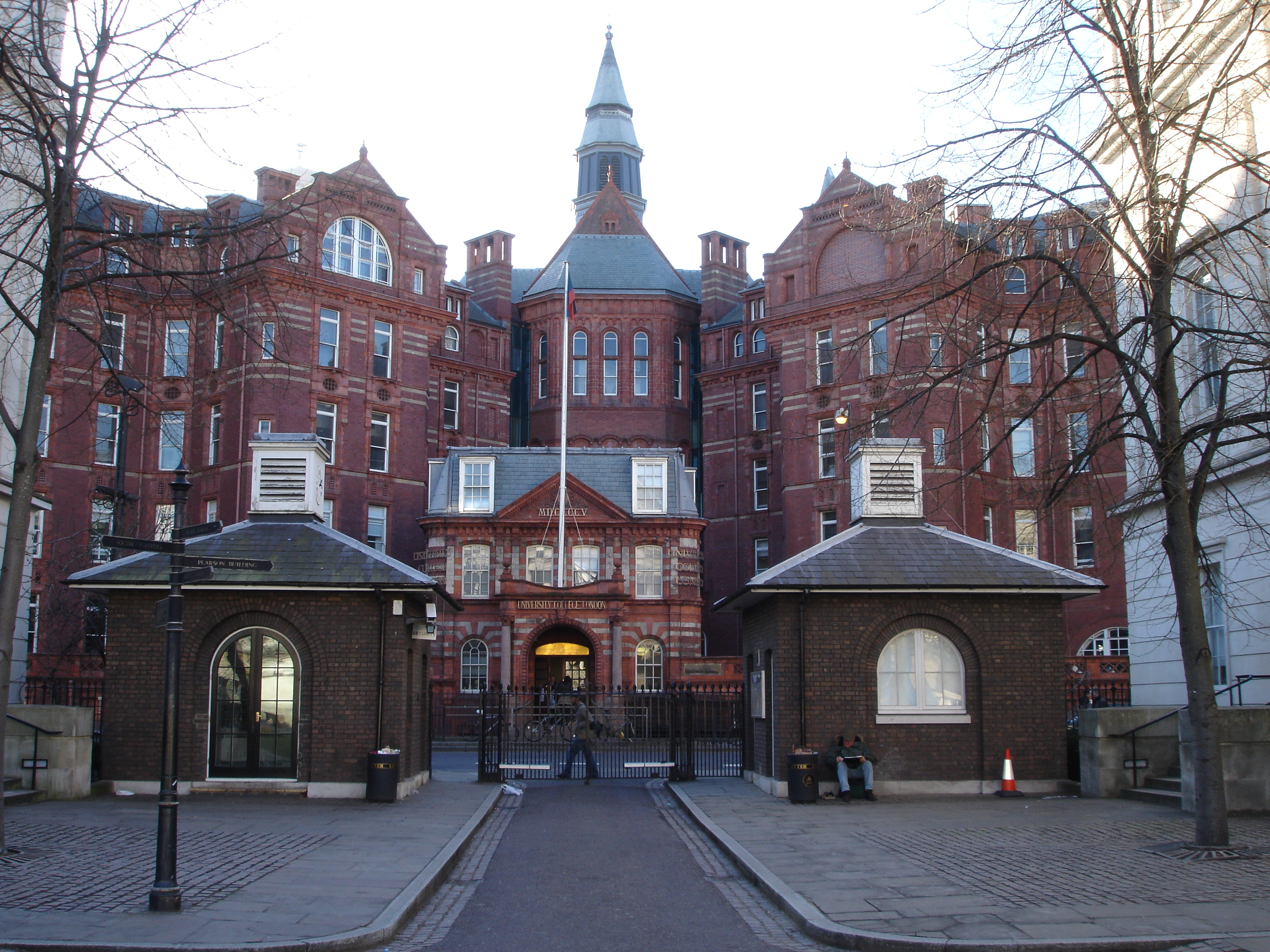
The Cruciform Building on Gower Street in 2007

University College Hospital (UCH) is a teaching hospital in the Bloomsbury area of the London Borough of Camden, England. The hospital, which was founded as the North London Hospital in 1834, is closely associated with University College London (UCL), whose main campus is situated next door. The hospital is part of the University College London Hospitals NHS Foundation Trust.

The hospital is on the south side of Euston Road and its tower faces Euston Square tube station on the east side. Warren Street tube station lies immediately west and the major Euston terminus station is beyond 200 metres east, just beyond Euston Square Gardens.

== History ==
In 1826, the London University began emphasising the importance of having medical schools attached to hospitals. Before the hospital opened, only Oxford and Cambridge universities offered medical degrees, and as a consequence relatively few doctors actually had degrees. It was founded as the North London Hospital in 1834 in order to provide clinical training for the "medical classes" of the university, after a refusal by the governors of the Middlesex Hospital to allow students access to that hospital's wards. It soon became known as University College Hospital.

In 1835, Robert Liston became the first professor of clinical surgery at UCH, and the first major operation under ether in Europe was conducted at the hospital by Liston on 21 December 1846. UCH was split from UCL in 1905, and a new hospital building designed by Alfred Waterhouse, known as the Cruciform Building, was opened in 1906 on Gower Street. UCH merged with the National Dental Hospital in 1914, and the Royal Ear Hospital in 1920.

George Orwell married Sonia Brownell in 1949, and died on 21 January 1950, in room 65 of the hospital. The hospital was run by the Camden and Islington Area Health Authority from 1974. In 1994, UCH became part of the University College London Hospitals NHS Trust. The hospital site at the Cruciform Building was closed in 1995, despite strikes and an occupation in 1993. The building was purchased by UCL, for use as the home for the Wolfson Institute for Biomedical Research and the teaching facility for UCL bioscience and medical students UCL Medical School.

A new 75,822 m^{2} hospital, procured under the Private Finance Initiative in 2000, designed by Llewelyn Davies Yeang and built by a joint venture of AMEC and Balfour Beatty at a cost of £422 million, opened in 2005. The sculpture Monolith and Shadow made from a large polished piece of Brazilian granite was placed outside the main entrance to the new hospital in 2005.

In October 2006, the hospital was nominated and made the Building Design shortlist for the inaugural Carbuncle Cup, awarded to "the ugliest building in the United Kingdom completed in the last 12 months", which was ultimately awarded to Drake Circus Shopping Centre in Plymouth. Facilities management services are provided by Interserve.

In November 2008, the £70 million Elizabeth Garrett Anderson Wing was opened, allowing the hospital to offer all women's health services in one place (except some breast and gynaecology services).

In 2024, King Charles III became patron of the hospital, a role Queen Elizabeth II had filled until her death in 2022.

== Services ==
As of 2015 the following services were provided at the hospital:

- Accident and emergency
- Cancer care (see UCH Macmillan Cancer Centre)
- Clinical haematology including stem cell transplantation
- Critical care
- Dermatology
- Endocrinology
- General medicine
- General neurology
- General surgery
- Gynaecology
- Ophthalmology
- Orthopaedics
- Paediatrics and adolescents
- Rheumatology

The hospital has 665 in-patient beds, 12 operating theatres and houses the largest single critical care unit in the NHS. The Accident and Emergency department sees approximately 120,000 patients a year. It is a major teaching hospital and a key location for the UCL Medical School. It is also a major centre for medical research and part of both the UCLH/UCL Biomedical Research Centre and the UCL Partners academic health science centre.

The urology department moved to University College Hospital at Westmoreland Street, formerly the Heart Hospital, in 2015.

== Notable staff ==
- Marcus Beck, surgeon (appointed 1863) and professor of Surgery (1883–1893)
- Ernst Chain, Nobel Prize winner
- Agatha Christie, worked in the pharmacy during World War II
- Dora Finch, RRC, matron (1901–1922), founder of the UCH League of Nurses
- Graham Fraser, consultant and pioneer of cochlear implants in the UK
- Jacqueline Flindall FRCN (1932–2023), leader, educator and commentator on nursing issues.
- Harold Lambert, medical doctor and professor of medicine, known for his work dealing with infectious diseases and antibiotic therapy
- Sir Thomas Lewis, cardiologist at the hospital
- Jean Smellie, consultant paediatrician (1970–1993)
- Elizabeth Joan Stokes, medical registrar (1937–40), clinical bacteriologist (1944–77)
- Gladys Taylor DBE, RRC, nurse (1916–19), later matron-in-chief, Princess Mary's Royal Air Force Nurisng Service (1943–48)
- Chris Whitty, infectious diseases consultant and chief medical officer for England

== See also ==
- Francis Crick Institute
- UCL Medical School
- University College London Hospitals NHS Foundation Trust
- Healthcare in London
- List of hospitals in England
- Murder of Alexander Litvinenko (having been transferred here, he died here in November 2006, as a result of polonium-210 poisoning)

== Sources ==
- Merrington, William, (1976) University College Hospital and its Medical School: a history, Heinemann ISBN 9780434465002
