= Royal London Hospital for Integrated Medicine =

Alternative medicine hospital in London

- University College London Hospitals NHS Foundation Trust
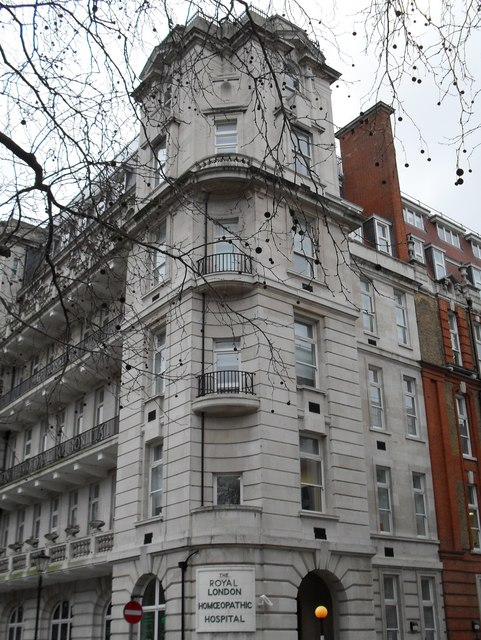
- Royal London Homoeopathic Hospital in Great Ormond Street in 2009

- Shown in Westminster

Geography
- Location: London, WC1, United Kingdom
- Coordinates: 51.5217°N 0.1215°W

Organisation
- Care system: NHS
- Affiliated university: University College London

Services
- Beds: None

Links
- Website: University College London Hospitals NHS Foundation Trust

The Royal London Hospital for Integrated Medicine (formerly the Royal London Homoeopathic Hospital) is a specialist alternative medicine hospital located in London, England and a part of University College London Hospitals NHS Foundation Trust. It is the largest public sector provider of complementary medicine in Europe. It is based in the Bloomsbury area of Central London, adjacent to Great Ormond Street Hospital.

== History ==
The London Homoeopathic Hospital was established in Golden Square, Soho, in 1849. Frederic Hervey Foster Quin, the first homeopathic physician in England, had been instrumental in the founding of the hospital. It moved to its present site in Great Ormond Street in 1859, the year when Quin took the chair of therapeutics and materia medica in the medical school. The hospital joined the NHS as a teaching hospital becoming the Royal London Homeopathic Hospital by permission of King George VI in 1948. It was brought under the management of the Bloomsbury Health Authority in 1982 and it joined University College London Hospitals NHS Trust (now University College London Hospitals NHS Foundation Trust) in 2002. The hospital was renamed the Royal London Hospital for Integrated Medicine in September 2010 to better reflect its activities.

It stopped providing NHS-funded homeopathic remedies in April 2018.

In 2024, King Charles III became patron of the hospital, a role Queen Elizabeth II had filled until her death in 2022.

== Notable staff ==
- Marion Brew (also known as Maryanne or Minna) (1834/1836 -1913), was Matron of the London Homeopathic Hospital for 31 years, from 1875-1906. Brew was born in Ennis, County Clare, Ireland in approximately 1833-36. She trained at the Royal Southern Hospital Liverpool. Whilst she was matron at the homeopathic, the hospital doubled in size from 50 to 100 beds and the training was considered of 'the highest order'. When Brew retired aged 73, she had been ill with bronchitis for sometime. In 1911 Brew was a patient in Bramblewood, High Kelling, Norfolk. In 1924 a TB hospital, Bramblewood was opened in the same area for people with tuberculosis. She was buried 2 June 1913 in St Mary's Churchyard, Kelling.

== Services ==
The Royal London Hospital for Integrated Medicine offers clinical services including complementary cancer treatments, allergy services, acupuncture, rheumatology, weight loss management, sleep management, musculoskeletal medicine, and stress management. It has an education department which offers full and part-time courses in complementary medicine for registered health professionals. It is also home to a specialist library for complementary and alternative medicine.

== See also ==
- UCLH/UCL Biomedical Research Centre
- UCL Partners
- Healthcare in London
- List of NHS trusts
