= James Goolnik =

James Goolnik is the clinical director and founder of Optimal Dental Health in London.

== Education ==
Goolnik studied at King's College London, qualifying in 1992. He worked for a year as a house office at King & St Georges before working in various NHS and mixed practices. Goolnik then studied for an MSc in Conservative Dentistry at the Eastman Dental Hospital under Derrick Setchel, qualifying in 1999.

== Career ==
Beginning in 1999, Goolnik worked as an associate until 2001 when he established Bow Lane Dental Group. He was named the UK's most influential dentist in 2011 and 2012 by Dentistry magazine. He was voted in top 50 dental people in 2024 by Dentistry magazine. He was named head judge in the Private Dentistry Awards in 2025.

In 2001, Goolnik introduced DVD glasses into his practice as a way of calming his patients down and providing dental care for them. In 2004, Goolnik was voted onto the board of directors of the British Academy of Cosmetic Dentistry (BACD) and became the president in 2008. In 2021 he was given the freedom for the City of London for services to Dentistry.

Goolnik is a dentist and clinical director and founder of the Optimal Dental Health in London.

He was the past dental advisor for Arm & Hammer in the UK. His career was written as a cover story in the Business of Dentistry magazine in summer 2012.
