= UCL Eastman Dental Institute =

Dental school of University College London

Coordinates: 51.525858°N 0.117089°W

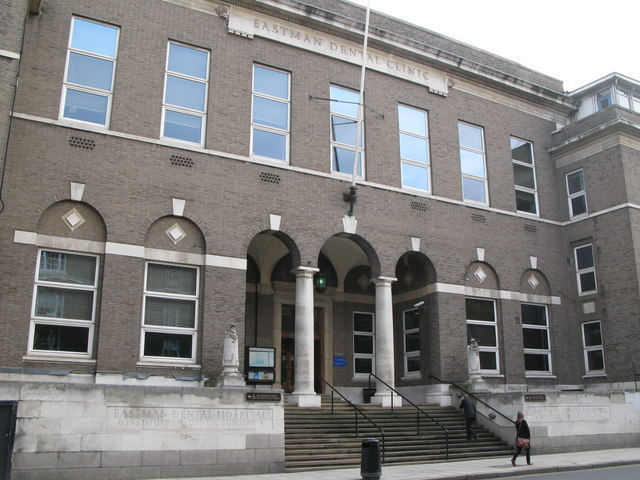
- Established: 1931 (opening of Eastman Dental Clinic); 1948 (as Postgraduate Dental Institute); 1999 (merger with UCL)
- Director: Professor Stephen Porter
- Location: London, United Kingdom
- Website: UCL Eastman Dental Institute

The UCL Eastman Dental Institute is the dental school of University College London (UCL) and an academic department of UCL's Faculty of Medical Sciences. The institute is based on Gray's Inn Road in the Bloomsbury district of London, United Kingdom, adjacent to the Eastman Dental Hospital, with which it is closely associated.

The institute is the largest postgraduate dental centre in Europe, and together with the Eastman Dental Hospital forms one of the largest concentrations of oral health care specialists and research in Europe. The institute runs an extensive CPD programme in dedicated facilities.

== History ==
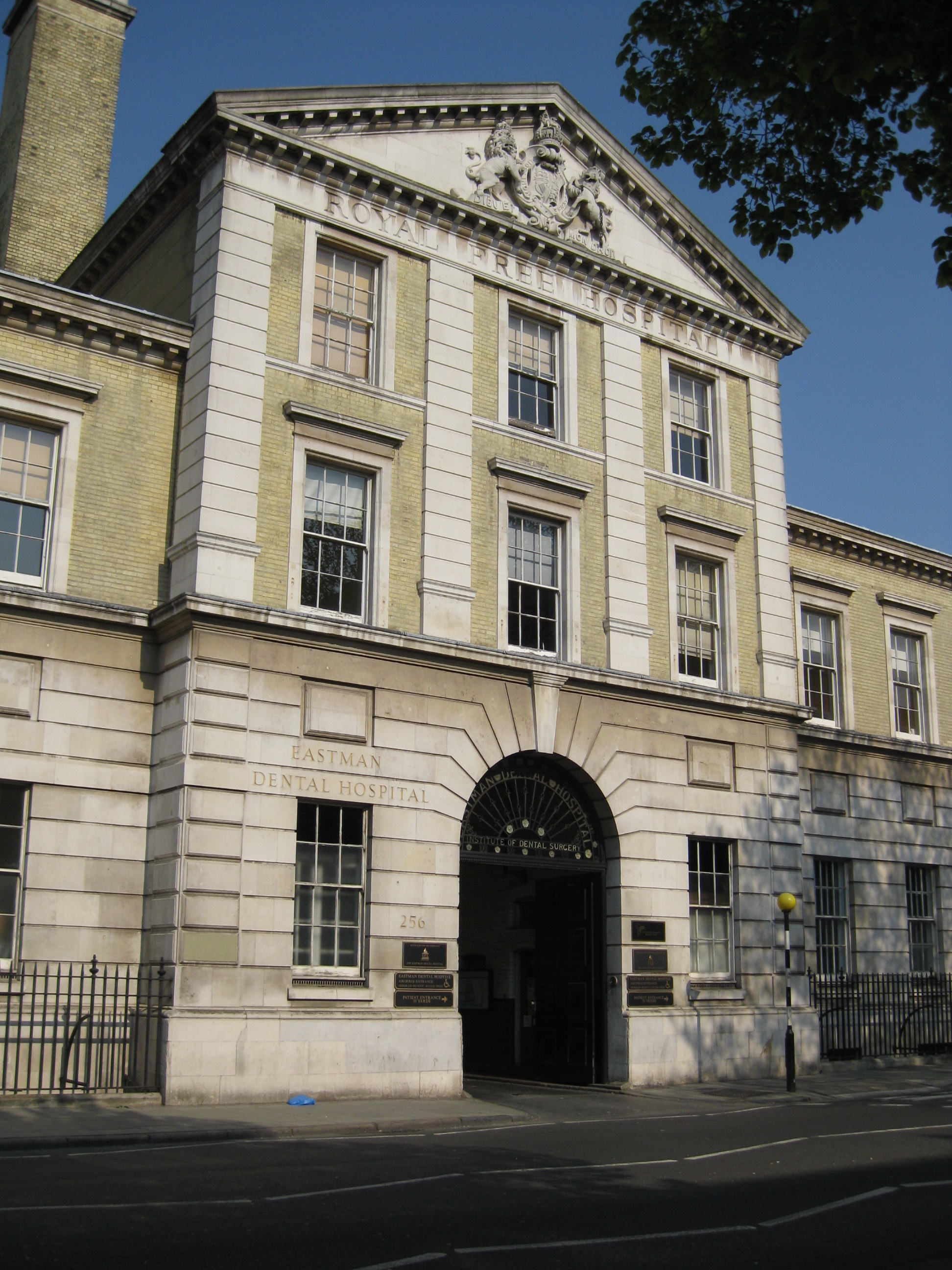
Eastman Dental Hospital (old Royal Free building)

In 1926 the American industrialist and philanthropist George Eastman, founder of Eastman Kodak, donated £200,000 to fund the establishment of a dental clinic in London. (He had also founded similar institutions in the United States.) Lord Riddell, chairman of the Royal Free Hospital, had solicited Eastman after having made his own donation of £50,000, with a matching donation by the Royal Free honorary treasurer. On 20 November 1931, the Eastman Dental Clinic opened as part of the Royal Free Hospital.

In 1948, the Eastman became independent of the Royal Free and became the postgraduate dental institute of the Postgraduate Medical Federation. In 1949 the Eastman opened a department of pathology and microbiology and the first civilian oral hygiene school in the UK.

During the directorship of Professor Frank Wilson (1950–1959) a full department range was established at the Eastman, including children's, oral surgery, radiography and prosthetics. Under the directorship of Sir Robert Bradlaw (1959–1970), the Eastman's teaching concept was altered, with MSc courses of the University of London being introduced. Professors Ivor Kramer, Gerry Winter and Crispian Scully CBE followed and brought the Research Assessment and the teaching assessment scores to a high level. In 1988 the Eastman moved to the old Royal Free buildings on Gray's Inn Road; in 1992 the Eastman's name was changed to the Eastman Dental Institute (EDI).

The institute merged with University College London in 1999, becoming the UCL Eastman Dental Institute. In 2002 it won the Queens Award for Higher Education.

== Research ==
The institute is a major research centre offering a range of doctorates. Much of the research is focused upon preventing, diagnosing and treating common oral disorders such as childhood dental decay, gum disease in adults or oral cancer.

Postgraduates and staff are also engaged in research designed to have a wider impact on collective public health, such as antibiotic resistance, bone repair and food poisoning.

Research at the institute is currently represented by three interdisciplinary departments:

=== Biomaterials & Tissue Engineering Department ===
The Biomaterials & Tissue Engineering Department carries out research to develop materials for hard and soft tissue reconstruction, but also with a need to understand the processes involved with cellular interaction with the materials surface.

=== Clinical Research Department ===
The Clinical Research Department focuses on the full spectrum of disorders of the head and neck region including disease of the oral mucosa, dentition, jawbones, salivary glands, cranial nerves, masticatory muscles and adjacent structures and organs. This Department also includes:

- Eastman Clinical Investigation Centre
- UCL Eastman Biobank
- International Centre for Evidence-Based Oral Health
- Centre for Oral Health in Performance

=== Microbial Diseases Department ===
The Microbial Diseases Department examines the aetiology, pathogenesis and control of diseases caused by micro-organisms as well as the ecology of the indigenous microbiota and its contribution to health. The department also oversees the Swab and Send project and the Tn Registry, the latter designating Tn numbers to researchers publishing details of new transposable elements discovered in bacteria and archaea.

== The Centre for Oral Health and Performance ==
The Centre for Oral Health and Performance promotes oral health in sport to enhance the performance, overall health and wellbeing of athletes. The centre engages in research with a wide range of clinical and academic disciplines as well as elite athletes, sport and exercise medicine professionals, sport organisations, sport funders, policy makers and industry.

The centre carried out research at the London 2012 Olympic Games, finding high levels of oral and dental disease and self-reported impact of oral health on performance in a fifth of athletes. The results were published in the British Journal of Sports Medicine.

A subsequent paper published in 2015 reported on a large study within Premier League and Championship football in 2014 of nearly 200 senior squad players from eight clubs. The study, which was highly reported, found that the oral health of players was poor and impacted on well-being and performance. Of players examined 37% had active dental decay, 53% dental erosion and 5% moderate to severe and irreversible gum disease.

== The Swab and Send project ==
Dr Adam Roberts, Senior Lecturer in Microbial Diseases at UCL Eastman Dental Institute, first launched crowdfunding project Swab and Send in 2012 to search for new antibiotics with the help of the public. For a small fee contributors are sent a swab kit enabling them to take a sample from any place in their environment where different bacteria may be competing for space and food. Once the swab is sent in the institute team analyses the samples to determine if there are any bacteria present producing potentially new antibiotics.

Dr Roberts received The Society for General Microbiology’s 2015 Outreach Prize in recognition of sustained activities to engage and inspire public interest in microbiology. He was also appointed an advisor to the Longitude Prize, a challenge with a £10 million fund to help solve the problem of global antibiotic resistance.

In December 2015 his team assisted BBC programme Trust Me I'm a Doctor in investigating and debunking the widely held belief that male beards contain a stockpile of dangerous bacteria.

== Education ==
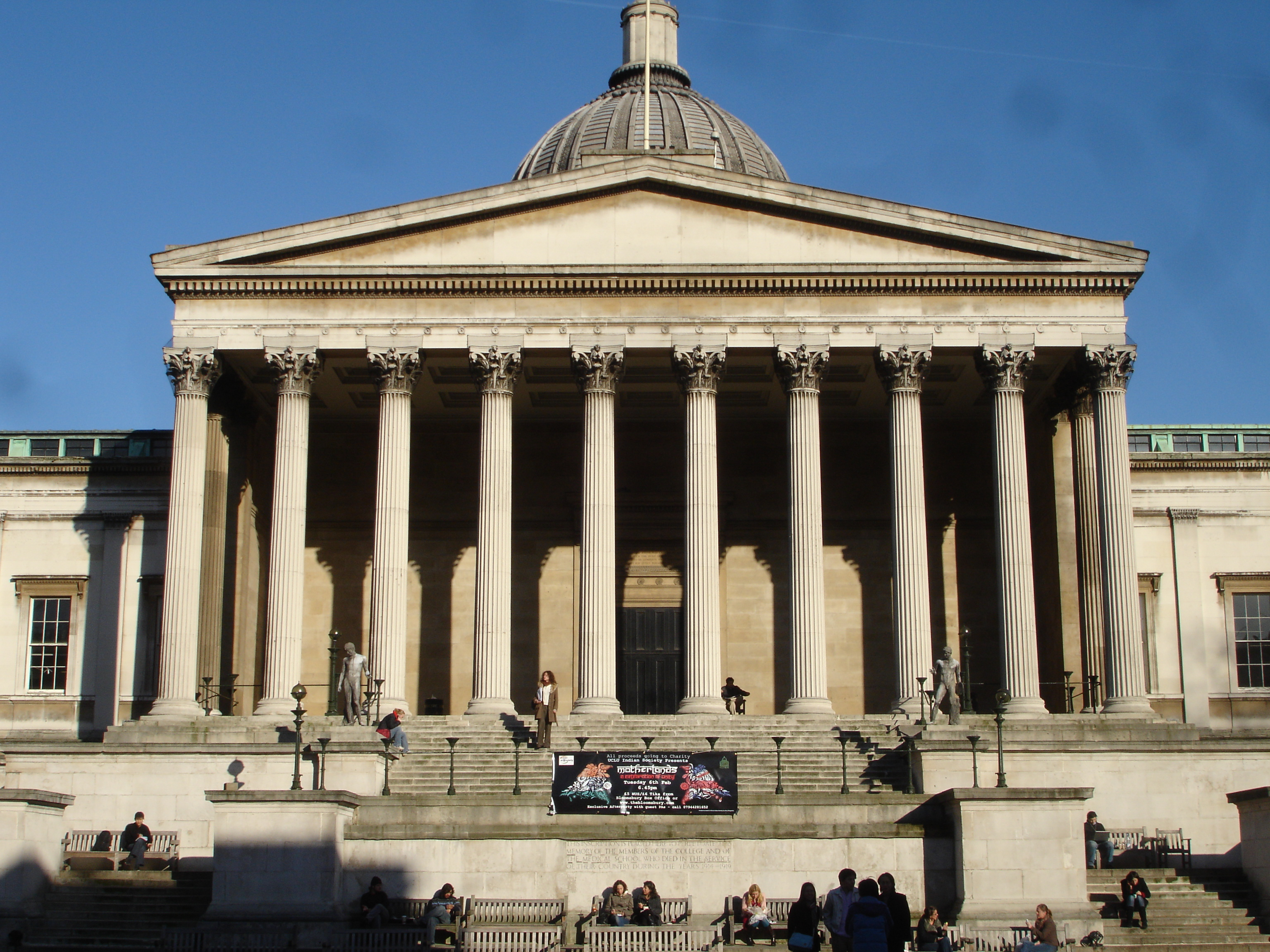
The main portico of University College London.

The institute offers a range of postgraduate courses including master's degrees, specialty training, certificates, diplomas, research-informed degrees and CPD courses. Educational activities are provided through four departments:

=== Continuing Professional Development Department ===
The Continuing Professional Development Department delivers part-time programmes as well as short courses on a wide range of areas relevant to contemporary oral health care.

=== Craniofacial Growth and Development Department ===
The Craniofacial Growth and Development Department is composed of two units: Orthodontics and Paediatric Dentistry.

=== Maxillofacial Medicine Department ===
The Maxillofacial Medicine Department is composed of two units: Oral & Maxillofacial Surgery and Special Care Dentistry.

=== Restorative Dentistry Department ===
The Restorative Dentistry Department is composed of three units: Endodontics, Periodontology and Prosthodontics.

The institute offers a range of postgraduate study routes, including master's degrees, specialty training, certificates, diplomas, research-informed degrees and CPD courses. At postgraduate level the institute currently offers a range of degree programmes. The institute also offers a range of CPD short courses.

== Library ==
The UCL Eastman Dental Library provides a specialist library and information service to students, researchers and professionals in the field of dental and oral health sciences. It serves both the UCL Eastman Dental Institute and Eastman Dental Hospital, including computing facilities for both HE and NHS users.

All full-time UCL staff and students are automatically enrolled as members of the library. Most Eastman Dental Hospital staff and students are also eligible for full membership

The library currently holds over 3,200 books, 70 locally held journal titles, and also has access to many e-journals, e-books and online databases. A small collection of DVDs and CD ROMs are available.

UCL staff and students with UCL computer accounts can access an extensive number of databases. Visitors to the library can use the Explore Access Point computers to use those licensed for walk-in users.

== Rankings ==
The institute achieved top scores of 5 in both the 1996 and 2001 Research Assessment Exercises and the institute's research programme is one of only two oral themes to achieve national funding within an NHS Biomedical Research Centre, as part of the UCLH/UCL Biomedical Research Centre. Both the institute and the Eastman Dental Hospital are part of UCL Partners, the largest academic health science centre in Europe.

The institute achieved a good outcome in the 2014 Research Excellence Framework, achieving the highest corrected GPA in Dentistry, and has one of the strongest National Institute for Health and Care Research-funded translational portfolios in Dentistry. A citation analysis conducted by RAND Corporation in 2015 ranked dentistry at UCL (the EDI plus the UCL Department of Epidemiology and Public Health) as second in the UK for world leading publications in Dentistry and first for partner NHS organisation.

In the QS World University Rankings by Subject 2017 the institute is ranked 6th in the world for Dentistry. UCL is ranked 7th in the world overall.

== Errors with students' results (2005–14) ==
In June 2016 it was reported in the Times Higher Education (THE) that hundreds of students who studied at the UCL Eastman Dental Institute between 2005-6 and 2013-14 had been given the wrong marks for their assessments. These administrative errors led to an unknown number of students being attributed with the wrong qualifications and, in some cases, being failed when they should have passed their degrees.

The report of an internal investigation carried out by UCL's Academic Committee between October and December 2013, noted that the institute's own internal review had found 220 module marks errors for students having studied on a single degree between 2005 and 2013. According to the report, concerns over the accuracy of marks were raised internally in 2011 and 2012, however the matter was ultimately brought to the Registrar's attention in July 2013. A spokesperson for UCL confirmed that a professional data review of all the institute's taught programmes, which was recommended by the Academic Committee Review Panel in 2013, was incomplete as of June 2016 and gave assurances that affected students would be contacted.

UCL's Academic Committee Review Panel noted in its report that, according to the institute's own review findings, senior members of UCL staff had been aware of issues with students results but had not taken action to address them. The Review Panel concluded that there was an apparent lack of ownership of these matters amongst the institute's senior staff. It concluded that assessment data had been corrupted through human error; as a result of inconsistent processes and poor quality assurance; poor record keeping; and poor oversight.

The Academic Committee Review Panel noted that students might potentially have legitimate claims to damages and compensation; it recommended that the institute should consider offering students the opportunity to be re-assessed and compensation for inconvenience or, consider termination of students' registration and negotiation of financial settlements.
