= Royal Free London NHS Foundation Trust =

NHS hospital trust

- Type: NHS foundation trust
- Established: 1991
- Headquarters: Pond Street; London; NW3 2QG
- Hospitals: Barnet Hospital; Chase Farm Hospital; North Middlesex University Hospital; Royal Free Hospital
- Chair: Mark Lam
- Chief executive: Peter Landstrom
- Staff: 12,792
- Website: www.royalfree.nhs.uk

The Royal Free London NHS Foundation Trust (formerly the Royal Free Hampstead NHS Trust) is an NHS foundation trust based in London, United Kingdom. It comprises Royal Free Hospital, Barnet Hospital, Chase Farm Hospital and North Middlesex University Hospital. It also runs clinics at Edgware Community Hospital and Finchley Memorial Hospital. On 1 July 2014, the Barnet and Chase Farm Hospitals NHS Trust was acquired by Royal Free London NHS Foundation Trust, making it one of the largest trusts in the country. On 1 January 2025, the Trust merged with North Middlesex University Hospital NHS Trust, acquiring management of North Middlesex University Hospital. The two trusts had been formally partnered (sharing members of management staff) since 2021.

== History ==
The Free Hospital was founded in 1828 to provide free hospital care to the poor. A royal charter was granted by Queen Victoria in 1837 in recognition of the hospital's treatment of cholera victims. For a long period, the Royal Free Hospital was the only hospital in London to offer clinical instruction to women and was closely associated with the London School of Medicine for Women, later renamed Royal Free Hospital School of Medicine.

Royal Free Hospital moved to its present site in the mid-1970s, bringing together the old Royal Free Hospital on Gray's Inn Road with the Lawn Road, New End and Hampstead General hospitals. The former Hampstead Children's Hospital became the nursing accommodation for the hospital.

In April 1991, the Royal Free Hampstead NHS Trust, comprising Royal Free Hospital and Royal National Throat, Nose, and Ear Hospital, became one of the first NHS trusts established under the provisions of the NHS and Community Care Act 1990. In August 2008, the trust announced its intention to form the UCLPartners academic health science centre with University College London, Great Ormond Street Hospital for Children NHS Trust, Moorfields Eye Hospital NHS Foundation Trust, and University College London Hospitals NHS Foundation Trust. UCLPartners was officially designated as an academic health science centres by the UK Department of Health in March 2009. In April 2011 the trust announced that it would be making 450 redundancies as part of a plan to reduce costs by £40m per year.

The Royal Free Hampstead NHS Trust was authorised by Monitor as an NHS foundation trust on 1 April 2012, subsequently changing its name to Royal Free London NHS Foundation Trust. In the same month, University College London Hospitals NHS Foundation Trust took over management of Royal National Throat, Nose, and Ear Hospital from the trust.

In 2013, the trust had an annual turnover of around £450m and employed around 4,600 staff. Royal Free Hospital has a total of roughly 900 beds and treats around 700,000 patients each year. In partnership with University College London (UCL), the trust has major research activities and it forms part of the UCLPartners academic health science centre. The Royal Free Hospital is also a teaching centre for the UCL Medical School.

In March 2017, the trust sold land at Chase Farm Hospital in Enfield to the Royal Free Charity for £50m. The charity plans to use the land to provide housing for staff.

== Organisation ==
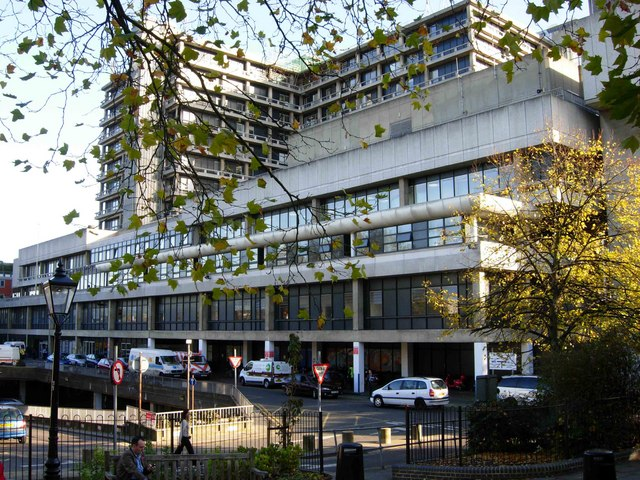
Royal Free Hospital

The trust has a board of directors comprising eleven statutory members including the chairman (currently Mark Lam) and Chief Executive (currently Peter Landstrom) of the trust. The role of the Board is to consider the key strategic and managerial issues facing the trust in carrying out its statutory and other functions. The Chief Executive is responsible for the overall performance of the executive functions of the trust.

The trust also has a council of governors which is responsible for working with the board of directors to produce plans for the future development of the trust. It's also in charge of receiving, at a public meeting, copies of the trust's annual accounts, auditor's reports, and annual reports. The council of governors is composed of 25 members, of whom 6 are elected members from the public constituency, 5 are elected members from the staff constituency, and 7 are elected members from the patient constituency.

== Performance ==
When the trust took over Barnet and Chase Farm Hospitals Trust in 2014, it discovered a large backlog of patients waiting for elective treatment that year. By April 2015, the trust had reviewed 7,174 patients who have now received treatment. The review concluded that one patient "may have experienced serious harm" and 39 patients had "potentially" suffered "moderate harm", and 68 patients may have suffered "low harm". 1,541 patients were sent to private providers since July 2014, predominately for endoscopy and ear, nose, and throat treatments.

In November 2014, the trust started a project to scan 750,000 documents using Kodak scanners as part of its move to paper free working. Business process outsourcing firm MISL was scanning partner in an operation which would take more than a year. The project aimed at analysing data of patients to identify previously unknown trends about medical conditions.

The trust has access to patients' GP records in the Urgent Care Centre run by Haverstock Healthcare in its A&E department using the EMIS Web integrated clinical IT system. This enables the majority of patients to be sent home with written information on self care or referred to a pharmacy.

The trust reported that vacancies had reached 1/6 of the nursing workforce in July 2015.

In February 2016, it was expecting a deficit of £15m for the year 2015/16. A deficit of more than £95m was expected for the 2017/18 financial year.

In September 2016, the trust was selected by NHS England as one of twelve Global Digital Exemplars.

In a report of the Care Quality Commission completed in May 2019, the trust's overall surgical safety rating was downgraded from "good" to "requires improvement", due to a "large number" of "never events" — incidents so serious they should never have happened — which were partially related to "poor behaviours" by a few consultants at the Royal Free London NHS Trust and failures of the trust's management.

In November 2020, the trust had 9,050 patients waiting 52 or more weeks for treatment on its elective waiting list, with another 10,542 who had waited 40–52 weeks.

== Research ==
In partnership with UCL Medical School, the trust has major research activities and is a founding member of UCLPartners, the largest academic health science partnership in Europe, which in addition to the trust comprises University College London, Great Ormond Street Hospital for Children NHS Trust, Moorfields Eye Hospital NHS Foundation Trust, and University College London Hospitals NHS Foundation Trust.

In 2016, it set up a project with DeepMind to develop new clinical mobile apps linked to electronic patient records. The first app will be used to detect acute kidney injury.

== Teaching ==
Royal Free Hospital is the largest single-site teaching hospital in London and home to one of the three main campuses of UCL Medical School. The trust is also involved in the training of nurses, midwives and other clinical and non-clinical professionals.

== See also ==
- UCL Neuroscience
- Francis Crick Institute
- Healthcare in London
