= Eastman Dental Hospital =

Coordinates: 51.5264°N 0.1178°W

- University College London Hospitals NHS Foundation Trust
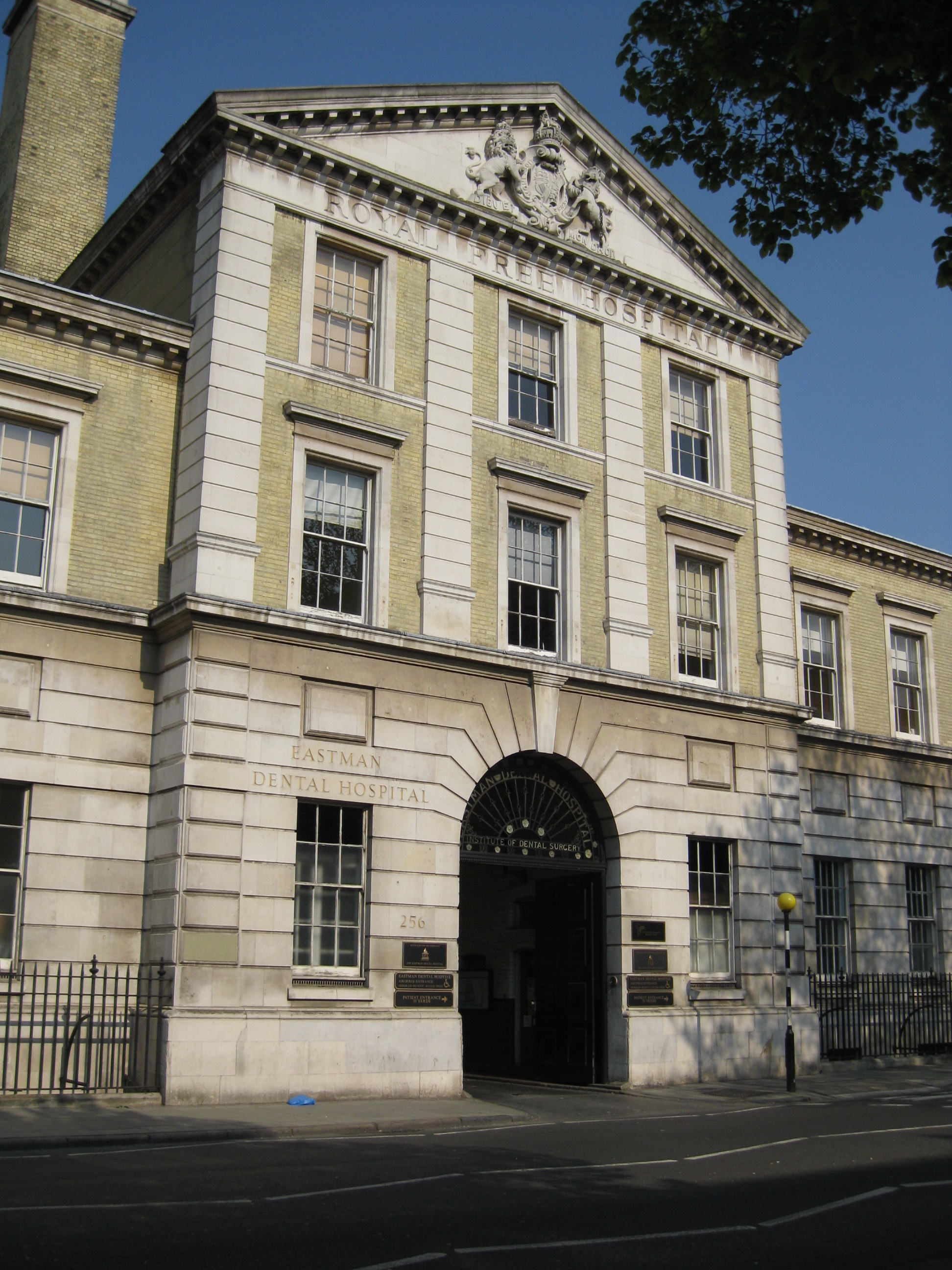
- Eastman Dental Hospital

- Location within Camden

Geography
- Location: London, England

Organisation
- Care system: NHS England
- Type: Teaching
- Affiliated university: University College London

Services
- Emergency department: Yes, for children only
- Speciality: Dentistry

History
- Founded: 1931

Links
- Website: www.uclh.nhs.uk/our-services/our-hospitals/royal-national-ent-and-eastman-dental-hospitals
- Lists: Hospitals in England

The Eastman Dental Hospital was based on Gray's Inn Road until it co-located with the University College London ear, nose, throat, balance and hearing services on Huntley Street, London, as the Royal National ENT and Eastman Dental Hospitals in October 2019. The hospital continues to provide specialist dental treatment as well as ear, nose, throat, hearing, speech and balance services and is part of the University College London Hospitals NHS Foundation Trust.

The dental hospital is closely associated with University College London (UCL), and has a partnership with the UCL Eastman Dental Institute, which has stayed at the Gray's Inn Road site. It is a major centre for dental research and the largest provider of postgraduate teaching and training in dentistry in Europe. In 2009, there were more than 22,000 orthodontic appointments at the hospital, making its orthodontic department one of the largest in the UK. The hospital is part of both the UCLH/UCL Biomedical Research Centre and the UCL Partners academic health science centre.

== History ==
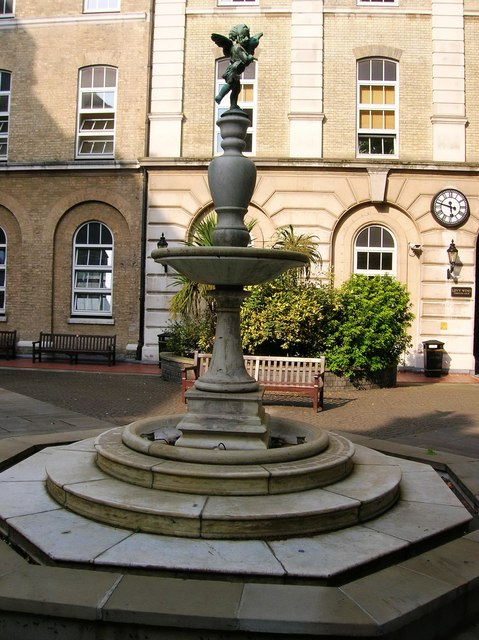
Fountain at the hospital

In 1926, George Eastman donated £200,000 (plus another £100,000 from two other principal benefactors) for the establishment of a specialist dental and oral health clinic for the benefit of poor children of Central London. The Eastman Dental Clinic was constructed between 1928 and 1930 to the design of Sir John Burnet and Partners and was opened on 20 November 1931 by the American Ambassador. Until 1947/48, the clinic was integrated into the Royal Free Hospital. Afterwards, as an independent institution, it was established as the postgraduate dental institute of the Postgraduate Medical Federation. The bust of George Eastman was moved to the new hospital on Huntley Street, WC1 6DG, in October 2019.

The objectives of the Institute were:

The training of consultants, specialists and teachers, in various branches of dentistry. To provide facilities for and encourage research by members of staff and students. To provide clinical and laboratory facilities and instruction for candidates working for higher degrees or diplomas. To provide short courses for general practitioners, in so far as it is possible to do so without interfering with the main objects as set out above.

The future role of the institute and hospital in national and worldwide postgraduate dental education and training was created with the establishment of the Faculty of Dental Surgery, in 1948, at the Royal College of Surgeons by Sir Robert Vivian Bradlaw, and the creation of the Dental Fellowship examination.

After the creation of the National Health Service, the need for free primary dental care was met nationally and the Eastman Clinic ended its routine treatment (but retaining a casualty service) and changed its name to the Eastman Dental Hospital.

It co-located with University College London ear, nose, throat, balance and hearing services on Huntley Street, in Bloomsbury, London, as the Royal National ENT and Eastman Dental Hospitals in October 2019.

In 2019, project manager Arcadis and contractor ISG Ltd began work to expand the footprint of the Eastman Dental Hospital site on Gray's Inn Road to enable construction of a new building for the UCL Queen Square Institute of Neurology and a hub for the UK Dementia Research Institute. Completion was scheduled for late 2023, for occupation in 2024.

== Services ==
The following services are currently provided at the hospital:

- Oral medicine and Special Needs Dentistry
- Oral and Maxillofacial Surgery
- Orthodontics
- Paediatric Dentistry
- Conservative Dentistry
- Periodontology
- Prosthetic Dentistry
- X-ray
- The Eastman Practice
- Burkhart School of Dental Hygiene and Dental Therapy
- Education and Training (Accredited) Assessment Centre for Dental Nurses

== See also ==
- Francis Crick Institute
