= Jacqueline Flindall =

English nursing instructor (1932–2023

FRCN Jacqueline Flindall
- Born: 12 October 1932
- Died: 22 March 2023 (aged 90)
- Occupation: Nurse
- Known for: Leadership, clinical education, and commentary

Jacqueline Flindall FRCN (12 October 1932 – 22 March 2023) was a leader, educator, and commentator on nursing issues.

== Background and training ==
Jacqueline Flindall was born in London on 12 October 1932. She attended a Welsh boarding school in Ashford, Middlesex which was evacuated to Powis Castle in Welshpool during World War II. Flindall undertook General Nurse training at UCLH (University College Hospital London), obtaining State Registration in 1953; she also undertook Midwifery training. Subsequently, she took part in a one year exchange program with Mount Sinai Hospital in New York focusing on obstetrics and the Special Care Baby Unit. Upon her return to the UK, she became a night sister and then a ward sister at UCLH. Between 1964 and 1965, while still at UCLH, she studied for a Diploma in Public Health Nursing via Battersea College of Technology. Thereafter, she achieved a Diploma in Medical Nursing at the University of London. She also undertook the Clinical Teachers Course at the Royal College of Nursing. In 1969, Flindall was among winners of an award offered by the British Commonwealth Nurses War Memorial Fund to study in North America.

== Further career ==
Flindall broadened her management experience as an Assistant Superintendent at the Prince of Wales and St. Ann's Hospital group of Tottenham, North London. Thereafter, she became Assistant Matron at the new Wexham Park Hospital, Slough. In 1969, Flindall was appointed as the Chief Nursing Officer and given the task of commissioning the new Northwick Park Hospital, Harrow. In 1973, she was acknowledged for recognising the role of the hospital's integrated Personnel department in nursing issues such as welfare and recruitment. In 1975, Flindall stood as a candidate for election for the General Nursing Council.

Following the 1973 National Health Service Reorganisation Act, Flindall was appointed as Chief Nursing Officer to the Oxfordshire Health Authority and remained in post for ten years. In a 1975 article, Flindall discussed the challenges posed by the reorganisation act in terms of a new three-tiered organisational structure, ensuing communication challenges, and alteration of staff roles. With emerging shortfalls in community care, post discharge from hospital, Flindall took part in 1974 debates regarding the development of preventative and post discharge community care, contemporary choices, and priorities. Also, in her role overviewing community nurse training and resources, she wrote to the British Medical Journal in 1976 commenting on use of nurses in GP practice leading to possible depletions in the district. Flindall later gave impetus and support to the Nursing Development Unit at Burford Cottage Hospital in Oxfordshire. The Burford Unit was an innovative nurse-led community-facility led by nurses, however with the central idea of patient involvement in care. Flindall provided the introduction to a book on the therapeutic style of treatments being implemented at the Burford Unit. In 1983, just before leaving Oxford, Flindall failed to gain the support of Oxfordshire nurses for her proposal of a nurse contribution towards an Educational Trust Fund for non-statutory training.

In 1983, Flindall was appointed as Regional Nursing Officer of the Wessex Region where she remained for two years at which point she took early retirement from a substantive NHS role.

== Awards ==
Flindall was awarded Fellowship of the Royal College of Nursing (FRCN) in 1983.

== Other clinical contributions ==
Flindall was a proponent of nurse education and believed that patients benefitted from being allocated to the care of a nurse who would provide individually tailored care, moving away from traditional task-oriented nursing. During an address at the 1980 RCN Professional Conference, in addition to her argument for individually tailored care, she stated the need for better training for the key role of sister.

In 1980, Flindall attended the Royal College of Nursing Professional Conference at RCN Congress and contributed with the delivery of a paper discussing the economics of nursing.

== Retirement and later years ==
Following early retirement from substantive NHS employment at the age of fifty-three, Flindall continued to work for some years as a consultant and as a magistrate. Thereafter, Flindall stood for RCN Presidency in 1986 while undertaking consultancy work. Further into retirement, she continued with healthcare voluntary work which included escorting people to hospital appointments and remained an advocate for patient care, writing in 2008 after visiting a friend in hospital and noting care to be, in her view, substandard. She contributed to the nursing press in 1994 with views on articles that caught her attention.

In 2021, her garden was open under the National Gardens Scheme to fundraise for healthcare charities.

Flindall died on 22 March 2023.
