= Finchley Memorial Hospital =

- Royal Free London NHS Foundation Trust
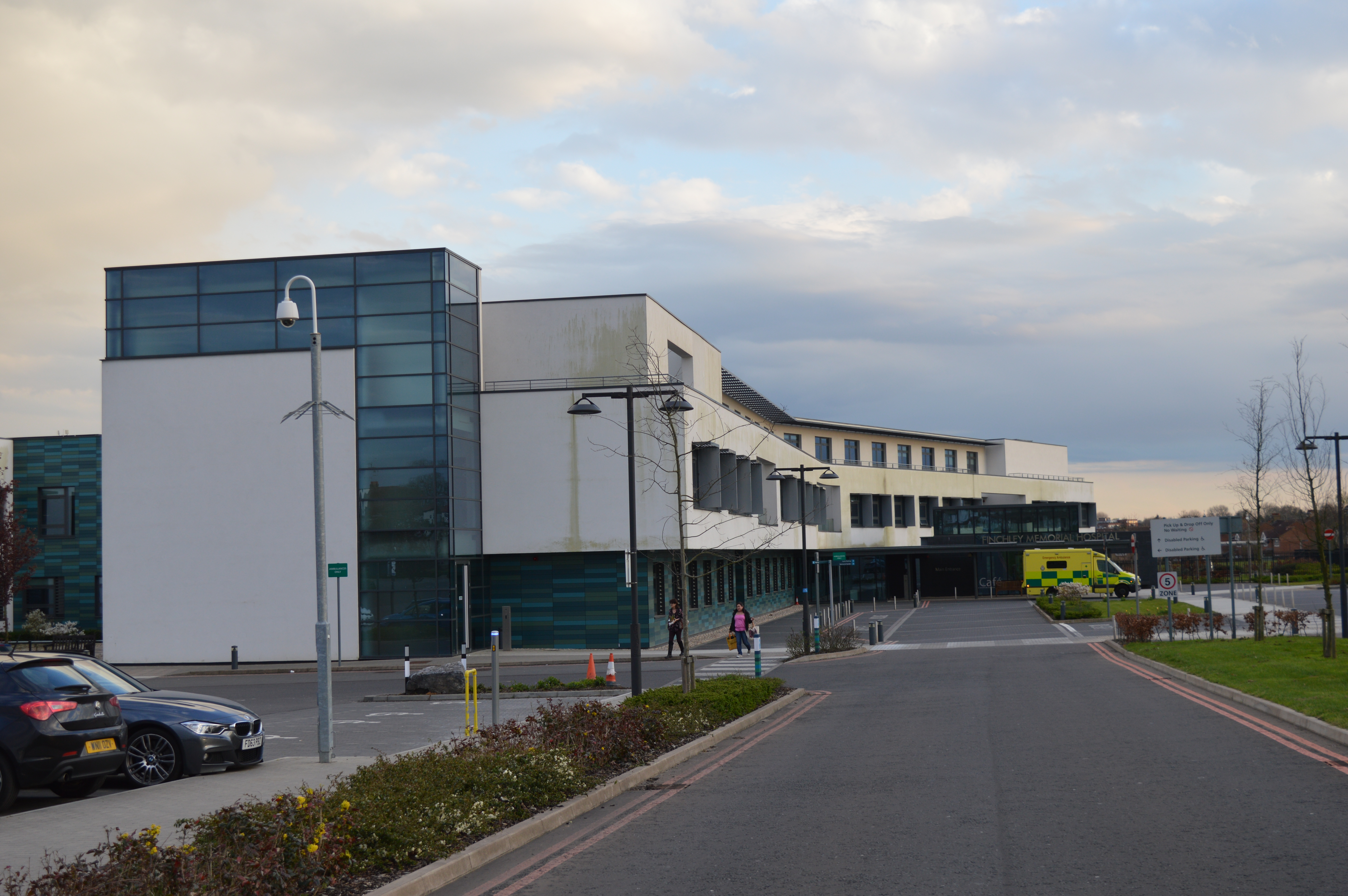
- Finchley Memorial Hospital

- Location within Barnet

Geography
- Location: Granville Road, North Finchley N12 0JE, London, England, United Kingdom
- Coordinates: 51.6056°N 0.1763°W

Organisation
- Care system: NHS England
- Type: Community

Services
- Emergency department: No Accident & Emergency

History
- Founded: 28 May 1908; 118 years ago

Links
- Website: www.barnetccg.nhs.uk/urgent-care-and-walk-in-centres.htm
- Lists: Hospitals in England

Finchley Memorial Hospital is a National Health Service community hospital in Granville Road, North Finchley, London. Hospital services are provided by Royal Free London NHS Foundation Trust.

== History ==
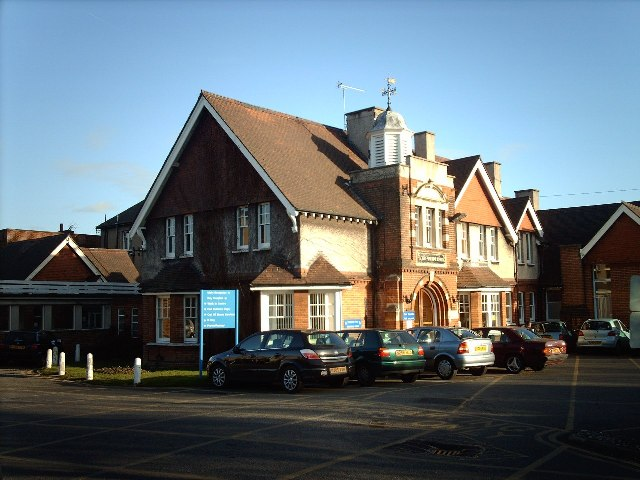
The former hospital buildings

The hospital was originally established as the Finchley Cottage Hospital and opened with 20 beds on 28 May 1908. An extension financed by public subscription which would form a lasting memorial for the Finchley dead of the First World War was opened by General Sir Ian Hamilton in 1922. The facility was renamed the Finchley Memorial Hospital that year.

A casualty department opened in 1926 and a two-storey accommodation block for nurses opened in 1933. A geriatric day facility was opened by Margaret Thatcher, the local MP, in January 1987.

A new three-storey hospital building replacing the original was procured under a Private Finance Initiative contract in 2010. It was built by Galliford Try at a cost of £28 million and was opened by the Duke of Gloucester in September 2013.

== Facilities ==
The hospital does not include an accident and emergency department, but it does offer a walk-in centre for minor injuries that do not present an immediate threat to life.
