= University College Hospital at Westmoreland Street =

Coordinates: 51.51968°N 0.14973°W

- University College London Hospitals NHS Foundation Trust
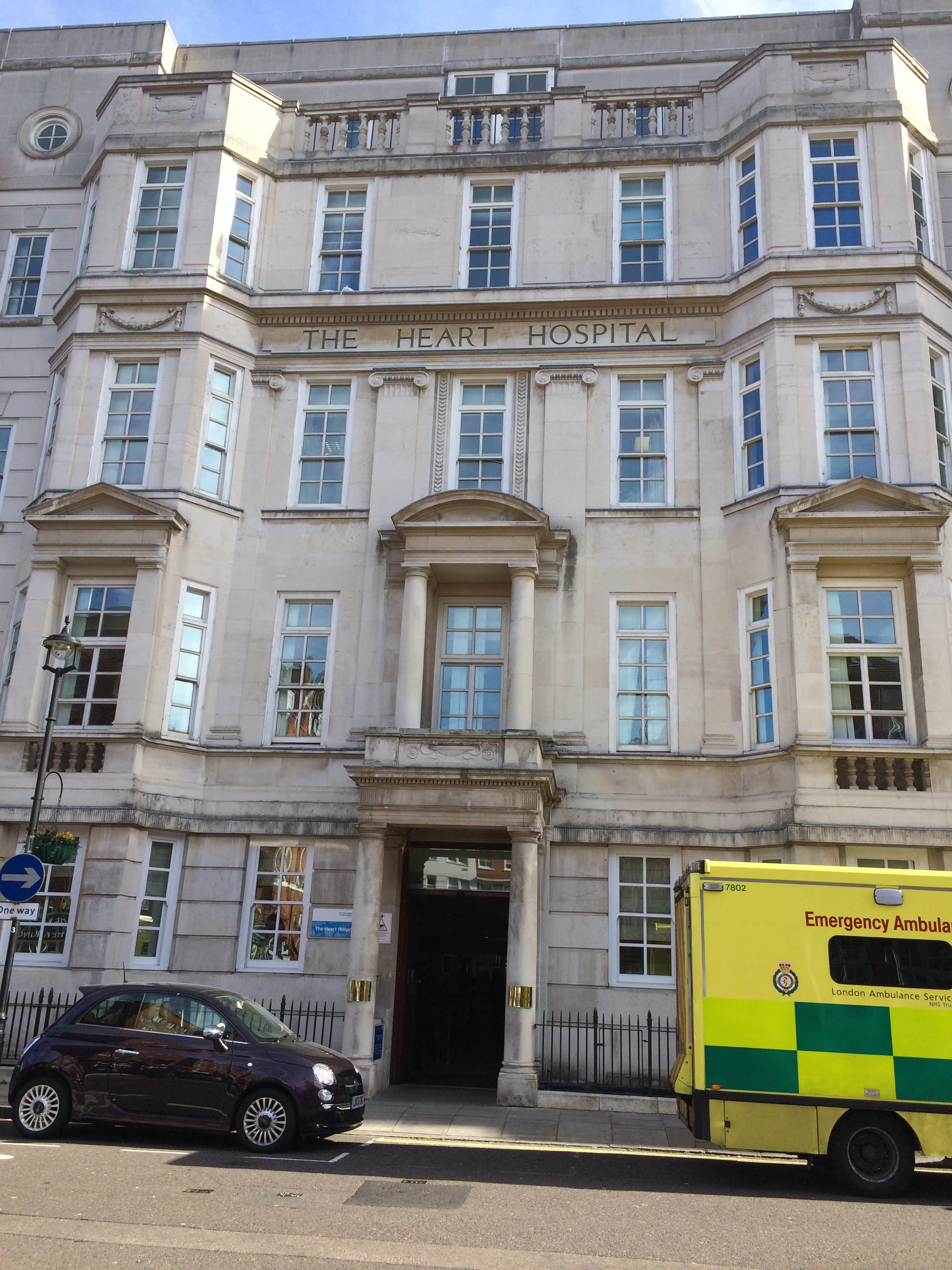
- University College Hospital at Westmoreland Street in March 2015

Geography
- Location: London, United Kingdom

Organisation
- Care system: NHS England
- Type: Teaching
- Affiliated university: University College London

Services
- Emergency department: No Accident & Emergency
- Beds: 95
- Speciality: Thoracic surgery and urology services

History
- Founded: 1857

Links
- Website: University College London Hospitals NHS Foundation Trust
- Lists: Hospitals in the United Kingdom

University College Hospital at Westmoreland Street, named The Heart Hospital until refurbished and renamed in 2015, was a specialist cardiac hospital located in London, United Kingdom until 2015. It is part of the University College London Hospitals NHS Foundation Trust and is closely associated with University College London (UCL). After the 2015 refurbishment, the hospital now provides thoracic surgery and urology services.

Before the 2015 refurbishment, the Heart Hospital conducted over 1,000 surgical heart operations each year, had 95 in-patient beds, and was one of the largest cardiac centres in the UK. It treated around 1,700 new outpatients, 5,500 follow-up outpatients and 1,200 inpatients each year. It was a centre for cardiac research, home to the UCL Centre for Cardiology in the Young, and part of the UCLH/UCL Biomedical Research Centre and the UCL Partners academic health science centre.

== History ==
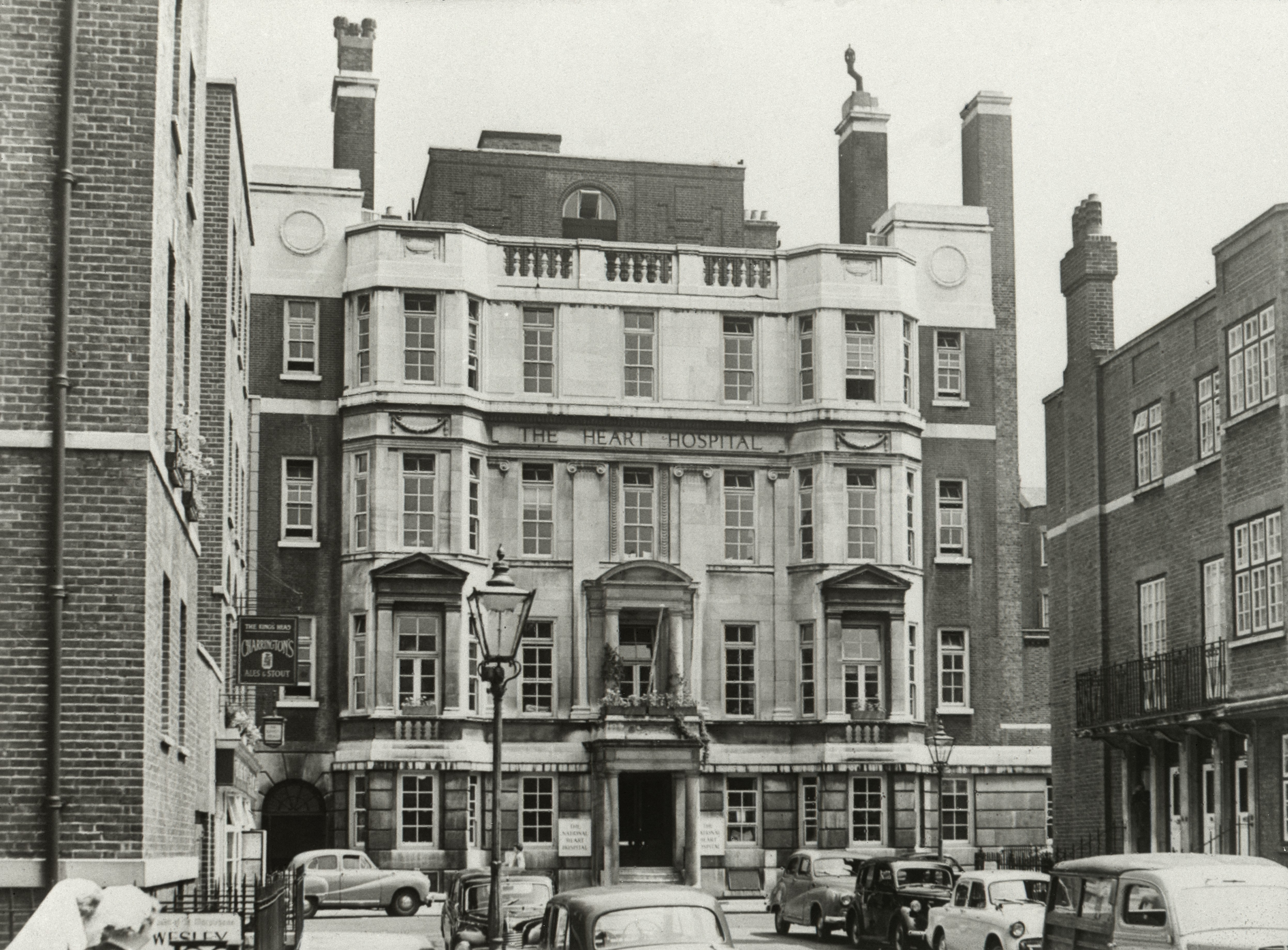
National Heart Hospital, Westmoreland Street

The National Heart Hospital was founded in 1857 by Dr Eldridge Spratt in Margaret Street. The hospital was relocated to Newman Street off Oxford Street around 1869 and then to Soho Square in 1874, with various changes of name en route, including in 1872 "The National Hospital for the Special Treatment of Paralysis, Epilepsy, Nervousness, and the Primary Stages of Insanity and other diseases from Affectations of the Heart." In 1913, new premises were constructed in the current location on Westmoreland Street near Harley Street. It was one of the first hospitals in the world specifically built for treating cardiovascular disease, as well as for postgraduate training and research.

1991 the hospital was closed, and its services moved to the Royal Brompton Hospital. In 1994, the hospital building was sold to the private Gleneagles Hospital UK, and in 1997, it was re-opened as a private cardiac hospital, with new accommodation and equipment. After falling into debt as a private institution, the hospital was acquired by University College London Hospitals NHS Trust (now University College London Hospitals NHS Foundation Trust), rejoining the NHS. The hospital was renamed The Heart Hospital and re-opened as the new home for all of the trust's cardiac services, which had previously been based in the Middlesex Hospital. In 2015, all cardiac services moved to the Bart's Heart Centre at St Bartholomew's Hospital, following a review of cardiac servies in north and east London by NHS England and agreement by the boards of UCLH NHS Foundation Trust and Barts Health NHS Trust to combine their specialist cardiovascular services at the one site.

== Services ==
The hospital currently provides thoracic surgery and urology services. Cardiothoracic surgery and Cardiology services were provided at the hospital until 2015:

== See also ==
- Francis Crick Institute
