= Cyril Chantler =

British paediatric nephrologist

Professor Sir Cyril Chantler GBE FRCP FRCPCH FMedSci
- Born: 12 May 1939 (age 87)
- Education: St Catharine's College, Cambridge, University of London
- Known for: Measuring glomerular function in children, Chantler Review
- Awards: GBE, Kt
- Scientific career
- Fields: paediatric nephrology
- Workplaces: University of California, San Francisco, Guy's Hospital, Great Ormond Street Hospital

Sir Cyril Chantler (born 12 May 1939) is a British paediatric nephrologist. Chantler was notable for devising a method with Norman Veale of measuring glomerular function in children and later researched diet and growth failure in children with renal impairment. Chantler was most notable for holding an independent review of public health evidence for standardised tobacco packaging that later became known as the Chantler Review that led to standardised packaging for tobacco and cigarette packets.

== Life ==
Chantler was educated at Wrekin College between 1952 and 1957.

== Career ==
From 1971 to 1972, Chantler spent a year working at Institute of Child Health at Great Ormond Street, working in the department of Immunology run by John Soothill. In 1972, Chantler was appointed to a position at Guy's Hospital, before working for a year in the US, working with Paediatric Nephrologist Malcolm Holliday, at the University of California, San Francisco studying growth in rats with chronic renal failure, before returning in 1973 to continue working at Guys under Stewart Cameron.

From 1985 to 1988, Chantler was the General Manager of Guy's Hospital. From 1992 to 1998, Chantler was the principal of the United Medical and Dental Schools of Guy's and St Thomas' Hospitals. From 1997 to 2000, Chantler was the pro-vice chancellor of the University of London. From 2001 to 2008, Chantler was Chairman of the Great Ormond Street Hospital for Sick Children. Chantler was Consultant Paediatrician at Guy's Hospital from 1971 to 2000, and Fund Professor of Paediatric Nephrology at London University, 1990–2000, and emeritus since 2001.

== Chantler Review ==
On 28 November 2013, Chantler was asked by Jane Ellison, the British Conservative Party politician, if he would be willing to review cigarette packaging and to undertake an independent review to determine whether standardised packaging would be beneficial to the public good. Chantler accepted the role. Ellison wrote to him on 27 November 2013 to define the Terms of Reference. On 29 November, Chantler accepted the role, with a reply to Jane Ellison, stating he did not have any conflict of interests. A Terms of References method were defined to focus exclusively on the public health aspects of cigarette packet packaging and were to exclude legal issues, such as competition, trade marking, or freedom of choice. An economic investigation was also expressly forbidden. The Terms also defined the methods available to submit research.

In April 2014, Chantler produced the published report. In his conclusions, Chantler stated that it could not be proven conclusively that standardised cigarette packaging would reduce smoking, and that a large scale trial of such packaging would prove beneficial of such a trial would be difficult due to the number of actors, making it difficult to control. Chantler's most notable conclusion was that there was sufficient evidence to support standard packaging and tobacco control measures, that over time would return a modest reduction in the number of people smoking, particularly amongst children and young people.

Chantler stated of the report, that he was persuaded that branded packaging plays an important role in encouraging young people to smoke, and that he was not convinced by the tobacco industries response that plain cigarette packages would increase smoking uptake.

== Societies ==
- Chantler was chairman of the Beit Memorial Fellowships for Medical Research from 2003 to 2009.
- Chantler was chairman of the King's Fund charity, the independent think-tank, from 2 July 2004 to 14 September 2010. Chantler took over from Sir Graham Hart and was replaced by Sir Christopher Kelly.
- Member of Council of Southwark Cathedral.
- Member of the editorial board on Journal of the American Medical Association.
- Vice President of the Young Epilepsy charity.
- Chantler was first Chair of UCL Partners serving from 1 February 2009 to March 2014.
- Chantler was Chairman of the Beit Memorial Fellowships for Medical Research, from 2003 to 2009.

== Awards and honours ==
He was knighted in 1996 and was appointed Knight Grand Cross of the Order of the British Empire (GBE) in the 2017 New Year Honours for "services to leadership in healthcare".
