= Gray's Inn Road =

Road in the London Borough of Camden

Coordinates: 51°31′26″N 0°06′56″W

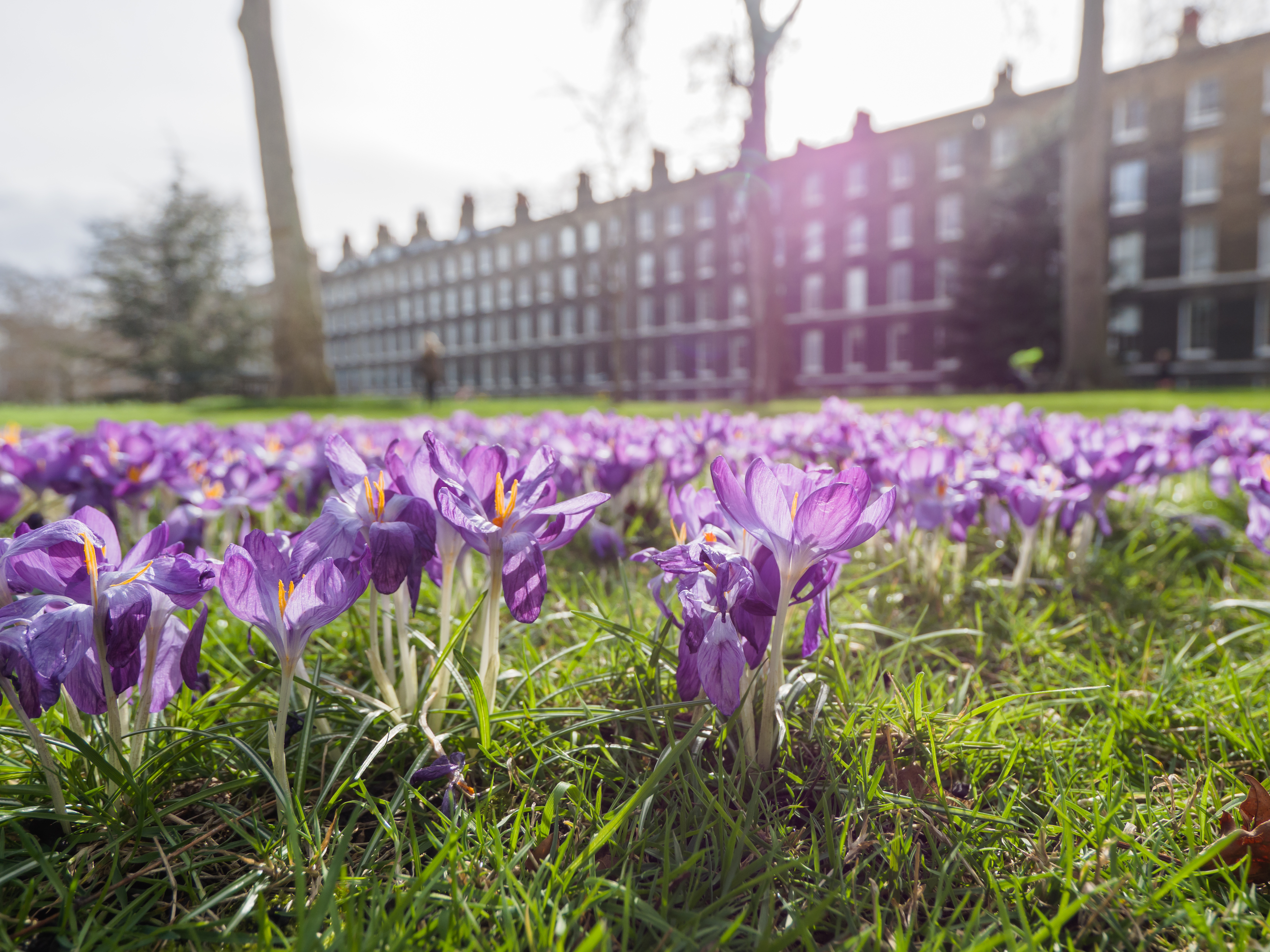
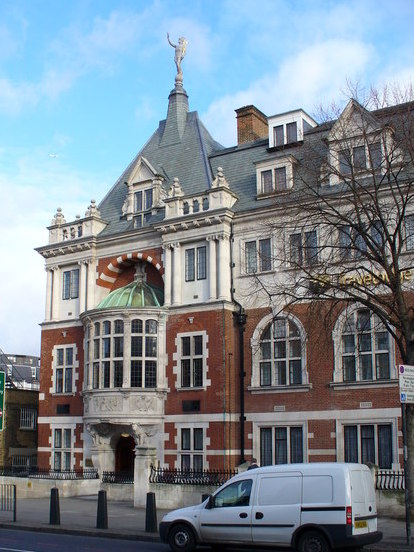
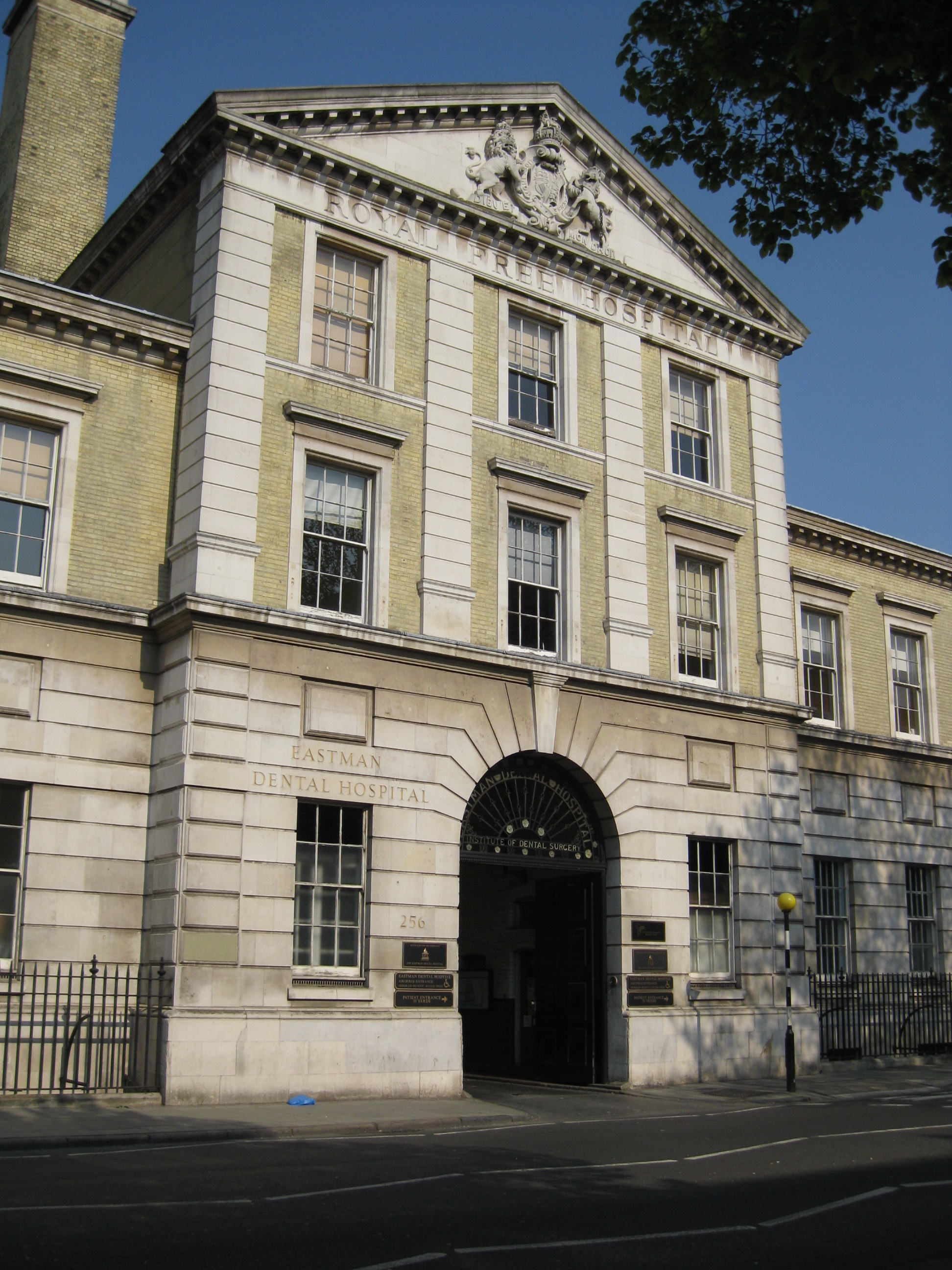

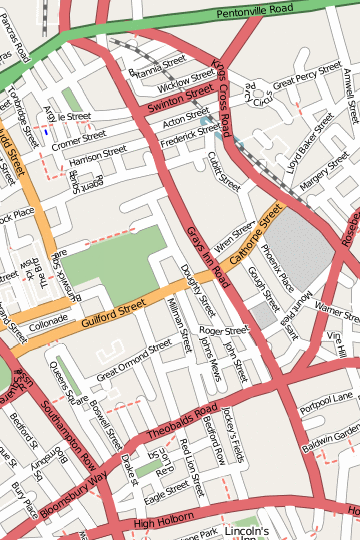
- Former names: Gray's Inn Lane; Graysynlane; Pourtepol Street
- Namesake: The Honourable Society of Gray's Inn
- Maintained by: Transport for London
- Location: London Borough of Camden, Central London
- Postal code: WC1
- Nearest Tube station: Northern end: King's Cross St Pancras; Southern end: Chancery Lane

Gray's Inn Road (or Grays Inn Road) is an important road in Central London, located in the London Borough of Camden. The road begins at its junction with Holborn at the City of London boundary, passes north through the Holborn and King's Cross districts and terminates at King's Cross railway station. It is designated as part of the A5200 road.

As the home of the Honourable Society of Gray's Inn, one of England's four Inns of Court, Gray's Inn Road is known as a hub for law and legal professions in London. Gray's Inn Road is home to multiple scholarly institutes, including University College London's Eastman Dental Institute, a world-leading oral health institution, Westminster Kingsway College, and the City University of London's Inns of Court School of Law.

== Name ==
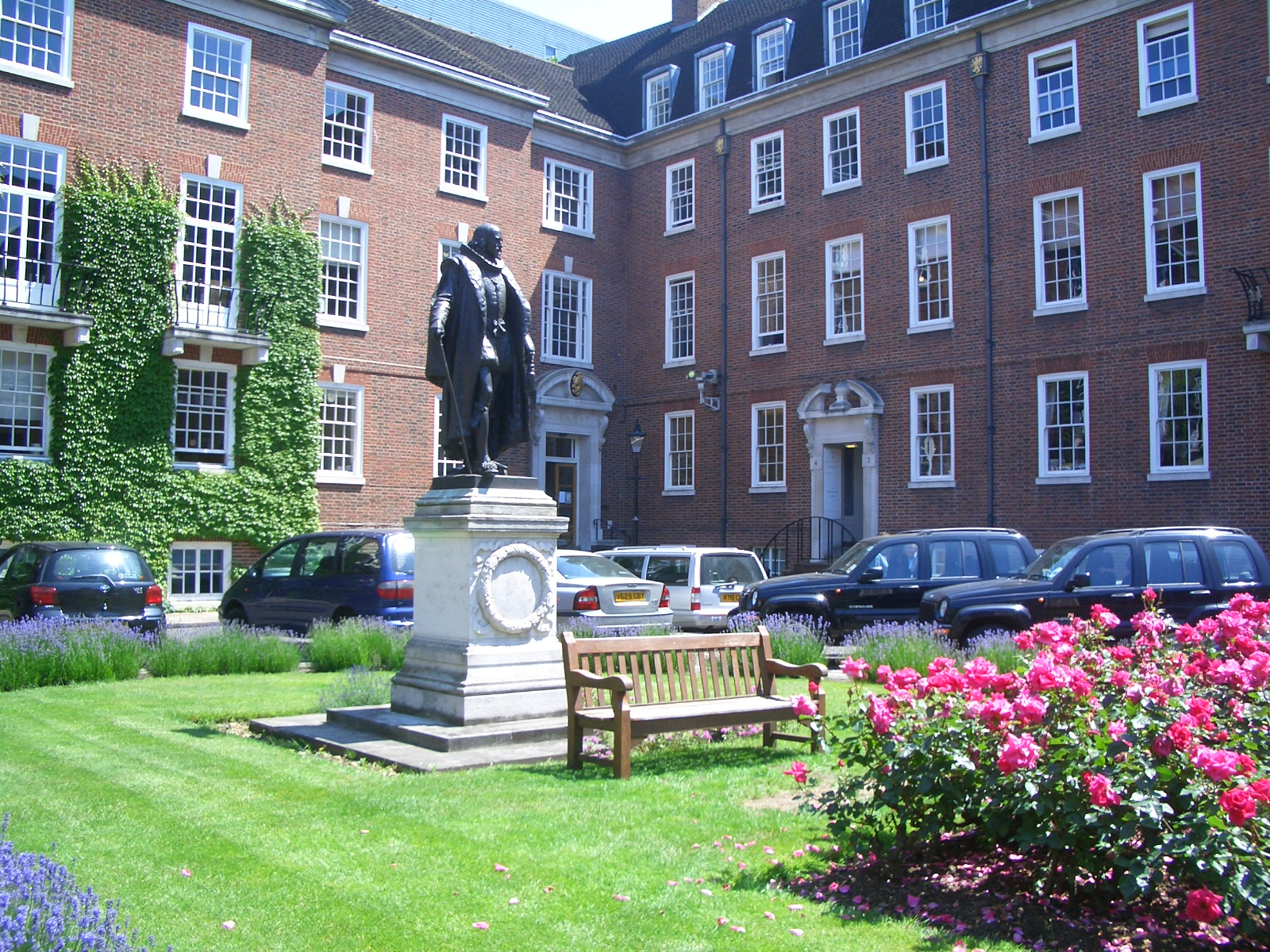
Gray's Inn, a historic and prestigious Inn of Court

The thoroughfare is first recorded as Purtepol Street in the 13th century, when the area formed part of Portpool Manor. After Reginald de Grey, 1st Baron Grey de Wilton purchased the area, his name soon came to be lent to Gray's Inn, which was founded on the street. By 1468, the road was known as Grays Inn Lane, or Graysynlane.

Richard Horwood's map (updated by William Faden in 1813) calls the whole stretch from Holborn to modern King's Cross "Grays Inn Lane", but by the mid-19th century it was solidified as Gray's Inn Road.

== History ==
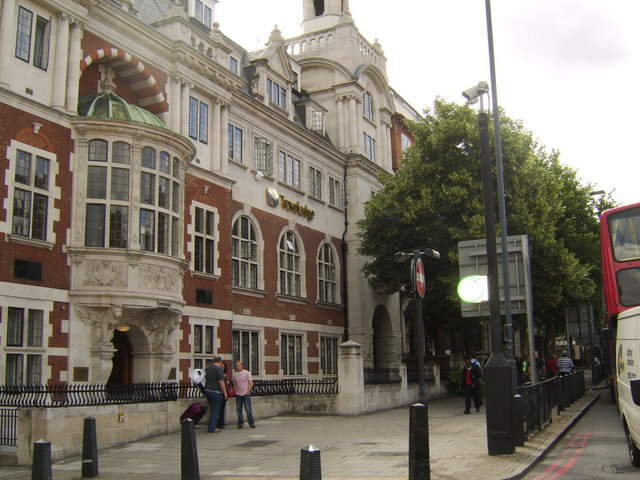
Gray's Inn Road by King's Cross

Throughout its route the road keeps to the higher ground, above the valley of the River Fleet to the east. In earlier times it was the principal route from London to Hampstead.

The area of Gray's Inn Road was clearly populated from palaeolithic times. Given the road's height above the Fleet valley, it may have formed part of an ancient trackway. A gravel bed off Gray's Inn Lane (see below) was the find spot for the c. 350,000-year-old Gray's Inn Lane Hand Axe in 1679. It was acquired by Hans Sloane and later donated to the British Museum, where it remains. Hand Axe Yard, a residential development adjoining Gray's Inn Road, takes its name from the object.

The manor of Portpool formerly existed in the same area as Gray's Inn, and although the manor is not mentioned in the Domesday Book it came into possession of the Dean and Chapter of St Paul's Cathedral and may have formed a separate estate of one of the Canons. From at least the 13th century onwards it was in the possession of the Grey family, after whom Gray's Inn is named.

The name "Purtepol Street" is recorded in the time of Henry III and this may be the first reference to the current Gray's Inn Road. In a document of 1299 it is called "Street of Pourtepol without London", which is appropriate as it lies only just outside the boundary of the City. In a document of 1468 the road is called "Graysynlane, otherwise Portpole Lane". Today's Portpool Lane, which leads off Gray's Inn Road to the east, is a separate road which is not mentioned before 1641.

On the "Woodcut" map of c.1561, "Greys ynne la." is shown leading from Holborn Bars to Gray's Inn, from where it becomes an unnamed track leading into the country. John Ogilby and William Morgan's map of 1676 shows "Grayes-Inn Lane" which is clearly built up as far as Elm Street, although that is the limit of the map. John Rocque's map of 1738 depicts "Grays Inn Lane" which clearly applies to the stretch from Holborn to the edge of the built up area (somewhat south of the present Calthorpe Street), but where it passes into the country it is called "Road to Hampstead and Highgate".

== Landmarks ==
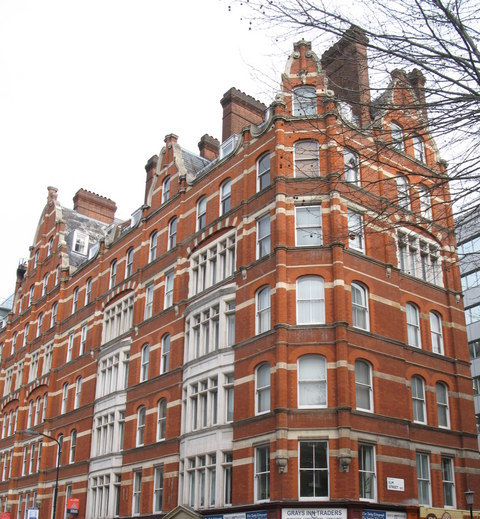
Churston Mansions

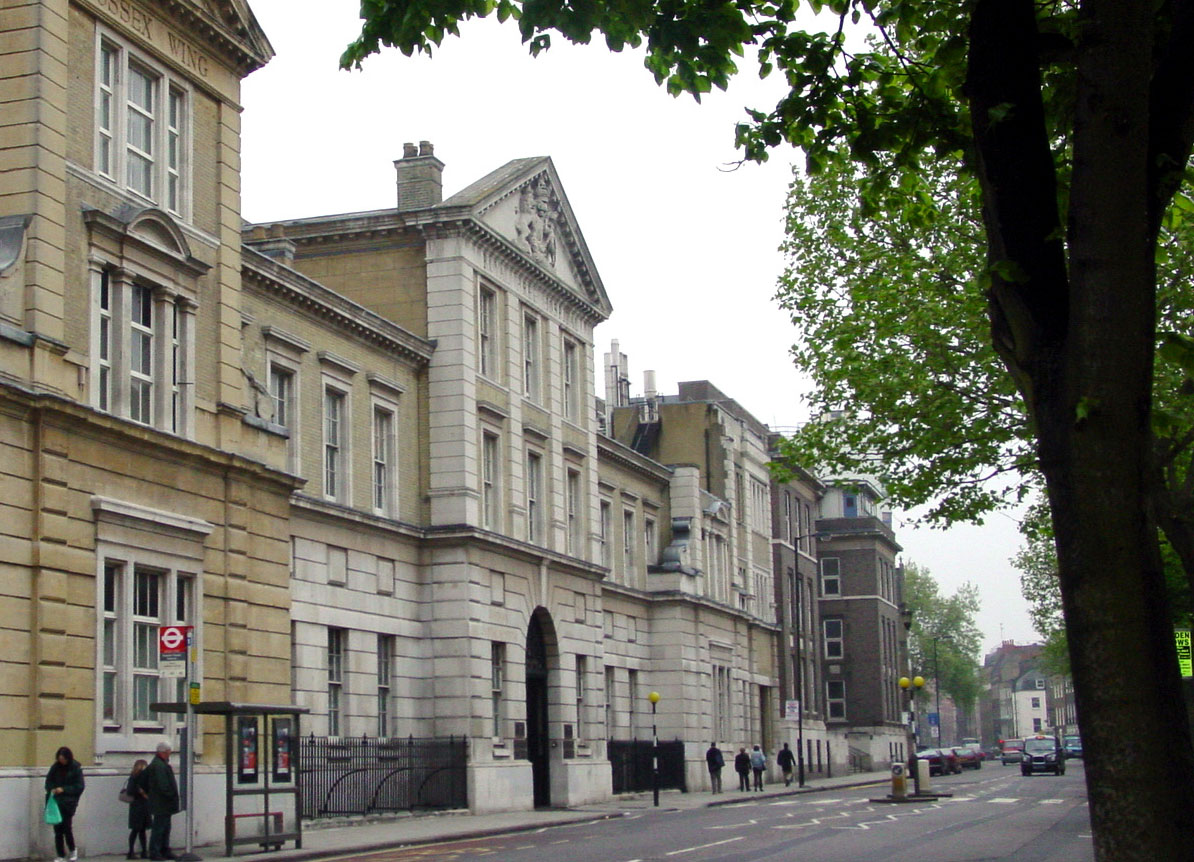
The Eastman Dental Hospital is a world leading institution in its field.

=== Institutions ===
- Honourable Society of Gray's Inn
- UCL Eastman Dental Institute
- ITN (former Times Newspapers building)
- ITV
- Royal National Throat, Nose and Ear Hospital
- London Welsh Centre

=== Buildings ===
- Gray's Inn
- Bourne Estate
- Trinity Court, Gray's Inn Road
- Eastman Dental Hospital
- Willing House
