= UCH Macmillan Cancer Centre =

- University College London Hospitals NHS Foundation Trust
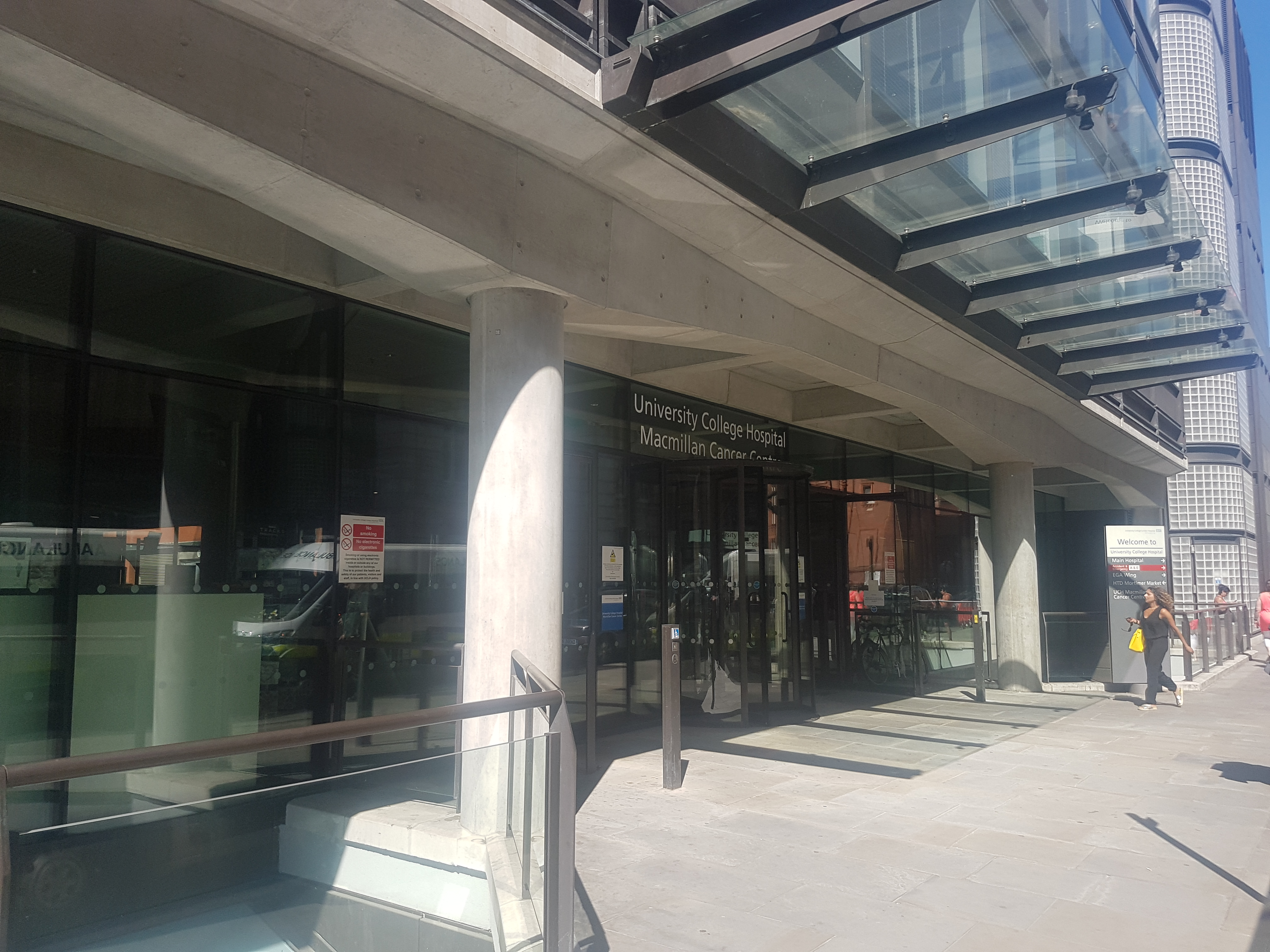
- Entrance to UCH Macmillan Cancer Centre

- Location within Camden

Geography
- Location: Huntley Street, London, United Kingdom
- Coordinates: 51.5232022°N 0.1372915°W

Organisation
- Care system: NHS England
- Type: Teaching
- Affiliated university: University College London

Services
- Beds: Outpatient only
- Speciality: Oncology

History
- Founded: 2012

Links
- Website: University College London Hospitals NHS Foundation Trust

UCH Macmillan Cancer Centre is a research-led day hospital in Huntley Street in central London. It is the oncology (cancer treatment) wing of University College Hospital, part of the University College London Hospitals NHS Foundation Trust.

== History ==
The building was designed by Hopkins Architects, with fundraising by London based businessman Christopher Moran. £10 million of the estimated £110 million cost was a donation by the charity Macmillan Cancer Support, hence the name of the building; other funders include the Teenage Cancer Trust. It has links to UCL Cancer Institute, to ensure that its treatment is current. The building is modelled on American "daycare" facilities, such as the Memorial Sloan Kettering Cancer Center in New York. It occupies the site of the former maternity hospital, the Elizabeth Garrett Anderson and Obstetric Hospital, in Huntley Street. The centre opened in April 2012.
