= Moorfields Eye Hospital NHS Foundation Trust =

English NHS foundation trust

- Type: NHS foundation trust
- Established: 21 March 1994
- Headquarters: 162 City Road; London; EC1V 2PD
- Hospitals: Moorfields Eye Hospital
- Staff: 2,619 (2023/24)
- Website: www.moorfields.nhs.uk

Moorfields Eye Hospital NHS Foundation Trust is an NHS foundation trust which runs Moorfields Eye Hospital.

The Trust employs over 1,700 people. Over 24,000 ophthalmic operations are carried out and over 300,000 patients are seen by the hospital each year.

The trust delivers its services from its main site on City Road and through its distributed network of over 25 other 'satellite' clinics located in other parts of London and the South East including Ealing, Teddington, Tooting, Croydon, Harrow, Tottenham, Hoxton, Barking, Bedford, Stratford and a diagnostic hub in Brent Cross Shopping Centre.

Moorfields has a specialised ophthalmic A&E department at City Road open 24 hours a day 365 a year and a telephone advice line, Moorfields Direct.

Moorfields was one of the first NHS foundation trusts and is a founder member of the UCLPartners, an academic health science centre.

It plans to move its main hospital from the current City Road site to St Pancras Hospital in Camden. This will cost £352 million and it is planned to be operational in 2027. Oriel is a partnership between Moorfields Eye Hospital NHS Trust, the UCL Institute of Ophthalmology (IoO) and Moorfields Eye Charity to create a world leading centre for advancing eye health.

== Commercial activities ==
In addition to its NHS clinical services Moorfields also has a number of commercial services: a private care service (Moorfields Private Patients), a corporate venturing subsidiary (Moorfields Ventures) and a pharmaceutical manufacturing service (Moorfields Pharmaceuticals).

Moorfields opened a branch in Dubai, UAE in July 2007, located in the Al Razi Medical Complex. Currently, the hospital is exploring international healthcare accreditation.

The trust requires a full funding agreement for "any and all treatment" in advance of accepting NHS referrals from outside England. It was owed more than £600,000 in 2015 for treatments in the previous three years, against invoices totalling just over £1m. It increased private income to 10% (15% if income from Dubai is included) from 2014 to 2016. About 25% of patients using private services came from overseas.

== Performance ==
It was named by the Health Service Journal as one of the top hundred NHS trusts to work for in 2015. At that time it had 1611 full-time equivalent staff and a sickness absence rate of 3.6%. 88% of staff recommend it as a place for treatment and 74% recommended it as a place to work.

A survey of almost 50,000 patients by the Care Quality Commission in 2021 found the emergency department most rated favourably of all those in England.

== See also ==
- List of NHS trusts
