= UCLPartners =

British health innovation company

- Formation: 2009
- Type: Health Innovation Company
- Headquarters: Hale House, 76-78 Portland Place,London,W1B 1NT, England, United Kingdom
- Website: uclpartners.com

UCLPartners is a health innovation company located in London, England. It serves a population of over 3.5 million across north central and north east London.

UCLPartners is partnered with some of the world’s leading hospitals and academic institutions, including Barts Health NHS Trust, Great Ormond Street Hospital for Children NHS Trust, Moorfields Eye Hospital NHS Foundation Trust, Royal Free London NHS Foundation Trust, University College London (UCL), and University College London Hospitals NHS Foundation Trust.

== History ==
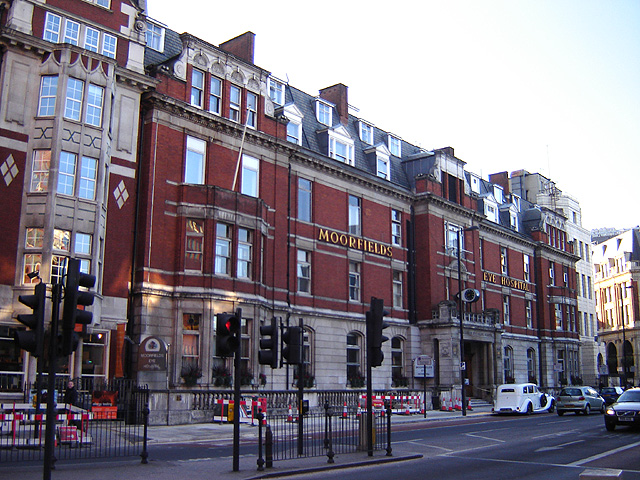
Moorfields Eye Hospital

In July 2007 the then Health Minister Lord Darzi recommended the establishment of a number of academic health science centres in the UK.

Great Ormond Street Hospital for Children NHS Trust, Moorfields Eye Hospital NHS Foundation Trust, Royal Free Hampstead NHS Trust (now Royal Free London NHS Foundation Trust), UCL and University College London Hospitals NHS Foundation Trust announced their intention to form UCLPartners in August 2008. In February 2009 Professor Sir Cyril Chantler was appointed as the first Chair of UCLPartners and it was officially designated as one of the UK's first academic health science centres by the UK Department of Health in March 2009.

Key strategic appointments were made in summer 2009, including Professor David Fish as Managing Director and seven Programme Directors. An alliance between UCL, UCLPartners, Yale University and Yale-New Haven Hospital was announced in October 2009. The UCLPartners academic strategy and key research priorities were agreed in November 2009. In October 2011 it was announced that Barts and The London NHS Trust and Queen Mary, University of London had agreed to join UCLPartners, making it the largest academic health science centre in the world.

Barking, Havering and Redbridge University Hospitals NHS Trust agreed to join UCLPartners in April 2012.

In May 2013 UCLPartners was officially designated as one of 15 Academic Health Science Networks established by the NHS in England.

In April 2014 UCLPartners established MedCity, an initiative to develop the life sciences cluster in London and the wider "golden triangle", in partnership with the Mayor of London, King's Health Partners, Imperial College Academic Health Science Centre and the Universities of Cambridge and Oxford.

== Organisation ==
The governing body of UCLPartners is UCLPartners Ltd, a company limited by guarantee. The governance arrangements consist of:

- A board led by an independent chair;
- An executive group comprising the four chief executives of the four NHS Trusts, the UCL Vice-Provost (health), the UCL Research Dean and the Managing Director of UCLPartners;
- Internationally renowned clinical academics to direct programmes for research, service delivery and education.

== Research ==
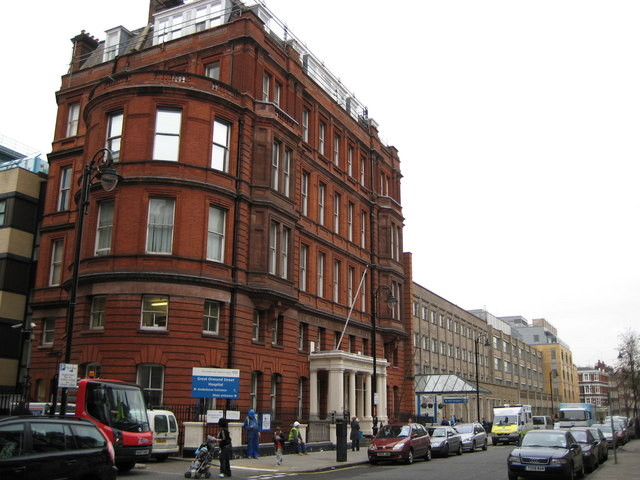
Great Ormond Street Hospital

According to the independent Thomson ISI Essential Science Indicators, which assesses organisations according to the number of highly cited publications produced, UCLPartners is ranked: first in the world for research into ophthalmology; second in the world (and first in Europe) for neuroscience; first in Europe for clinical medicine; and second in Europe for immunology.

UCLPartners’ research priorities are divided into the following 11 key programme areas:

- Infectious Diseases
- Neurological Disorders
- Eyes and Vision
- Cardiovascular Health
- Children's Health
- Women's Health
- Immunology and Transplantation
- Cancer
- Mental Health
- Oral Health
- Ear, nose and throat

== See also ==
- Healthcare in London
- Genomics England
- UCLH/UCL Biomedical Research Centre
- Medical Research Council
- Francis Crick Institute
