= UCLH Biomedical Research Centre =

Research institute in London

Coordinates: 51.525701°N 0.137434°W

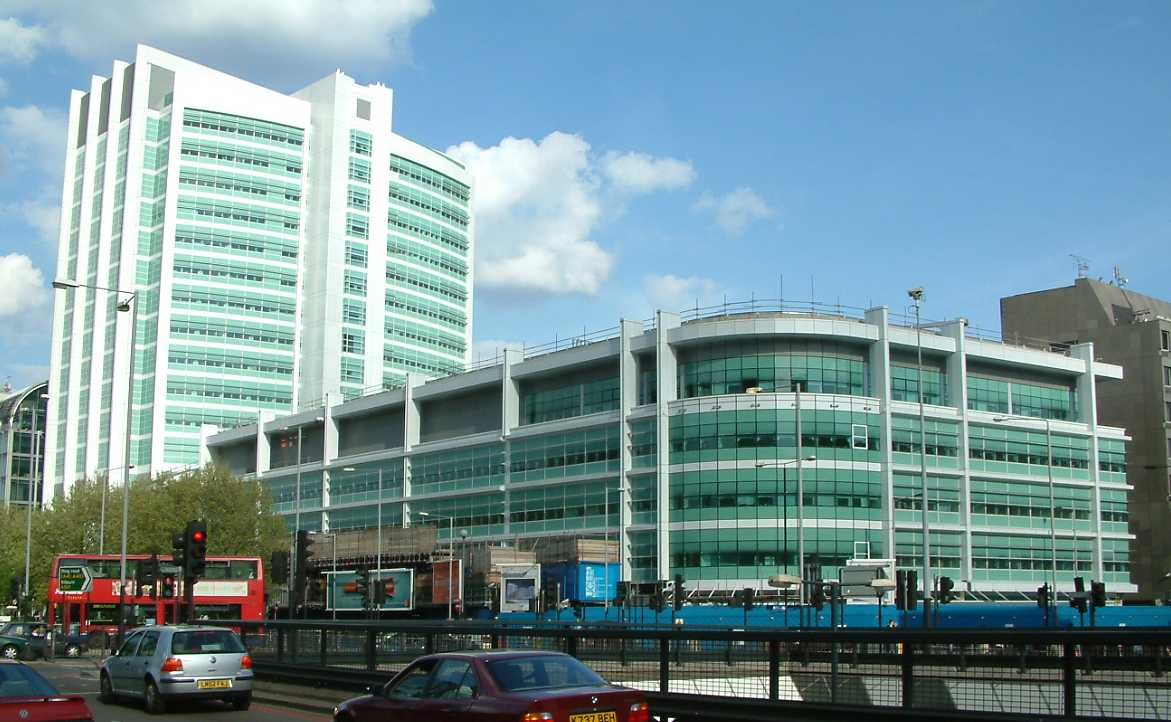
- Formation: 2007
- Purpose: Medical research
- Location: London, England
- Scientific Director: Professor Bryan Williams
- Affiliations: National Institute for Health and Care Research
- Website: www.uclhospitals.brc.nihr.ac.uk

The UCLH Biomedical Research Centre is a biomedical research centre based in London. It is a partnership between University College London Hospitals NHS Foundation Trust (UCLH), University College London (UCL) the National Institute for Health and Care Research (NIHR) and UCLPartners. It was one of the original five Comprehensive Biomedical Research Centres established by the NIHR in April 2007.

== History ==
Calls for expressions of interest in applying for Biomedical Research Centre status (either as a "Comprehensive" Biomedical Research Centre or a "Specialist" Biomedical Research Centre) were released by the National Institute for Health and Care Research in April 2006. All NHS providers in England were eligible to apply in collaboration with academic partners. UCLH and UCL made a joint application for Comprehensive Biomedical Research Centre status. An international expert selection panel then reviewed the pre-qualifying questionnaires and identified a shortlist, which included UCLH/UCL. Shortlisted candidates were then invited to submit full applications by 13 October 2006. The UCLH/UCL application was successful and the UCLH/UCL National Institute for Health and Care Research Comprehensive Biomedical Research Centre was established in April 2007.

In June 2009 the centre was part of a consortium that won £1.6 million from the Engineering and Physical Sciences Research Council to fund the engineering and commercialisation of multi-marker HIV smart chips for the rapid diagnosis and monitoring of HIV in resource-limited environments. A study co-funded by the centre was published in May 2010 which established that premature babies experience increased pain sensitivity for the rest of their lives.

In 2011 the centre was awarded a further £98 million funding from the NIHR.

In November 2012 it was announced that BRC-supported research had resulted in the discovery of a genetic mutation that increases the risk of developing Alzheimer's disease. In 2012 BRC researchers worked on the team which identified genetic mutations associated with dystonia. In November 2012 the world's first adolescent rheumatology research centre opened with BRC researchers leading the research agenda. In the same month, researchers from the BRC together with industry partners OJ-Bio were awarded £800,000 to develop a hand-held device that can diagnose patients at the early stages of HIV and give results within minutes.

In 2016, the BRC was awarded its third tranche: another £111 million in research funds from the NIHR, for the cycle beginning in April 2017. The original 11 BRC were now expanded to 20, but the UCHL/UCL BRC remained in the top three, the only ones awarded a three-figure grant.

== Organisation ==
The BRC Board is the executive decision-making body of the BRC and decides the allocation of its resources and oversees its programmes. Reporting to the Board are 16 research themes and the Wellcome Trust Clinical Research Facility. A Theme Management Team meets regularly to discuss new ideas and approaches and to foster collaborations across the centre.

The activities of the centre are also informed by the work of a Research Governance Committee and Research Finance Committee, as well as a Research Patients’ and Carers’ Support Network, Engagement Panel and Industry Advisory Panel.

== Activities ==
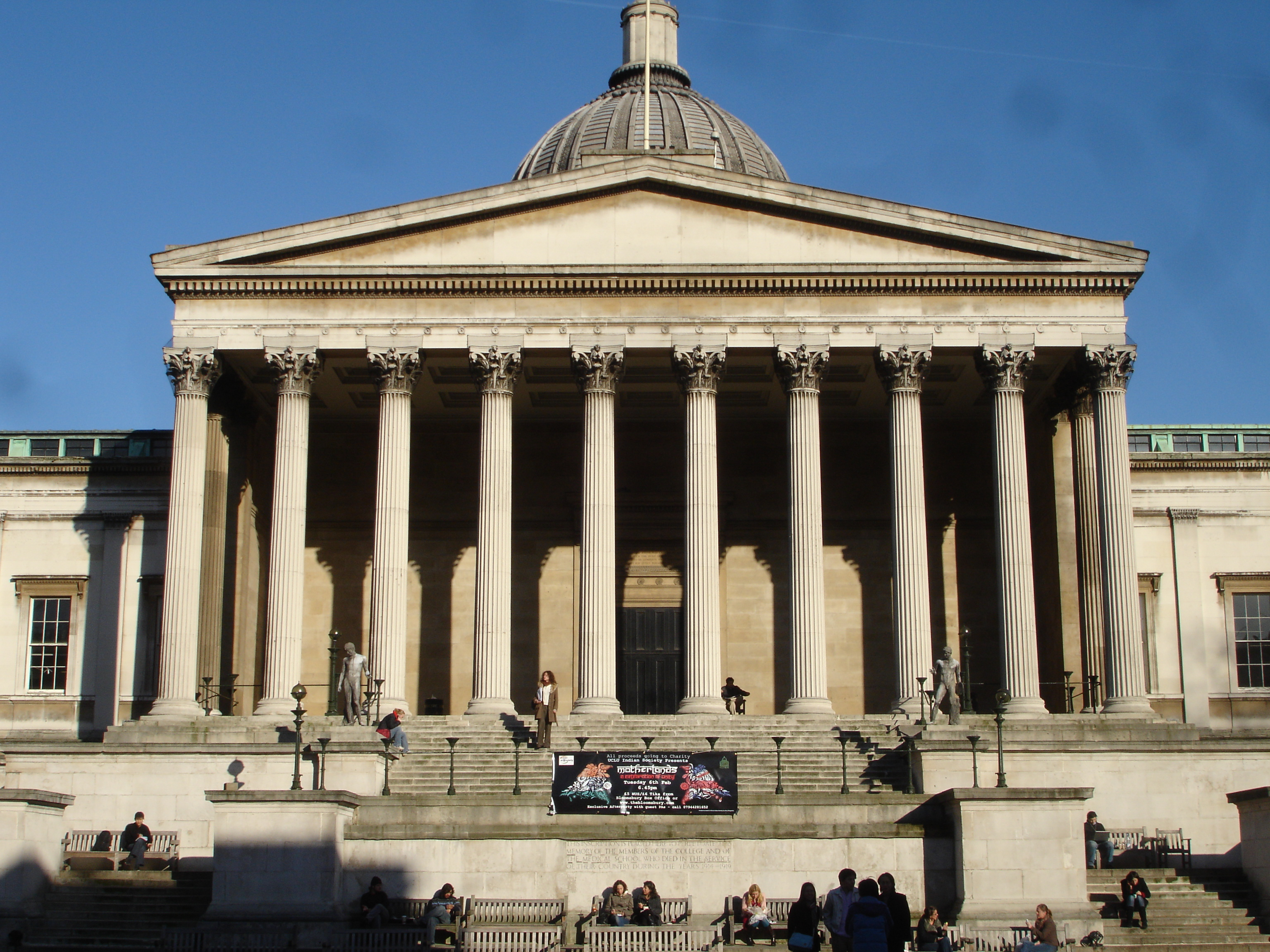
The main portico of University College London

The BRC's work focuses on translating fundamental biomedical research into clinical research into treatments and therapies that have a direct effect on patients. In particular the centre focuses on experimental medicine research projects, such as early phase human studies and studies looking at mechanisms in therapeutics (drug, immunological and cell based), diagnostics and medical technology. The BRC supports experimental medicine research projects by investing in staff posts, equipment, facilities and training.

The BRC's research activities are organised into four broad programmes:

- Cancer
- Cardiometabolism
- Infection, immunity and inflammation
- Neuroscience

In 2011, Department of Health (DH) analysis showed that the UCL and UCLH partnership generated 11% of all highly cited biomedical research papers produced in the United Kingdom.
