= Mary Reilly (academic) =

Irish neurologist

- Born: Belmullet, County Mayo, Ireland
- Education: University College Dublin
- Known for: Inherited neuropathies
- Scientific career
- Workplaces: National Hospital for Neurology and Neurosurgery

Mary M. Reilly is an Irish neurologist who works at National Hospital for Neurology and Neurosurgery. She studies peripheral neuropathy. She is the President of the Association of British Neurologists.

== Early life and education ==
Reilly studied medicine at University College Dublin, graduating in 1986. She worked for a few years as a neurologist at St. Vincent's University Hospital, before joining Anita Harding at the National Hospital for Neurology and Neurosurgery in 1991. Reilly has spoken of how much she admired her supervisor, and attributes her clinical interests to Harding. Reilly earned her medical doctorate in 1996, focussing on familial amyloid polyneuropathy. She completed her neurological training at Royal Free Hospital and Guy's Hospital, training with P. K. Thomas and Richard Hughes.

== Career ==
At the National Hospital for Neurology and Neurosurgery Reilly specialises in inherited neuropathies. She was made consultant neurologist in 1998 and a Fellow of the Royal College of Physicians in 2002. She began to study neuromuscular disease, in particular Charcot–Marie–Tooth disease. In 2004, she found that Vitamin C could be used to improve symptoms in mouse models of CMT1A (Charcot–Marie–Tooth disease type 1A). She established a randomized controlled trial with colleagues in Italy to evaluate the efficacy of Vitamin C on CMT1A. The UK part of the trial consisted of 50 participants, and found that whilst Vitamin C is safe, it does not slow the progression of the disease. Although the trial was not a success, it developed new neuropathy outcome measures. Her research includes the identification of genes such as BICD2 and methionyl-tRNA synthetase (MARS); she has already conducted functional analysis of IGHMBP2.

Reilly works with Muscular Dystrophy UK on muscle-wasting conditions. She has also worked on new biomarkers for disease progression. CMT parents suffer from damaged motor nerves, which results in muscles weakening, and ultimately allows fat to accumulate in muscles; MRI outcome measures could monitor intramuscular fat accumulation, and detect muscle water changes that preceded fat accumulation. Reilly identified that calf muscle fat friction maps are an outcome measure in patients with CMT1A, with calf muscle fat increased significantly in patients with CMT1A She received a $1,000,000 grant from the Muscular Dystrophy Association to evaluate MRI protocols for monitoring changes in muscles from CMT.

In 2010, Reilly was appointed Professor of Clinical Neurology at University College London. She leads the Division of Clinical Neurology and Medical Research Council Centre for Neuromuscular Diseases. With the MRC Centre for Neuromuscular Diseases and Muscular Dystrophy UK, Reilly runs an annual translational neuromuscular diseases meeting, which includes a patient day to discuss inherited neuropathies. Along with CMT, Reilly has worked on hereditary sensory and autonomic neuropathies and carpal tunnel syndrome in inherited neuropathies.

Reilly contributed to the 2013 Handbook of Clinical Neurology, and wrote a chapter for the 2016 Springer Publishing collection Neuromuscular Disease: Case Studies from Queen Square. Reilly has served as President of the British Peripheral Nerve Society and the International Peripheral Nerve Society. In 2015 she was appointed President-elect of the Association of British Neurologists. She became the first woman to take the role in 2017. Reilly was elected a Fellow of the Academy of Medical Sciences in 2020.
