= Anita Harding =

Irish-British neurologist

- Born: 17 September 1952
- Died: 11 September 1995 (aged 42)
- Education: King Edward VI High School
- Alma mater: UCL Medical School
- Occupation: Neurologist
- Known for: The first identification of a mitochondrial DNA mutation in human disease, and the concept of tissue heteroplasmy of mutant mitochondrial DNA
- Spouse: P.K. Thomas (m. 1977–1995)

Anita Elizabeth Harding (17 September 1952 – 11 September 1995) was an Irish-British neurologist, and Professor of Clinical Neurology at the Institute of Neurology of the University of London. She is known for the discovery with Ian Holt and John Morgan-Hughes of the "first identification of a mitochondrial DNA mutation in human disease and the concept of tissue heteroplasmy of mutant mitochondrial DNA", published in Nature in 1986. In 1985 she established the first neurogenetics research group in the United Kingdom at the UCL Institute of Neurology.

== Biography ==
Born in Ireland, Harding was educated at the King Edward VI High School for Girls and the Royal Free Hospital Medical School, where she qualified in 1975. She married neurology professor P.K. Thomas two years later, and trained as a neurologist. She pursued further clinical training at Hammersmith Hospital and the National Hospital for Neurology and Neurosurgery, and worked with laboratories in Cardiff and the United States to learn the burgeoning field of neurogenetics. In 1985, she established the first neurogenetics research group in the United Kingdom at the UCL Institute of Neurology (UCLIN) in Queen Square, London while still a lecturer at that institution. In 1986 she was a senior lecturer at the UCLIN; a position she held for nine years.

In 1988, Harding played an instrumental role in the establishment of the European Neurological Society. She died of colorectal cancer, 6 days before her 43rd birthday and shortly before she was to take up the chair in Clinical Neurology at the UCLIN. A person with great charm and wit, she referred to herself as the "wobbly doctor". On learning of her terminal condition, she is reported to have said "[A]t least I won't have to buy Windows 95".

In 1996, she was posthumously awarded the ABN Medal by the Association of British Neurologists. In 2019, the journal Nature named their custom typeface in her honor.

== Work ==
Harding made several significant contributions in the field of inherited neurologic disorders. Her major achievements were:

- Classification of the peripheral neuropathies and hereditary ataxias, the first identification of a mitochondrial DNA mutation in human disease (in Kearns–Sayre syndrome)
- Identification of trinucleotide repeats in degenerative neurologic diseases (e.g. Huntington's disease).

She also worked extensively on the population genetics of disorders with ethnic distribution. She published over 200 articles, and edited 3 books. Together with Dr. Mary Davis, Anita Harding established one of the biggest service labs for molecular analysis of neurogenetic disorders in the UK.
