= Martin Rossor =

British neurologist

Professor Martin Rossor FRCP FMedSci
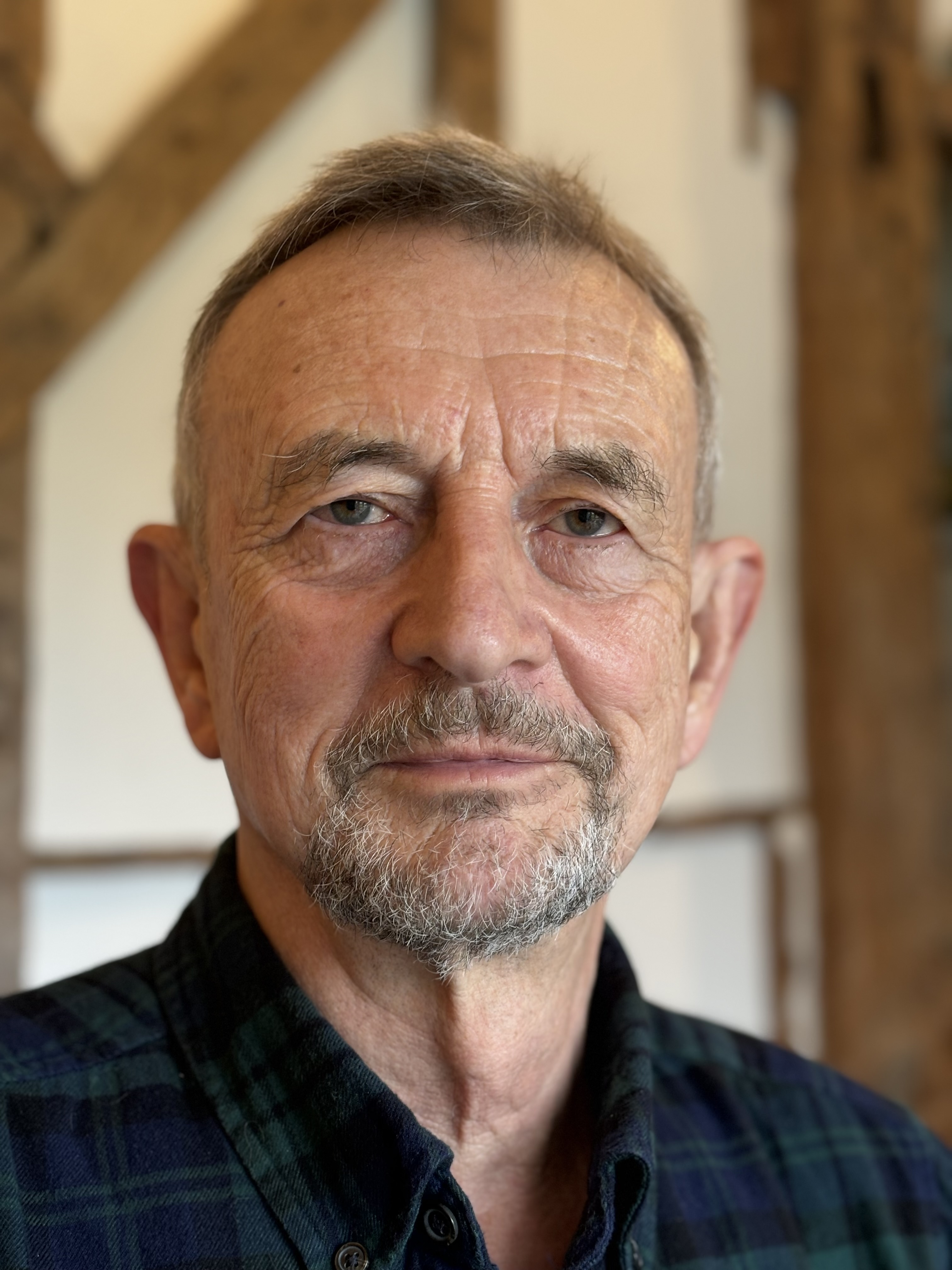

Professor of Neurology, University College London
- In office 1998–2015

Personal details
- Born: 24 April 1950 (age 76)
- Occupation: Neurologist

Martin Neil Rossor (born 24 April 1950) is a British clinical neurologist with a specialty interest in degenerative dementias and familial disease.

== Career ==
Martin Rossor is principal research associate at the UCL Queen Square Institute of Neurology, honorary consultant neurologist at the National Hospital for Neurology and Neurosurgery, honorary professor at Trinity College Dublin, and sits as faculty at the Global Brain Health Initiative. Until 2020, he was the National Director for Dementia Research for the National Institute for Health Research (NIHR) in the UK.

He was the editor of the Journal of Neurology, Neurosurgery, and Psychiatry, president of the Association of British Neurologists, director of the NIHR Clinical Research Network for Dementia and Neurodegenerative Diseases, and director of the NIHR Queen Square Dementia Biomedical Research Unit. Rossor was elected Master of the Worshipful Society of Apothecaries for 2018-2019.

In 2026, Rossor was ranked 19 in the UK and 113 internationally in the Research.com Ranking of Best Scientists in the Field of Neuroscience.

== Research ==
His collaborative work in identifying and characterising a large collection of familial cases of Alzheimer’s disease contributed to the discovery of mutations in the amyloid precursor protein gene.

His recent research focuses on general cognitive impairment in systemic disease and multimorbidity including development of the Cognitive Footprint concept, which he co-authored in 2015.

== Education and professional qualifications ==
Rossor attended Jesus College, Cambridge (1968-1971); and King's College, Hospital Medical School (1971-1974).

He holds a Bachelor of Medicine/ Bachelor of Surgery (1974); Master of Arts (1975); is a Member of the Royal College of Physicians (1976); Doctor of Medicine (1986); and Fellow of the Royal College of Physicians (1990). He was elected a Fellow of the Academy of Medical Sciences in 2002.

In 2022, he was elected a member of the Academia Europaea and more recently was awarded the 2025 Grand Prix Européen by the Fondation Recherche Alzheimer.

== Awards ==
- Bengt Winblad Lifetime Achievement Award in Alzheimer’s disease Research of the Alzheimer Association (2009)
- British Neuropsychiatry Association Medallist (2017)
- Association of British Neurology Medallist (2017)
- Grand Prix Européen (2025)

== Plenary and named lectures ==
- 1995 FE Williams Lecturer, Royal College of Physicians
- 1999 First McDonald Critchley Lecturer, World Federation of Neurology, London
- 2003 Science Today, Health tomorrow – Royal Institution of Great Britain, London
- 2008 Croonian Lecturer – Royal College of Physicians
- 2010 Plenary Lecture American Neurological Association
- 2012 Royal Society of Medicine Stevens Lecture for the Laity
- 2017 King's College London Institute of Gerontology David Hobman Lecture

== Publications ==
Rossor has authored over 900 publications. He has been on the Highly Cited Researcher list from Clarivate since 2018.
