= Dimitri Kullmann =

British neurologist

Dimitri Kullmann FRS FMedSci MAE
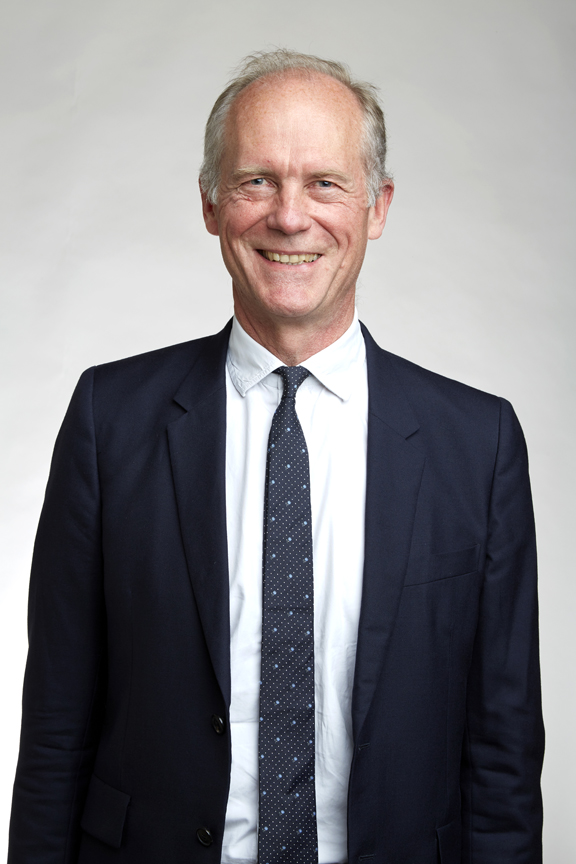
- Kullmann in 2018
- Born: Dimitri Michael Kullmann; 1958 (age 67–68); London, England
- Education: Lycée Français Charles de Gaulle
- Alma mater: University of Oxford
- Awards: Baly Medal (2017)
- Scientific career
- Fields: Neuroscience; Synaptic transmission; Channelopathies; Epilepsy
- Institutions: University College London; University of California, San Francisco; National Hospital for Neurology and Neurosurgery; UCL Institute of Neurology
- Thesis: Central actions of muscle receptors (1984)
- Doctoral advisor: Julian Jack
- Website: www.ucl.ac.uk/ion/research/synaptopathies/principal-investigators/dimitri-m-kullmann

Dimitri Michael Kullmann (born 1958) is a British neurologist who is a professor of neurology at the UCL Institute of Neurology, University College London (UCL), and leads the synaptopathies initiative funded by the Wellcome Trust. Kullmann is a member of the Queen Square Institute of Neurology Department of Clinical and Experimental Epilepsy and a consultant neurologist at the National Hospital for Neurology and Neurosurgery.

== Education ==
Kullmann was educated at the Lycée Français Charles de Gaulle and studied physiology at Balliol College, Oxford where he was awarded a Bachelor of Arts (BA) degree and a Doctor of Philosophy degree. He studied and trained at the University of Oxford and St Thomas's Hospital Medical School at the University of London. His postgraduate research was supervised by Julian Jack.

== Research and career ==
Kullmann's research investigates how synapses function in health and disease. His laboratory helped to show how neurotransmitters activate different receptor subtypes in and around synapses, and resolved some controversies about the mechanisms of long-term changes in synaptic strength. Genetic and autoimmune disorders of synaptic proteins (‘synaptopathies’) provide insights into the mechanisms of a broad range of neurological diseases including epilepsy and migraine. Together with his colleagues, Kullmann has used these insights to devise gene therapy strategies that could be used to treat intractable epilepsy.

The Kullmann lab has contributed to the discovery and elucidation of silent synapses, glutamate spillover, tonic inhibition, long-term potentiation in interneurons, neurological channelopathies and Synaptopathies, gene therapy for epilepsy, and mechanisms of neural oscillations. Kullmann served as the editor-in-chief of the scientific journal Brain between 2014 and 2020 and is on the editorial board of the journal Neuron. Before working at UCL, he did postdoctoral research with Roger Nicoll at the University of California, San Francisco.

=== Awards and honours ===
Kullmann was awarded the University Gold Medal in Medicine by the University of London, in 1986. and the Baly Medal by the Royal College of Physicians in 2017. He was elected a Guarantor of Brain in 2000, elected a Fellow of the Academy of Medical Sciences (FMedSci) in 2001, a Corresponding Fellow of the American Neurological Association in 2013, a member of the Academia Europaea (MAE) in 2017 and a Fellow of the Royal Society (FRS) in 2018. He was awarded the 2023 Basic Science Research Award by the American Epilepsy Society.
