= QS Enterprises Ltd. =

QS Enterprises Ltd in Queen Square, Central London is a wholly owned trading subsidiary of the University College London Hospitals Charity. It was the first health sector social enterprise of its kind in the United Kingdom and remains one of the few independent organisations working for the direct benefit of an NHS institution. Since 1985, QS Enterprises Ltd has donated in excess of £25 million to the Charity for the benefit of the hospitals that make up the University College London Hospitals NHS Foundation Trust.

QS Enterprises Ltd now operates across two divisions: Queen Square Imaging Centre which works in partnership with The National Hospital for Neurology and Neurosurgery in Queen Square, London, and the Chenies Mews Imaging Centre, a dedicated clinical and research cardiac Magnetic Resonance Scanner (MRI) facility on Chenies Mews, Central London

== History ==
QS Enterprises Ltd was formed on 24 September 1984 in order to fund the first MRI scanner for the National Hospital for Neurology and Neurosurgery in Queen Square. The new scanner provided valuable scanning capacity for NHS patients, as well as creating a reliable income stream for the hospital from the provision of a private patient service. Following the creation of the UCLH NHS Trust in 1994, QS Enterprises joined forces with the UCLH Charity, working as the United Kingdom's first health sector social enterprise. Grants made by the UCLH Charity from the profits donated from QS Enterprises Ltd have been used to fund a number of key developments around the UCLH Trust, including the Neuromuscular Complex Care Unit at the National Hospital for Neurology and Neurosurgery.
