= Helen Dimsdale =

British neurologist (1907-1977

Helen Easdale Dimsdale
- Born: 2 July 1907; Stretford, Lancashire, England
- Died: 20 April 1977 (aged 69)
- Education: Girton College, Cambridge; University College Hospital; University of Cambridge (M.B., B.Chir.); Elizabeth Garrett Anderson Hospital (M.A., M.D.)
- Spouse: Wilfrid Dimsdale
- Children: One
- Scientific career
- Fields: Neurology
- Workplaces: Elizabeth Garrett Anderson Hospital; Maida Vale Hospital for Nervous Diseases; Royal Free Hospital

Helen Dimsdale, née Brown (2 July 1907 – 20 April 1977), was a British neurologist who was not only the first woman appointed as a consultant at Maida Vale Hospital, she was the first to be named to a clinical neurological consultancy in Britain.

== Life ==
Helen Easdale Dimsdale was born on 2 July 1907 at Stretford, Lancashire, England, the daughter of John Harold Brown and his wife Ellen Carseto. Helen was first educated at Culcheth Hall and Hayes Court before moving on to attend Girton College, Cambridge where she took a first in the Natural Science Tripos in 1929.

She went to University College Hospital (UCH) for clinical studies where she received her M.B., B.Chir. degrees in 1937. She had house appointments at UCH and Elizabeth Garrett Anderson Hospital (EAGH) before she was appointed medical registrar at EAGH in 1938. Dimsdale trained throughout World War II at various hospitals in neuropathology until she became a consultant in 1946 at EAGH. The following year, she was appointed as a consultant at Maida Vale Hospital for Nervous Diseases and became the first woman to be appointed to a neurological consultancy in Britain. She was elected a Fellow of the Royal College of Physicians in 1949.

She received her M.A. and M.D. degrees in 1949. She published a number of useful papers and also became a consultant at the Royal Free Hospital in 1950. Dimsdale continued to work at Maida Vale and the Royal Free until ill-health forced her retirement in 1967.

She authored "an influential series of 320 cases classifying the clinical features of parkinsonism."

== Activities ==
Dimsdale was medical tutor at the Royal Free from 1951 to 1954 as well as teaching there and at the Institute of Neurology. She served as an "examiner in neurology for the Diploma of Psychological Medicine at Durham University and for the Royal College of Physicians in medical ophthalmology. Dimsdale proved her administrative abilities when she served as chairman of the planning committee for the new Royal Free Hospital in the 1950s and as treasurer for the Association of British Neurologists (1961–1966)."

== Personal life ==
She married Wilfrid Dimsdale in 1930. They had one son who became an economist and fellow of Queen’s College, Oxford. She died on 20 April 1977 in West Mersea, United Kingdom.
