= Sarah Tabrizi =

British neurologist and neuroscientist

Sarah Tabrizi CBE FRS FMedSci
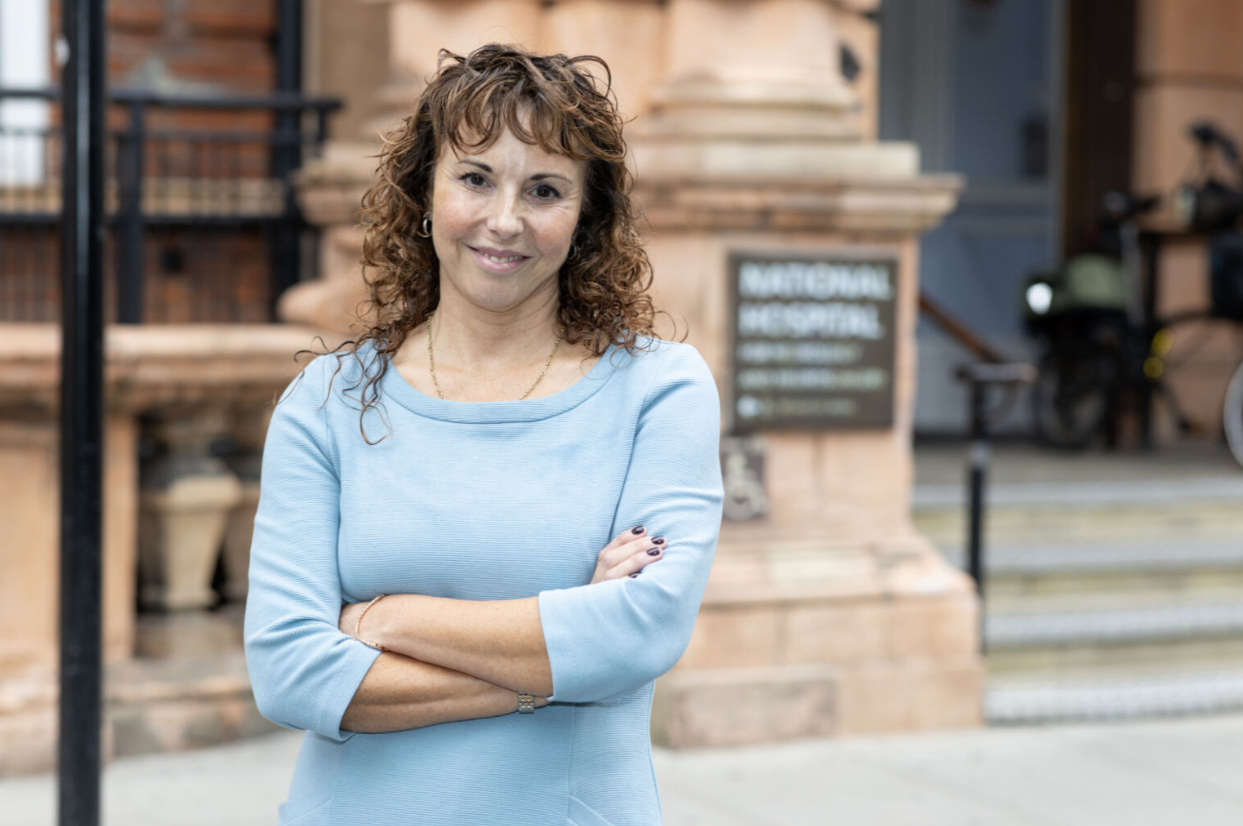
- Sarah Tabrizi in July 2024
- Born: London, UK
- Education: Heriot-Watt University; University of Edinburgh; University College London
- Known for: Research into neurodegeneration, particularly Huntington's disease
- Spouse: Michael Nath
- Awards: Fellowship of the Academy of Medical Sciences, 2014; MRC Millennium Medal, 2022; Fellowship of the Royal Society, 2024; National Academy of Medicine, 2024
- Scientific career
- Fields: Neuroscience
- Workplaces: UCL Institute of Neurology; National Hospital for Neurology and Neurosurgery
- Thesis: Mitochondrial dysfunction in the pathogenesis of neurodegeneration (2000)
- Website: https://www.ucl.ac.uk/ion/research/research-centres/hd-centre

Sarah Joanna Tabrizi CBE FRS FMedSci is a British neurologist and neuroscientist in the field of neurodegeneration, particularly Huntington's disease. She is a Professor and Joint Head of the Department of Neurodegenerative Diseases at the UCL Institute of Neurology; the founder and Director of the UCL Huntington's Disease Centre; a Principal Investigator at the UK Dementia Research Institute at UCL; and an Honorary Consultant Neurologist at the National Hospital for Neurology and Neurosurgery, Queen Square, London, where she established the Multidisciplinary Huntington's Disease Clinic. The UCL Huntington's Disease Centre was officially opened on 1 March 2017 by UCL President and Provost Michael Arthur.

== Education and career ==
Tabrizi graduated with a first-class degree in biochemistry from Heriot-Watt University in 1986 and an MB ChB degree from the University of Edinburgh in 1992, where she graduated with the Gold Medal (Ettles Scholar) for the most distinguished medical graduate. She obtained a PhD degree at University College London in 2000. During her time as a trainee neurologist at the National Hospital for Neurology and Neurosurgery (NHNN), Queen Square, Sarah worked for Professors Anita Harding and David Marsden, both of whom would make a lasting impression on her. She undertook an MRC Clinical Training Fellowship PhD degree studying mitochondrial dysfunction in neurodegeneration with Tony Schapira and Gillian Bates from 1996 to 1999 then obtained a Department of Health National Clinician Scientist Fellowship at the UCL Institute of Neurology in 2002 to work with John Collinge and Charles Weissmann on prion cell biology. She was promoted to UCL Clinical Senior Lecturer and Honorary Consultant Neurologist in 2003, to Reader in 2007 and Professor in 2009.

== Research ==
Tabrizi is distinguished for her work on mechanisms of cellular neurodegeneration. In particular, she is focussed on researching Huntington's disease, including; its mechanistic pathobiology, novel therapeutics, biomarkers, outcome measures and first in human clinical trials. Among her achievements, Tabrizi has identified key pathogenic mechanisms in cellular degeneration in prion disease, identified a key role for the innate immune system in the pathogenesis of Huntington's disease, published the first assay of the mutant HD protein, and designed and led two major, international, influential research initiatives, TRACK-HD and Track-On HD.

To date these studies have yielded fundamental new insights into the preclinical phase of neurodegeneration in Huntington's disease including identifying predictors of disease onset, progression, evidence of brain compensation and plasticity and neurobiological changes occurring twenty years before predicted disease onset, and her work established a battery of clinical trial outcome measures now being used in global clinical trials. In 2017, her work identified an important new genetic modifier of disease progression in Huntington's disease (MSH3, a mismatch repair protein), which has opened up new avenues of research into targeting DNA repair pathways as possible therapeutics for Huntington's disease. A major focus of her research now is to build understanding of how different DNA repair mechanisms are involved in modifying the development of Huntington's disease. This knowledge to develop novel therapeutic approaches that could stop, slow down or reverse the progression of the disease by targeting the somatic expansion of the CAG repeat tract.

Tabrizi gave a keynote presentation at the 2016 Google Zeitgeist Minds conference about her research, and the prospect of gene silencing for neurodegenerative disease. She was the global lead Clinical Investigator for the first clinical trial of a 'gene silencing' or huntingtin-lowering antisense oligonucleotide (ASO) drug in Huntington's disease patients. The announcement of the 'top line' results from the Phase 1b/2a safety trial in December 2017 received widespread national and international media coverage and was covered in features by BBC News, The Guardian and Nature. In May 2019 the full results were published in The New England Journal of Medicine.

The potential of antisense oligonucleotides to treat neurodegenerative diseases was reviewed by Tabrizi in Science in 2020. Tabrizi is currently working on several different approaches to treat Huntington's disease, including testing novel ASOs targeting MSH3 to slow CAG repeat expansion, allele-selective approaches to target mutant HTT only, and new gene therapy approaches targeting the mutant HD gene.

In 2020, Tabrizi published the first dataset collected from the Huntington's Disease Young Adult Study (HD-YAS), which is studying premanifest HD gene carriers approximately 24 years from predicted onset of clinical symptoms using advanced neuroimaging, detailed cognitive testing and biofluid collection. The cohort did not show any clinically meaningful functional impairment, yet there was evidence of elevated levels of neurofilament light protein, suggestive of very early neuronal damage, in those closest to expected symptom onset. HD-YAS will provide critical information on the very earliest signs of neurodegeneration, identifying a time at which a therapy could potentially be introduced to delay or even ultimately prevent the onset of clinical symptoms in HD. This approach has implications beyond HD, providing a model for disease prevention in neurodegeneration and this work continues to be of major interest in the Tabrizi lab.

In 2022, alongside colleagues at the HD Regulatory Science Consortium and CHDI, Tabrizi developed a novel staging framework, the Huntington's Disease Integrated Staging System (HD-ISS), that assesses the progression of disease from birth. Similar to the cancer staging system, the HD-ISS defines HD in four stages, from 0–3, and also biologically defines the disease as the presence of the HTT CAG repeat mutation. This will allow clinical trials much earlier in course of the disease process, and well in advance of when people show signs and symptoms of the disease, allowing the possibility of disease prevention in the future.

In 2025, Tabrizi led several landmark studies that significantly advanced the understanding and treatment development landscape for Huntington's disease. In a follow up study to her 2020 HD-YAS paper, Tabrizi and colleagues the Universities of Glasgow, Gothenburg, Iowa, and Cambridge published a pivotal study in Nature Medicine, establishing for the first time a direct link between somatic CAG repeat expansion measured in blood and early neurodegenerative brain changes in individuals decades before clinical symptom onset. The findings identified a critical window for preventative treatment and provided strong mechanistic support for targeting somatic CAG expansion as a therapeutic strategy.

In February 2025, Tabrizi led a major study published in Science Translational Medicine demonstrating that antisense oligonucleotide–mediated suppression of MSH3 (a key DNA mismatch repair protein) can safely and effectively reduce somatic CAG repeat expansion in human neurons and animal models. The work provided foundational evidence for MSH3‑targeted therapies as a promising disease‑modifying approach.

Later that year, in September 2025, Tabrizi served as lead scientific advisor on uniQure's AMT‑130 gene‑therapy trial, which reported the first statistically significant slowing of Huntington's disease progression in humans. High‑dose treatment was associated with a 75% reduction in disease progression over 36 months, alongside improvements in key clinical and biomarker measures. The announcement received widespread national and international media coverage, featuring as the BBC’s lead 18:00 story on 24 September, with other lead stories in The Times, The Guardian, The Telegraph, Nature and Time Magazine.

In December 2025, Tabrizi was recognised in Nature’s 10, the journal's annual global list of scientists who made the most significant impact that year, highlighting her central role in advancing gene‑targeted treatments and shaping the future of Huntington's disease therapeutics. That same month, Tabrizi was awarded the British Neuroscience Association's 2025 Outstanding Contribution to Neuroscience Award, honouring her pioneering leadership in translating genetic discoveries into clinical advances, foundational work shaping global Huntington's disease research frameworks, and longstanding contributions to understanding premanifest disease biology and therapeutic development.

Tabrizi was the subject of profile articles in The Lancet in 2012 and The Lancet Neurology in 2017, and was featured alongside Amanda Staveley in an article for the Sunday Times in 2025.

As of June 2026, Tabrizi had authored more than 425 publications, with more than 48,000 citations for her research. Her H-Index is 115 (Google Scholar).

== Awards and honours ==
- Commander of the Order of the British Empire (CBE) (2026)
- Outstanding Contribution to Neuroscience Award, British Neuroscience Association (2025)
- Featured in Nature's 10 list (2025)
- Elected to US National Academy of Medicine (2024)
- Elected Fellow of the Royal Society (2024)
- Arvid Carlsson Award from Lund University (2023)
- MRC Millennium Medal (2022)
- Huntington's Disease Society of America Outstanding Research Award (2022)
- Osler Medal and Lecture from the Association of Physicians of Great Britain and Ireland (2022)
- Alexander Morison Medal from the Royal College of Physicians of Edinburgh (2019)
- Yahr Award from the World Congress of Neurology (2019)
- Cotzias Award from the Spanish Society of Neurology (2018)
- NHS70 Women Leader award (2018)
- Seventh Leslie Gehry Brenner Prize for Innovation in Science awarded by the Hereditary Disease Foundation (2017)
- Elected Fellow of the Academy of Medical Sciences (2014)
- Member of the Wellcome Trust Expert Review Group on Cellular and Molecular Neuroscience (2013–2017)
- Associate editor, Journal of Huntington's Disease
- Elected Fellow of the Royal College of Physicians (2007)

== Personal life ==
Tabrizi lives in London with her husband, the author Michael Nath.
