= Dimsdale (disambiguation) =

Dimsdale is a suburb in Newcastle-under-Lyme, England.

Dimsdale also may refer to:

== Places ==
- Dimsdale, Alberta, Canada
- Dimsdale (Wishaw), Scotland

== People with the surname ==
- Dimsdale baronets, a title in the Baronetage of the United Kingdom.
- Helen Dimsdale (1907–1977), British neurologist.
- Robert Dimsdale (1828–1898), English banker and politician.
- Thomas Dimsdale (1712–1800), English physician, banker and politician.
- Jaten Collin Dimsdale (born 1992), also known pseudonymously as Teddy Swims, is an American singer-songwriter whose music blends genres including R&B, soul, country, and pop..
  - Baron Dimsdale, a title conferred on the physician by the Russian royal family.

== See also ==
- Dimmsdale, California, the fictional setting of The Fairly OddParents
- Arthur Dimmesdale, a fictional character in The Scarlet Letter by Nathaniel Hawthorne (1850)
