= P. K. Thomas =

British neurologist (1926–2008)

P. K. Thomas CBE, FRCP
- Born: Peter Kynaston Thomas; 28 June 1926; Swansea, Wales
- Died: 25 January 2008 (aged 81); Highgate, London, England
- Education: University College London
- Medical career
- Field: Neurology
- Institutions: University of London

Peter Kynaston "PK" Thomas CBE, FRCP (28 June 1926 – 25 January 2008) was a Welsh academic neurologist, author, teacher and administrator. From 1974 to 1991 he was Professor of Neurology at the University of London. He was a fellow of University College London and the Royal Society of Medicine, and was the recipient of the Medal of the Association of British Neurologists. Thomas was, at various times, the president of the Association of British Neurologists, the European Neurological Society, and the Peripheral Nerve Society.

== Early life and education ==
Thomas was born in Swansea, Wales, on 28 June 1926, to parents Heber Lesley Thomas and Beatrice Ida Carmmen. He attended the Bible College of Wales School (later renamed Emmanuel Grammar School) in Derwen Fawr, Swansea, where his former biology teacher described his essays as "succinct and attractive style of writing." Thomas later earned his Bachelor of Science and Bachelor of Medicine, Bachelor of Surgery degree from University College London. While there, he developed an interest in anatomy under the guidance of Professor John Zachary Young and together they investigated the structure and function of axons in fish. Thomas then spent his post-graduate training as a house physician at central London hospitals, including the National Hospital for Neurology and Neurosurgery. In 1957, he was appointed a Senior Registrar in Neurology at the National Hospital for Neurology and Neurosurgery, where he continued his investigation in peripheral nerve function. This led him to travel to Montreal, Canada, where he studied electron microscopy with J. David Robertson at the Montreal General Hospital and McGill University.

== Career ==
Upon returning to England, Thomas co-established an electron microscopy laboratory in the Maida Vale Hospital for Nervous Diseases with Michael Kidd. Thomas was specifically interested in researching diabetic neuropathy and Guillain-Barré syndrome. By 1969, he founded the department of neurology at the Royal Free Hospital and led research projects on degeneration of myelinated fibres and unmyelinated axons, vitamin E deficiency, and Friedreich's ataxia. His research at the Royal Free Hospital impressed and he was promoted to a Chaired position with University of London in 1974.

In 1982, Thomas was selected by the Guarantors of the peer-reviewed journal Brain to succeed Charles Phillips as editor. He also co-edited the text book Peripheral Neuropathy with Peter J. Dyck. During this time, Thomas helped form the Association of British Neurologists, which he later presided over, and was the recipient of the Medal of the Association of British Neurologists. He remained a Professor of Neurology until his mandatory retirement in 1991.

== Personal life ==
Thomas married his first wife, Mary Truscott Cox on 8 March 1952, and they had two sons together before her death. He met his second wife Anita Elizabeth Harding at the Royal Free Hospital and they married in 1977. Thomas died on 25 January 2008 while married to his third wife Nok Ponsford.
