= Michael G. Hanna =

British neurologist (born 1963)

Michael Hanna
- Born: Michael G. Hanna; 1963 (age 62–63); Leeds, Yorkshire, England
- Education: University of Manchester
- Scientific career
- Workplaces: University College London
- Thesis: Studies on the molecular genetics and molecular pathogenesis of the mitochondrial encephalomyopathies (1996)
- Website: orcid.org/0000-0003-0825-4075

Michael G Hanna (born 1963 in Leeds, England) is Director of the UCL Institute of Neurology, University College London and professor in clinical neurology and consultant neurologist at the National Hospital for Neurology and Neurosurgery, Queen Square, London, and also Director of the Medical Research Council (MRC) Centre for Neuromuscular Disease.

== Education ==
Hanna attended Lawnswood Comprehensive State High School in Leeds and undertook undergraduate training in medical biochemistry and medicine at the University of Manchester, graduating with honours in 1988.

== Career and research ==
He undertook postgraduate medical and neurological training at the Newcastle upon Tyne university teaching hospitals and at the John Radcliffe Hospital in Oxford and at the National Hospital for Neurology and Neurosurgery, Queen Square, London, London. He undertook neurological research training as an MRC clinical training fellow at the UCL Institute of Neurology, National Hospital for Neurology and Neurosurgery, Queen Square, London.

Hanna was appointed consultant neurologist to the National Hospital for Neurology and Neurosurgery, Queen Square, London, University College Hospital, NHS FT in 1998 and promoted to University College London professor of clinical neurology in 2006. He was clinical director of the National Hospital for Neurology and Neurosurgery from 2007 to 2012, the largest neurological disease hospital in the UK assessing over 130,000 patients per year. He commenced as Director of the UCL Institute of Neurology, Queen Square, London in 2012. The UCL Institute of Neurology is the largest neurological research institute in the UK with over 1400 research staff and students and an annual turnover of £81m. In 2019 the institute held £261m in active research grants from external funders including MRC and Wellcome

== Awards and achievements ==
National NHS England coordination of clinical services-in 2001 was central to setting up the NHS England Highly specialised service for rare neuromuscular diseases, which continues to this day, coordinating 4 centres in London, Oxford and Newcastle enabling accurate diagnosis and treatment in congenital muscular dystrophy, congenital myasthenia, limb girdle dystrophy and muscle channelopathies.

In 2006, he was a founding partner to establish the NHS England Highly Specialised services for mitochondrial diseases linking Newcastle Oxford and London centres which continues to this day.

In 2012, he led an audit across 10 NHS Trusts in the SE of England assessing over 700 patient episodes and provided evidence that 40% of unplanned emergency admissions for patients with Neuromuscular diseases were avoidable and would if extrapolated across the NHS would save >£40m per annum. He used this data to make a case with colleagues to set up a specialised Neuromuscular Complex Care Centre at UCLH and raised £2m through charity fund raising to build and open the NMCCC.

In 2008, Hanna established the MRC Centre for Translational Research in Neuromuscular Disease. This has transformed the experimental medicine landscape in the UK for neuromuscular diseases and enabled many natural history studies and clinical trials. It established a National biobank of >5000 patient samples for research and has supported the training of over 34 clinical and non clinical PhD students.

Hanna established and is Director of a new MRC International Centre for Genomic Medicine in Neuromuscular Diseases in 2019. This £5.5m strategic award links 14 centres in India, Turkey, South Africa, Zambia and Brazil to advance genomics for patients and establish an international fellowship training programme.

He was voted best clinical teacher by clinical medical students year 2000.

He has delivered many keynote lectures and memorial lectures worldwide including the UK, (Goulstonian Lectureship to the Royal College of Physicians in 2003 Goulstonian Lectures), and the prestigious Ian MacDonald Lecture.

He was elected a Guarantor of Brain in 2009, and a corresponding member of the American Neurology Association in 2010.

He delivered the Inaugural Chopra Oration to the Indian Academy of Neurology in Hyderabad in 2019.

He was elected to the Fellowship of the Academy of Medical Sciences (FMedSci) in 2019.
