= John S. Duncan =

British neurologist

John S. Duncan FMedSci
- Born: 1955
- Education: University of Oxford
- Occupations: Neurologist, medical doctor
- Employers: National Hospital for Neurology and Neurosurgery; UCL Queen Square Institute of Neurology (1989–); University College London
- Awards: Fellow of the Academy of Medical Sciences (2005)
- Website: www.uclh.nhs.uk/OURSERVICES/CONSULTANTS/Pages/ProfJohnDuncan.aspx

John S. Duncan is a British neurologist specialising in epilepsy. He is Professor of Clinical Neurology at University College London Institute of Neurology and Clinical Director of the National Hospital for Neurology and Neurosurgery at Queen Square, London.

== Education ==
John Duncan qualified from University of Oxford medical school, where he also obtained his medical doctorate.

== Career and research ==
He was elected a Fellow of the Royal College of Physicians of London in 1994, and Fellow of the Academy of Medical Sciences (FMedSci) in 2005. He received the LifeTime Achievement Award for Research of the American Epilepsy Society in 2004.

Notable positions:

- 1988 Professor of neurology at the Institute of Neurology (part of University College London).
- 2012-2018 Clinical director of the National Hospital for Neurology and Neurosurgery.
- 2001–2006 Head of the Department of Clinical and Experimental Epilepsy at the Institute of Neurology.
- 2001–2005 Chairman of the Diagnostic Methods Commission of the International League Against Epilepsy
- 2005–2008: President of the UK Chapter of International League Against Epilepsy.
- 2009–2012: Treasurer of the UK Chapter of International League Against Epilepsy.
- 2005 Ambassador for Epilepsy (International League Against Epilepsy and International Bureau for Epilepsy).

John Duncan has published extensively on various aspects of neurology and epilepsy but particularly on the structural and functional imaging of the brain. He is a frequent speaker at international conferences, and is a member of the editorial board of several specialist journals.
