= Ley Sander =

Brazilian neurologist

Josemir W. Sander, also known as Ley Sander, is a Professor of Neurology and Clinical Epilepsy, and the head of Department of Clinical and Experimental Epilepsy, at UCL Queen Square Institute of Neurology. He is also a Professor of Neurology at West China Hospital, Sichaun University in Chengdu, China.

He is a Consultant Neurologist at the National Hospital for Neurology and Neurosurgery, Queen Square London. He is the Medical Director of the Chalfont Centre for Epilepsy and of the Epilepsy Society in Buckinghamshire. Sander is the Director of Scientific Research at SEIN – Centre of expertise in epilepsy and sleep medicine in Heemstede, The Netherlands.

Sander was the Head of the World Health Organization Collaborating Centre for Research and Training in Neurosciences.

The last 10 years Sander is in the top of ExpertScape and has a h-index of 126 on Google Scholar.

Fellow of the European Academy of Medical Science.

The Academy of Medical Sciences has elected Ley Sander, amongst 59 other influential biomedical and health scientists, to its respected Fellowship, announced on May 18 2023.

The new Fellows have been elected to the Academy in recognition of their contributions to the advancement of biomedical and health science, forefront research discoveries, and translating developments into benefits for patients and wider society.

Fellows are drawn from institutions across the UK and their expertise ranges from molecular imaging to biostatistics to public health policy. They join a prestigious Fellowship of 1,400 researchers who are central to the Academy’s work. This includes providing career support to the next generation of researchers and contributing to the Academy’s policy work to improve health in the UK and globally.

== History ==
Ley Sander qualified in medicine in 1981 (Medico, Universidade Federal do Parana, Curitiba, Brazil) and then completed medical and specialist training in neurology in London at St Thomas Hospital and the UCLH National Hospital for Neurology and Neurosurgery.

Until 2018 he directed the WHO Collaborating Centre for Research and Training in Neurosciences in London and the WHO Collaborating Centre for Research, Training and Treatment of Epilepsy in Heemstede, in the Netherlands.

== Academic positions ==
Professor

UCL Institute of Neurology, London, Clinical and Experimental Epilepsy, London, United Kingdom

1 Jul 1999 - present

Director for Scientific Research

Stichting Epilepsie Instellingen Nederland, R&D Division, Heemstede, Netherlands

2 Jan 2007 - present

Head of Department

UCL Queen Square Institute of Neurology, Department of Clinical and Experimental Epilepsy, London, United Kingdom

3 Dec 2018 - present

Professor of Neurology

West China Hospital of Sichuan University, Department of Neurology, Chengdu, China

15 Oct 2019 - present

== Non-academic positions ==
Consultant Neurologist

University College London Hospitals NHS Foundation Trust, National Hospital for Neurology and Neurosurgery

Dec 1994 - present

Medical Director

Epilepsy Society, Chalfont Centre for Epilepsy

Feb 2012 - present

== Degrees, certifications, training ==
Degrees

- Doctor of Philosophy, University of London 1994
- Diploma, Universidade Federal do Parana 1981

Certifications

- Specialist Register: Clinical Neurology
- General Medical Council, London, United Kingdom, 6 May 1996 - present

Postgraduate training

- Specialist Training in Neurology: National Hospital for Neurology and Neurosurgery, London, United Kingdom1990 - 1994
- NeurologyResidency: Registrar in Neurology
- St Thomas' Hospital, Neurology, London, United Kingdom: Residency

== Fields of Research ==
- Clinical sciences
- Neurosciences
- Cognitive and computational psychology
- Biological psychology
- Health services and systems
- Public health
- Clinical and health psychology
