= David Marsden (disambiguation) =

David Marsden (1941–2026) was a Canadian radio broadcaster.

David Marsden may also refer to:

- C. David Marsden (1938–1998), British neuroscientist
- Dave Marsden (politician) (born 1948), American politician
- David Marsden, a character in Cold Feet
