= Albertine Winner =

British physician (1907–1988)

Dame Albertine Winner DBE
- Born: Albertine Louisa Wiener; 4 March 1907; Coulsdon, London, England
- Died: 13 May 1988 (aged 81); Wimbledon, London, England
- Occupations: Physician and administrator
- Known for: First deputy chief medical officer

Dame Albertine Louisa Winner DBE (4 March 1907 – 13 May 1988) was a British physician and medical administrator. After graduating from University College Hospital Medical School, Winner practised at the Elizabeth Garrett Anderson Hospital, the Mothers' Hospital in Clapton, and Maida Vale Hospital for Nervous Diseases.

During the Second World War, she enlisted in the Royal Army Medical Corps, where she later served as the consultant to the Auxiliary Territorial Service. After the war, Winner served in the Department of Health as its first female deputy chief medical officer. In later life, she worked with Cicely Saunders in forming the first modern hospice at St Christopher's Hospice in Sydenham, London. In 1967, Winner was appointed as Dame Commander of the Order of the British Empire (DBE). Winner was also elected as president of the Medical Women's Federation in 1971. She died on 13 May 1988 in London.

== Early life and education ==
Albertine Louisa Wiener, an only child, was born in Coulsdon, London to Isidore Wiener and Annie Stonex. Her father was a Dutch-Jewish hide merchant from Venlo, Limburg, and her mother was British. In 1918, Isidore changed the family surname to Winner.

She attended Francis Holland School, a private girls' school at Clarence Gate in London. During her time there she was elected as head girl. Winner gained a Bachelor of Science Honours degree in physiology from University College London. She also played for the university's tennis team. Winner then studied medicine at the University College Hospital Medical School, graduating in 1933 with the University of London Gold Medal. She was the first female student to win the medal. She followed this with an MD in 1934, and the next year she became a Member of the Royal Colleges of Physicians of the United Kingdom (MRCP).

== Career ==
=== Physician and administrator ===
After qualifying, Winner worked at the Elizabeth Garrett Anderson Hospital, the Mothers' Hospital in Clapton, and the Maida Vale Hospital for Nervous Diseases. She developed an interest in neurology through the guidance of Sir Francis Walshe. Another important mentor early in her career was Sir Thomas Lewis.

In 1940, during the Second World War, she joined the Royal Army Medical Corps (RAMC), where she was promoted to the rank of lieutenant colonel. Winner was the Assistant Medical Director-General and the chief woman doctor of the Auxiliary Territorial Service (ATS). She was appointed an Officer of the Order of the British Empire (OBE) in the 1946 New Year Honours for her wartime service. Winner also later served as the honorary consultant to the ATS from 1946 to 1970. After the end of the war and on the eve of the emergence of the National Health Service, Winner joined the Department of Health in 1947 as its first female deputy chief medical officer, a position she would serve in for the next twenty years. Throughout her career, she was interested in the treatment of the chronically sick, as well as a general interest in the welfare of patients.

In 1959, she became a fellow of the Royal College of Physicians. Between 1965 and 1968, she was an honorary physician to the Queen. In the 1967 New Year Honours, Winner was appointed as Dame Commander of the Order of the British Empire (DBE). She was also appointed as the Linacre Fellow of the Royal College of Physicians, a position she held from 1967 to 1978. While serving in the position, Winner played a key role in developing postgraduate medical training posts for the Joint Committee on Higher Medical Training.

=== Later career and the hospice movement ===
After retiring from the medical profession in 1967, Cicely Saunders asked for her financial assistance in establishing the first modern hospice. Winner was initially apprehensive but soon saw its importance and helped establish St Christopher's Hospice in Sydenham, London, and she supervised its construction served as its deputy medical director when it opened in 1967. She provided guidance based upon her interest in patients' welfare and clinical experience. She utilised her interest and experience treating neurological disorders to develop palliative treatment of motor neuron disease. Winner later became its chairman in 1973, and president in 1985. She was also on the council of the charity Disabled Living Foundation, vice-president of the Medical Defence Union, served as the president of the Medical Women's Federation between 1971 and 1972 and became a fellow of the Faculty of Community Medicine (now Faculty of Public Health) in 1974.

== Personal life ==
Interested in art, she collected valuable Japanese prints. Her other interests included travel, sport, and opera. She considered herself a "sympathetic agnostic" when she joined the Christian foundation of St Christopher's. In her later years, she returned to the Jewish faith of her father.

She died on 13 May 1988 at the Lancaster Lodge nursing home in Wimbledon, London at the age of 81.
