= Michael Nath =

British author and academic

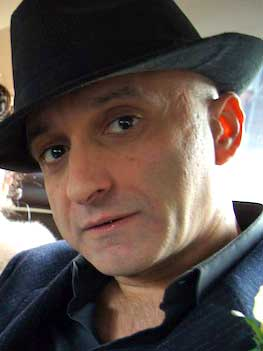
- Michael Nath in London, November 2011
- Occupations: Novelist and academic
- Spouse: Sarah Tabrizi
- Writing career
- Genre: Fiction
- Subjects: Modernism, creative writing
- Notable works: La Rochelle (2010), British Story: A Romance (2014)
- Notable awards: James Tait Black Memorial Prize (shortlisted 2011)
- Website: Nath's website Michael Nath at University of Westminster

Michael Nath is a British author and academic in the field of English Literature. His first novel, La Rochelle (2010), was shortlisted for the 2011 James Tait Black Memorial Prize for Fiction. His second, British Story: A Romance (2014), was a Morning Star Book of the Year. It was described by The Times Literary Supplement as "a wonderful exercise in novelistic virtuosity, strange and beautiful." His most recent novel, The Treatment, (Quercus, 2020), was a critical success: The Guardian (Michael Donkor: "it is the voices and the language that make this novel such a triumph"); iPaper (Sarah Hughes: "His writing is addictive, sometimes strange, often beautiful"); Arts Desk ("A London novel to join the greats"); Morning Star (Paul Simon: "beautifully vulgar"); Tablet (hailed by AN Wilson: "Some of the most interesting dialogue I’ve read in years … a fantastic book"); Metro (Anthony Cummings: "a maverick project that defies comparison").

In The Guardian, David Peace selected it as "The Book I Wish I’d Written". Ardal O’Hanlon recently selected it as a favourite novel (Hatchards Q&A).

It was also one of iPaper's, the 40 Best Books of 2020; a Daily Telegraph Best Crime Novel of 2020; Novel of the Year in the Morning Star; a Best Book of 2020, Arts Desk; and Sunday Times Crime Club Paperback of the week.

The Treatment has acquired a reputation: "Publishers should be less risk-averse. Look at […] The Treatment by Michael Nath; if novels are going to survive, novelists have a responsibility to push the boundaries." [David Peace]

Nath is presently working on a novel about The Fall.

Nath is a Senior Lecturer at the University of Westminster, London specialising in modernism and creative writing; his work has been featured by the Tate Gallery.

Nath lives in London with his wife, the neuroscientist Sarah Tabrizi.
