= Leonard Guthrie =

British physician (1858–1918)

- Born: Leonard George Guthrie; 7 February 1858; Kensington, London, England
- Died: 24 December 1918 (aged 60)
- Education: Magdalen College, University of Oxford
- Occupation: Paediatrician

Leonard George Guthrie FRCP (7 February 1858 – 24 December 1918) was an English physician and paediatrician to the Paddington Green Children's Hospital in London and was also associated with the Hospital for Epilepsy and Paralysis in Maida Vale, London.

== Early life ==
Guthrie was born on 7 February 1858, in Kensington, London, the second son of Thomas Anstry Guthrie and his wife Augusta Amherst. His brother was the novelist and journalist Thomas Anstey Guthrie (1856–1934). His basic education was at King's College School after which he read classics at Magdalen College, University of Oxford. He acquired his master's degree in 1880.

== Medical career ==
Guthrie completed his medical studies at St Bartholomew's Hospital in 1886 and subsequently sat the diplomas of both the Royal College of Surgeons and the Society of Apothecaries. He obtained his MD from Oxford in 1893 and became a fellow of the Royal College of Physicians in 1900.

He went on to become senior physician to the Paddington Green Children's Hospital and was subsequently associated with the Hospital for Epilepsy and Paralysis in Maida Vale.

=== Medical writing ===
Guthrie's major work was Functional Nervous Disorders of Childhood (1907), and he added chapters to Clifford Allbutt's, A System of Medicine (1896–1899; 1905–1911), and to the Diseases of Children (1913), edited by Archibald Edward Garrod, Frederick Eustace Batten and James Hugh Thursfield. He contributed articles to the Dictionary of National Biography 1912 supplement on the physicians Charles Edward Beevor and George Alfred Carpenter. He was secretary of the Royal College of Physicians committee that revised the Nomenclature of Diseases (5th edition 1917). He was president of the Harveian Society.

In 1907 and 1908, he gave the Fitzpatrick Lecture to the Royal College of Physicians on "Contributions to the Study of Precocity in Children" and "The History of Neurology". The lectures were privately printed in 1921 after his death by his nephew, Eric G. Millar.

In 1913, Guthrie reviewed the evidence relating to Napoleon Bonaparte's health towards the end of his life in an article for The Lancet. He did not dispute the conventional view that Napoleon died from stomach cancer, and probably had hepatitis too, but argued that his post-mortem remains also showed evidence of hypopituitarism (dystrophia adiposo-genitalis) such as genital atrophy, sexual alopecia, and skeletal and tissue changes that gave a feminine appearance.

== Death ==
According to a report in The Times, on Christmas Eve 1918, following a consultation in the afternoon, Guthrie had visited a friend in Notting Hill Gate. He left at 5.30 pm to travel home by Tube but, walking too close to the platform edge, he was killed when he was hit by a train as it entered the station. He was buried at Kensal Green Cemetery. He never married.

== Selected publications ==
- "Chronic Interstitial Nephritis in Childhood: A Paper Read Before the Harveian Society of London on Nov. 19th, 1896", The Lancet, 27 February & 13 March 1913.
- Interstitial Nephritis in Childhood. London, 1897.
- Hospital Sketches. Grant Richards, London, 1902. (as Lucas Galen)
- Functional Nervous Disorders in Childhood. Henry Frowde, Hodder & Stoughton, Oxford University Press, London, 1907.
- Did Napoleon Bonaparte Suffer from Hypopituitarism (Dystrophia Adiposo-genitalis) at the Close of His Life?, The Lancet, 13 September 1913.
- Contributions to the Study of Precocity in Children: The Fitzpatrick Lectures on the History of Medicine Delivered at the Royal College of Physicians in the Years 1907, 1908. Millar, 1921.
