= Julius Althaus =

German-English physician

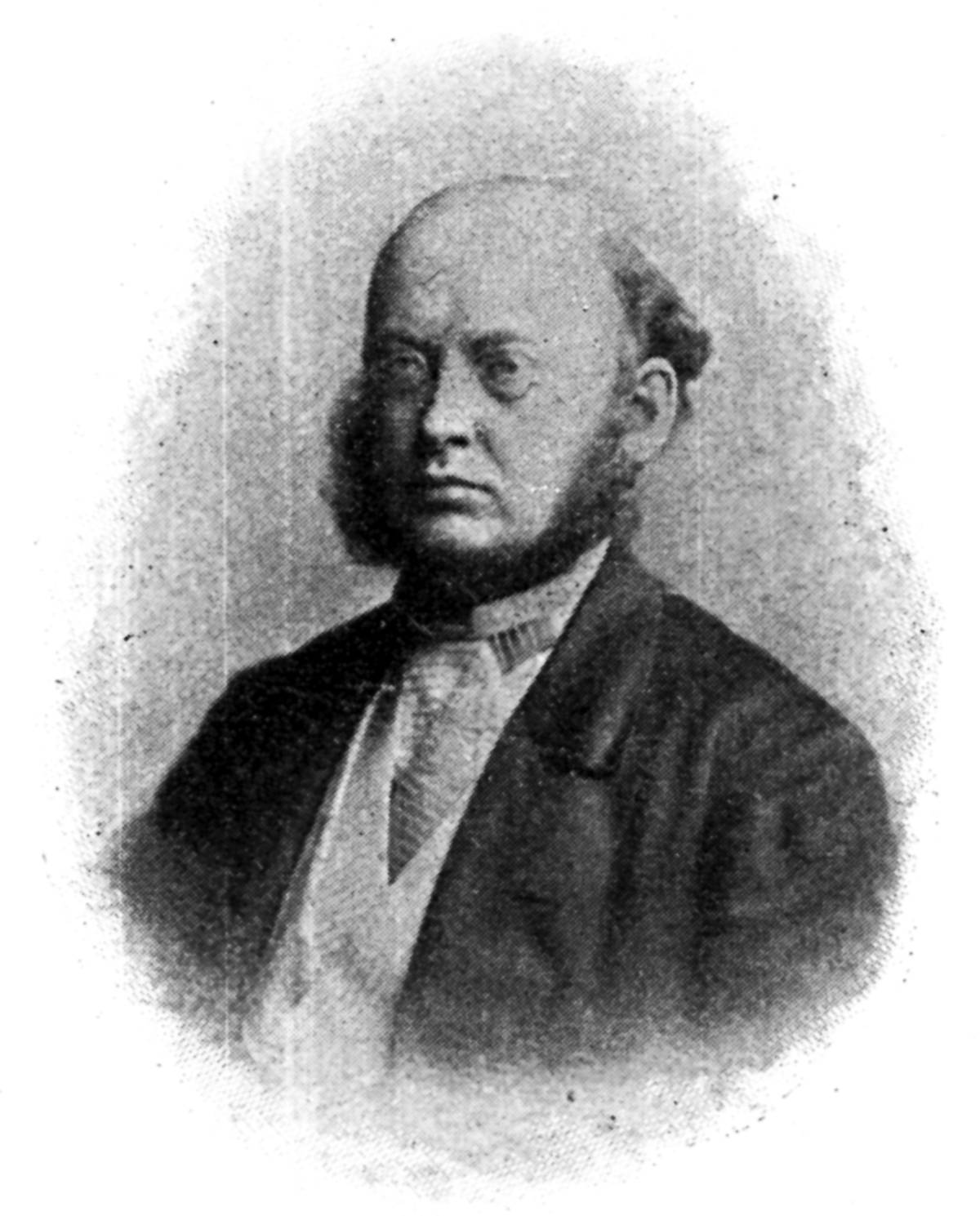
- Born: Julius Althaus; 31 March 1833; Lippe-Detmold
- Died: 11 June 1900 (aged 67); London
- Occupation: Physician
- Spouse: Anna Wilhelmina Pelzer
- Children: 3
- Parent(s): Georg Friedrich Althaus (father); Julie Draeseke (mother)
- Relatives: Caroline Elisabeth Althaus (sister); Theodor Althaus (brother); Friedrich Althaus (brother); Bernhard Althaus (brother)

Julius Althaus (31 March 1833 – 11 June 1900) was a German-English physician. He conducted early electrical treatment of patients at King's College Hospital and he was mainly instrumental in creating the Maida Vale Hospital for Nervous Diseases.

== Biography ==
Born in the Principality of Lippe, on 31 March 1833, Althaus was the fourth and youngest son of Friedrich Althaus and Julie Draescke. His father was general superintendent of Lippe-Detmold, a Protestant dignity equal to the Anglican rural dean; his mother was a daughter of the last Protestant bishop of Magdeburg. He received his classical education at the University of Bonn, and began his medical studies at Göttingen in 1851 continuing in Heidelberg and graduated M.D. at Berlin in 1855, with a thesis de Pneumothorace. He then visited Sicily with Professor Johannes Peter Müller to study zoology. He worked under Professor Jean Martin Charcot in Paris.

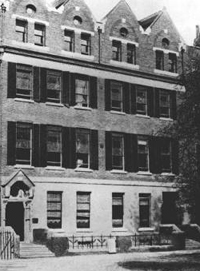
National Hospital for the Paralysed and Epileptic

Althaus moved to London, where, as an assistant to Robert Bentley Todd, he carried out the treatment of patients at King's College Hospital using electricity. In 1866, he was largely responsible for creating the Hospital for Epilepsy and Paralysis. This facility in Regent's Park later became the Maida Vale Hospital for Nervous Diseases and it is now part of National Hospital for Neurology and Neurosurgery. In 1877, Althaus unsuccessfully tried to rename the disease multiple sclerosis "Charcot's disease" after the disease's first descriptor, Jean-Martin Charcot. He gave two lectures on spinal cord sclerosis in 1884 and noted that the meaning of the term "sclerosis" varied from country to country.

Althaus was the physician at the Hospital for Epilepsy and Paralysis until 1894, when he was appointed to the honorary office of consulting physician. Althaus married Anna Wilhelmina Pelzer in June 1859, and had two sons and a daughter, of whom the latter survived him. He was admitted a member of the Royal College of Physicians of London in 1860. At the time of his death he was a corresponding fellow of the New York Academy of Medicine, and he was awarded the Order of the Crown of Italy. He died in London on 11 June 1900 as the result of damaging his knee in Switzerland on holiday the year before which was complicated by gout, followed by gastroenteritis and peritonitis.

Althaus and his wife were the centre of a social circle and they were both musically talented. Althaus has been called a cultural polymath and he was a talented linguist which allowed him to understand the latest developments in neurology on an international basis. He was greatly interested in the therapeutic effects of electricity.

== Works ==
Following Althaus' death, an obituarist described him as "a voluminous writer, and published many books and papers on various aspects of nervous disease." A modern biography called this an understatement, acknowledging his works in the wider field of medicine throughout his lifetime. Some of his works include:

- A treatise on medical electricity, theoretical and practical, and its use in the treatment of paralysis, neuralgia, and other diseases, 1859.
- The spas of Europe, 1862.
- On paralysis, neuralgia, and other affections of the nervous system: and their successful treatment by galvanisation and faradisation, 1864.
- On epilepsy, hysteria and ataxy; three lectures, 1866.
- Diseases of the nervous system, their prevalence and pathology, 1877.
- On infantile paralysis and some allied diseases of the spinal cord: their diagnosis and treatment, 1878.
- Functions of the brain; a popular essay, 1880.
- On failure of brain power: its nature and treatment, 1882 (5 editions).
- On sclerosis of the spinal cord: including locomotor ataxy, spastic spinal paralysis, and other system-diseases of the spinal cord: their pathology, symptoms, diagnosis, and treatment, 1885, translated into German, Leipzig, 1884, and into French by J. Morin, with a preface by Prof. Charcot, Paris, 1885.
- Influenza: its pathology, symptoms, complications, and sequels; its origin and mode of spreading; and its diagnosis, prognosis, and treatment, 1892.

== Sources ==
- This article incorporates text from a publication now in the public domain: Lee, Sidney, ed. (1901). "Althaus, Julius". Dictionary of National Biography (1st supplement). London: Smith, Elder & Co.
