= Julian Jack =

New Zealand physiologist (born 1936)

Julian Jack FMedSci FRS
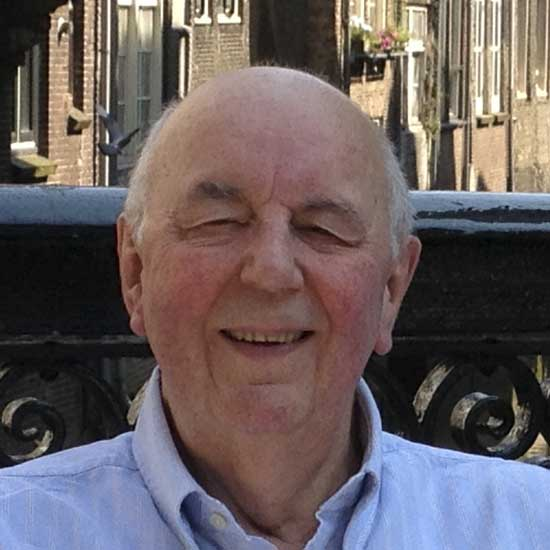
- Born: James Julian Bennett Jack; 25 March 1936 (age 90); Invercargill, New Zealand
- Education: University of Otago (MMedSci, PhD); University of Oxford (BM, MA)
- Awards: Rhodes Scholarship
- Scientific career
- Fields: Anatomy; Physiology; Neuroscience
- Institutions: University of Oxford
- Thesis: Inhibition and excitation in the mammalian spinal cord (1960)
- Doctoral students: David Attwell; Michael Hausser; Dimitri Kullmann; Richard W. Tsien

James Julian Bennett Jack (born 25 March 1936) is a New Zealand physiologist.

== Education ==
Jack graduated from the University of Otago with a PhD in 1960. After his PhD, Jack was awarded a Rhodes Scholarship in 1960 from Magdalen College, Oxford where he was awarded Master of Arts and Bachelor of Medicine degrees in 1963.

== Career and research ==
Jack's research specializes in cellular neuroscience.

His research concerns how nerve cells, or neurons, communicate with one another in the nervous system. Furthermore, how chemical and electrical signals move through neural networks, such as the spinal cord or cerebral cortex. Although neurons form large networks, these cells do not actually touch each other. Instead, when the end of a nerve is activated it releases ions or chemicals known as neurotransmitters. Subsequently, these move across the gap, or synapse, between the neuron and the adjacent cell in the network, activating its receptors and perpetuating the signal. Jack applies theoretical and experimental approaches to research this process of synaptic transmission. This includes the use of neurophysiology methods to record bioelectrical activity and mathematical models to analyse the central and peripheral nervous systems. His work on neurotransmission is offering insight into disorders of the nervous system, such as Alzheimer's disease and multiple sclerosis, and has the potential to improve their diagnosis.

Jack was a Lecturer and Reader at University Laboratory of Physiology at the University of Oxford. His former doctoral students include David Attwell, Michael Hausser and Dimitri Kullmann.

== Awards and honours ==
Jack was elected a Fellow of the Royal Society (FRS) in 1997 and a Fellow of the Academy of Medical Sciences (FMedSci) in 1998.
