= John Rothwell (physiologist) =

British neurophysiologist (born 1954)

John C. Rothwell
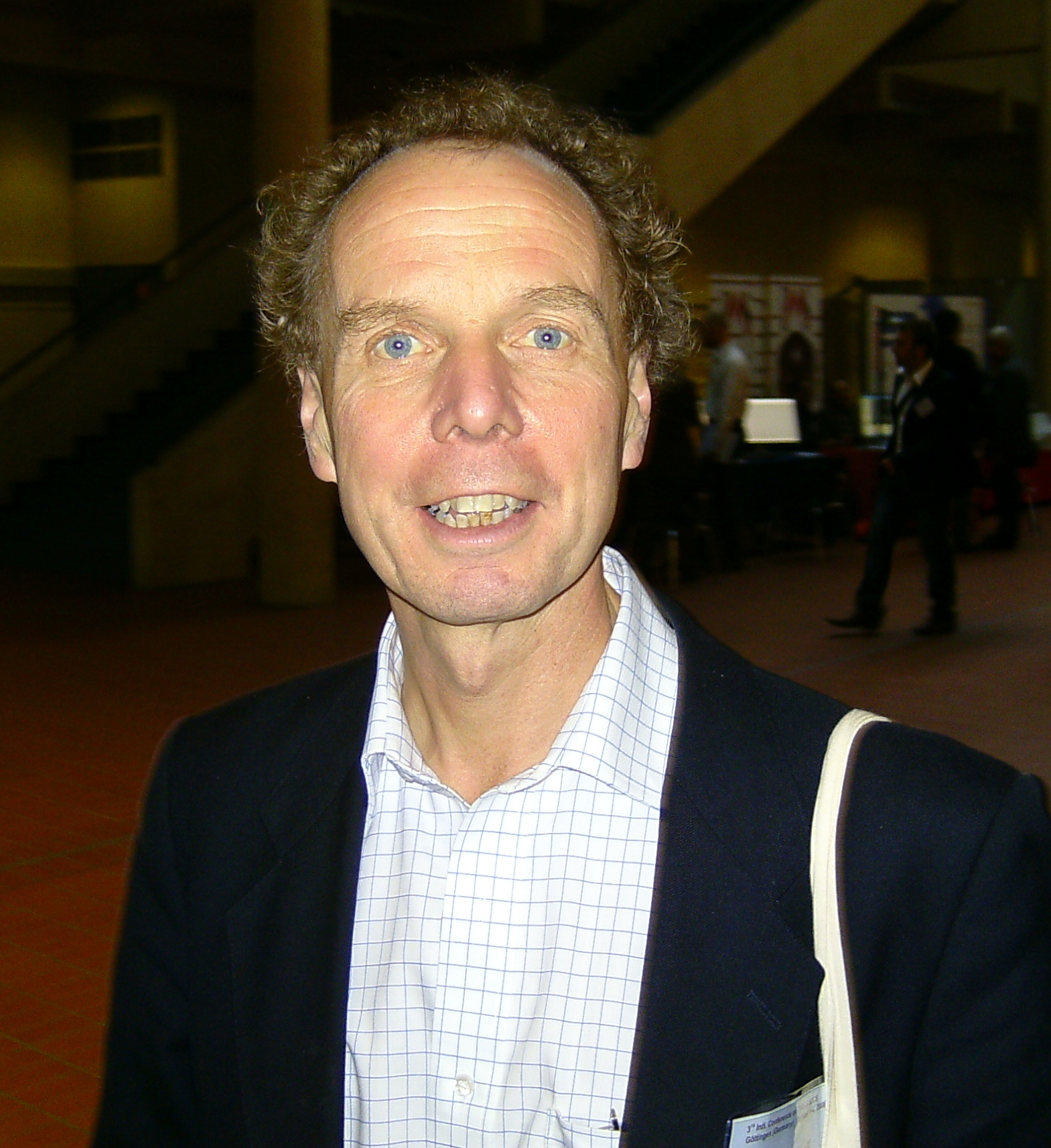
- John Rothwell at the Third International Conference on Transcranial Magnetic and Direct Current Stimulation in Göttingen, 2008
- Born: 1954 (age 71–72)
- Education: University of Cambridge (BA), King's College London (PhD)
- Scientific career
- Fields: Neurophysiology
- Workplaces: University College London
- Thesis: The function of the human long-latency stretch reflex (1980)
- Doctoral advisor: C David Marsden
- Website: www.ion.ucl.ac.uk/departments/sobell/Research/JRothwell

John C. Rothwell (born 1954) is a Professor of neurophysiology at the UCL Institute of Neurology. His main area of interest is transcranial magnetic stimulation and motor control.

== Education ==
Rothwell was educated at the University of Cambridge. He completed his PhD at King's College London in 1980 which supervised by David Marsden.

== Career and research ==
His group has pioneered the use of the paired-pulse technique (Kujirai et al. 1992), interhemispheric studies (Ferbert et al. 1992).

Rothwell was appointed head of the Medical Research Council (MRC) Human Movement and Balance Unit after the untimely death of David Marsden. He has written over 400 papers and numerous chapters. He was elected a Fellow of the Academy of Medical Sciences in 2004.
