= Paul Polani =

Italian-Austrian geneticist

Paul Emanuel Polani FRCP, HonFRCP(Ire), FRCPCH, FRCOG, HonFRCPath, DCH, FRS
- Born: 1 January 1914; Trieste, then Austria-Hungary, now Italy
- Died: 18 February 2006 (aged 92)
- Education: University of Siena
- Occupations: Geneticist and surgeon
- Known for: Development of medical genetics
- Spouse: Nina Sullam
- Awards: Baly Medal (Royal College of Physicians)
- Scientific career
- Institutions: Evelina Children's Hospital, King’s College, London, Guy's Hospital Medical School

Paul Emanuel Polani (1914–2006) was an Italian-Austrian geneticist, described by the Royal College of Physicians as "one of the key figures in the development of medical genetics".

== Life ==
Polani was born in Trieste, on 1 January 1914, the son of the son of Elisabetta, née Zennaro, and Enrico Polani. He trained in Italy and moved to the United Kingdom to study in 1939. At the outbreak of World War II he was interned, before being released and allowed to practise as a medical officer at Evelina Children's Hospital.

From 1960 to 1982 he worked at King’s College, London and Guy's Hospital Medical School, where he was Prince Philip's Professor of Paediatric Research and Director of the Paediatric Research Unit (later the Division of Genetics and Development

He was a Fellow of King's College London, and a Research Professor Emeritus at London University.

He received the Royal College of Physicians' Baly Medal in 1985, and delivered the Langdon Brown memorial lecture in 1984 and the Harveian Oration in 1988.

The genetic research library at Guy's Hospital was renamed in his honour in 1982.

He was appointed a Fellow of the Royal Society (FRS) in 1973.

He died on 18 February 2006.
