= C. David Marsden =

British neurologist (1938–1998)

David Marsden
- Born: Charles David Marsden; 14 April 1938; Croydon, London, England
- Died: 29 September 1998 (aged 60)
- Known for: Neurology – movement disorders
- Awards: Fellow of the Royal Society (1983); Ellison-Cliffe Medal (1988); Baly Medal (1991)

(Charles) David Marsden (14 April 1938 – 29 September 1998), FRS was a British neurologist who made a significant contribution to the field of movement disorders. He was described as 'arguably the leading academic neurologist and neuroscientist of his generation in the UK'.

== Education and early life ==
Marsden was born in Croydon in 1938. He trained in medicine at St Thomas' Hospital London. He was awarded intercalated Bachelor of Science and Master of Science degrees in 1960 on the subject of pigmentation of the substantia nigra. He obtained his Bachelor of Medicine, Bachelor of Surgery (MBBS) in 1963, and became a member of the Royal College of Physicians (MRCP) in 1965.

== Career and research ==
He was a lecturer at St Thomas' Hospital for two years before proceeding to the National Hospital for Neurology and Neurosurgery as a senior resident house physician. In 1970 he became Honorary Consultant Neurologist to the Maudsley and Bethlem Royal Hospitals and at the King's College Hospital, and also Senior Lecturer at the Institute of Psychiatry. He became joint Chair of Neurology at the Institute of Psychiatry and Kings College Hospital medical school in 1972. He succeeded Roger Gilliat as Chair of Neurology at the Institute of Neurology, Queen Square in 1987, and became the Dean of Neurology eight years later. He had just started a one year sabbatical at the National Institute of Health at Bethesda for a detailed study of apraxia when he died suddenly from an unsuspected congenital coronary anomaly at the age of 60 years.

Marsden's major works were in movement disorders. His interest in this field started with his medical school thesis which was a comparative study of mammalian substantia nigra. After graduation his initial interest was the neurophysiological study of parkinsonian tremor. His later contributions include the complications of levodopa; the motor control physiology of dystonia, myoclonus, and essential tremor; the discovery of the mitochondrial defect in the substantia nigra in Parkinson's disease; and the use of fluorodopa positron emission tomography (PET) to study the growth of embryonic tissue transplants in Parkinson's disease. He described several neurological conditions such as painful legs/moving toes, cortical and corticospinal myoclonus, and primary writing tremor. He was instrumental in establishing dystonia as an organic disease rather than a hysterical condition, and made a major contribution to its classification. He established the UK Parkinson's Disease Society´s brain bank.

Marsden collaborated at King's College with Peter Jenner and John Rothwell. One of his most important collaborators was Stanley Fahn who is at the Columbia Presbyterian Hospital in New York; together they founded the Movement Disorders journal and the Movement Disorder Society

Marsden published more than 800 peer reviewed papers and over 208 book chapters. He was, for ten years, editor of the Movement Disorders Journal and the Journal of Neurology, Neurosurgery, and Psychiatry; he was also on the editorial boards of 21 other journals

== Awards and honours ==
He received several awards during his lifetime, including being elected a Fellow of the Royal Society (FRS) in 1983 and Honorary Doctor of Science (DSc) from the University of London in 1984. In 1988 he received the Ellison-Cliffe Medal from the Royal Society of Medicine.
