= Michael Hausser =

British scientist

Professor Michael Häusser FRS FMedSci
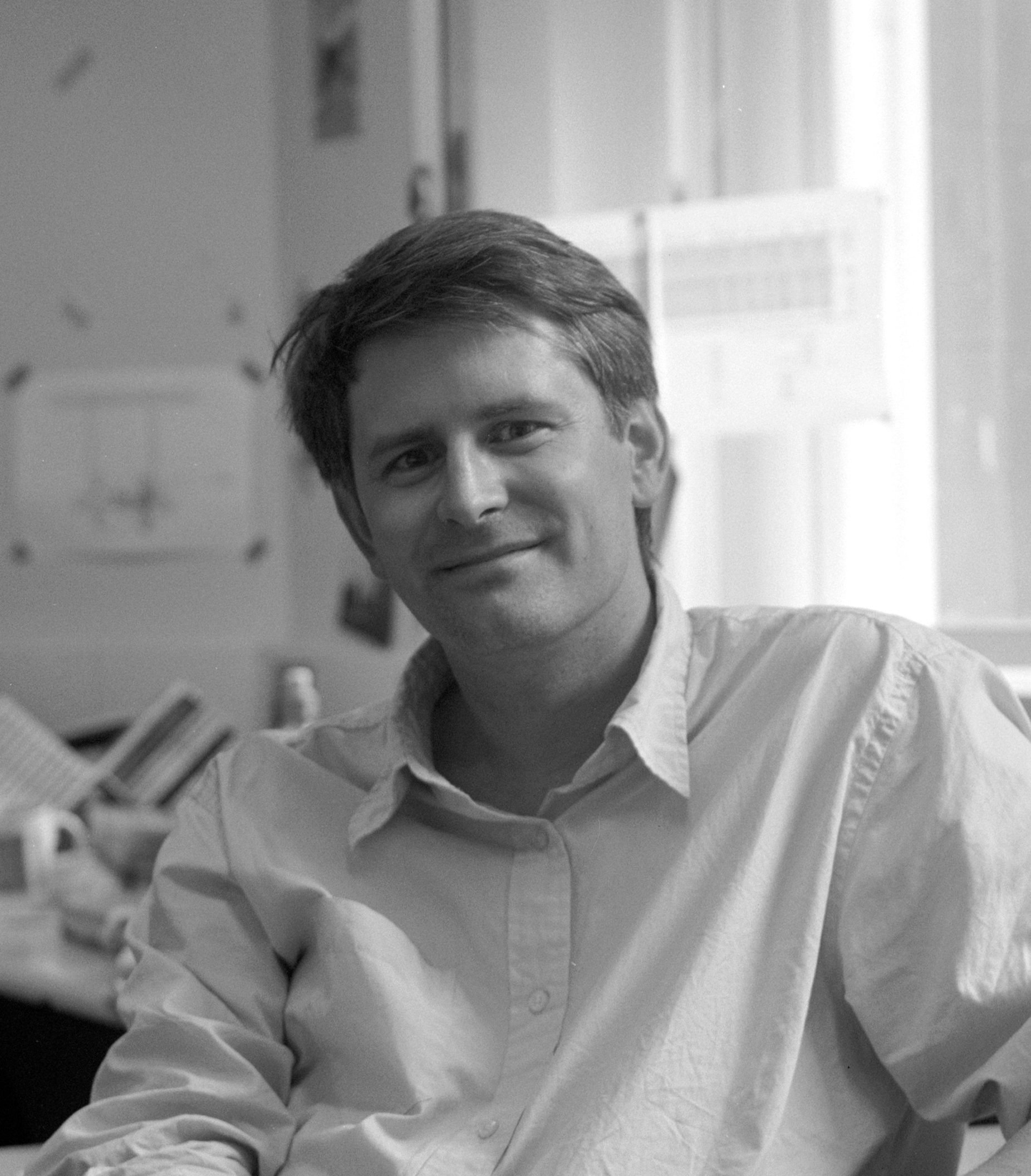
- Häusser in 2005
- Born: Michael A. Häusser
- Education: University of Oxford
- Awards: FRS (2015); FMedSci (2012)
- Scientific career
- Fields: Neuroscience; Dendrites; Neural circuits; Behavior; Neural computation
- Workplaces: University College London; Max Planck Institute for Medical Research; École Normale Supérieure
- Thesis: Intrinsic properties and sympatic inhibition of substantia nigra neurones (1992)
- Doctoral advisor: Julian Jack
- Website: dendrites.org

Michael A. Häusser is a British scientist who is professor of Neuroscience, based in the Wolfson Institute for Biomedical Research at University College London (UCL).

== Education ==
Hausser was educated at the University of Oxford where he was awarded a DPhil in 1992 for research supervised by James Julian Bennett Jack on neurons in the substantia nigra.

== Research ==
Häusser's research interests are in neuroscience, dendrites, biological neural networks and artificial neural networks.

== Awards and honours ==
Häusser was elected a Fellow of the Royal Society (FRS) in 2015. His certificate of election reads:

Michael Häusser has made fundamental contributions to our understanding of how the complex dendritic structures of nerve cells contribute to the functional computations that occur in the mammalian brain. He has achieved this by the introduction and exploitation of advanced techniques, coupled with careful quantitative analysis and modelling of the experimental results. His most distinctive contribution has been to illuminate how non-linear mechanisms in neuronal dendrites contribute to the complex behaviour and plasticity of nerve networks in the brain.

Häusser was also elected a Fellow of the Academy of Medical Sciences (FMedSci) in 2012.

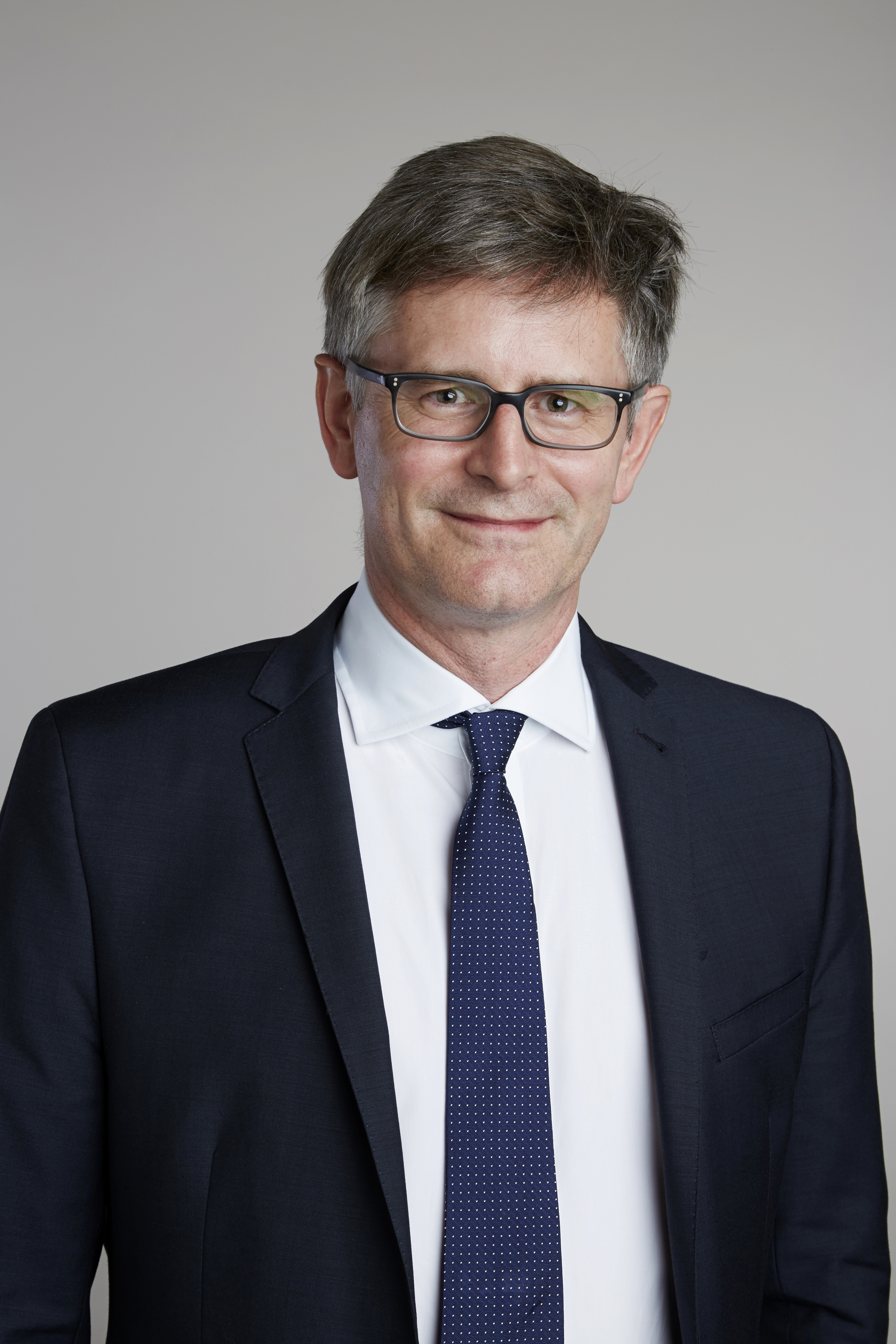
Michael Häusser in 2015
