= Baly Medal =

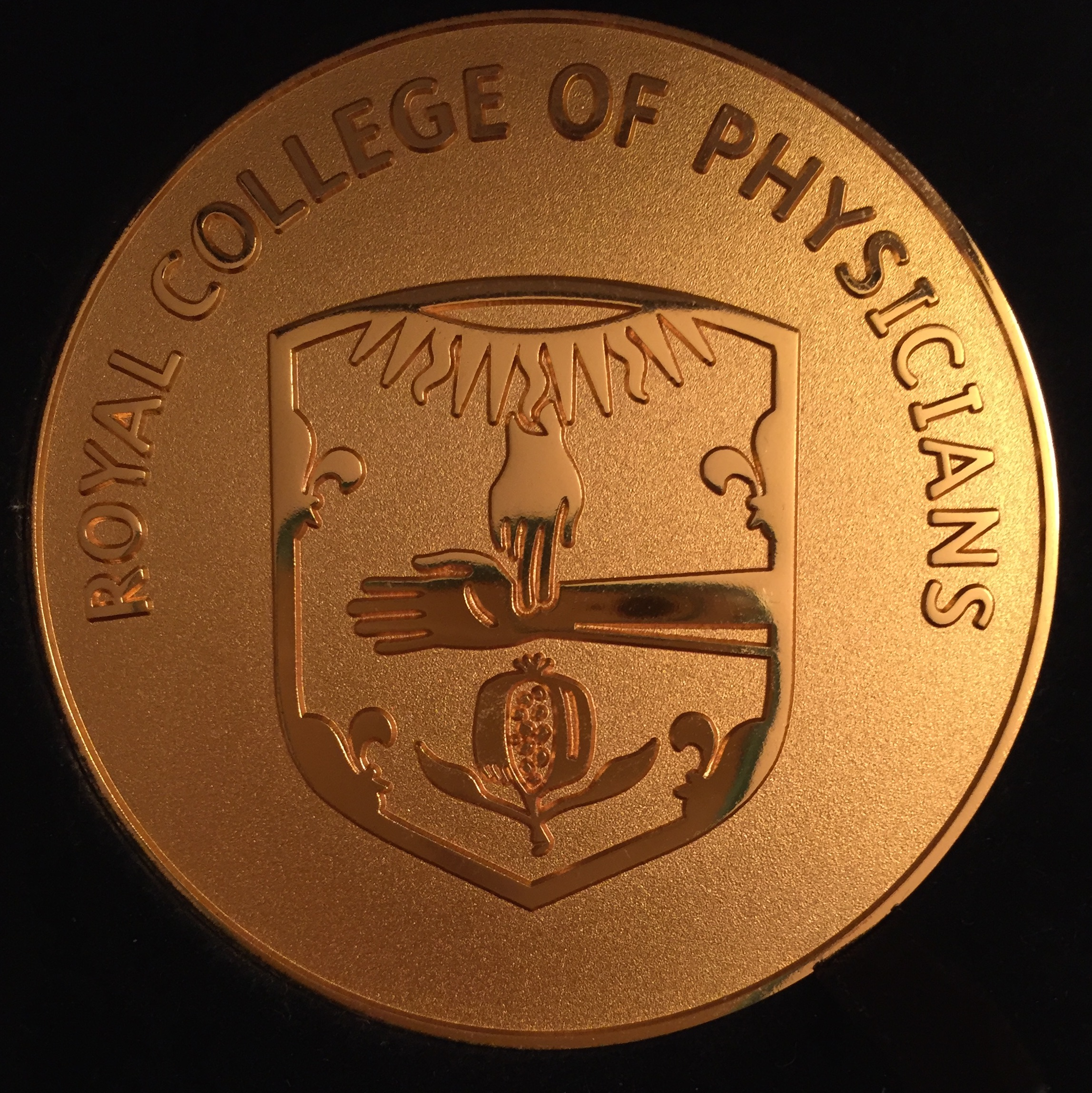
Baly Medal

The Baly Medal is a biennial award awarded by the Royal College of Physicians of London.

Founded by a gift from Frederick Daniel Dyster (1809?–93) received in 1866, confirmed by deed 1930 – in memory of William Baly: £400 to provide a gold medal for the person deemed to have most distinguished himself in the science of physiology, especially during the previous two years. The award is made every alternate year on the recommendation of the President and Council at the Quarterly Meeting in July and presented on the occasion of the Harveian Oration.

== Medallists ==
Source 1871–1911 RCP

- 1869: Richard Owen
- 1871: Lionel Smith Beale
- 1873: William Sharpey
- 1875: Claude Bernard
- 1877: Carl Ludwig
- 1879: Charles Darwin
- 1881: John Burdon-Sanderson
- 1883: Charles-Édouard Brown-Séquard
- 1885: William Kitchen Parker
- 1887: David Ferrier
- 1889: Rudolf Heidenhain
- 1891: Michael Foster
- 1893: Moritz Schiff
- 1895: W. H. Gaskell
- 1897: Edward Albert Sharpey-Schafer
- 1899: Charles Scott Sherrington
- 1901: Frederick William Pavy
- 1903: John Newport Langley
- 1905: Ivan Pavlov
- 1907: Ernest Henry Starling
- 1909: Emil Fischer
- 1911: William Dobinson Halliburton
- 1913: J. B. S. Haldane
- 1915: Frederick Gowland Hopkins
- 1917: William Maddock Bayliss
- 1919: Leonard Hill
- 1921: Henry Dale
- 1923: Joseph Barcroft
- 1925:
- 1927: Archibald Vivian Hill
- 1929: Edgar Douglas Adrian
- 1931: Walter Bradford Cannon
- 1933: Robert Robison
- 1935: Francis Marshall
- 1937: Ernest Kennaway
- 1939: Charles Best
- 1941: Edgar Allen
- 1943: Frederic Bartlett
- 1945: August Krogh
- 1947: Bernardo Alberto Houssay
- 1949: Edward Mellanby
- 1951: George de Hevesy
- 1953: Karl Lashley
- 1955: Alan Hodgkin
- 1957: Ernest Basil Verney
- 1959: Ivan de Burgh Daly
- 1961: John Eccles
- 1963: Wilhelm Siegmund Feldberg
- 1965: Roderic Alfred Gregory
- 1967: Bernard Katz
- 1969: George Wingfield Harris
- 1971: Dorothy Hodgkin
- 1973: Eric William Horton
- 1975: Andrew Huxley
- 1977: John Vane
- 1979: Hans Kosterlitz
- 1981: Malcolm Davenport Milne
- 1983: William Paton
- 1985: Paul Polani
- 1987: Aaron Klug
- 1989: Michael Berridge
- 1991: David Marsden
- 1993: Denis Noble
- 1995: Charles Nicholas Hales
- 1997: Alec Jeffreys
- 1999: Paul Nurse
- 2001: Colin Blakemore
- 2003: John Sulston
- 2005: Gregory Winter
- 2007: Sydney Brenner
- 2009: Martin Evans
- 2011: Peter Ratcliffe
- 2013: Stephen O'Rahilly
- 2015:
- 2017: Dimitri Kullmann
- 2019:
- 2022: Brian Diffey

== See also ==
- List of medicine awards
- Prizes named after people
