= Johanna Chandler =

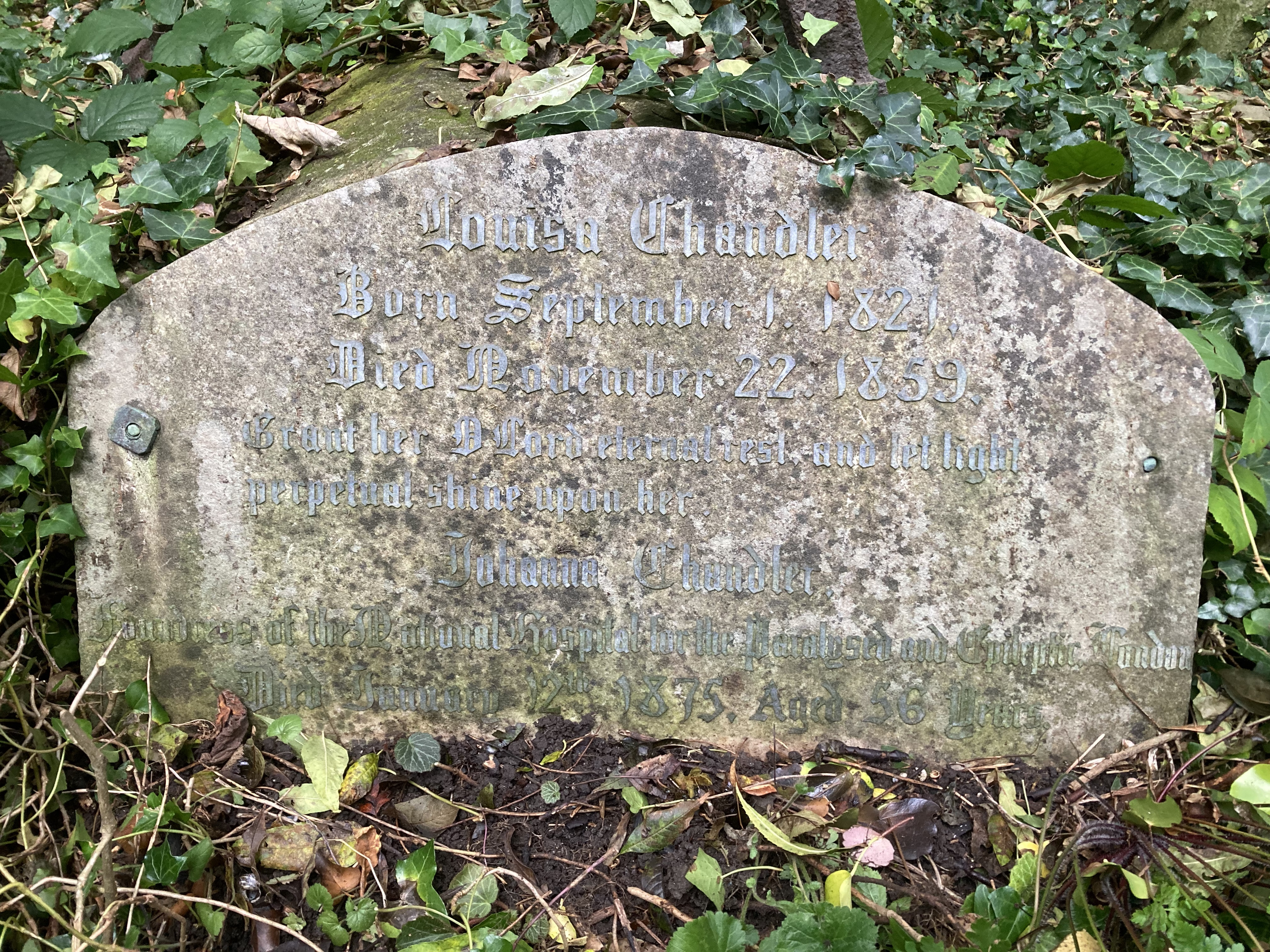
- Grave of Johanna Chandler in Highgate Cemetery
- Born: c. 1820
- Died: 12 January 1875; London
- Resting place: Highgate Cemetery

Johanna Chandler (c. 1820 – 12 January 1875) was a British orphan who founded a charity and a home for the paralysed which is now the National Hospital for Neurology and Neurosurgery in central London, United Kingdom.

== Life ==
Chandler was orphaned as a child and she and her sister Elizabeth went to stay in St Pancras in London where they cared for their paralysed maternal grandmother. They made a commitment to their grandmother before she died. Realising the need for help they first tried to raise money by assembling jewellery from seashells and then offering them for sale. Chandler eventually managed to raise 800 pounds due to a benefit organised at The Mansion House on 2 November 1859. This was made possible by the support of the Lord Mayor of London, who had paralysis too.

With the money raised she was able to open two homes and care for outpatients. The main location was in Queen Square and it was called National Hospital for the Paralysed and Epileptic. When it opened, it could hold just eight female patients but it expanded quickly with an extra ward for male patients. By 1866 the charity had bought an adjacent property to expand further. Chandler created a Samaritan fund to assist others with paralysis and at East Finchley a convalescent home for women was created.

Her brother Edward continued her work after Johanna died in London in 1875 of a stroke leaving £2000 in her will.

She was buried with her sister Louisa (d.1859) and brother Edward (d.1881) on the western side of Highgate Cemetery (plot no.9952).
