= Dimsdale =

Suburb of Newcastle-under-Lyme, England

Coordinates: 53.0293°N 2.2261°W

- Location within Staffordshire
- OS grid reference: SJ849480
- District: Newcastle-under-Lyme
- Shire county: Staffordshire
- Region: West Midlands
- Country: England
- Sovereign state: United Kingdom
- Post town: NEWCASTLE
- Postcode district: ST5
- Dialling code: 01782
- Police: Staffordshire
- Fire: Staffordshire
- Ambulance: West Midlands
- UK Parliament: Newcastle-under-Lyme

Dimsdale is a suburb of Newcastle-under-Lyme in Staffordshire, England.
