= Synaptopathy =

- A common cause of synaptopathy is glutamate excitotoxicity. As shown in the animation, the over-activation of NMDA receptors leads to an increase in free intracellular calcium, which produces oxygen free-radicals and eventually neuronal dysfunction.

A synaptopathy is a disease of the brain, spinal cord or peripheral nervous system relating to the dysfunction of synapses. This can arise as a result of a mutation in a gene encoding a synaptic protein such as an ion channel, neurotransmitter receptor, or a protein involved in neurotransmitter release. It can also arise as a result of an autoantibody targeting a synaptic protein. Synaptopathies caused by ion channel mutations are also known as synaptic channelopathies. An example is episodic ataxia. Myasthenia gravis is an example of an autoimmune synaptopathy. Some toxins also affect synaptic function. Tetanus toxin and botulinum toxin affect neurotransmitter release. Tetanus toxin can enter the body via a wound, and botulinum toxin can be ingested or administered therapeutically to alleviate dystonia or as cosmetic treatment.

Another example of synaptopathy occurs in the auditory system. This cochlear synaptopathy has been seen after prolonged noise exposure in both primate and non-primate models. Two possible reasons for this neuronal death are both glutamate-mediated excitotoxicity in the postsynaptic terminal, and presynaptic ribbon damage which occurs by an unknown mechanism.

Synaptopathies are attracting research interest because they provide an insight into fundamental mechanisms of synaptic transmission and because an improved understanding of disease mechanisms may lead to new treatments.

Some diseases of unknown etiology have been proposed to be synaptopathies. Examples include autism spectrum disorder and schizophrenia. Synaptic dysfunction can also occur in neurodegenerative disorders such as Alzheimer's. Immune-mediated cerebellar ataxias represent a group of disorders causing cerebellar ataxia induced by a dysfunction of synapses. Increasing knowledge of the genetic basis of these diseases has linked proteins to the function of the synapse. Age-related cochlear synaptic and neural degeneration has also been demonstrated in mice.

Molecules such as FMRP1 act as translational repressor thus when ablated such as in FXS result in varying degrees of cellular and behavioural abnormalities. Additional molecules thought to be involved include SynGAP and SHANK1.
