= UCL Queen Square Institute of Neurology =

Academic institution in United Kingdom

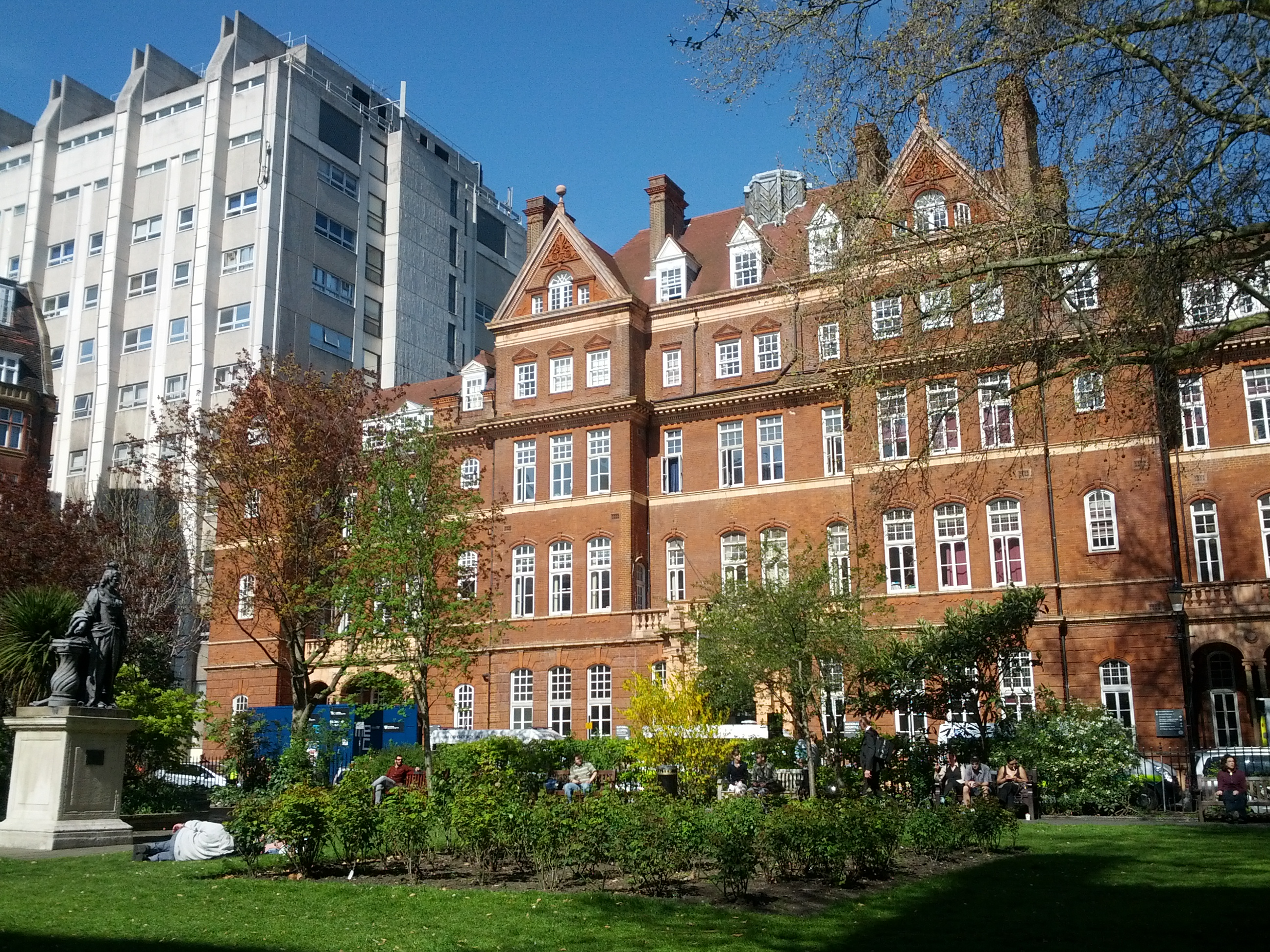
- UCL Queen Square Institute of Neurology (left) and the National Hospital for Neurology and Neurosurgery (right) in Queen Square, London
- Established: 1950
- Director: Michael G. Hanna
- Administrative staff: Around 800
- Students: Around 500 graduate students
- Location: Queen Square, London, United Kingdom
- Website: www.ucl.ac.uk/ion

The UCL Queen Square Institute of Neurology is an institute within the Faculty of Brain Sciences of University College London (UCL) and is located in London, United Kingdom. Together with the National Hospital for Neurology and Neurosurgery, an adjacent facility with which it cooperates closely, the institute forms a major centre for teaching, training and research in neurology and allied clinical and basic neurosciences.

The institute has a staff of around 750 and 500 graduate students, an annual turnover of £102 million and occupies around 12,000 sq m of laboratory and office space. Four of the 12 most highly cited authors in neuroscience and behaviour in the world are currently based at the institute. The institute conducts research into a wide range of neurological diseases, including movement disorders, multiple sclerosis, epilepsy, brain cancer, stroke and brain injury, muscle and nerve disorders, cognitive dysfunction and dementia. It forms a key part of UCL Neuroscience.

== History ==
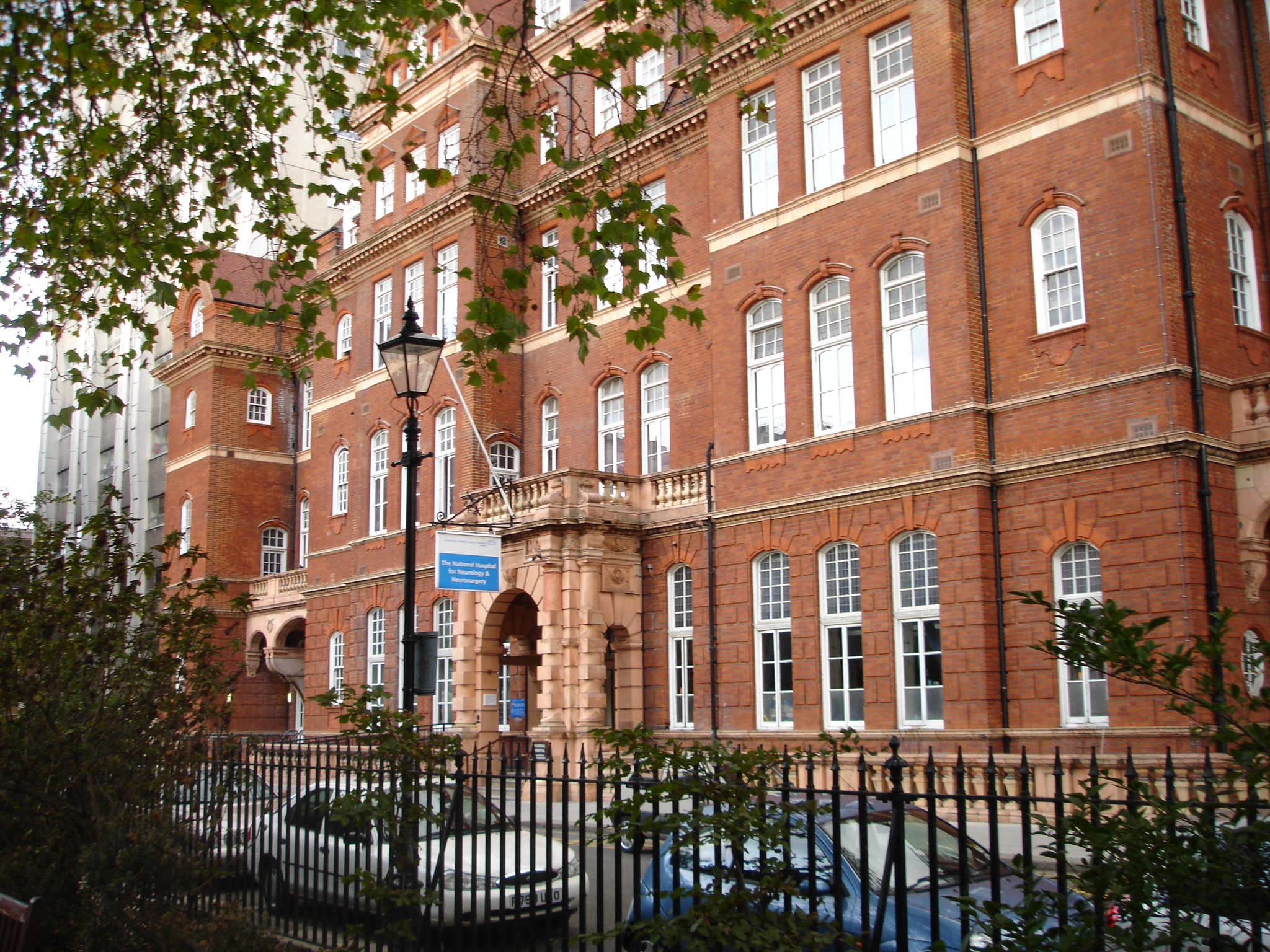
The National Hospital for Neurology and Neurosurgery

The Institute of Neurology was established in 1950. It merged with UCL in 1997, becoming the UCL Institute of Neurology. The institute is centred at Queen Square House, a concrete tower in the north-east corner of Queen Square, London that opened in 1971. Due to expansion, some of the institute's departments and activities are now based in numerous locations in Queen Square and surrounding parts of Bloomsbury. The UCL Institute of Neurology was rebranded to UCL Queen Square Institute of Neurology in September, 2018.

In 2019, UCL began work to expand the footprint of the Eastman Dental Hospital site on Gray's Inn Road to enable construction of a new building for the UCL Queen Square Institute of Neurology and a hub for the UK Dementia Research Institute. Completion is scheduled for end of 2027.

== Departments ==
The institute currently holds 679 active research projects, totalling £262m. Annual turnover is £102 million. In the 2008 Research Assessment Exercise almost 100 staff were submitted for evaluation and 70% of research was deemed to be internationally competitive or world leading. Submitted papers received an average citation rate of 40 per paper.

The most recent research assessment exercise, REF2014, showed that the institute, as part of the Faculty of Brain Sciences, is the first rated UK institution for neuroscience research output

The institute is home to the following research departments and centres

- Department of Brain Repair & Rehabilitation
- Department of Clinical and Experimental Epilepsy
- Department of Clinical and Movement Neurosciences
  - Ataxia Centre
  - Movement Disorders Centre
  - Queen Square Brain Bank
  - Reta Lila Weston Institute
  - Sara Koe PSP Centre
  - Unit of Functional Neurosurgery
- Department of Imaging Neuroscience
  - Leopold Muller Functional imaging laboratory (FIL)
  - Max Planck UCL Centre for Computational Psychiatry and Ageing Research
- Department of Neurodegenerative Disease
  - Dementia Research Centre
  - Huntington's Disease Centre
- Department of Neuroinflammation
  - Queen Square Multiple Sclerosis Centre
- Department of Neuromuscular Diseases
  - RC International Centre for Genomic Medicine in Neuromuscular Diseases
    - Alzheimer's Research UK Drug Discovery Institute (ARUK-DDI)
    - Queen Square Motor Neuron Disease Centre
    - Queen Square Centre for Neuromuscular Diseases
- UK Dementia Research Institute at UCL
- Wellcome Centre for Human Neuroimaging

The institute also has active collaborative research programmes with the Institute of Cognitive Neuroscience, the Gatsby Computational Neuroscience Unit, the Leonard Wolfson Experimental Neurology Centre and the Sainsbury Wellcome Centre for Neural Circuits and Behaviour.

== Notable research findings ==
In November 2002, a team of researchers at the institute led by Professor John Collinge published the results of a study which showed that the number of cases of CJD caused by the consumption of BSE-infected beef may have been higher than previously calculated and that BSE, in addition to causing variant CJD (vCJD), may also have caused some cases of "sporadic" CJD.

In February 2004, a team of researchers at the institute led by Tania Singer published research showing that it is possible for one human to feel another's pain and that the same regions of the brain are activated in the empathizer and the empathisee. In July 2005, a team of researchers at the institute led by Davina Bristow published the results of research funded by the Wellcome Trust in Current Biology which demonstrated that parts of the human brain are temporarily "switched off" when blinking.

In September 2005, a team of researchers at the institute led by Victor Tybulewicz at the National Institute for Medical Research and Professor Elizabeth Fisher from the institute published the results of a study in which they had been able to introduce most of a human chromosome into mice, producing the most successful recreation of Down's syndrome to date.

In August 2007, a team of researchers at the institute led by Henrik Ehrsson published research in Science which was the first to describe how it is possible to use cameras to trick the human brain into thinking that a person is elsewhere in a room than they really are.

In February 2011, a team of researchers at the institute led by Nick Wood published the results of a genetic study which had identified five new genes linked to Parkinson's disease.

In September 2015, Prof Sarah Tabrizi began the first human trial of a 'gene silencing' antisense oligonucleotide drug, IONIS-HTT_{Rx}, for the neurodegenerative disease Huntington's disease at the institute's Leonard Wolfson Experimental Neurology Centre.

== Notable researchers ==
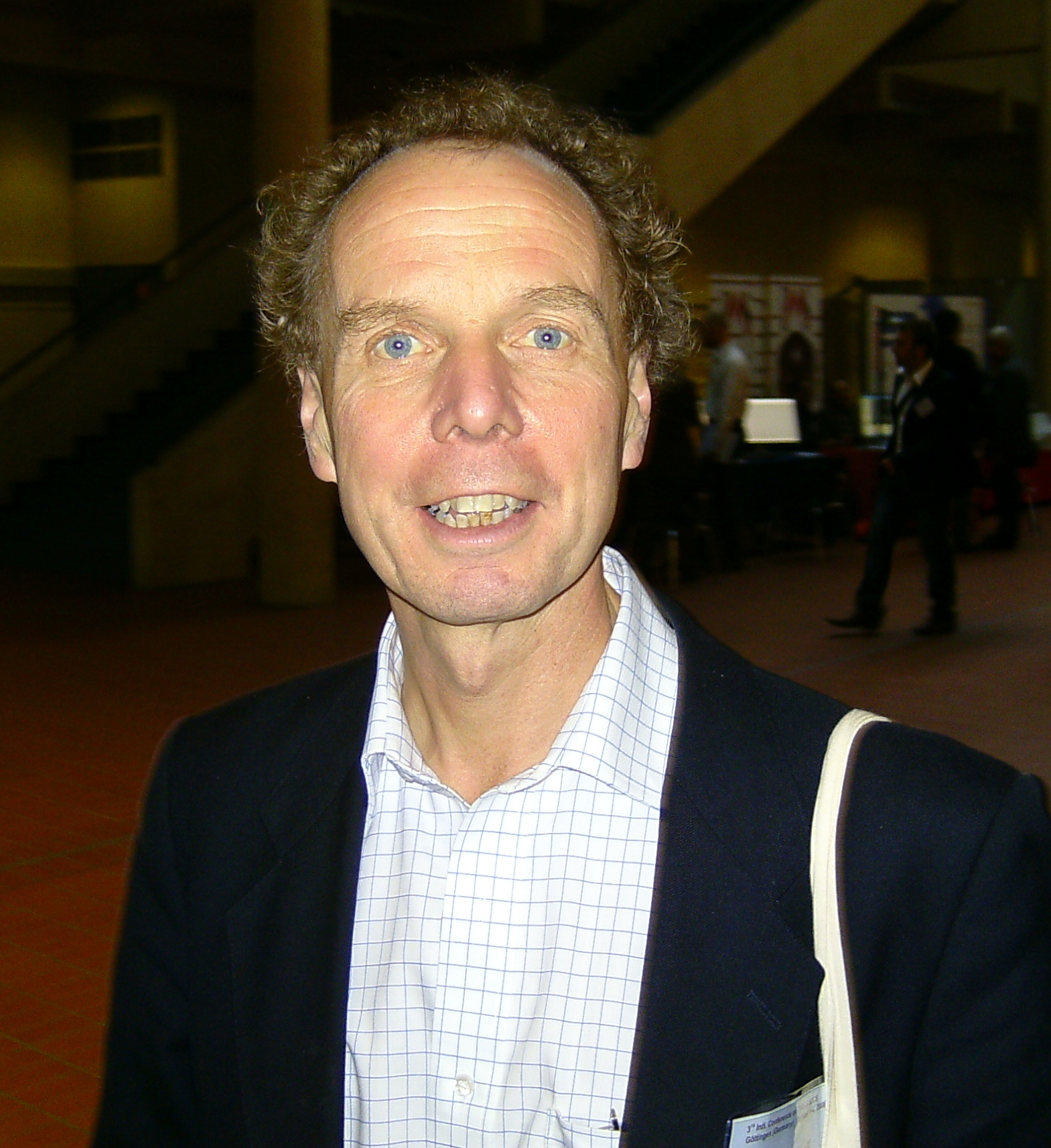
Prof John Rothwell FMedSci

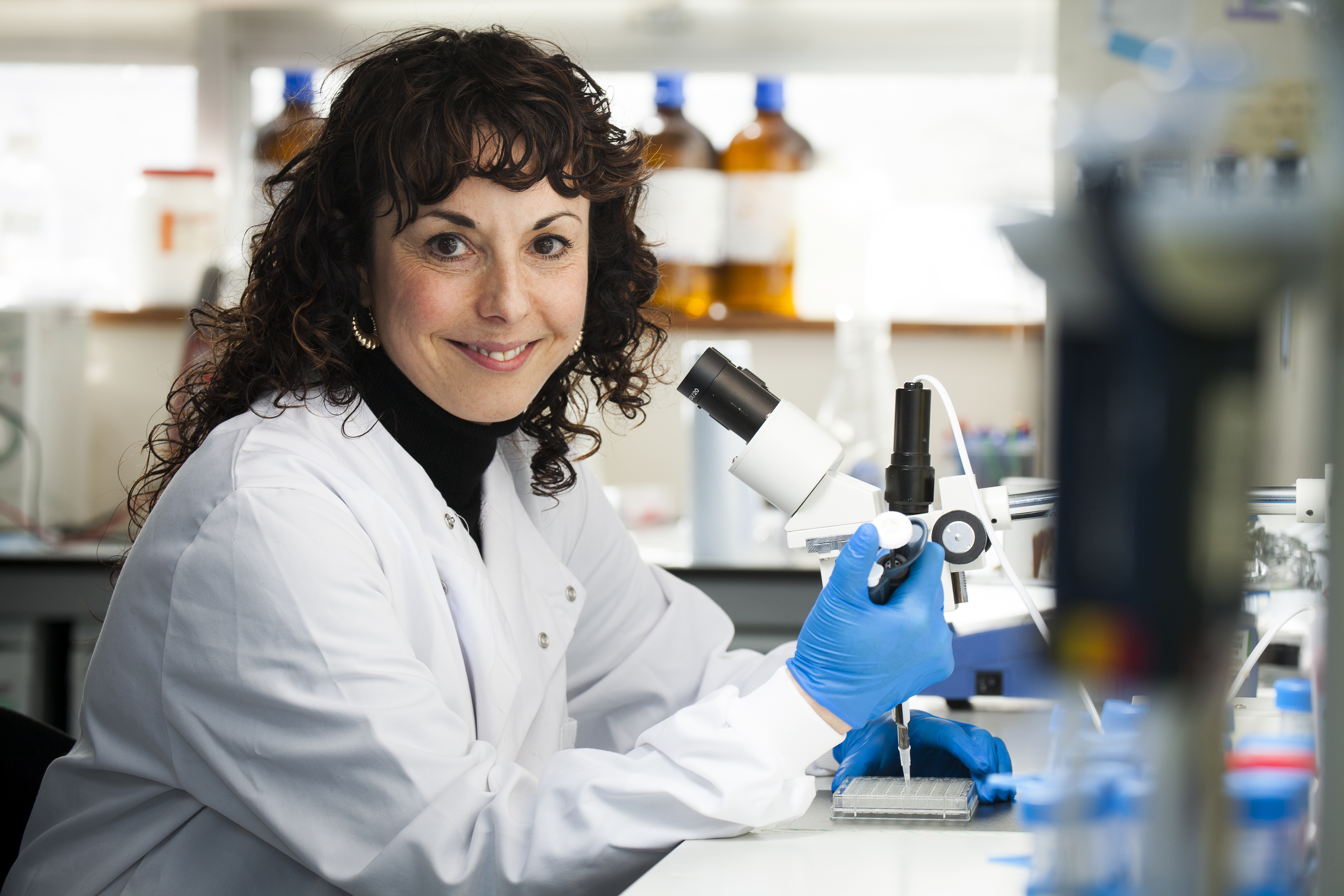
Prof Sarah Tabrizi FMedSci

=== Nobel Laureates ===
- James Rothman (Dept of Clinical & Experimental Epilepsy)

=== Fellows of the Royal Society ===
- Gillian Bates (Research Department of Neurodegenerative Disease)
- John Collinge (MRC Prion Unit and Institute of Prion Diseases)
- Raymond Dolan (Wellcome Trust Centre for Neuroimaging)
- John Hardy (UK Dementia Research Institute)
- Dimitri Kullmann (Dept Clinical & Experimental Epilepsy)
- Geoffrey Raisman (Spinal Repair Unit)
- Elizabeth Warrington (Emeritus, Dementia Research Centre)

=== Fellows of the Academy of Medical Sciences ===
- W. Ian McDonald
- John S. Duncan (Dept of Clinical and Experimental Epilepsy)
- Elizabeth Fisher (Dept of Neurodegenerative Disease)
- Nick Fox (Dementia Research Centre)
- Dimitri Kullmann (Dept of Clinical & Experimental Epilepsy)
- Andrew Lees (Department of Clinical and Movement Neuroscience)
- Roger Lemon (Department of Clinical and Movement Neuroscience)
- David Miller (Department of Clinical and Movement Neuroscience)
- Cathy Price (Wellcome Centre for Neuroimaging)
- Martin Rossor (Dementia Research Centre)
- John Rothwell (Department of Clinical and Movement Neuroscience)
- Alan Thompson (Faculty of Brain Sciences
- Sarah Tabrizi (Huntington's Disease Centre)

=== Members of Academia Europaea ===
- Dimitri Kullmann (Dept of Clinical & Experimental Epilepsy)
- James Rothman (Dept of Clinical & Experimental Epilepsy)
- Dmitri Rusakov (Dept of Clinical & Experimental Epilepsy)

=== Other notable researchers ===
- Michael Hanna (Institute Director)
- Ley Sander (Department of Clinical and Experimental Epilepsy)
- Edward Wild (Huntington's Disease Centre)

== Library ==
The institute operates a joint library with the National Hospital for Neurology and Neurosurgery, which is located at the institute. The library is the recognised Library for Neurology within the University of London and contains an important collection of specialist neurology, neurosurgery and neuroscience books and journals, together with general medical and biomedical literature. Holders of identity cards for the institute, UCL, the National Hospital for Neurology and Neurosurgery or University College London Hospitals NHS Foundation Trust may become registered users.

=== Archives ===
The archives hold numerous collections including:

- 1500 bound volumes of NHNN (National Hospital for Neurology and Neurosurgery) case notes from 1863 to 1946, of which William Richard Gowers' have been digitised.
- Administrative records for the NHNN from 1859 to 1948, of which the Annual Reports and Board of Management minutes from 1859 to 1948 have been digitised.
- Employment records of NHNN staff from 1860 to 1946, of which medical staff records have been digitised.
- Deeds, plans, and insurance documents, of which the NHNN's plans have been digitised.
- Approximately 3000 photographs, most of which have been digitised.
- 1900+ films documenting patient consultations.
- Over 250 volumes of Maida Vale Hospital case notes from 1906 to 1937.
- Unpublished papers and lectures, including William Richard Gowers postgraduate lectures, John Hughlings Jackson's unpublished papers discovered in 2003, and the Jubilee Scrapbook, which contains NHNN items from 1908 to 1910.

In addition, the library has an extensive rare book collection held in the Louise Shepherd Room and holds many medical images and drawings, especially of those done by Carswell and Bell, as well as the Sheridan Russell's register of paintings at the NHNN.

== See also ==
- UCLH/UCL Comprehensive Biomedical Research Centre
- UCL Partners
- Francis Crick Institute
- Brain Research Trust
