= Maida Vale Hospital for Nervous Diseases =

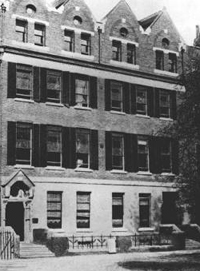
- The National Hospital for the Paralysed and Epileptic at Blandford Place in 1867

- Location within Westminster

Geography
- Location: Maida Vale, London, England, United Kingdom
- Coordinates: 51.5262°N 0.1807°W

Organisation
- Care system: NHS England
- Type: Specialist

Services
- Speciality: Nervous system diseases, epilepsy, paralysis

History
- Founded: 1867
- Closed: 1993

Links
- Lists: Hospitals in England

The Maida Vale Hospital for Nervous Diseases was a hospital that existed in west London from 1867 to 1993.

== History ==
The hospital was founded as the London Infirmary for Epilepsy and Paralysis by the German physician Julius Althaus (1833-1900) in 1867. In its first incarnation, it was based at Blandford Place in Marylebone. It moved to Portland Terrace in 1872, becoming the Hospital for Diseases of the Nervous System in 1873 and the Hospital for Epilepsy and Paralysis in 1876. It moved to a new building in Maida Vale, designed by the architects Young & Hall, opened by the Duchess of Argyll in 1903. At that time it became the Hospital for Epilepsy and Paralysis and Other Diseases of the Nervous System, Maida Vale. It became the Maida Vale Hospital for Nervous Diseases (including Epilepsy and Paralysis) in 1937.

The facility joined the National Health Service as the National Hospital for Nervous Diseases, Maida Vale, at which time it also became part of the National Hospitals for Nervous Diseases, now the National Hospital for Neurology and Neurosurgery. The site at 4 Maida Vale (the main road) was closed in 1993 and sold for development.

== Notable staff ==
A series of nurses who trained at The London Hospital under Eva Luckes were Matron of Maida Vale Hospital for over 25 years.

- Mary Louisa Pollett, (1865–1963), Matron from 1906 to 1907. She trained between 1893 and 1895. Pollett was matron of the Royal London Ophthalmic Hospital, City Road, London from 1907 to 1927.
- Rose 'Stella' Weston (1867–1945), Matron 1907 to July 1932. Weston trained between 1897 and 1899. She was assistant matron of The London Chest Hospital, and Matron of the Central London Ophthalmic Hospital before moving to Maida Vale.
- Ellen Kathleen Robson, (1890– ), Matron from 1932, left by 1939. She trained between 1919-1922.

== See also ==
- Leonard Guthrie
