= Association of British Neurologists =

The Association of British Neurologists is a professional organisation founded in 1932 and expanded to include overseas membership in 1937. The Association produces guidelines for the treatment of neurological conditions.

== Members ==
At 31 December 2014 there were 740 ordinary members, 204 senior members, 24 honorary members, 50 honorary foreign members, 70 overseas members, 385 associate members and 29 affiliate members. It is an active member of the Neurological Alliance and holds an annual conference. The current (2017 - 2019) President is Mary Reilly.

In December 2014, the Association produced a national study of neurological services in 195 acute hospitals, which compared their services against the best practice standards set by the association. It showed “dramatic” variations in access to daily neurological consultations. None of the hospitals where neurologists were based provided seven-day access to consultants, and only 49% provided access to consultants 5 days per week.

== Arms ==
Coat of arms of Association of British Neurologists
Crest A demi unicorn Argent armed maned tufted and unguled Or. Escutcheon Per pale Gules and Azure three chevronels Argent over all a pile throughout Or on a chief per pale Azure and Gules three chess rooks Or. Supporters On the dexter a hippocampus Azure and on the sinister a hippocampus Gules each holding with the tail a Rod of Aesculapius Or the serpent Vert. Motto Primum Omnium Cerebrum

== See also ==
- Society of British Neurological Surgeons
