= Queen Square, London =

Garden square in Bloomsbury, London, England

Coordinates: 51°31′19″N 0°7′20″W

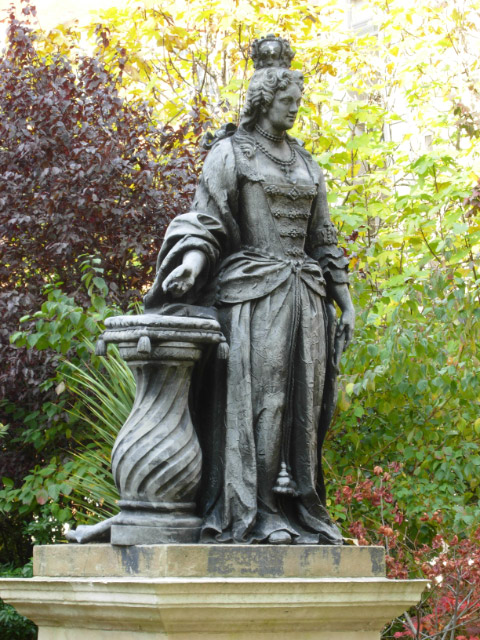
Statue of Queen Charlotte in the square

Queen Square is a garden square in the Bloomsbury district of central London. Many of its buildings are associated with medicine, particularly neurology.

== Construction ==
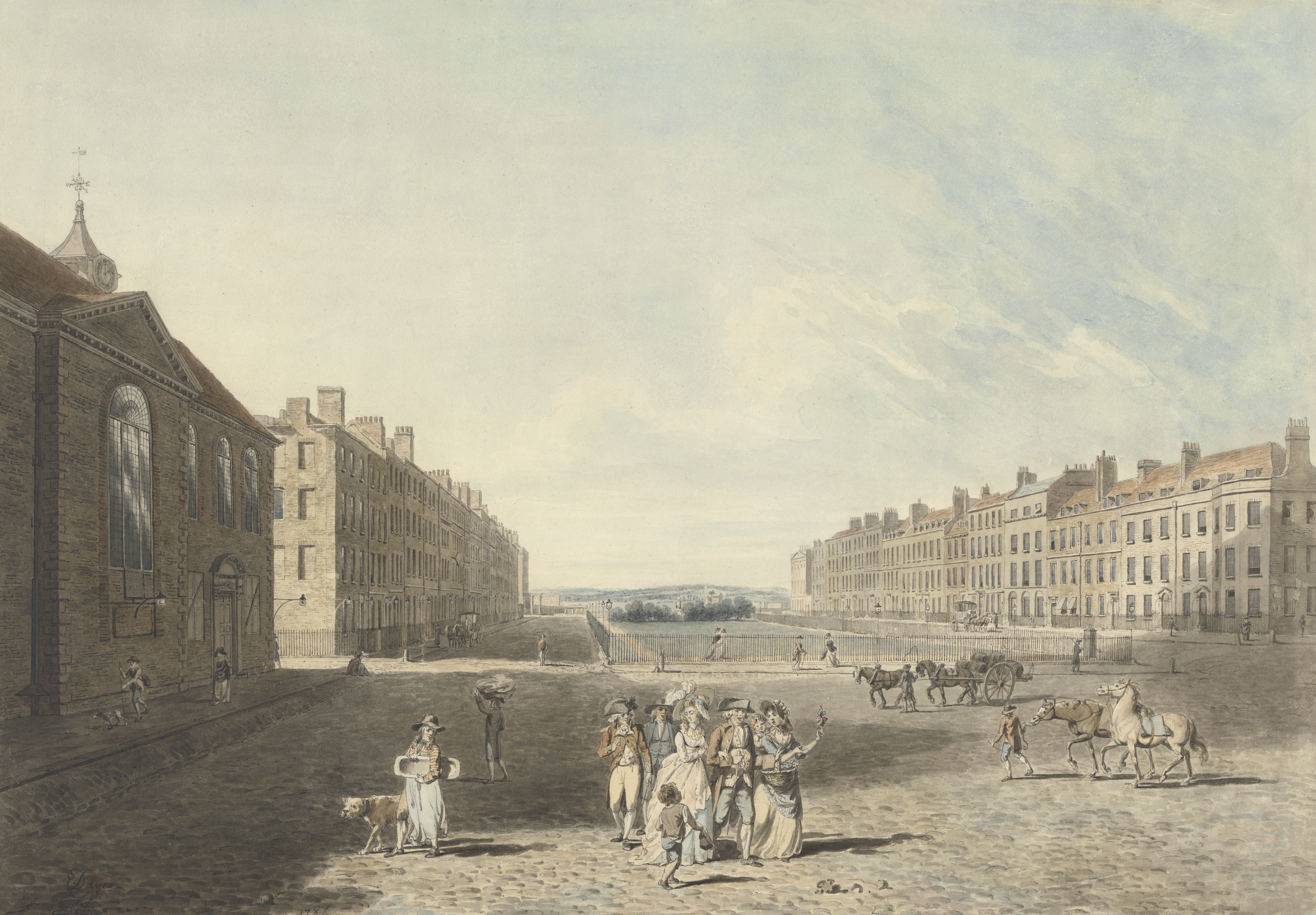
Queen Square in 1786, painted by Edward Dayes. The fields to the north reach as far as Hampstead. The church of St George the Martyr is in the left foreground. Also visible are the first few houses beyond the corner of Cosmo Place now containing the Queen's Larder.

Queen Square was originally constructed between 1716 and 1725. It was formed from the garden of the house of Sir John Cutler, baronet (1608–1693), whose last surviving child, Lady Radnor, died in 1697 leaving no issue. It was left open to the north for the landscape formed by the hills of Hampstead and Highgate.

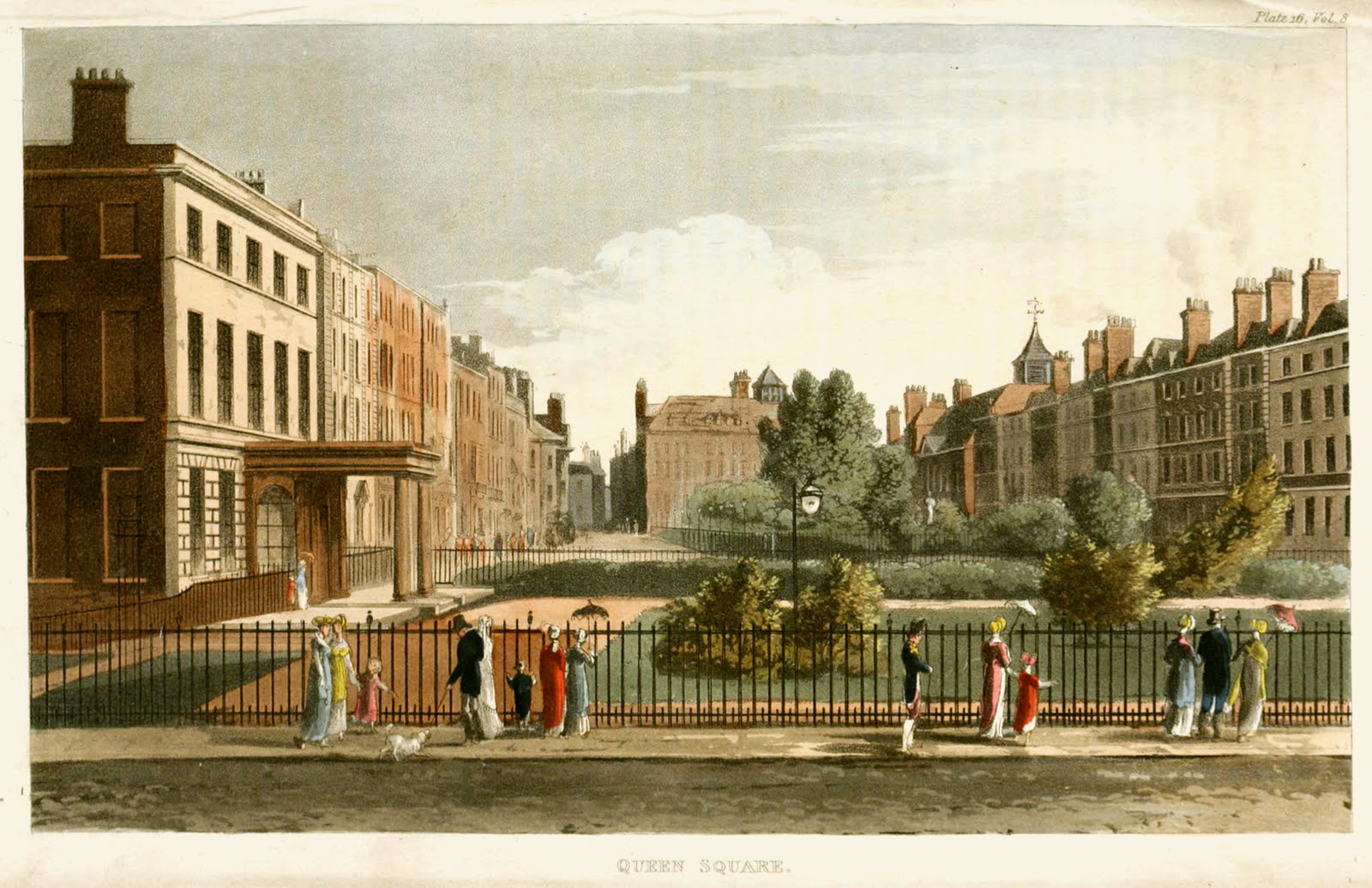
Queen Square in 1812

== Queen Charlotte and treatment for George III ==
A statue contained within the square was misidentified as depicting Queen Anne. This statue is now believed to be a portrayal of Queen Charlotte.

Queen Charlotte's husband, King George III, was treated for mental illness in a house in Queen Square towards the end of his reign. The public house on the southwest corner of the square, called "the Queen’s Larder", was, according to legend, used by Queen Charlotte to store food for the king during his treatment.

The church, dedicated to St George the Martyr, was built following public subscription in 1706. The church's rector from 1747 to 1765 was the famous antiquary William Stukeley, whose rectory was next to the residence of the duke of Powis.

== Late 19th century ==
Built in the early 18th century as a fashionable area, by the mid-19th century it had attracted many French refugees and the shops of sundry booksellers and print sellers. It became a favoured centre for charitable institutions, including the Roman Catholic Aged Poor Society at No. 31, and the Society of St Vincent de Paul.

Gradually the mansions were turned into hospitals and other institutions. The first institution which is still in the square was started by Johanna Chandler in 1860. Elizabeth Malleson started the Working Women's College here in 1864.

The College of Preceptors (also known as the College of Teachers) occupied No. 42 Queen Square from 1855 until 1887.

In 1861, just a year after the first Victorian Turkish bath opened in London, an establishment calling itself the Ladies' True Turkish Bath, opened at No.26. It was the only such bath in London open for women daily. It remained open till 1865, during which time over 37,000 baths were taken.

== 20th and 21st centuries ==
Many of the buildings surrounding the square are devoted to providing, researching and administering health care. Two hospitals, the National Hospital for Neurology and Neurosurgery (NHNN), often referred to synechdochally as "Queen Square", and the Royal London Hospital for Integrated Medicine (formerly the Royal London Homoeopathic Hospital), make up the east side of the square. The Institute of Neurology, part of University College London (UCL), is located in the north east corner of the square. The former Institute for Public Health takes up much of the north side - the building is now used as the administrative centre for the NHNN and Institute of Neurology.

Several buildings on the west side of the square are devoted to medical research and are part of the Institute of Neurology and other departments of UCL. These include Alexandra House at number 17, which houses the UCL Institute of Cognitive Neuroscience and the Gatsby Computational Neuroscience Unit. The Wellcome Trust Centre for Neuroimaging (commonly referred to as the Functional Imaging Laboratory) is located at number 12. Numbers 8–11, the Sir Charles Symonds House, houses the Dementia Research Centre on the first floor and the Centre for Neuromuscular Diseases on the ground floor.

At the southern end of the square is the church mentioned above, the Mary Ward Centre for adult education, and the former Italian Hospital, now part of Great Ormond Street Hospital for children (whose main buildings are in Great Ormond Street, off Queen Square). No 42-3, originally an 18th-century town house, has a long history of educational use: it was occupied by the Royal Female School of Art from 1861, the London County Council Trade School for Girls from 1910, the Technical College for Women in the 1930s, and the Stanhope Institute for adult education in the 1950s. The Mary Ward Centre took over the building in 1982.

A women-only Victorian-style Turkish bath, the women's section of the Imperial Hotel's Turkish baths, had its own additional entrance in Queen Square from 1930 to 1962. The site continues to be occupied by the new Imperial Hotel.

One of the buildings, the Sobell Department, contains a lecture theatre used by UCL for postgraduate teaching. With 220 seats, it is one of the largest lecture theatres in Queen Square. It has an important past, having welcomed famed scientists such as John Hardy and John Fox. Its wear and tear, evident through malfunctioning desks inter alia, highlights this history.

== Notable residents ==
- Edward Arber, literary scholar and anthologist, and his son E.A.N. Arber, botanist, at No 5 in the 1870s.
- Sir William Browne, physician, 1749–1774
- Fanny Burney, novelist, 1770–1774
- Frances Reynolds, painter, 1792–1807
- Francis Ronalds, inventor, 1820–1822
- Frederick Denison Maurice Theologian and founder of The Working Men's College. At No 5 and No 21.

== See also ==
- List of demolished buildings and structures in London
