= National Hospital for Neurology and Neurosurgery =

Coordinates: 51°31′20″N 0°7′19″W

- University College London Hospitals NHS Foundation Trust
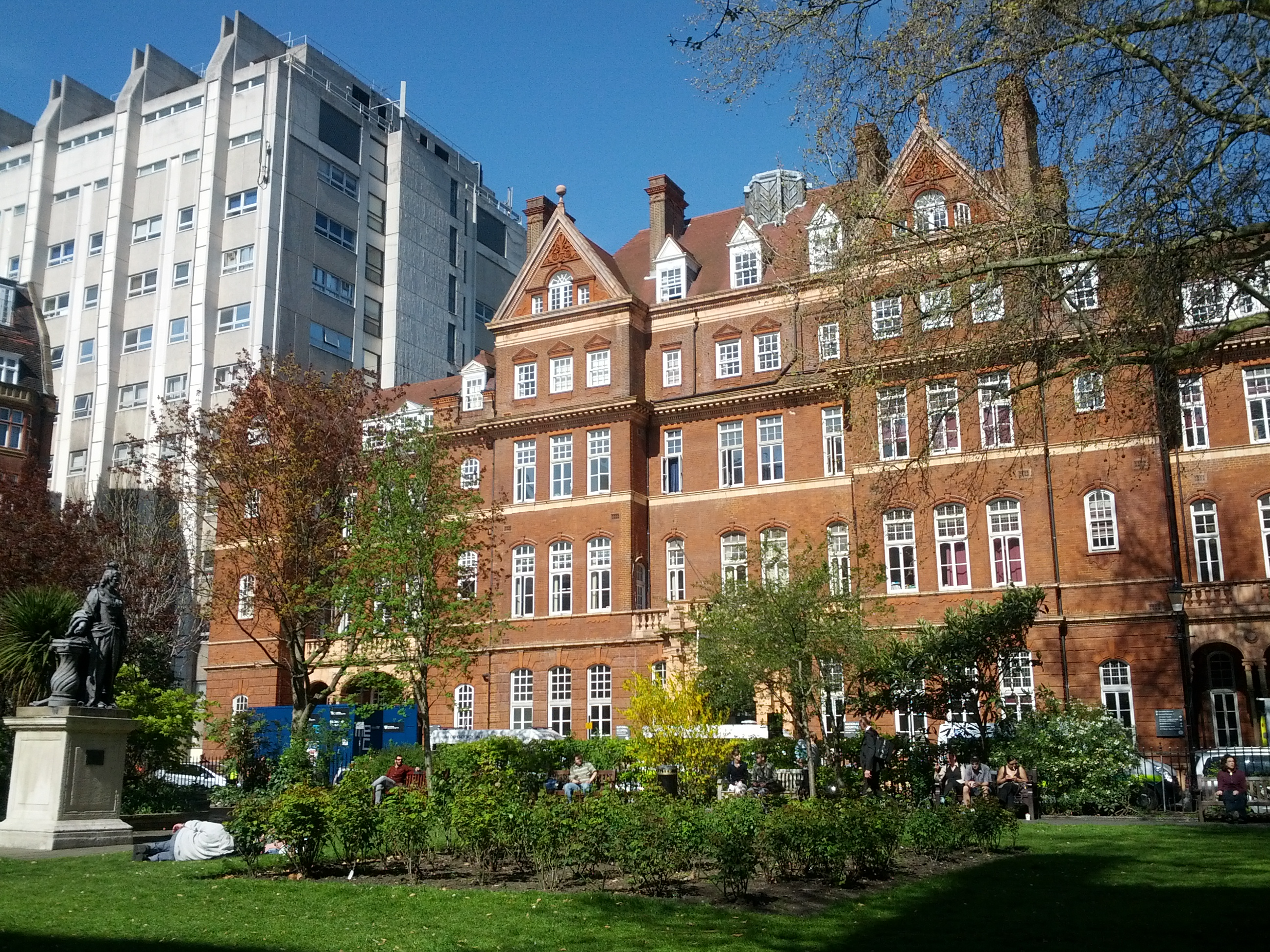
- National Hospital for Neurology and Neurosurgery main entrance and Institute of Neurology, Queen Square, London.

Geography
- Location: London, United Kingdom

Organisation
- Care system: NHS England
- Type: Specialist, teaching
- Affiliated university: University College London

Services
- Emergency department: No
- Beds: 244

History
- Founded: 1859

The National Hospital for Neurology and Neurosurgery (informally the National Hospital or Queen Square) is a neurological hospital in Queen Square, London. It is part of the University College London Hospitals NHS Foundation Trust. It was the first hospital to be established in England dedicated exclusively to treating the diseases of the nervous system. It is closely associated with University College London (UCL) and in partnership with the UCL Institute of Neurology, which occupies the same site, is a major centre for neuroscience research.

== History ==
The hospital was founded by Johanna Chandler as the National Hospital for the Paralysed and Epileptic at Queen Square in 1859. The hospital was completely rebuilt in the early 1880s: the East Wing was re-opened by Princess Helena in 1881 and the West Wing was re-opened by the Prince of Wales in 1885. In 1904, it adopted the name National Hospital for the Relief and Cure of the Paralysed and Epileptic.

The hospital served as a section of the First London General Hospital during the First World War and was renamed the National Hospital, Queen Square, for the Relief and Cure of Diseases of the Nervous System including Paralysis and Epilepsy by supplementary Royal Charter in 1926. The Queen Mary Wing was opened by Queen Mary in July 1938. During the Second World War the hospital was badly damaged by German bombing.

The hospital merged with the Maida Vale Hospital for Diseases of the Nervous System (founded by Julius Althaus as the London Infirmary for Epilepsy and Paralysis in 1866) in 1948, becoming the National Hospital for Nervous Diseases. The current name came into use in 1990. The hospital became part of University College London Hospitals NHS Foundation Trust in 1996.

== Services ==
The hospital includes 244 in-patient beds, and has nine operating theatres (including two angiography theatres). The neurology wards are named John Young and David Ferrier; the neurosurgical wards are named Victor Horsley, Bernard Sunley and Lady Ann Allerton. Nuffield ward accommodates private medical and surgical inpatients. There are neurological and neurosurgical intensive care units in the hospital. The two inpatient rehabilitation units are the Albany Rehabilitation Unit and Neurorehabilitation Unit. The main outpatient department is named in memory of Basil Samuels.

== National Brain Appeal ==
The National Brain Appeal is a charity which supports The National Hospital for Neurology and Neurosurgery, and the UCL Queen Square Institute of Neurology. It is formally named the National Hospital for Neurology and Neurosurgery Development Foundation, also referred to as the National Hospital Development Foundation. As of 2025, Jackie Ashley is the chair of the trustees.

== See also ==
- List of hospitals in England
- UCL Neuroscience
- UCL Partners
