= Dame Gertrude Young House =

- Hestia Housing and Support

Geography
- Location: Ealing, London, W5, United Kingdom
- Coordinates: 51°31′19″N 0°18′49″W

Organisation
- Type: Specialist

Services
- Speciality: Mental Health

History
- Founded: 1932; 94 years ago

Links
- Website: www.hestia.org/dame-gertrude-young-house-dgyh-mental-health-house-support
- Lists: Hospitals in the United Kingdom

Dame Gertrude Young House (DGYH) in Ealing, London, England, is a specialist mental health support unit in west London, providing accommodation, care and training for men at risk of homelessness.

== History ==
The Dame Gertrude Young Memorial Convalescent Home was founded in 1932 with an endowment by Colonel Sir John Smith Young, a friend of Florence Nightingale, in memory of his late wife Gertrude. Sir John dedicated 10 Castlebar Hill in Ealing as a convalescent home for the Central London Throat Nose & Ear Hospital. The building was opened in 1933 by Princess Louise, Duchess of Argyll.

In 1963, the convalescent home closed and the building became a geriatric hospital, under the auspices of the North West Metropolitan Regional Hospital Board, and later an admitting unit for surgical patients. In 1977, it was closed following the 1976 review of health services in west London, along with Brentford Hospital, the Western Hospital and St. Helena's Recovery Home.

Since 1984, it has operated as a specialist unit for men with mental health support needs, run by the charity Hestia Housing and Support.

== See also ==
- List of hospitals in England
