= Nuffield =

Nuffield may refer to:

- William Morris, 1st Viscount Nuffield, founder of Oxford-based Morris Motors and philanthropist
- Nuffield, Oxfordshire, a village in Oxfordshire, England and home of William Richard Morris from which he chose his title, Viscount Nuffield
- Nuffield Organization, William Morris's group of motor vehicle manufacturing businesses in the United Kingdom
- Nuffield Universal, a make of tractor produced by the Nuffield organisation from 1948
- Nuffield Press, a printing and publishing company formerly part of the Nuffield organisation

Institutions (some of the many) founded and endowed by Lord Nuffield from the profits of his businesses:

- Nuffield Foundation, a British charitable trust, established in 1943 by William Morris (Lord Nuffield)
- Nuffield College, Oxford, one of the constituent colleges of the University of Oxford in the United Kingdom
- Nuffield Trust, a charitable trust based in London, whose aim is to produce analysis and debate on UK healthcare policy
- Nuffield Health, a charity operating Nuffield Health Gyms, Hospitals, Medical Centres and Nurseries in the UK
- Nuffield Science Project, a project of the Nuffield Foundation to improve science education
- Nuffield Council on Bioethics, examines and reports on ethical issues raised by new advances in biological and medical research
- Nuffield Speech and Language Unit, a centre providing intensive therapy to children who suffer from severe speech and language disorders
- Nuffield Orthopaedic Centre, a hospital in Oxford
- Nuffield Centre for International Health and Development, resource for education, research and technical assistance in health and development
- Nuffield Radio Astronomy Laboratory, since 1999 Jodrell Bank Observatory
- Nuffield Respirator, "iron lung" designed by Robert Both manufactured by Nuffield and offered free of any charge to any hospital in the British Commonwealth that might request one
