= Benton Fletcher =

Music instrument collector

"Major G H Benton Fletcher (artist author and traveller) refused a public school education and became a licensed peddlar - the reason for this was that he wanted to study the conditions of doss houses at first hand - in his house in Holborn which was built by the first Duke of Devonshire - he has one of the finest collections of musical instruments in the world and he allows students to practise on them for a fee of sixpence an hour - his house is also the headquarters of the famous Tudor Singers and very often Major Benton Fletcher accompanies them during rehearsals on his historic instruments - photo shows Major G H Benton Fletcher playing the accompaniment for members of the Tudor Singers on one of his valuable instruments - a virginal of Queen Elizabeth period 24 October 1934"

Lord Allenby opened an exhibition of drawings of Royal Homes near London by Major Benton Fletcher. The picture shows Lord Allenby with Susan, Duchess of Somerset and Major Benton Fletcher. 3 December 1930

Major George Henry Benton Fletcher (22 October 1866 – 31 December 1944) was a collector of early keyboard instruments including virginals, clavichords, harpsichords, spinets and early pianos. His collection is currently housed and kept in playing condition by the National Trust in Fenton House, a late 17th century merchant's house in Hampstead, North London.

== Career ==
He was involved in social work in London slums from 1889 to 1899 with Octavia Hill and her Cadet Battalion, in a model social housing scheme in Red Cross Cottages, Southwark. During the Second Boer War and the First World War he served as a railway transport officer. He assisted Professor Flinders Petrie on excavations in Egypt and Palestine by drawing archaeological finds. He became an artist, a book illustrator, a writer and a traveller, drawing King Hussein bin Ali, Sharif of Mecca, who had invited him to Arabia in 1921, and made several expeditions to the Libyan, Hejaz and Sahara deserts. In 1934 he found an elegant but dilapidated Charles II town house called Old Devonshire House in Holborn. He bought, restored and furnished it with antiques and his growing collection of early keyboard instruments as a music centre for amateurs, students and professionals. He gave this and other houses and his collection of instruments to the National Trust in 1938. He became something of a social and press celebrity and raconteur giving talks on the BBC National Programme radio service in 1938-9 and early television broadcasts from Alexandra Palace featuring his stories and keyboard instruments in 1937-8. His art exhibitions, early musical instrument concerts and furniture collection were patronised by royalty, military and society figures.

Although he was called "the luckiest collector in the world", he was unlucky that Old Devonshire House was totally destroyed in a Luftwaffe bombing raid on Holborn, London in May 1941. However he had had the foresight to move most of his keyboard instruments, in January 1941, to Bourton-on-the-Hill in Gloucestershire for safe-keeping during the war and these survived with minimal damage.

== The Early Keyboard Collection ==
The keyboard instruments collected by Benton Fletcher include six English harpsichords from the second half of the eighteenth century. Two are from Burkat Shudi's workshop in Soho. One is a single manual model dated 1761 and the other is a double manual harpsichord, naming both Burkat Shudi and John Broadwood as makers, dated 1770. The later instrument is faced with amboyna burl wood and is among the most elaborate of late English harpsichords, featuring the Venetian swell patented by Shudi in the same year, a machine stop, six hand-stops and a pedal action, with five notes below FF. Three instruments from Kirckman in London include a single manual harpsichord by Jacob Kirckman of 1752, a simple instrument with only 2 sets of 8' strings, a double manual harpsichord by Jacob Kirckman of 1762 with "book-matched" walnut veneer panels, and a double manual instrument by Jacob and Abraham Kirckman of 1777. A Longman and Broderip, a single manual harpsichord, made by Thomas Culliford dated 1783, which was the first harpsichord acquired by Benton Fletcher, includes a buff stop and a pedal machine stop.

An anonymous Italian harpsichord of about 1590 with original jacks and keyboard is unusual having only one string per note. It has two split accidentals allowing either chromatic or selected lower bass notes to be played with the front or back component of the "same" key. The interior of the lid features a painting of Moses and Aaron in an Italianate landscape.

There are two bentside spinets. One, by John Hancock, London, is of late eighteenth century origin, with a single curve to the bentside. The other is unsigned, appears to be English and may have been made in 1742. It features a wing-shaped bent-side with a double curve as well as elegant ebony accidentals with a central ivory strip.

Three of the four virginals in his collection are Italian. The oldest and lightest, dated 1540 is by Marcus Siculus of Sicily. It includes a well preserved parchment rose of extravagant tracery, and is decorated with bone studs and symmetrical floral decoration. A more robustly made virginals attributed to Vincentius Pratensis was made in the late 16th or early 17th century. An unusual virginals attributed to Giovanni Celestini, Venice, also of late 16th or early 17th century construction has two rather than one string per note and a false inner-outer case, which is the custom of some Italian makers to make a case that looks as if a delicate inner instrument is lying within a protective outer case when in fact it is all one. Benton Fletcher said that he found this instrument in a cellar in Florence where it was being used as a carpenter's workbench. A late example of virginals by Robert Hatley, London, 1664, opens to reveal an inside lid and drop-down front painted with figures in 17th century dress in landscape, with applied gilt papers. There is an anonymous triple fretted German clavichord of late 17th or early 18th Century origin.

A grand piano inscribed Americus Backers, London, of the late 1770s is possibly an 18th-century "fake"; the instrument is genuine but it was probably not made by Backers. There is also a square piano of eighteenth origin by Christopher Ganer, London.

Instruments collected by Benton Fletcher and probably lost during the Luftwaffe raid on Holborn in 1941 include an early 16th-century Italian painted clavichord, and two grand pianos, one by Matthew and William Stodart of 1791 and the second by Kirckman of 1803. A 16th-century portable pipe organ and a larger pipe organ of 1754 by Merlin were also lost. A third spinet is described by Edgar Hunt. If it was in the collection, it may have been lost then as well.

In Fenton House there are four keyboard instruments acquired after the death of Benton Fletcher in 1944, which are now considered as part of the collection. There is an Ioannes Ruckers harpsichord of 1612 from Antwerp enlarged in England in the 18th century belonging to the Royal Collection, formerly housed in Windsor Castle, a square piano by John Broadwood of 1774, a grand piano by John Broadwood & Son, London, of 1805 and a clavichord by Arnold Dolmetsch, Haslemere, of 1925.

== Family and early life ==
His father, John Fletcher, was a successful milliner with a shop in Newington Causeway, Southwark. He married Emily Bush, the daughter of John Bush, a builder from Blackfriars, London. Benton Fletcher was the youngest of their four children. His father died in May 1874 when he was 7 and his mother died in June 1883, when he was 16. Emily Fletcher's estate was valued at £11,333. His eldest brother Sidney John Bush Fletcher became a stockbroker, his brother Percy George became an ironmonger with a shop at 58 High Street, Sidcup, and his sister Emily Jessie married a commercial traveller. His unusual third Christian name, Benton, by which he came to be known, was the surname of his grandmother Elizabeth Benton, who married Thomas Fletcher in 1817. His niece Margaret, daughter of Percy George Fletcher, became an early keyboard player. She married Alec Hodsdon, a noted maker of virginals. She gave a radio broadcast of music for the virginals two months before Benton Fletcher died in 1944. She also recorded on an LP music played on early keyboard instruments in the collection of the Victoria & Albert Museum.

== Octavia Hill, Cadets, Social work ==
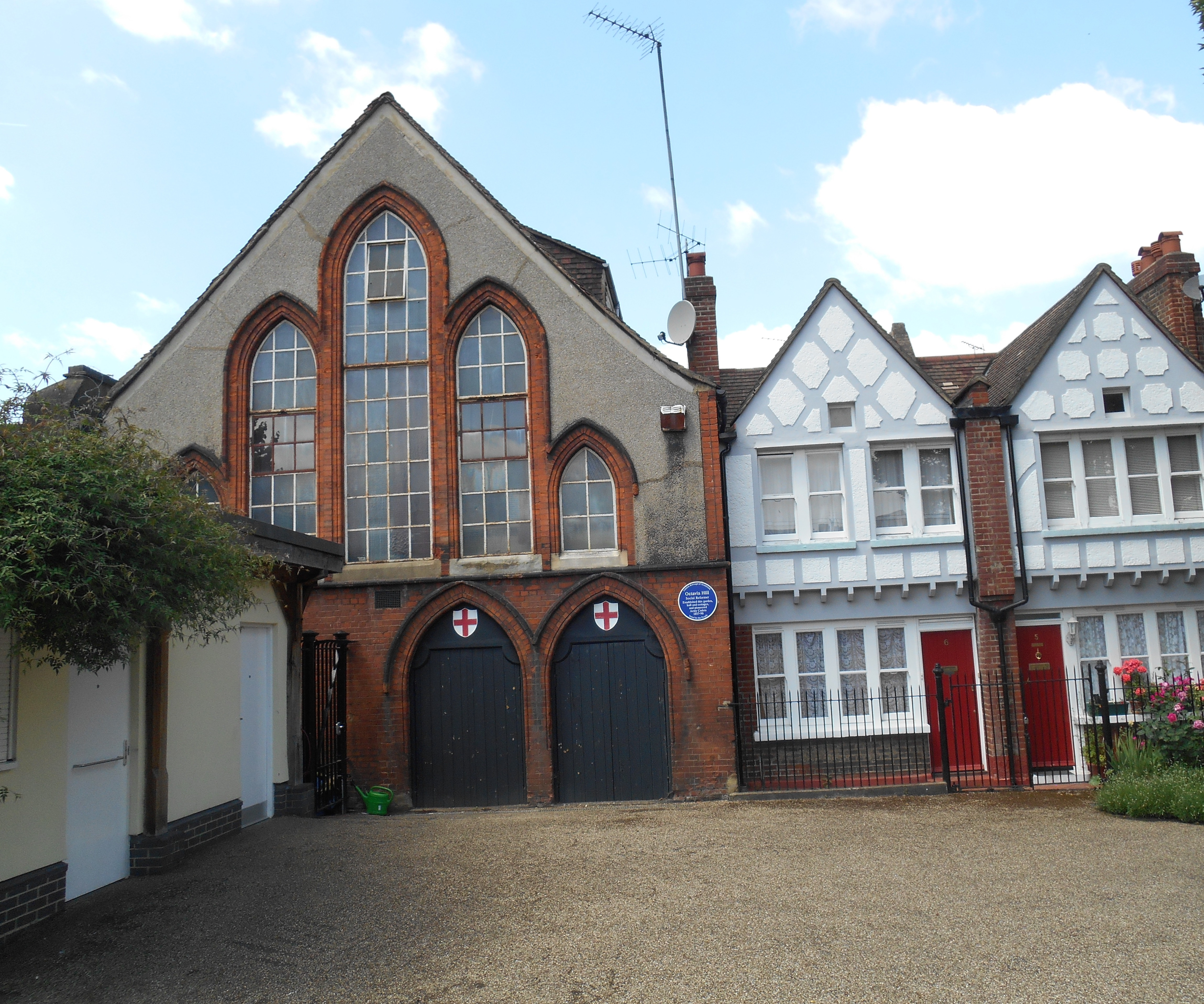
Red Cross Hall and Redcross Cottages 6 and 5

Octavia Hill, the social reformer, a moving force behind the development of social housing and a founder of the National Trust, exerted a strong influence on Benton Fletcher. In 1889 she pioneered the Cadet movement in South London as a means of improving the social conditions of working-class boys. Elijah Hoole, an Arts and Crafts movement architect, built the Cadets' Drill Hall, Red Cross Hall, which was decorated by Walter Crane, with painted panels of scenes of working class heroism, adjacent to Redcross Cottages and Red Cross Garden, Southwark. Red Cross Hall was also used for concerts, including a yearly performance of Handel's "Messiah". Benton Fletcher joined the Cadets as a junior officer in 1890 and lived in no 5 Red Cross Cottages in this street of social housing, two doors from the Red Cross Drill Hall. A letter from Octavia Hill in Jan 1891 expressed her approval of the physical and moral training of the cadets by "the gentlemen who are its officers", and mentions that "the band attached to the cadet corps has been taught by Mr Fletcher". Another letter dated February 1892 mentions "the present the working men's carving class have made... a beautiful clock case, carved by themselves and designed by Mr Fletcher". Later, in 1931, in a letter to Samuel Hield Hamer, (Secretary of the National Trust, 1911–34) about his scheme for giving his property and musical instrument collection to the National Trust, Benton Fletcher wrote: "it embraces education, pleasure and philanthropy, &, would I feel confident have appealed strongly to the late Octavia Hill and her sisters whose efforts to encourage the love and performance of old music fostered the like desire in my own mind during the twelve years I lived in the slums of Southwark working with & for these farseeing pioneers."

== Military career ==
Benton Fletcher in the uniform of a Major in the Sherwood Foresters (Nottingham and Derbyshire Regiment). His cap badge is that of the Sherwood Foresters and his sleeve markings are those of a British Army Major. He became a Major in 1905, the probable date of this photograph. Courtesy of the National Trust

Fletcher became an Honorary Second Lieutenant in the 1st Cadet Battalion, Queen's Royal West Surrey Regiment, on 22 March 1890. He served as an adjutant of the Cadet battalion from 1896 to 1903. He joined the 3rd (2nd Derbyshire Militia) Battalion, Sherwood Foresters, with a commission of Second Lieutenant on 11 February 1891, and was promoted to Lieutenant on 22 March 1893, to Captain on 24 April 1895 and to Major on 4 January 1905. When the Militia was converted to the Special Reserve in 1908, he joined the new Special Reserve of Officers, resigning in 1909. He joined up for active service in the Second Boer War in 1900 in the 1st Battalion of the South Lancashire Regiment and was gazetted to the Staff as a Railway Staff Officer in August 1900. He served on the Elandsfontein to Standerton line in the Transvaal from December 1900 until October 1901 when he was invalided back to England. He received the Queen's South Africa Medal "with three clasps". At the outbreak of the First World War he joined up, serving as a Recruiting Officer on 7 October 1914 and became a Railway Transport Officer on 12 October 1915, serving at Waterloo station until 1920.

== Egypt, Flinders Petrie, and Temple discovery in Abydos ==
He assisted as an artist drawing finds in Egypt during the winter excavation seasons from 1903–1914. He can be documented as being in Egypt Exploration Society camps in Beit Meir with Aylward Blackman, Abydos with Edouard Naville and Thomas Eric Peet and Meydum where he first met Flinders Petrie. Petrie thought well of Benton Fletcher, writing to his wife Hilda on Christmas Eve 1909: "Fletcher has been here ten days or so; he can draw very well, has painted much the last three years in Egypt with fine colouring, and he has taken keenly to all our pot and vase drawing. He is a thorough gentleman, accustomed to good society, and has done much on boy's clubs and living about the East End. I much hope to keep him about our camp in future". Benton Fletcher's Who's Who entry says: "Discovered single handed, Temple of Seti 1. Abydos, now in the Metropolitan Museum, New York". This can be substantiated by an editorial and a cover drawing by Benton Fletcher for the Journal of Egyptian Archaeology. Seti 1, who reigned from 1290-1279 BC, built this temple to honour his father, Ramesses 1, including fine bas-relief sculptures of himself and his father, who founded the successful nineteenth dynasty of ancient Egypt but reigned for only two years from 1292–1290 BC. An account of the strange acquisition and restoration of these subsequently damaged reliefs by John Pierpont Morgan (1837–1913) and Dikran Kelekian (1868–1951) for the Metropolitan Museum in New York, is given by Herbert Winlock.

== Musical connections ==
He had close connections with composers from the first decade of the 20th century, especially with Roger Quilter and Percy Grainger. In 1906-8 he met Delius, Elgar, Grieg and Sinding while sharing a house in Chelsea, 14 Upper Cheyne Walk, with the pianist and composer Percy Grainger and Grainger's mother Rose, He was nursed at Bawdsey Manor, the Quilter's family home after returning ill from Cairo in 1907 and later accompanied Roger Quilter and his parents on a holiday tour in 1908-9, staying with them in Taormina, Egypt, and Naples.

== Painting, exhibitions, drawings ==
Benton Fletcher had become Secretary of the Amateur Art Society by 1898. An exhibition of his watercolour paintings and drawings of Egypt was held at the Fine Art Society in New Bond Street in June and July 1914. Two paintings shown at this exhibition, Pyramids at Sunset in watercolour and Menmare Seti in pink watercolour, are in the collection of the Victoria and Albert museum. Ronald Storrs, the Governor of Jerusalem, opened an exhibition in Grosvenor Square in 1922 of his drawings of Jerusalem which was also shown in Jerusalem and Bath. A black chalk drawing of the Dome of the Rock, from the Mount of Olives, can be seen on-line in the Victoria and Albert museum. Others were published in his book "Jerusalem", written by Lionel Cust. Field Marshal Edmund Allenby in 1930 opened an exhibition of his drawings of "Royal Homes near London". He held an exhibition of drawings of places associated with the tercentenary of Samuel Pepys birth in 1933 in his house at 6 Buckingham Place. Fenton House contains a drawing by him of 3 Cheyne Walk, a painting of Rye Harbour, and a view of St Paul's Cathedral from the South Bank.

== Books and Illustrations ==
He produced illustrations for at least 15 books, mostly travel books or travel-guides.

Three prolific travel writers used his illustrations: Norma Lorimer, Mrs Steuart Erskine and Douglas Sladen, editor of Who's Who. Douglas Sladen and Norma Lorimer also wrote novels set in Egypt while Katherine Cockburn wrote a novel set in Jerusalem which Benton Fletcher also illustrated. Some of his book illustrations were in colour, but most were pencil or red crayon drawings. One book, "Arabia; Peeps at many Lands", was in an illustrated children's series published by A & C Black. He was able to commission authoritative writers to write texts around a group of his drawings. Sir Lionel Cust, Director of the National Portrait Gallery, wrote the text for Jerusalem and Aylward Blackman, an Egyptologist funded by the Egyptian Exploration Society wrote the text to the book on Luxor, with both authors acknowledging Benton Fletcher for initiating the enterprise. Benton Fletcher wrote the text as well as producing drawings for one book "Royal Homes Near London".

== His purchase and gift of houses to the National Trust ==
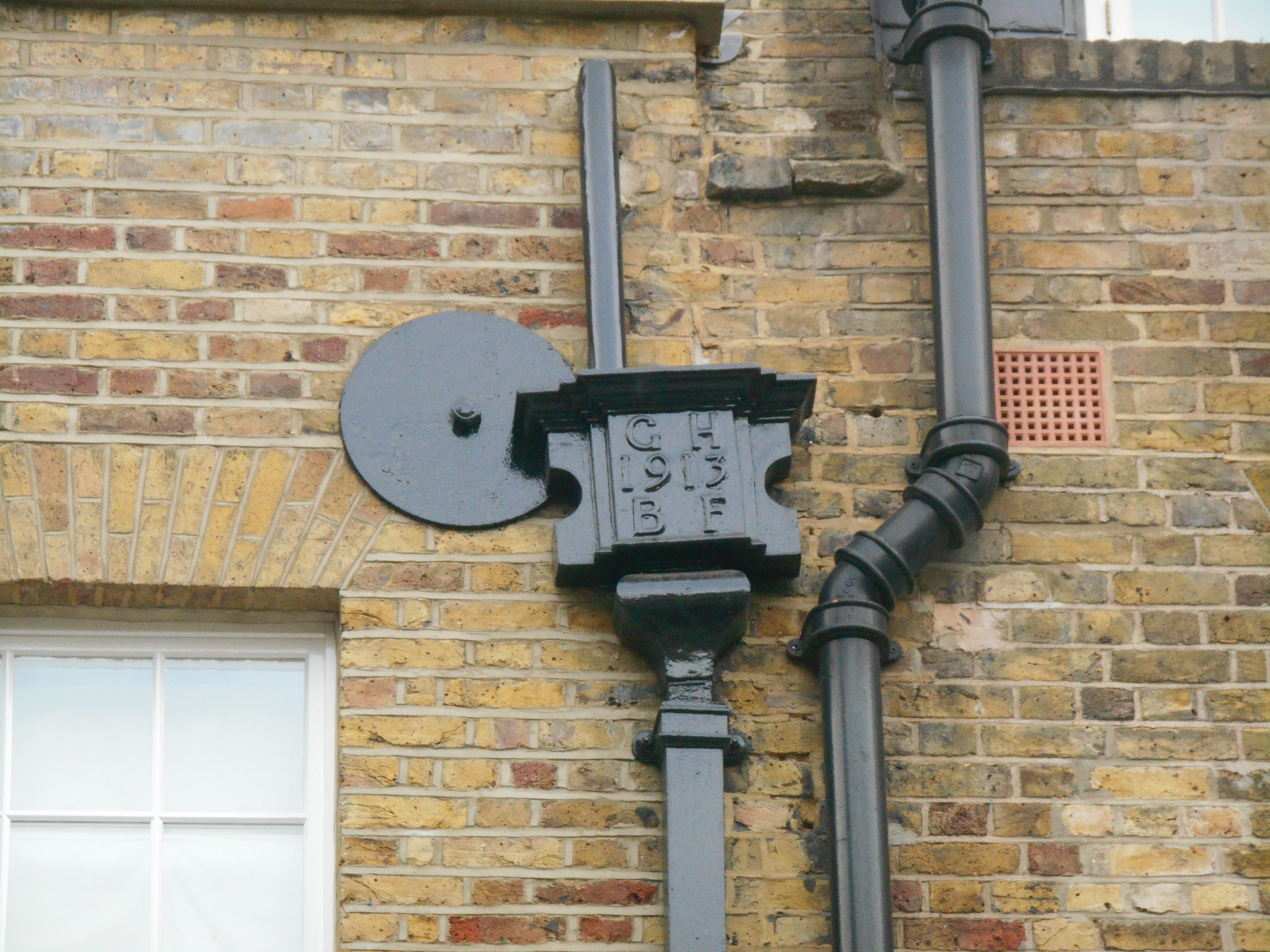
This unusual rain hopper at 6 Buckingham Place SW1, is dated 1913 and bears the initials GHBF. George Henry Benton Fletcher acquired this house in 1913 and gave it to the National Trust in 1937.

He bought 6 Buckingham Street (now Buckingham Place) SW1 in 1913, Cobham Hall with two adjacent cottages in about 1916 and Old Devonshire House in Holborn in 1934. As his collection of keyboard instruments grew, and his desire to develop a music centre around them, he housed the instruments in Lord Leighton's former studio in Leighton House (1932–34). In 1934, he bought, restored and furnished Old Devonshire House in Holborn, built in 1668 for William Cavendish, 3rd Earl of Devonshire, transferring his collection to this historic building to form a centre for early music. The National Trust had become interested in acquiring and protecting properties of historic interest as expressed in the 1937 National Trust Act. Benton Fletcher was an early donor under this scheme, donating Old Devonshire House, Holborn to the National Trust, with Cedars House Hotel and the other properties at Cobham, Surrey, adjacent to Cobham Mill and 6 Buckingham Place, SW1 in November 1937, as well as his collection of instruments and other items. "The income arising from the Cobham and Buckingham Place properties will be used partly to ensure the carrying on at Old Devonshire House of the centre started there by Major Benton Fletcher for the special study and performance of works of older English Composers". The terms of the gift were such that Benton Fletcher was able to continue to live at Old Devonshire House for the rest of his life. Following the destruction of Old Devonshire House in 1941, he found and purchased 3 Cheyne Walk, with the National Trust's approval: "With generous help from Major Fletcher, the Trust has been able to buy 3 Cheyne Walk", Chelsea for the exhibition of his instrument collection. His collection was moved to Fenton House, Hampstead in 1952.

== Death ==
His sudden and lonely death aged 78 at 3 Cheyne Walk on an unusually cold 31 December 1944 hunched in rigor mortis in his bed with a burnt out pan on an electric ring, was dramatically described by James Lees-Milne in his diary: "Give me V2s every minute rather than a repetition of this experience". He was buried in Brompton Cemetery. A nephew by marriage, probably Alec Hodsdon, was the only member of his family to attend his funeral, the three others present being Roger Quilter, James Lees-Milne and Donald MacLeod Matheson, the Secretary of the National Trust and the executor of his will. He left £47,783. His will provided for the endowment of a centre for the study of early keyboard and chamber music at the discretion of the National Trust.

== Conclusion ==
Major Benton Fletcher pioneered the idea of preserving early keyboard instruments so that they can be played and heard in surroundings of the right period. He was unusually enthusiastic that amateurs, students and professionals should all be encouraged to play original instruments. He saw Old Devonshire House and the collection as a living museum, and wished to establish it on a permanent basis by his gift to the National Trust. He understood the value to performers of exploring the physical characteristics of the instruments and that performers and listeners alike responded to the distinctive sound. He expressed the view that the music of Handel and Bach was not improved when performed on modern pianos and was disparaging about the lack of sonority of 20th century revival harpsichords. The National Trust tries to maintain a balance between the preservation of the instruments and their use.
