= Nuffield Speech and Language Unit =

Geography
- Location: 6 Castlebar Hill; Ealing, West London, England

Organisation
- Care system: NHS
- Type: Specialist
- Religious affiliation: None

Services
- Beds: 14
- Speciality: Dyspraxia

History
- Opened: 1971
- Closed: 2011

Nuffield Speech and Language Unit was an internationally recognised centre of excellence for providing intensive therapy to children with severe speech and language disorders such as Developmental Verbal Dyspraxia, dysarthria, and oral dyspraxia. The centre was located in Ealing, West London and was administered by the Royal Free Hampstead NHS Trust in collaboration with Royal National Throat, Nose and Ear Hospital. Nuffield specialized in helping children between ages four and seven overcome difficulties caused by dyspraxia and had a capacity for fourteen students. Many of the students would not have succeeded in the mainstream education system. Nuffield was closed in 2011 after the board of trustees decided the under-capacity centre was not financially viable.

== History ==
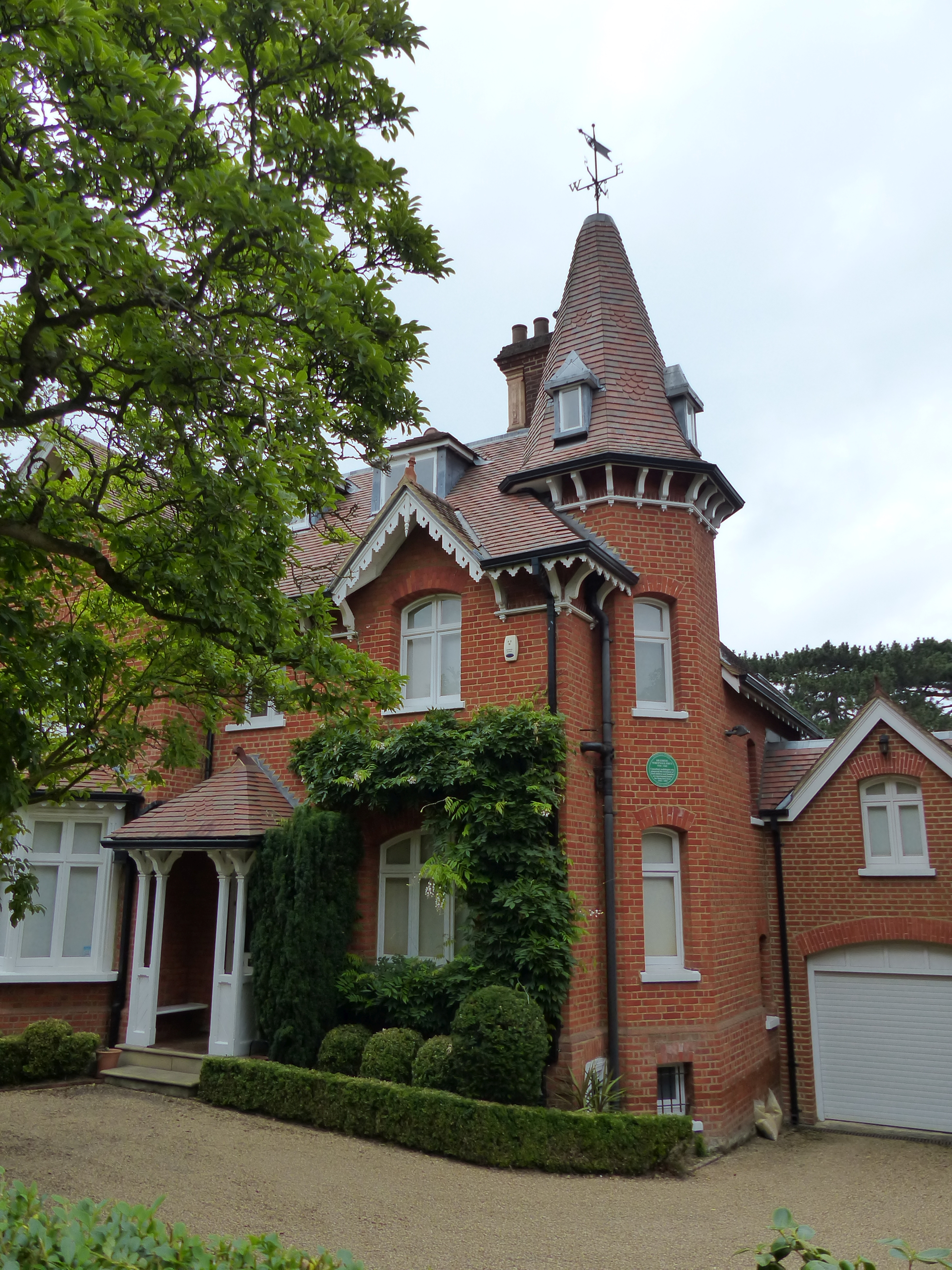
Dr. Edith Whetnall's house at 8 Castlebar Hill, next door to the Nuffield Unit

In 1947, Edith Whetnall established the Deafness Aid Clinic, one of the first clinics dedicated to deaf children, at the Royal National Throat Nose and Ear Hospital. In 1963, a grant from the Nuffield Foundation made it possible to establish the Nuffield Speech and Language Unit, of which Whetnall was made the first Director. This was built at a cost of £100,000 which was promised after a presentation to Lord Nuffield by Whetnall. Services began in 1971, initially as a boarding unit or hostel, but became a day school in 1996.

Patients could be diagnosed with dyspraxia or related disorders at the Nuffield Speech and Language Centre and referred to the Unit for care and instruction. As hearing problems became diagnosed earlier through better and more sensitive screening methods, the unit's specialty or expertise expanded to include disorders of speech and language. So as not to hold the children back educationally from their peers who could attend traditional schools, the unit then included an educational curriculum so as to ease the children's eventual transition into mainstream education. Students typically spent two years in the programme at Nuffield. Between 1998 and 2003, 41% of Nuffield's students went on to attend mainstream schools, while the other 59% attended specialist schools.

== Nuffield Dyspraxia Programme ==
In 1985, Nuffield Speech and Language Unit published the first edition of the Nuffield Dyspraxia Programme (NDP), which was meant to provide resources to therapists to diagnose and manage dyspraxia and related disorders. NDP is one of the few published approaches specifically for educating and therapizing children with developmental verbal dyspraxia.

== Closure ==
Nuffield faced closure starting in 2006 when the board of trustees decided that the unit, which served between ten and twelve students annually but had a capacity for fourteen, was not financially viable. Services were suspended in 2007 due to the lack of referrals that resulted from the potential of closure. Ealing PCT held a public consultation on the future of the Nuffield Speech and Language Unit, which closed in April 2011.
