= Graham Fraser (otolaryngologist) =

English ear, nose, and throat surgeon

- Born: 1 May 1936; London, England
- Died: 8 February 1994 (aged 57); London, England
- Education: Westminster School; Worcester College, Oxford
- Years active: 1961–1994
- Known for: Pioneering cochlear implantation in the United Kingdom
- Medical career
- Profession: Ear, nose and throat surgery consultant
- Field: Otolaryngology
- Institutions: Guy's Hospital; University College Hospital; Royal National Throat, Nose and Ear Hospital
- Research: Deafness
- Awards: WJ Harrison Prize (1993)

James Graham Farncombe Fraser (1 May 1936 – 8 February 1994) was an English otolaryngologist. He became known for his research for treatments of profoundly deaf people with cochlear implants.

== Biography ==
Born in London, Graham Fraser was the son of Arthur Fraser and a radiologist, Phyllis, (née Farncombe). Graham Fraser married epidemiologist Patricia Mary Thompson in 1963, and the couple had two daughters.

He obtained a Bachelor of Medicine, Bachelor of Surgery from Worcester College, Oxford, in 1961 and joined the Fellowship of the Royal Colleges of Surgeons in 1967. He spent his first ten years of medical practice at Guy's Hospital and University College Hospital, where he became an ear, nose and throat surgery consultant in 1971. He held this position for the remainder of his life. In 1973, he acquired the same position at the Royal National Throat, Nose and Ear Hospital.

Fraser was close to the Royal National Institute for the Deaf, and sought to cure profound and total hearing loss throughout his life. He became interested in cochlear implants after seeing early success of this procedure in the United States, and pioneered its implementation in the United Kingdom. Confronted with the National Health Service (NHS) management's scepticism toward cochlear implants, Fraser sought external funds to perform his research. He and his team published many scientific articles on the subject of ear health, and the treatment of deafness by surgery. His efforts led to the creation of a national cochlear implants program launched by David Mellor during the year he served as Minister of State for Health (1988–89).

Fraser's colleagues credit his success to his determination, charisma and persuasiveness. They also highlight his dislike for the traditional hospital hierarchy, and never accepted the title of "Chairman". He preferred a more democratic approach where each member of the team felt valued for their work. According to two obituaries, his demeanour fostered a close-knit team and a positive work environment.

Fraser died from cancer at age 57 on 8 February 1994. Following his death, Jack Ashley, Baron Ashley of Stoke, founded the Graham Fraser Foundation to help fund the continuation of the research he started. Jack Ashley himself received cochlear implants in 1993, and credits this procedure for improving his quality of life.
