= Edith Whetnall =

English ENT surgeon (1910–1965)

Edith Whetnall FRCS
- Dr Whetnall
- Born: 6 September 1910; Kingston upon Hull, England
- Died: 23 October 1965 (aged 55); Marylebone, London, England

Edith Aileen Maude Whetnall, FRCS (6 September 1910 – 23 October 1965) was an ear, nose and throat surgeon. She was known for her work with children who were almost profoundly deaf.

== Life ==
Whetnall was born in Hull on 6 September 1910 to the Reverend Arthur John and Eleanor (née Stormer) Whetnall. Her father was a Wesleyan minister. She qualified as a doctor from King's College, London in 1938 determined to specialise in ear, nose and throat conditions. The following year she married Dr Robert Barrie Niven, on 2 September 1939. Edith joined the Emergency Medical Service during the war. All through 1941 and until September 1945 she was helping Sir Victor Negus to do ear, nose, and throat surgery rising to the job of registrar at King's College Hospital, becoming a fellow of the Royal College of Surgeons and a master's qualification in surgery in 1944. In 1945 she was badly hurt in a car accident.

In 1947 she went to work for the Royal National Throat, Nose and Ear Hospital where she became the first director of what would become the Nuffield Hearing and Speech Centre. This was built at a cost of £100,000 which was promised after a presentation to Lord Nuffield by Whetnall. She also became the hearing consultant (otologist) to London County Council. She succeeded Terence Cawthorne who she had been working with since the war at Horton. She then collaborated with Dennis Fry and they would write two books together about the treatment of children who were deaf. Whetnall and Fry challenged the assumption that severely deaf children would not learn to speak. They had noticed that some profoundly deaf children did speak and this was because their mothers had recognised their condition early and they had spoken directly into their child's ear. This would be called auditory training. Whetnall believed that there were no children born deaf or at least very few who did not have some small residual hearing. This hypothesis was shown to be true as the few exceptions were usually due to disease.

1948 also saw the emergence of hearing aids that could be used to boost any child's remaining hearing making such an approach simpler. In 1953 she started a hostel in Ealing where mothers with deaf children could stay whilst their children were tested and the mother was given training. A second hostel followed in 1958 where older children could stay for some time.

The key point here was the early diagnoses as children developed their key hearing and speech skills in the first or second year. It was established that for the best chances of success then cochlear implants needed to be made whilst a child was very young. Whetnall believed that deaf children who were trained by empowered mothers would be able to attend standard schools with little or no support. Children who were trained in this achieved well in their education.

This approach brought Whetnall some opposition. Some people proposed that Deaf people should be allowed to establish their own culture where sign language can be seen as a primary means of communication and not a substitute language for "the disabled" but a fully functional first language. Irrespective of this criticism cochlear implants were successful even though they could be seen as treating deaf children as abnormal.

== Death and legacy ==
Whetnall died of myasthenia gravis in Marylebone on 23 October 1965 having published The Deaf Child with University College London Professor of Phonetics, D.B.Fry, the year before. In 1970 another book was published by Whetnall and Fry titled Learning to Hear. The publication was assisted by her widower Dr Robert Niven.
