= Ronald Hinchcliffe =

Professor Ronald Hinchcliffe (20 February 1926, Bolton – 5 January 2011, Hitchin) was a British audiovestibular physician and academic. He was a founding father of the speciality of audiological (audiovestibular) medicine, the systematic scientific study of disorders of hearing and balance.
