= Dikran Kelekian =

American art collector (1867–1951)

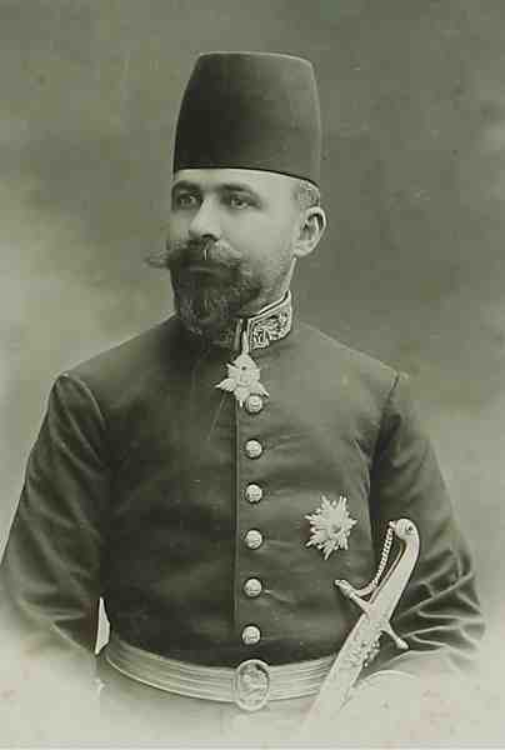
- Born: December 27, 1867
- Died: January 1951 (aged 83)
- Known for: collecting and dealing in Islamic art

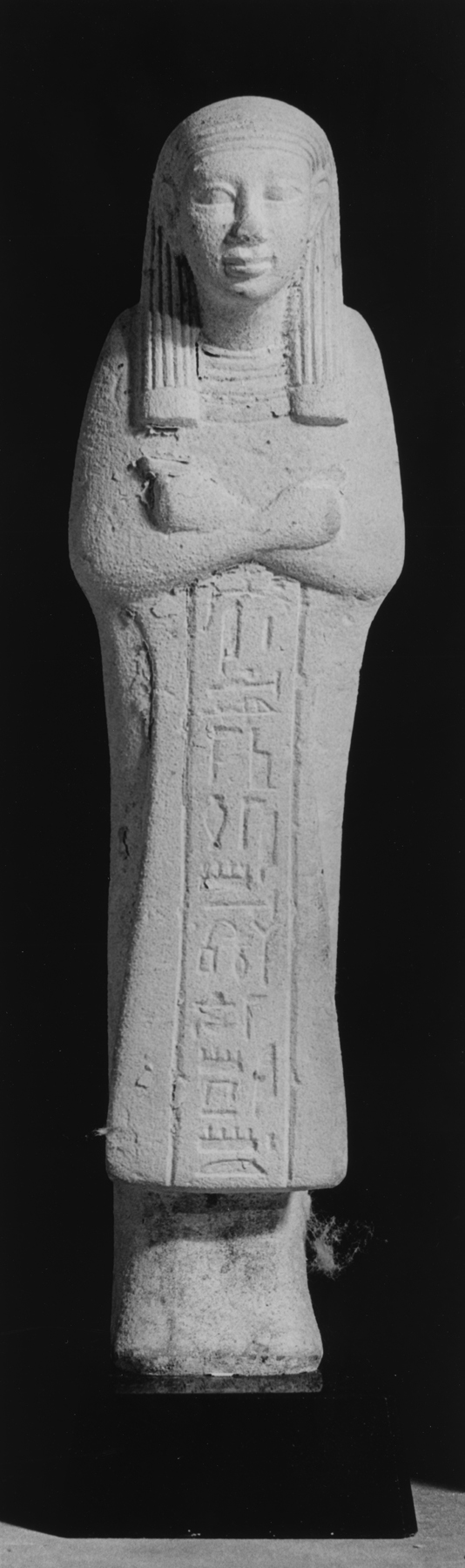
This ancient Egyptian ushabti, created between 1550 and 1069 BC, was originally acquired by Dikram Kelekian before it was in the collection of the Walters Art Museum

Dikran Kelekian (December 27, 1867 – January 1951) was a notable collector and dealer of Islamic art. The son of an Armenian banker from Kayseri, Dikran Kelekian and his brother Kevork set themselves up in the antiquities business in Istanbul in 1892. The next year, Dikiran came to the United States as a commissioner for the Persian Pavilion at the World's Columbia Exposition in Chicago. He soon established shops in New York, Paris, London, and Cairo, where he and his brother flourished as vendors selling works of art and antiquities.

In 1900, Kelekian apparently served as a member of the jury for the Universal Exposition in Paris, and in 1903 he lent a number of his works to the Exposition of Muslim Arts at the Musee des Arts Decoratifs, which was also in Paris. The following year, he participated in the 1904 St. Louis World's Fair, mounting a large display of his wares and accompanying the display with an illustrated catalogue. Already by this time Kelekian seems to have been recognized by the shah of Iran for his efforts to promote Persian art and culture, and he had added the honorific title of Khan between his first and last names.

Eventually, Kelekian became an American citizen, adding another country of allegiance to those of his heritage (Armenia), his birth (Turkey), and his professional interest and recognition (Iran).

An expert in Islamic, and particularly Persian, pottery, he was actively involved in the sale of medieval Islamic ceramics following the finds in Rayy in the late 1880s to early 1890s, as well as the excavations begun in Raqqa in 1896 and Sultanabad and Varamin in 1905.

One author sketched his character like so: "He is a creature so curiously compounded that, under his grim and sometimes awesome visage, he combines, in one person, the qualities of a Persian satrap and a properly accredited archangel, of Genghis Khan and the Chevalier Bayard, of Thor, the God of Thunder and Saint Francis of Assisi."

Kelekian was a member of the Central Board of Directors of the Armenian General Benevolent Union (AGBU) and in 1909 he funded an AGBU orphanage bearing his name in Deort Yol (in modern-day Turkey) for Armenian refugees fleeing the Adana massacre.

He was also a major donor to AGBU's various activities to save Armenians that survived the Armenian genocide.

Kelekian died in January 1951 when he fell from the twenty-third floor of the Hotel St. Moritz in New York.
