= Royal National Throat, Nose and Ear Hospital =

- University College London Hospitals NHS Foundation Trust
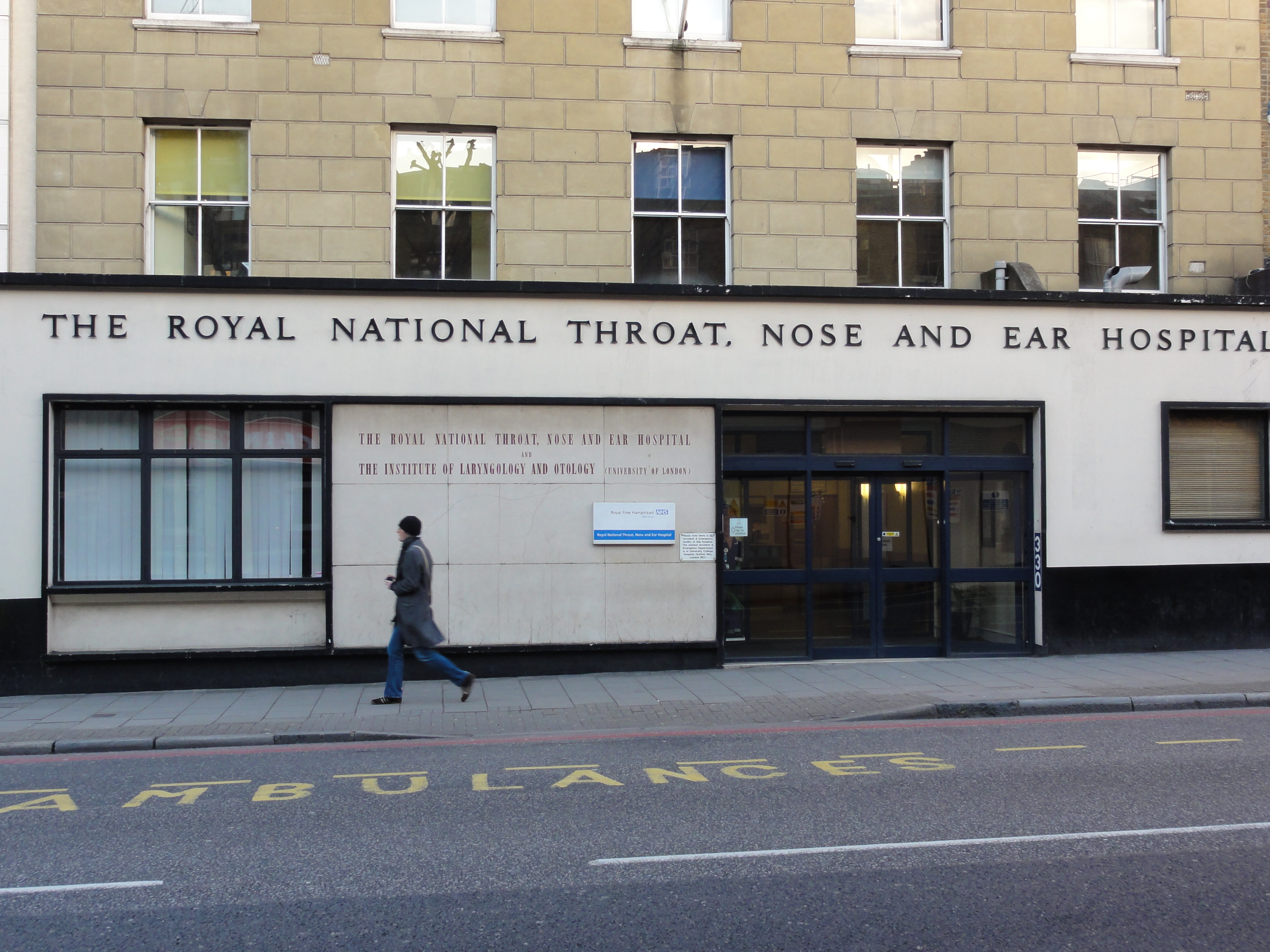
- Royal National Throat, Nose and Ear Hospital

- Shown in Camden

Geography
- Location: London, WC1; United Kingdom
- Coordinates: 51°31′45″N 0°07′09″W

Organisation
- Care system: NHS England
- Type: Specialist
- Affiliated university: University College London

Services
- Emergency department: No
- Speciality: Otolaryngology

History
- Founded: 1874; 152 years ago

Links
- Website: www.uclh.nhs.uk/OurServices/OurHospitals/RNTNE/Pages/Home.aspx

The Royal National Throat, Nose and Ear Hospital (the RNTNEH) was a health facility on Gray's Inn Road in London. It closed in October 2019 when services transferred to the new Royal National ENT and Eastman Dental Hospitals on Huntley Street, London, WC1E 6DG. The Huntley Street hospital continues to provide specialist ENT, sleeps and allergy services and is part of University College London Hospitals NHS Foundation Trust.

The hospital's motto is Audient surdi mutique loquentur (the deaf shall hear and the mute shall speak).

== History ==
The hospital was founded in 1874 by Lennox Browne, Llewellyn Thomas, Alfred Hutton, George Wallis and Ernest Turner. The hospital initially opened in Manchester Street (now Argyle Street), but demand for its services was such that new premises were acquired on Gray's Inn Road: the foundation stone was laid by Adelina Patti, a leading singer, in 1875. The new facility opened, as the Central London Throat Nose and Ear Hospital, in 1877. A new wing was opened by Princess Louise, Duchess of Argyll in 1906. She also laid the foundation stone for the Princess Louise Wing which was built between 1928 and 1929.

In January 1942 the hospital was amalgamated with the Hospital for Diseases of the Throat in Golden Square to form The Royal National Throat Nose and Ear Hospital. It then joined the National Health Service in 1948.

In April 1991 the Royal Free Hampstead NHS Trust, comprising the Royal Free Hospital and the Royal National Throat Nose and Ear Hospital, became one of the first NHS trusts established under the provisions of the NHS and Community Care Act 1990.

In April 2012, University College London Hospitals NHS Foundation Trust took over management of the hospital from the Royal Free Hampstead NHS Trust.

In October 2019 UCLH opened a new hospital in Huntley Street to house the Royal National Throat, Nose and Ear Hospital and the Eastman Dental Hospital and many departments moved there. Following the COVID-19 Pandemic the remaining wards, operating theatre and sleep unit were shut down earlier than planned and moved to the new hospital and UCLH. The original site at 330 Gray's Inn Road is now closed. The Ear Institute remains in place for research and teaching.

There are two notable pieces of art in the entrance: on the left there is a plaque commemorating the Royal Ear Hospital as a memorial to the parents of Geoffrey Duveen, by Felix Joubert, and on the right there is a carving of St. Blaise, by Cecil Thomas.

== Services ==
The following services are currently provided at the new Royal National ENT and Eastman Dental Hospitals on Huntley Street:

- allergy and medical rhinology
- audiological medicine and neuro-otology
- cochlear implants
- ear, nose and throat services
- hearing therapy
- rhinology
- rhinoplasty and facial plastic surgery
- snoring and sleep disorders
- speech and language therapy

== Research ==
The hospital is Europe's research centre for audiological medicine.

== Notable people ==
- Graham Fraser, consultant and pioneer of cochlear implants in the United Kingdom.
- Professor Ronald Hinchcliffe was a consultant at the hospital in the 1960s, where he established a vestibular research laboratory.
- Edith Whetnall led the way in treating the deaf.

== See also ==
- Healthcare in London
- List of hospitals in England
