= 1987 New Year Honours =

British royal recognitions

The New Year Honours 1987 were appointments by most of the Commonwealth realms of Queen Elizabeth II to various orders and honours to reward and highlight good works by citizens of those countries, and honorary ones to citizens of other countries. They were announced on 31 December 1986 to celebrate the year passed and mark the beginning of 1987 in the United Kingdom, Australia, New Zealand, Barbados, Mauritius, Fiji, Grenada, Papua New Guinea, Tuvalu, St Lucia, St Vincent & The Grenadines, Belize, Antigua & Barbuda, and St Christopher & Nevis.

The recipients of honours are displayed here as they were styled before their new honour, and arranged by honour, with classes (Knight, Knight Grand Cross, etc.) and then divisions (Military, Civil, etc.) as appropriate.

== United Kingdom ==
=== Life Peers ===
- Field Marshal Sir Edwin (Noel Westby) Bramall, G.C.B., O.B.E., M.C., Lord Lieutenant of Greater London and former Chief of Defence Staff.
- Sir Woodrow (Lyle) Wyatt, chairman, Horserace Totalisator Board.

=== Privy Counsellors ===
- Geoffrey Edwin Pattie, M.P., Minister of State, Department of Trade and Industry. Member of Parliament Chertsey and Walton.
- Robin (Robert) Leigh-Pemberton, Governor, Bank of England.
- David Charles Waddington, Q.C., M.P., Minister of State, Home Office. Member of Parliament Ribble Valley.

=== Knights Bachelor ===
- John Derek Alun-Jones, managing director, Ferranti plc. For services to Export.
- Bernard Albert Ashley, chairman, Laura Ashley plc.
- William Jeffrey Benson, chairman, Export Guarantees Advisory Council. For services to Export.
- Peter Spencer Bowness, C.B.E., D.L. For political and public service.
- Zachry Brierley, C.B.E. For political and public service.
- Keith Bright, chairman and Chief Executive, London Regional Transport.
- John Harrison Burnett, Principal and Vice-Chancellor, University of Edinburgh.
- Albert Raymond Maillard Carr, Historian.
- Peter Maxwell Davies, C.B.E., Composer
- Professor Eric James Denton, C.B.E., For services to Marine Biology.
- John Alexander Dick, M.C., Lately Sheriff Principal, Glasgow and Strathkelvin.
- Professor Herbert Livingston Duthie, Provost, University of Wales College of Medicine.
- Robert Grieve (Robin) Duthie, C.B.E., chairman, Scottish Development Agency.
- Arnold Elton, C.B.E. For political and public service.
- Alexander MacPherson Fletcher, M.P. For political service.
- Francis Ross (Frank) Gibb, C.B.E., chairman and Chief Executive, Taylor Woodrow Group.
- Peter Alfred Graham, O.B.E., chairman, Crown Agents.
- Robert Louis Hargroves, C.B.E., D.L. For political service.
- The Right Honourable Bernard John (Barney) Hayhoe, M.P. For political service.
- Dennis Marcus Landau, Chief Executive, Co-operative Wholesale Society Ltd.
- John Roger Lovill, C.B.E., D.L., Lately Chairman, Association of County Councils.
- (David) Carol (Macdonell) Mather, M.C., M.P. For political service.
- Peter Anthony Newsam, chairman, Commission for Racial Equality.
- David Gerald Scholey, C.B.E., chairman, Mercury International Group plc.
- John Marks Templeton, For charitable services.
- David John Weatherall, Nuffield Professor of Clinical Medicine, University of Oxford.
- Mark Aubrey Weinberg, Lately Chairman, Marketing of Investments Board Organising Committee.
- Robert Donald Wilson, chairman, Mersey Regional Health Authority.

Diplomatic and Overseas

- Peter Austin Philip Jermyn Allen, lately Chief Justice of Uganda.
- Oswald Victor Cheung, C.B.E., Q.C., J.P. For public services in Hong Kong.

=== Order of the Bath ===
==== Knight Grand Cross (GCB) ====
Military Division

Royal Navy

- Admiral Sir Nicholas John Streynsham Hunt K.C.B. L.V.O.

Army

- General Sir Roland Guy, K.C.B., C.B.E., D.S.O., A.D.C, Gen. (397265), late The Royal Green Jackets, Colonel Commandant Small Arms School Corps.

==== Knight Commander (KCB) ====
Military Division

- Vice Admiral John Jeremy Black, D.S.O., M.B.E.
- Vice Admiral John Julian Robertson Oswald.
- Lieutenant General Jeremy Calcott Reilly, D.S.O. (433223), Colonel The Royal Regiment of Fusiliers.
- Air Marshal Brendan James Jackson, Royal Air Force.

Civil Division

- (Andrew) Gordon Manzie, C.B., Second Permanent Secretary and Chief Executive, Property Services Agency.

==== Commander (CB) ====
Military Division

Royal Navy

- Rear Admiral John Burgess, L.V.O.
- Rear Admiral Richard George Heaslip.
- Rear Admiral Kenneth Arthur Snow.

Army

- Major General Thomas Anthony Boam, C.B.E. (424271), late Scots Guards.
- Major General Ralph John Crossley, C.B.E. (423988), late Royal Regiment of Artillery (now retired).
- Major General John David Whitlock Goodman (424336), late Royal Regiment of Artillery.
- Major General Richard Charles Keightley (430349), Colonel 5th Royal Inniskilling Dragoon Guards.
- Major General Brian Livesey (430931), late Royal Army Medical Corps (now retired).
- Major General Gordon Richard Oehlers (455486), late Royal Corps of Signals.

Royal Air Force

- Air Vice-Marshal Dennis Allison, Royal Air Force.
- Air Vice-Marshal George Philip Black, O.B.E., A.F.C., Royal Air Force.
- Air Vice-Marshal John Francis Humphrey Tetley, C.V.O., Royal Air Force.
- Air Vice-Marshal Terence Philip White, Royal Air Force.

Civil Division

- Albert Bennett Fallows, Chief Valuer, Board of Inland Revenue.
- Loudon Pearson Hamilton, Secretary, Department of Agriculture and Fisheries for Scotland.
- Graham Allan Hart, Deputy Secretary, Department of Health and Social Security.
- Gerald Albery Hosker, Deputy Treasury Solicitor.
- John Richard Jameson, Lately Under Secretary, Department of Education and Science.
- Garth John Jenkins, Legal Adviser, Ministry of Agriculture, Fisheries and Food.
- John Alfred Johnson, Foreign and Commonwealth Office.
- Joan Kelley, Under Secretary, HM Treasury.
- John Lowell Kilgour, Director, Prison Medical Service, Prison Department, Home Office.
- Michael Cooper Neale, Assistant Under Secretary, Ministry of Defence.
- John David Rimington, Director General, Health and Safety Executive.
- Oscar Roith, Chief Engineer and Scientist, Department of Trade and Industry.
- James Mackenzie Tudhope, Regional Procurator Fiscal, Glasgow and Strathkelvin.
- Reginald Gordon Harry Watson, Director, Building Research Establishment, Department of the Environment.
- Ronald Weston, Under Secretary, Board of Customs and Excise.
- Robert Fellowes, L.V.O., Deputy Private Secretary to The Queen.

=== Order of St Michael and St George ===
==== Knight Grand Cross (GCMG) ====
- Sir Julian Bullard, K.C.M.G., H.M. Ambassador, Bonn.

==== Knight Commander (KCMG) ====
- Christopher John Audland, C.M.G., lately Director-General for Energy, Commission of the E.C., Brussels.
- Martin Kenneth Ewans, C.M.G., British High Commissioner, Lagos.
- Arthur David Saunders Goodall, C.M.G., Foreign and Commonwealth Office.
- Jeremy Cashel Thomas, C.M.G., H.M. Ambassador, Athens.
- John Burns Ure, C.M.G., L.V.O., H.M. Ambassador, Brasilia.

==== Commander (CMG) ====
- John Lewis Roberts, Assistant Under Secretary, Ministry of Defence.
- Robert John Alston, H.M. Ambassador, Muscat.
- John Allan Birch, Deputy Permanent Representative, U.K. Mission to the United Nations, New York.
- Graham Stuart Burton, Foreign and Commonwealth Office.
- Charles David Stephen Drace-Francis, H.M. Chargé d'Affaires, Kabul.
- Maurice Anthony Foley, lately Deputy Director-General for Development Co-operation, Commission of the E.C., Brussels.
- Peter Edward Hall, lately Foreign and Commonwealth Office.
- Peter William Heap, Minister, British High Commission, Lagos.
- Alastair James Carl Euan Rellie, Foreign and Commonwealth Office.
- Stanley Stephenson, lately British Consul-General, Vancouver.
- Michael Logan Tait L.V.O., H.M. Ambassador, Abu Dhabi.
- Edward Mark West, lately Deputy Director-General, F.A.O., Rome.

=== Royal Victorian Order ===
==== Knight Grand Cross (GCVO) ====
- The Right Honourable John d'Henin, Baron Hamilton of Dalzell, K.C.V.O., M.C.

==== Knights Commander (KCVO) ====
- John Charles Batten.
- William Reginald James Pullen, C.V.O.

==== Commanders (CVO) ====
- Major Shane Gabriel Basil Blewitt, L.V.O.
- Major Robert Anthony Gordon Courage, L.V.O., M.B.E.
- David Gordon Illingworth, L.V.O.

==== Lieutenants (LVO) ====
- The Reverend Canon Anthony Douglass Caesar.
- Peter Edwin Curnow.
- Percival William Flaxman.
- John Patrick Kyle, M.V.O.
- Gavin George Newing Mackenzie.
- The Reverend Canon John Gervase Maurice Walker Murphy.
- Victor Leslie Seyd.

==== Members (MVO) ====
- Derek Chappell, R.V.M.
- Elizabeth, Mrs. Craig-Cooper.
- Richard Laurence Day, R.V.M.
- Captain Peter Marsden Heming, Royal Marines.
- Gordon Albert Hiscock.
- Vernon George Jewell.
- Miss Rosemary Winifred Menzies.
- Inspector Frank Graham Smith, Metropolitan Police.
- Reginald Ernest Willson.
- Jennifer Murray, Mrs. Band.
- Joseph Cowell.
- Glyn George.
- Ian Kenneth Gray.

=== Companions of Honour ===
- Sydney Brenner, For services to Molecular Biology.
- Sir John Newenham Summerson, C.B.E., For services to the history of Architecture.

=== Order of the British Empire ===
==== Dames Commander (DBE) ====
- Penelope Jessel. For political service.
- Jean Iris Murdoch, C.B.E. (Mrs Bayley), Novelist.
- Simone Ruth, Mrs. Prendergast, O.B.E., D.L. For political and public service.
- Sheila Margaret Imelda Quinn, C.B.E. Lately President, Royal College of Nursing.

==== Knights Commander (KBE) ====
Military Division

- Vice Admiral Hugh Leslie Owen Thompson.
- Lieutenant General Charles Patrick Ralph Palmer, C.B.E. (430407), Colonel The Argyll and Sutherland Highlanders (Princess Louise's).

Civil Division

- Sir Terence (Norman) Beckett, C.B.E., Lately Director General, Confederation of British Industry.
- Robert Andrew, Viscount Caldecote, D.S.C., chairman, Investors in Industry Group plc.
- Professor Richard Oswald Chandler Norman, Chief Scientific Adviser, Ministry of Defence.
- Professor Sir (Henry) Peter (Francis) Swinnerton-Dyer Bt., chairman, University Grants Committee.

==== Commanders (CBE) ====
Military Division

Royal Navy

- Commodore Michael Verney Nigel Bradford RD*, Royal Naval Reserve.
- Colonel Andrew Bernard Harfield, A.D.C.
- Captain David Pentreath, D.S.O., Royal Navy.

Army

- Colonel Michael Brenton Haliburton Ashmore, O.B.E. (465723), late The Royal Scots (The Royal Regiment).
- Colonel William James Hiles (424355), late The Royal Irish Rangers (27th (Inniskilling) 83rd and 87th).
- Colonel John Charles Holman, O.B.E. (457182), Deputy Colonel The Queen's Regiment.
- Colonel Harry John Lowles, M.B.E. (436567), late The Worcestershire and Sherwood Foresters Regiment.
- Colonel John Donald Macdonald, O.B.E. (457210), late Royal Corps of Transport.
- Colonel Philip John Sanders (474051), late Royal Tank Regiment.
- Colonel Hugh Nicholas Tarver (457286), late The Queen's Regiment.
- Colonel Paul Francis Wilson, O.B.E. (430489), late The King's Regiment, Territorial Army (now retired).

Royal Air Force

- Group Captain Anthony John Chetwynd Balfour, Royal Air Force.
- Air Commodore Reginald Thomas Dawson, Royal Air Force.
- Group Captain John Donald Drysdale, O.B.E., Royal Air Force.
- Air Commodore Donald James Harrison, Royal Air Force.
- Air Commodore Robert John Honey, Royal Air Force.

Civil Division

- Anthony Victor Alexander, Director, Sedgwick Group plc.
- Peter Winder Allsebrook, D.L., Chairman, TNT (UK) Ltd.
- Robert John Attwell, Grade 5, Ministry of Agriculture, Fisheries and Food.
- Alan Ayckbourn, Playwright.
- Douglas Claude Back. For political and public service.
- (James) David Francis Barnes, Chairman, Pharmaceuticals Economic Development Committee.
- Joseph Gray Bell, Chairman and Managing Director, Richards (Shipbuilders) Ltd.
- Professor Peter Martin Biggs, Director, Houghton Poultry Research Station, Huntingdon.
- Roger Birch, Q.P.M., Chief Constable, Sussex Police.
- Thomas Renfrew Bone. For services to Education in Scotland.
- John Morton Boyd. For services to the conservation of the natural environment in Scotland.
- Frederick Gordon Brook-Shepherd, Author and Journalist. Lately Chief Assistant Editor, Sunday Telegraph.
- John Lawson Broome, Chief Executive, Alton Towers Ltd.
- Kenneth Cameron, Professor of English Language; Head of Department of English Studies, University of Nottingham.
- (Walter) Menzies Campbell, Q.C. For political and public service.
- Paul Clark Eddington, Actor.
- Charles Nigel Clarke, Chairman, Bristol and Weston Health Authority.
- Stanley George Gurney Clarke, O.B.E. For services to the Newspaper Industry.
- Eileen Marie Lucy Cole, Member, Post Office Board
- Michael Graeme Compton, Keeper of Museum Services, Tate Gallery.
- Professor Rosemary Jean Cramp, Commissioner, Historic Buildings and Monuments Commission for England.
- Joseph Henry Crouch, Lately Director, Marketing, Cable & Wireless plc
- Edward Horder Cullinan, Senior Partner, Edward Cullinan, Architects.
- Cyril James Davies, Lately Chief Executive, Newcastle upon Tyne City Council.
- Alistair Jowett Dewhirst, Chairman and Chief Executive, I. J. Dewhirst Holdings plc.
- Benjamin Charlesworth Ralph Dodsworth, D.L., Under Sheriff of Yorkshire.
- William Brian Dunn, Managing Director, British Wool Marketing Board.
- Harold Ellis, Professor of Surgery, Charing Cross and Westminster Medical School, University of London.
- Dewi Ieuan Evans, Grade 4, Department of Transport.
- Robert Evans, Chief Executive, British Gas plc.
- Norman Gerald Dickson Ferguson, Chairman, Northern Ireland Housing Executive.
- Peter Firmston-Williams, O.B.E., Chairman, Covent Garden Market Authority.
- Donald Fisher, County Education Officer, Hertfordshire.
- Donald Logan Forbes. For political and public service.
- Peter Basil Fraser, Lately Assistant Secretary-General, Western European Union.
- Richard Anthony Garrett, Chairman, National Association of Boys' Clubs.
- Philip James Grimmer, O.B.E. For political and public service.
- Professor Michael John Hampshire, Chairman, Department of Electronic and Electrical Engineering, University of Salford.
- Alan George Hatchett, Deputy Chairman, Peninsular and Oriental Containers Ltd.
- Nigel Barnard Hawthorne, Actor.
- Doreen Valerie Hayward, Chief Nursing Officer, Department of Health and Social Security.
- Susan (Ruby Evelyn), Mrs. Hill. For political service.
- Ronald Sidney Hope, O.B.E., Lately Director, Marine Society.
- John Horsley Hose. For services to the agricultural industry.
- Donald Hamilton Irvine, O.B.E., Lately Chairman of Council, Royal College of General Practitioners.
- Sheelagh Jefferies, Deputy Director General, Central Office of Information.
- Peter Michael Jefford, Director, National Audit Office.
- Professor Norman Alan Jepson, Academic Adviser, Prison Service College.
- John Elfed Jones, Chairman, Welsh Water Authority.
- Austen Steven Kark, Lately Managing Director, External Broadcasting, British Broadcasting Corporation.
- Rachel Walley, Mrs. Kelly, O.B.E. For services to the National Health Service.
- Warburton Richard Knight, Member, Technical and Vocational Education Initiative, National Steering Group.
- Derrick Alfred Larkins, Chairman, Lansing Ltd.
- Penelope Ann, Mrs. Lee, Grade 5, Home Office.
- John Lyles, Chairman and Chief Executive, S. Lyles plc.
- Professor Alistair George James Macfarlane. For services to Engineering.
- Kenneth Leslie Maidment, President, British Film and Television Producers Association, Ltd.
- Geoffrey Alan Marr, Chairman, J. Marr and Son Ltd.
- David Kean Mason, Professor of Oral Medicine, University of Glasgow.
- Brian John McMaster, General Administrator, Welsh National Opera.
- James Lauder Millar, Managing Director, William Low and Company plc.
- John Clifford Nicholson, Deputy Controller of Audit, Audit Commission for Local Authorities in England and Wales.
- George Maitland Nissen. For services to the Stock Exchange.
- John Henry Northard, O.B.E., Operations Director, British Coal.
- Robert Stephen O'Brien, Chief Executive, Business in the Community.
- Trevor Bryan Owen, Managing Director, Remploy Ltd.
- Christopher Frederick Payne, Q.P.M., D.L., Chief Constable, Cleveland Constabulary.
- Penelope Ellison, Mrs. Phillips, M.B.E. For political and public service.
- Alick Michael Rankin, Group Chief Executive, Scottish and Newcastle Breweries plc.
- Simon Denis Rattle, Conductor.
- Owen James Rich, Deputy Chairman, Alfred McAlpine plc.
- (David) Gwilym Morris Roberts, Senior Partner, John Taylor and Sons.
- Victor Alfred Baden Rogers, Corporate Technical Staff Director, Westland pic.
- Esmond Patrick Thomson Roney, Chief Commoner, City of London.
- William Mackie Ross, T.D., D.L., Lately President, Royal College of Radiologists.
- The Honourable (Walter) Garrison Runciman, chairman, Walter Runciman plc.
- Joyce Beatrice, Mrs. Scroxton, President, Young Women's Christian Association.
- John Beesley Sharp, Assistant Secretary, Department of Health and Social Security.
- Thomas Sharp, Grade 5, Department of Trade and Industry.
- Hilary Bertha Shuard, Director, National Curriculum Development Project, Primary Initiatives in Mathematics Education.
- John Park Sorrie, Lately Convener, Grampian Regional Council.
- William Stapleton, O.B.E., Lately Director, National Association of Waste Disposal Contractors.
- Donald Edgar Stringer. For political service.
- Ian Galbraith Taylor, Professor of Audiology and Education of the Deaf, University of Manchester.
- Nigel Scott Thornton-Kemsley, D.L., Chairman, Board of Governors, North of Scotland College of Agriculture.
- Louis van Praag, Chairman, Sabre International Textiles Ltd.
- John Wedgwood, For services to the Royal Hospital and Home for Incurables.
- John Whaley, Assistant Secretary, Department of Energy.
- Godfrey Oliver Whitehead, Lately Chairman, Laing Mowlem ARC Joint Venture.
- William Lionel Wilkinson, Director, Spent Fuel Management Services, British Nuclear Fuels plc.
- Colonel Francis John Kevin Williams, T.D., Chairman, North West of England and Isle of Man Territorial Auxiliary and Volunteer Reserve Association.
- Francis Owen Garbett Williams, Managing Director, Williams Grand Prix Engineering Ltd.
- Raymond Lloyd Williams, Director, Forensic Science Laboratory, Metropolitan Police.
- Colin Wills, Principal Inspector, Board of Inland Revenue.
- Henry Charles Woolley, Consultant, British Insulated Callender's Cables plc.
- Alan James Young. For political and public service.
- Professor Alexander John Youngson, Chairman, Royal Fine Art Commission for Scotland.

Diplomatic Service and Overseas List

- Ernest George Baber, lately Justice of the High Court, Hong Kong.
- Robin Hutcheon, For services to journalism in Hong Kong.
- Alec Anthony Kinch, lately Head of Regional Policy Division, Commission of the E.C., Brussels.
- Peter Brian Naylor, lately British Council Representative, Greece.
- Colin Hugh Seaward, lately H.M. Consul-General, Rio de Janeiro.

==== Officers (OBE) ====
Military Division

Royal Navy

- Commander John Richard Furse, Royal Navy.
- Commander Alexander Michael Gregory, Royal Navy.
- Lieutenant Colonel Jonathan Roy Hensman, Royal Marines.
- Commander Brian Jones, Royal Navy.
- Commander Jonathan Hugh Armstrong Mason, Royal Navy.
- Commander Michael Hugh Piper, Royal Navy.
- Lieutenant Colonel Rupert Cornells Van der Horst, Royal Marines.
- Commander Jack Peter William Ward, Royal Navy.
- Commander Christopher Budd Webb, Royal Navy.
- Commander Alan Howard Roderick York, Royal Navy.

Army

- Lieutenant Colonel Anthony Lloyd Bridger (445801), Royal Corps of Transport.
- Acting Lieutenant Colonel Gerard Albert Canipel (468402), Army Cadet Force.
- Lieutenant Colonel William John Dawson (474414), 7th Duke of Edinburgh's Own Gurkha Rifles.
- Lieutenant Colonel Adrian Douglas Frais T.D. (479640), The Yorkshire Volunteers, Territorial Army.
- Lieutenant Colonel Geoffrey Ernest Godbold T.D. (494921), The Honourable Artillery Company, Territorial Army.
- Lieutenant Colonel Patrick Roy Holcroft (486664), Grenadier Guards.
- Lieutenant Colonel Alan George Rupert Holman (489908), Corps of Royal Engineers.
- Lieutenant Colonel Philip Henry Kay (479271), Corps of Royal Electrical and Mechanical Engineers.
- Lieutenant Colonel (now Acting Colonel) Joseph Nigel Haynes Lacey (473993), Corps of Royal Engineers.
- Acting Lieutenant Colonel John Reginald Kenneth Mann (412855), Combined Cadet Force.
- Lieutenant Colonel George Ashley Morris (474015), Royal Regiment of Artillery.
- Lieutenant Colonel Ian Neil Osborne M.B.E. (479314), Royal Corps of Transport.
- Lieutenant Colonel Andrew Peter Harold Parsons (463071), Scots Guards.
- Lieutenant Colonel Timothy Laurence Murray Porter M.B.E. (471653), The Royal Welch Fusiliers.
- Lieutenant Colonel (now Colonel) Nigel William Fairbairn Richards (480385), Royal Regiment of Artillery.
- Lieutenant Colonel Julien Robert Turner (475252), The Royal Hussars (Prince of Wales's Own).
- Lieutenant Colonel John Gage Williams (481901), Light Infantry.

Royal Air Force

- Wing Commander Ian Brackenbury (609394), Royal Air Force.
- Wing Commander Malcolm George Cooper (685812) Royal Air Force.
- Wing Commander Joseph Charles French (4233570), Royal Air Force.
- Wing Commander Martyn John Gardiner (507887), Royal Air Force.
- Wing Commander Ian Shearer Headley (4083517), Royal Air Force.
- Wing Commander David Holcroft (589047), Royal Air Force.
- Wing Commander Harry Raymond Kidd (3133362), Royal Air Force Volunteer Reserve (Training).
- Wing Commander Victor Desmond King (505071), Royal Air Force.
- Wing Commander Clive Naylor (2528678), Royal Air Force.
- Wing Commander David Miller Niven M.B.E. (2614751), Royal Air Force.
- Wing Commander Douglas Stewart Shaw (684083), Royal Air Force.

Civil Division

- Gordon Adam, Senior Executive, Export Group, Marks and Spencer pic. For services to Export.
- Professor Stewart Sanders Adams, Research and Development Co-ordinator, The Boots Company plc.
- Patricia Audrey, Mrs. Ade, Area Secretary and Member of Council, North Wales, Soldiers' Sailors' and Airmen's Families Association.
- Abdul Karim, Admani, Consultant Physician, Trent Regional Health Authority.
- Alan Michael Adye, Director, Marine Technology Directorate, Science Engineering Research Council.
- Robert Harold Allardice, Director, Process Technology and Safety, Risley, United Kingdom Atomic Energy Authority.
- Peter John Samuel Allington, Director Operations, Electronics Systems and Equipment Division, Bracknell, British Aerospace plc.
- James Antill, chairman, Walsall and Wolverhampton Area Manpower Board, Manpower Services Commission.
- Andrew Alston Arbuckle. For services to Agriculture in Scotland.
- Ronald James Ellis Arthur, Deputy Chief Constable, Tayside Police.
- Cecil Attwood, chairman, Shildon and Sedgefield Development Agency.
- Brian Godwin Atwood, General Secretary, Association for Science Education.
- Donald Clive Austin, Marine Business Manager, Rolls-Royce plc.
- Stephen Baker, Lately Managing Director, British Electricity International Ltd.
- James William Gordon Barr, Member, Scottish Valuation Advisory Council.
- Harding Bevan Bassett, Director, International Consultancy Service, British Gas plc.
- John Baxter, Member, Alnwick District Council.
- Bryan William Beckett, County Trading Standards Officer, Avon County Council.
- Robert David, Bell, Lately Head, Overseas Division, National Institute of Agricultural Engineering.
- Dennis Malcolm Bevan, Headmaster, Rose Hill Special School, Worcester.
- William Osborne Binns, Principal Scientific Officer Forestry Commission.
- Miss Hilary Birkin, Headteacher, Belstead Special School, Ipswich.
- William Anthony Hollingsworth Blair, Headmaster, Croxteth School, Liverpool.
- Robert James Clifford Boyd, Chief Commissioner, Northern Ireland Scout Association.
- David Charles Arthur Bradshaw, Principal, Doncaster Metropolitan Institute of Higher Education.
- Lieutenant Colonel Ian Henderson Branton (Retd), Director, British Trust for Conservation Volunteers.
- Frank George Brotherston, Senior Assistant Editor, Department of the Official Report, House of Commons.
- Alexander Forbes Brown, Manager, Belfast Marks and Spencer plc.
- James Baxter Chalmers Brown, Assistant Chief Commissioner for Scotland, Scout Association.
- John Graham Brown, Co-leader, Royal Opera House Orchestra.
- Malcolm Alan Brown. For political service.
- Alistair Rutherford Brownlie. For services to the Legal profession in Scotland.
- Miss Anne Buchanan-Riddell, Lately Registrar, University of York.
- Alan Bullen, executive director, Orkney Islands Shipping Company Ltd.
- John Halcrow Burrow, Deputy Chief Constable, Merseyside Police.
- Peter Craig Byrom. For services to the Royal College of Art.
- John Terence Carter, managing director, Darlington and Simpson Rolling Mills plc.
- Nancy Mona, Mrs. Catchpole. For services to Women's Committee for Industry Year.
- Phillip Charlton, Chief General Manager, Group Central Executive, Trustee Savings Bank.
- Gordon Albert Cheater, Director, Outer Area, Commonwealth War Graves Commission.
- Donald Cheetham, Director of Social Services, Liverpool Metropolitan Borough Council.
- Henry Simpson Crosbie Cochrane, Lately Inspector Grade I, Department of Agriculture, Northern Ireland.
- (James) Graham Collier, Jazz Musician and Composer.
- Michael Eugene Connolly, Member, Police Authority for Northern Ireland.
- Peter Denis Connolly. For services to the Fire Authority for Northern Ireland.
- John Peter Coverdale, deputy chairman, Yorkshire Water Authority.
- Jean Welch, Mrs. Craven, chairman, South Cumbria Health Authority.
- John Raymond Crook, Lately Director, Ross Foods Ltd.
- James Crutchley, M.B.E., Q.P.M., Assistant Chief Constable, Royal Ulster Constabulary.
- Terence Tenison Cuneo, Artist.
- Lily, Mrs. Davenport. For political and public service.
- Clifford John Jeffreys Davies, Lately Area Director, South Wales, British Coal.
- Watkin Dennis Davies, Director, Mid Glamorgan Social Services Department.
- Ruth, Mrs. Dean. For political and public service.
- Derek Doyle, medical director, St. Columba's Hospice, Edinburgh.
- Angus Duncan Deputy Chief Quantity Surveyor, Scottish Development Department.
- Malcolm McGregor Duncan, Chief Executive, City of Edinburgh District Council.
- Frances Margaret, Mrs. du Toit, Chief Nursing Officer/Unit General Manager (Priority Care Services), Worthing District Health Authority.
- Miss Diana Elizabeth Edwards-Jones, Head of Programme Directors, Independent Television News.
- Thomas Frederick Elton, Q.F.S.M., Chief Officer, Tyne and Wear Fire Brigade.
- Harold Alexander Ennis, chairman and managing director, Boxmore International Ltd.
- Hywel Iorwerth Evans, Headmaster, Aberconwy Comprehensive School, Gwynedd.
- Philip Fairclough, managing director and Chief Executive, Castrol Ltd.
- Derek Charles Falvey, Regional Administrative Officer. Department of the Environment.
- John Edwin Field, Member, Defence Scientific Advisory Council.
- Stanley William Martin Fitch, Foreign and Commonwealth Office.
- Terence Patrick Flanagan, managing director, Sira Ltd.
- Peggy Evelyn, Mrs. Flew. For services to the community in Maidenhead, Berkshire.
- Eric Dudley Fountain, Director, Public Affairs, Vauxhall Motors Ltd.
- Robert Anthony Fryars, Lately Adviser to Vehicles & Systems Assessment Department, Transport and Road Research Laboratory.
- John Gale, Director, Chichester Festival Theatre.
- Alfred Geiringer, chairman and managing director, Universal News Services Ltd.
- Miss Mary Sheila Goldring. For services to Economic Journalism and Broadcasting.
- Michael Spencer Goodfellow, Flight Operations Executive, Civil Aircraft Division, Hatfield, British Aerospace plc.
- Harold Gott, Branch President, Gwynedd, British Red Cross Society.
- George Malcolm Roger Graham, Group Managing Director, BIS Group of Companies Ltd.
- Constance Vera, Mrs. Green. For charitable services.
- Richard Arthur Guntrip, Principal Scientific Officer, Ministry of Defence.
- Frederick Alexander Hanna. For charitable services, particularly to the Gloucestershire Cobalt Unit, Cheltenham General Hospital.
- Edna Elizabeth, Mrs. Harding. For political and public service.
- Sydney Charles Harding. For political and public service.
- Robert Michael Harley, President, Royal Forestry Society.
- Alfred Joseph Harms. For political and public service.
- Melville Isaac Harris, Principal, Gwent College of Higher Education.
- Miss Mary Margaret Maryllia Harrison, Education Officer, Sandwell Local Education Authority.
- Derek William Hart, Chief Resident Engineer, W. S. Atkins and Partners.
- Miss Joan Hassall. Designer, Wood-engraver, Illustrator.
- Brian Hayward, Member, Yorkshire Regional Health Authority.
- Aidan Healey, Deputy Chief Physical Education Officer, H.M. Prison Service.
- Sheila Margaret, Mrs. Henry, chairman, Southern Derbyshire Community Health Council.
- Peter Matthew Higgins, Professor of General Practice, Guy's Hospital Medical School, University of London.
- Miss Mary Robinson Hope, Regional Manager (West), Scottish Special Housing Association.
- Leslie Kennedy Howarth, managing director, Campbeltown Shipyard Ltd.
- John Ashton Huckvale, Inspector, Board of Inland Revenue.
- John Leslie Hunt, Senior Medical Officer, Department of Health and Social Security.
- Willis Ibbotson, Lately Transport and Safety Co-ordinator, Albright and Wilson Ltd.
- Professor Daphne Frances Jackson. For services to the Women's Engineering Society.
- Miss Grace Jackson, Lately Director, London Boroughs' Training Committee (Social Services).
- Patrick Anthony Jennings, M.B.E. For services to Association Football, particularly Northern Ireland.
- Kenneth John, Principal, Ministry of Defence.
- Herbert Fletcher Jones, Assistant Education Officer (Youth), Wirral Local Education Authority.
- John Jones, Leader, Vale of White Horse District Council.
- Robert Jones, M.B.E., Secretary, Ulster Savings Committee.
- William Kenyon, Counselling Adviser, Reading, Small Firms Service.
- Susan Elizabeth, Mrs. Kilpatrick, Secretary, Milk Marketing Board, England and Wales.
- Michael Kinchin Smith, Appointments Secretary to the Archbishop of Canterbury.
- James Frederick Lowry King, Director, Caldecott Community, Mersham-le-Hatch, Kent.
- Norman Frederic Wallace King, managing director, R.S. Components Ltd. For services to Export.
- Alexander Wilson Kinnaird, Member, Milk Marketing Board, Northern Ireland.
- Vivian Albert Knight, Director of Highways and Transportation, Cheshire County Council.
- George Sarkis Kurkjian, For services to the development of the Oils, Seeds and Fats trade.
- William Arthur Lewis. For services to Mining in Developing Countries.
- John Kevin Lyden, administrative director, Shotton Paper Mills.
- John James MacAleenan, Principal Professional and Technology Officer, Department of the Environment, Northern Ireland.
- John Saffery Mackenzie, chairman, Visitors Division, 1986 Commonwealth Games.
- Eric Dermot Mackie, managing director, Govan Shipbuilders Ltd.
- John Mair. For political and public service.
- Joan Gordon, Mrs. Marsh. For services to the Magistrates' Association.
- John Raymond Massey, Group Chairman and Chief Executive, Sigmex International plc.
- Thomas Laurence McGann, Principal Professional and Technology Officer, Ministry of Defence.
- Rankine McKenzie McLeod, Lately Chairman, General Dental Service Committee, Northern Ireland.
- Thomas Meffen, Assistant Chief Constable, West Midlands Police.
- James Fraser Millar, Convener, Clackmannan District Council.
- Frank Charles Mills, Lately Headmaster, Marshalswick School, St Albans.
- Gerald Martin William Milsom, Vice President, East Anglia Tourist Board.
- Peter John Mitchell. For political and public service.
- Alexander Dewar Montgomery, Group Export Director, Stoddard Holdings plc. For services to Export.
- Brian Peter Moss, Chief Executive, Nu-Aire Ltd.
- Miss Patricia Mary Mullin, Lately Headteacher, St Gregory's Roman Catholic Comprehensive School, Kirkby.
- Michael Hector Francis Murphy, Chief Officer, Western Education and Library Board, Northern Ireland.
- Albert Charles William Neely. For services to the Road Haulage industry.
- Allan Onions, County Surveyor, Staffordshire County Council.
- Miss (Helen) Romaine Palmer. For political and public service.
- Richard William Palmer. For services to Sport.
- Neville Parker, chairman, British Rolling Mills Ltd and deputy chairman, British Bright Bar Ltd.
- Victor Jeffares Parker, Administrator, Tudor Charitable Trust.
- Arthur Parkes, Headmaster, Redruth Grammar School.
- Lieutenant Commander Harold Noel Paulley, R.N. (Retd.). For political and public service.
- Basil Bertram Phillips, Lately Secretary, City and Guilds of London Institute.
- James Leslie Pickard, Assistant Marketing Director, Central Marketing, Marconi Radar Systems Ltd. For services to Export.
- Horace William Poole, Lately Chairman, British Paraplegic Sports Society Ltd.
- David Brian Price, Lately Chief Commissioner, Wales, St John Ambulance Brigade.
- Robert William Ramsdale, Lately Chairman, Maynards pic. For services to the confectionery industry.
- Kenneth George Owen Read, Grade 6, Ministry of Defence.
- Lyn Thomas Rees, Consultant Anaesthetist, South Glamorgan Health Authority.
- Nigel Barrie Reginald Reeves, Lately Professor of German & Head of Department of Linguistics & International Studies, University of Surrey.
- Margaret Joy, Mrs. Reid. For political and public service.
- Keith Renshaw, Lobby Correspondent, Sunday Express.
- Alfred Sinclair Road, Consultant, Committee for Middle East Trade, British Overseas Trade Board. For services to Export.
- Miss Agnes Mary Robertson, Lately Depute Headteacher, Anderson High School. Lerwick.
- Thomas Keith Robinson, Director, Glasgow Centre, Scottish Curriculum Development Service.
- John Ross, Inspector, Board of Inland Revenue.
- Alan Walter Rudge, managing director, ERA Technology Ltd.
- Kenneth Victor Runcie, Director of Extension Services, East of Scotland College of Agriculture.
- Jack Schofield, Headmaster, Spurley Hey High School, Manchester.
- Henry Stewart Scobie. For services to the Urban Development Grant Scheme, Wales.
- Jack Scott, Courts Administrator, Sheffield, Lord Chancellor's Department.
- John Beaumont Scott-Wilson, Divisional Technical Director, Civil Aircraft Division, Hatfield, British Aerospace plc.
- Jennifer Anne, Mrs. Scurfield, Lately Divisional Veterinary Officer, Ministry of Agriculture, Fisheries and Food.
- David Norman Sharpe, chairman, Pharmaceutical Services Negotiating Committee.
- Charles Reginald Shotbolt. For political and public service.
- Roy Peter Smith, Borough Librarian, London Borough of Sutton.
- Douglas Arthur Southwick. For political and public service.
- Derek Hammond Stroud, Singer.
- Dorothy, Mrs. Sutton. For political and public service.
- Colin Hugh Thomas, Chief Probation Officer, South Yorkshire Probation Service.
- John Henry Thornton, Q.P.M., Lately Deputy Assistant Commissioner, Metropolitan Police.
- Brigadier Mervyn Christopher Thursby-Pelham (Retd), Lately Director General, British Heart Foundation.
- Geoffrey Michael Graydon Tibbs, Lately Secretary, Royal College of Physicians.
- John Towey, Lately Chief Executive and Town Clerk, Rochdale Metropolitan Borough Council.
- Maurice Gilbert Walwyn Trumper. For services to Agriculture in Wales.
- Frederick John Underhill, General Secretary, British Greyhound Racing Board: Secretary, National Greyhound Racing Club.
- Major Robin Darell Unwin, T.D. For political and public service.
- Alan Joseph Viner, Lately Section Head, Ships Department, National Maritime Museum.
- Professor Andrew Finlay Walls. For services to the Arts, particularly Museums and Galleries, in Scotland.
- James Warden, Grade 7, Department of Trade and Industry.
- William Phillip Warren. For services to the development of industry in Wales.
- Margaret Heather, Mrs. Waterston. For political and public service.
- Roy Deans Weir, Vice-chairman, Grampian Health Board.
- William Henry Whitehouse, Director, Signal and Telecommunications Engineering, British Railways Board.
- James Phillip Wiltshire, chairman, Ayrshire, Dumfries and Galloway Area Manpower Board.
- John Jasper Woodcock, Director, Institute for the Study of Drug Dependence.
- William Woof. For services to housing management in the public sector.

==== Members (MBE) ====
Military Division

Civil Division

=== Colonial Police and Fire Service Medal (CPM) ===
- Richard Graham Bell, Superintendent, Royal Hong Kong Police Force.
- Derek Clive Butler, Senior Superintendent, Royal Hong Kong Police Force.
- Alexander Chalmers, Chief Inspector, Royal Hong Kong Police Force.
- Chan Cheung-kit, Station Officer, Hong Kong Fire Services.
- Chan Hoi, Senior Divisional Officer, Hong Kong Fire Services.
- Chan Shu-fai, Principal Fireman, Hong Kong Fire Services.
- Chang Spu-tien, Senior Inspector, Royal Hong Kong Police Force.
- Dunn Nai-bun, Superintendent, Royal Hong Kong Police Force.
- Bruce Ferguson, Senior Superintendent, Royal Hong Kong Police Force.
- Anthony John Ferrige, Senior Superintendent, Royal Hong Kong Police Force.
- John Frederick Godden, Senior Divisional Officer, Hong Kong Fire Services.
- Kwok Kam-pui, Sergeant, Royal Hong Kong Police Force.
- Lee Hing-man, Station Sergeant, Royal Hong Kong Police Force.
- Lee Man-tong, Station Sergeant, Royal Hong Kong Police Force.
- Lung Kin-kei, Senior Inspector, Royal Hong Kong Police Force.
- John Turnbull Mcgill, Chief Superintendent, Cayman Islands Police Force.
- Man Wai-yu, Station Sergeant, Royal Hong Kong Police Force.
- Ng Ching-kwok, Chief Superintendent, Royal Hong Kong Police Force.
- Tsang Kwong-yu, Senior Divisional Officer, Hong Kong Fire Services.
- Tsang Yam-pui, Chief Superintendent, Royal Hong Kong Police Force.
- Wu Shiu-cheuk, Senior Superintendent, Royal Hong Kong Police Force.

== Australia ==
=== Knight Bachelor ===
- The Honourable Mr. Justice Dormer George Andrews, Chief Justice of Queensland.
- Leo Arthur Hielscher, Under Treasurer of Queensland.

=== Order of St Michael and St George ===
==== Companion (CMG) ====
- Dr. Russell Walker Strong. For service to the medical profession.

=== Order of the British Empire ===
==== Commander (CBE) ====
- Dr. Michael James Conomos. For service to the community.
- David Vincent Gunn. For public and community service.

==== Officers (OBE) ====
- Robert Keith Boughen. For service to music.
- James Christian Carey. For service to the legal profession and the community.
- Dr. Kevin Patrick Kennedy. For service to medicine.
- Ronald Ewan McMaster. For service to the building industry.
- Olga Phyllis, Mrs. Mor. For service to the sport of lawn bowls.
- Maxwell Thomas Bushby, lately Speaker of the House of Assembly.

==== Members (MBE) ====
- Alan Norman Bray. For service to the community.
- Joan, Mrs. Willoughby Joyce. For service to the community.
- Sydney Lingard. For service to the sport of lawn bowls.
- Dr. Victor Roy Luck. For service to the community.
- Margaret Ellen, Mrs. Pidgeon. For service to the building industry.
- Norman Vincent Rice. For service to bee-keeping industry.
- Sister Mary Dorothea Sheehan, R.S.M. For services to nursing.
- William James Gunn. For service to agriculture and the community.
- Trevor George Hodge. For service to disabled children.

=== Imperial Service Order ===
- Donald George Young. For public service.
- Lloyd A. Koerbin. For service to industry.

=== British Empire Medal ===
- Marjorie Dora, Mrs. Anderson. For service to the community.
- Betty Alma, Mrs. Bennett. For service to the community.
- Dr. Ailcie Meredith Foxton. For service to the community.
- Miss Jane Hickling. For service to the community.
- Winifred Isobel, Mrs. Lloyd. For service to the community in particular the blind.
- Thomas Walker McLucas. For service to the community.
- Donald Malcolm McPherson. For service to the community.
- Dorothy, Mrs. Nicholson. For service to the community.
- Michael Bernard Ryalls. For service to the community.
- Joyce Helena Averina, Mrs. Savage. For service to the community.
- George Shaw. For service to the community.
- Ernest Leonard Young. For service to the community.
- Terence Ralph Avery. For service to the community.
- Robert Hilton Barratt. For services to agriculture and the community.
- Ellen Minnie (Nell), Mrs. Pascoe. For social welfare work.

=== Queen's Police Medal ===
- John Malachi Donoghue, Assistant Commissioner, Queensland Police Force.
- Harold Leslie Southern, Inspector, Tasmania Police Force.

=== Queen's Fire Service Medal ===
- James Moore, Chief Fire Safety Officer, State Fire Service.

== Barbados ==
=== Order of St Michael and St George ===
==== Knight Commander (KCMG) ====
- The Honourable James Cameron Tudor, C.M.G., Minister of Foreign Affairs and Leader of the Senate.

== Mauritius ==
=== Knight Bachelor ===
- Piat Joseph Raymond Andre Raffray, Q.C For public service and service to the legal profession.

=== Order of St Michael and St George ===
==== Companion (CMG) ====
- Paul Volcy Yvan Lagesse. For service to banking.

=== Order of the British Empire ===
==== Commanders (CBE) ====
- Angidi Veeriah Chettiar. For political and public service.
- Alex Voon Chong Fon Sing. For services to trade and industry.
- Deokeenanun Ramdharry. For voluntary social work and services to industry.

==== Officers (OBE) ====
- Marie Yves Betuel. For the promotion of shipping.
- Gajudhur Jingree. For voluntary social work.
- Rajkarrun Thumba Naik. For service in the field of family planning.

==== Members (MBE) ====
- Ponsamy Ganeshan. For services to primary education.
- Marie Leandre Sybille, Mrs. Gelle. For services to nursing.
- Puresram Hookoom. For voluntary social work.
- Premdee Luximow. For voluntary social work.
- Baldeo Mutty. For voluntary social work.
- Rajman Ramchurn. For voluntary social work.
- Chendramanee Ramduny. For voluntary social work.
- Seetharamdoo Sunassee. For voluntary social work.
- Ragoonath Bhugaloo Tacoordyal. For voluntary social work.

=== Imperial Service Order ===
- Aboo Bakar Khadaroo. For public service.

=== Mauritius Police Medal ===
- Louis France Roland Assarapin, lately Chief Inspector of Police, Mauritius Police Force.
- Roger Lacharmante, lately Police Sergeant, Mauritius Police Force.
- Roger Freddy Rangapanaiken, lately Police Constable, Mauritius Police Force.

== Fiji ==
=== Order of St Michael and St George ===
==== Companion (CMG) ====
- Charles Walker, Minister for Primary Industries.

=== Order of the British Empire ===
==== Commander (CBE) ====
- Joyce, Mrs. Perks. For public service.

==== Officer (OBE) ====
- Patrick Joyce Doyle. For services to tourism.
- Ratu Seci Nawalowalo. For public service.
- Sher Mohammed Khan Sherani. For services to the Moslem community.

==== Member (MBE) ====
- Mohammed Razak Akbar. For services to scouting and the community.
- Sam Lal Bigan. For services to agriculture and the community.
- Ratu Ifereimi Buaserau. For services to medical care and the community.
- Kesaia Tawa, Mrs. Bouwalu. For services to sport and the community.
- Raghunath Singh. For services to public transport and the community.

=== British Empire Medal ===
- Mohammed Sakur Ali For service to the community.
- Thomas Lee Joe. For public service.
- Dost Mohammed Mehrab Khan. For public service.
- Melaia, Mrs Mucunabitu. For public service.
- Kuttan Param Nair. For services to agriculture and the community.

== Grenada ==
=== Order of the British Empire ===
==== Officers (OBE) ====
- Carlyle Alfred John. For services to education.
- John Ernest Butler. For public service.

==== Members (MBE) ====
- Denis Elisha Hypolite. For services to education.
- Lloyd Augustine Robert. For services to education.
- Joseph Emmanuel Daniel. For service to the community.

=== British Empire Medal ===
- Anthony Augustine Lewis. For services as a shipwright and seafarer.
- Durrant Beethoven Joseph. For services as a shipwright and fisherman.

== Papua New Guinea ==
=== Knight Bachelor ===
- Dr. Alexis Holyweek Sarei, C.B.E. For services to diplomacy and public and community affairs.

=== Order of St Michael and St George ===
==== Companion (CMG) ====
- Honourable Glaime Warena, M.P. For public and community service.

=== Order of the British Empire ===
==== Dame Commander (DBE) ====
- Mary Mrs. Kekedo, C.B.E., B.E.M. For services to community and women's affairs.

==== Commander (CBE) ====
- Brown Bai. For public service.

==== Officer (OBE) ====
- Ivan Raymond (Ray) Anderson. For services to sport and education.
- Dou Babaga. For service to the community especially savings and loans societies.
- Lohia Doriga. For services to community and public.
- Dr. Gilbert James McArthur, LL.D., M.A. For community service and emergency relief work.
- Samson Pataliu, M.B.E. For public service.
- Tepu Poga. For public and community service.
- Paul William Quodling. For service to commerce and community affairs.
- Luke Clement Sela. For services to journalism.
- Mrs. (Sister) Miriam Soroda. For service to nursing and the community.

==== Member (MBE) ====
Civil Division

- Donald Harrison Briggs. For service to commerce.
- David Bryan. For service as a volunteer search and rescue co-ordinator.
- Chief Inspector The Reverend Hehani Daroa. For service to the constabulary arid community.
- Waramp Mrs. Diria, For services to women's affairs and politics.
- Honourable Samson Gil A, M.P.A. For community service.
- Sergeant Major Philip Kero (3939), Royal Papua New Guinea Constabulary.
- William Painap Lalu, M.P.A. For public and community service.
- Benjamin Moide. For community service.
- Ms. (Sister) Helen Roberts. For service to nursing and community.
- Epi Wari, M.P.A. For public service.

Military Division

- Lieutenant Robert Nana (86161), Papua New Guinea Defence Force.

=== Imperial Service Order ===
- Dr. Robert Quentin Reilly, M.B. For public service.

=== British Empire Medal ===
- Filipus Angmai. For community service.
- Kewa Bi. For public service.
- Miss Marion Dredge. For service to Scouting.
- Daera Ganiga. For community service.
- Chief Assistant Correctional Officer Gaviro Javuso (1115), Papua New Guinea Prison Service.
- Sinemauwe Kawale. For service to public and community.
- Senior Sergeant Kila Kepi (4411), Royal Papua New Guinea Constabulary and the Police Band.
- Ealu Lelegi. For service as a Public Service Driver.
- Raho Gari Misi. For service to Scouting.
- Nou Tau. For service as a Public Service Driver.
- First Constable Vali Tau (2009), Royal Papua New Guinea Constabulary and the Police Band.
- Naipu Ibilyo Toraso. For public service.
- Paul Toua. For community service.

Military Division

- Warrant Officer (Staff Sergeant) Emanuel Rogers Bogea (86029), Papua New Guinea Defence
- Lance Corporal Jabio Damby (86039), Papua New Guinea Defence Force.
- Corporal Susum Kabu (82759), Papua New Guinea Defence Force.
- Sergeant Yamele Sanga (86198), Papua New Guinea Defence Force.

=== Queen's Police Medal ===
George Obel Buka, Chief Inspector, Papua New Guinea Police Force. Robert Korus, Chief Superintendent, Papua New Guinea Police Force.

== Tuvalu ==
=== Order of the British Empire ===
==== Member (MBE) ====
- Dr. Teleke Kofe, Government Medical Officer.

== St Lucia ==
=== Order of the British Empire ===
==== Officer (OBE) ====
- Dr. Joseph Edsel Edmunds, St. Lucia Ambassador to U.S.A.

==== Member (MBE) ====
- Michael Patterson Toussaint. For services to education and the community.
- Margaret Theresa Sonia George. For services to education and the Girl Guides.

=== British Empire Medal ===
- Marie Daniel. For services to the community and the Red Cross.
- Lucas Felix. For services to education and the community.

== St Vincent and The Grenadines ==
=== Order of the British Empire ===
==== Member (MBE) ====
- O'Neale Sinclair Barrow, lately Permanent Secretary, Ministry of External Affairs.
- Lemuel Errol Findlay. For services to community relations in London.

== Belize ==
=== Order of the British Empire ===
==== Officer (OBE) ====
- Santoz Diaz Sr. For services to the community.

==== Member (MBE) ====
- Miss Mary Bahadur. For services to midwifery.
- Ernestine Veronica, Mrs. Charley. For services to education and the community.

== Antigua and Barbuda ==
=== Order of the British Empire ===
==== Commander (OBE) ====
- Cuthwin Lennard Lake, Surgeon Specialist and Medical Adviser to the Government of Antigua and Barbuda.

==== Member (MBE) ====
- Alfred Rutland Augustine Lewis. For services to music and the community.

== St Christopher and Nevis ==
=== Order of the British Empire ===
==== Member (MBE) ====
- Eileen Muriel, Mrs. Blackett. For services to the community.

=== British Empire Medal ===
- James Onesimus Brookes. For services to the community.
- George Samuel Hunkins. For services to the community.
- Elizabeth, Mrs. Pemberton. For services to the community.
