= Rellie =

Rellie may refer to:

- Alastair Rellie (1935–2018), British intelligence officer
- Rellie Kaputin (born 1993), Papua New Guinean athlete
