= Patrick Holcroft =

English retired soldier and banker

Lieutenant Colonel Patrick Roy Holcroft CVO OBE (born 17 March 1948) is a former British Army officer and banker who served as Lord-Lieutenant of Worcestershire, the British monarch's personal representative in the county, from 2012 to 2023.

== Biography ==
Educated at Downside School, the University of Nottingham (BA, 1972), and at the Royal Military Academy Sandhurst, Holcroft served 19 years in the Grenadier Guards, rising to the rank of lieutenant colonel, before pursuing a career in the City of London with the UK merchant banking group Robert Fleming & Co. in 1988.

Holcroft remained with the bank as CEO of its Lloyd's re-insurance broking business and a director of the investment management business until the bank was acquired in 2000 by Chase Manhattan Bank. Following a buyout, he became CEO of the renamed RFIB group. He remained CEO of the group until 2009, becoming a non-executive director until 2012. He was also a non-executive director of the Griffin Insurance Association until 2012 and a non-executive director of Thomas Miller Holdings until 2016.

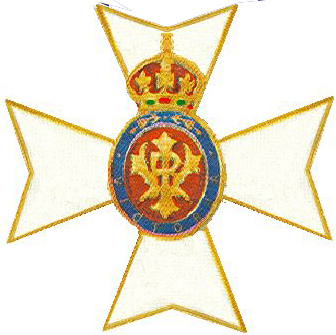
CVO insignia

Holcroft was born and brought up in Worcestershire, became a Deputy Lieutenant of Worcestershire in 2009 and was promoted Lord-Lieutenant on 28 December 2012. He was appointed Officer of the Order of the British Empire (OBE) in the 1987 New Year Honours, Lieutenant of the Royal Victorian Order (LVO) in the 2013 New Year Honours, Commander of the Order of St John (CStJ) in 2018 and promoted Commander of the Royal Victorian Order (CVO) in the 2022 Birthday Honours.

He is a Trustee or Adviser to the Grenadier Guards, Nuffield Trust for the Forces of the Crown; the Royal Military Academy Sandhurst; the Hedley Foundation, which supports young people, the disabled and the terminally ill; and until 2014 the Lloyd's Patriotic Fund. He is also President or Patron of a number of Worcestershire-based charities, including New College Worcester, Worcestershire Ambassadors, the Worcestershire Community Foundation, Worcestershire and Dudley Historic Churches; and he is a member of the Council of Worcestershire Cathedral.

== Personal life ==
Holcroft lives near Tenbury Wells and has been married to former Vanity Fair publisher Annie Roberts Holcroft since 1982. They had three boys: former soldier Oliver James (born 1985), actor Edward Patrick (born 1987) and Thomas William (born 1992).
