= Graham Hart (civil servant) =

British civil servant

Sir Graham Hart KCB
- Born: Graham Allan Hart; 13 March 1940 (age 85); Romford, Essex, England
- Education: Brentwood School
- Alma mater: Pembroke College, Oxford
- Occupation: civil servant
- Spouse: Margaret Aline Powell (m. 1962)
- Children: 2

Sir Graham Allan Hart KCB (born 13 March 1940) is a British retired civil servant.

Hart was born in Romford, the son of Frederick Hart and Winifred Schofield. He was educated at Brentwood School and Pembroke College, Oxford.

Hart made his career, first in the Department of Health and Social Security, and, after 1988, in the separate Department of Health, rising to be permanent secretary there from 1992 to 1997.

Upon retirement he served as chair of the King's Fund and of Citizens Advice, and sat on the advisory committee of the Centre for History in Public Health. He also undertook a PhD in early modern history.

He was made a Companion of the Order of the Bath (CB) in the 1987 New Year Honours and a Knight Commander of the Order of the Bath (KCB) in the 1996 Birthday Honours.

Government offices
Preceded by Christopher France	Permanent Secretary at the Department of Health; 1992–1997	Succeeded by Chris Kelly
