= Edward Holcroft =

English actor

- Born: Edward Patrick Holcroft; 23 June 1987 (age 39); London, England
- Other name: Ed Holcroft
- Education: Oxford Brookes University; Drama Centre London
- Occupation: Actor
- Years active: 2011–present
- Notable work: Kingsman: The Secret Service; Kingsman: The Golden Circle; Wolf Hall; London Spy; Alias Grace

Edward Patrick Holcroft (born 23 June 1987) is an English film, television, and stage actor. He is best known for his roles in the Kingsman film franchise and in the television series Wolf Hall (2015), London Spy (2015), Alias Grace (2017), and The English Game (2020).

== Early life and education ==
Holcroft is the second of three sons born to Lt. Col. Patrick Holcroft, a soldier, and Kathleen "Annie" Holcroft (née Roberts), a former publisher at Condé Nast. His elder brother, Oliver, is a former soldier who served with the Grenadier Guards in Afghanistan.

Holcroft was sent to boarding school at age eight, first attending prep school at Summer Fields School in Oxford, and then a Catholic school, Ampleforth College, in North Yorkshire.

He initially wanted to become a professional drummer, having attended music school, but switched to acting after appearing in a play at Oxford Brookes University. He then undertook post-graduate studies in acting at the Drama Centre London of Central Saint Martins, University of the Arts London, graduating in 2012.

== Career ==
Holcroft is best known for his roles as Charlie Hesketh in the 2015 film Kingsman: The Secret Service and its 2017 sequel Kingsman: The Golden Circle; as George Boleyn in the 2015 British drama series Wolf Hall; and as Alex Turner in the 2015 BBC drama series London Spy.

In 2015, Holcroft acted with Dominic West and Janet McTeer in Les Liaisons Dangereuses at the Donmar Warehouse.

In 2017, he appeared in the historical miniseries Gunpowder on the BBC and Alias Grace on Netflix and the CBC.

In 2020, he was one of the lead actors in The English Game, playing Arthur Kinnaird.

== Filmography ==
=== Film ===
Year	Title	Role	Notes
2014	Vampire Academy	Aaron Drozdov	
2015	Kingsman: The Secret Service	Charles "Charlie" Hesketh	
2015	Lady Chatterley's Lover	Duncan Forbes	
2017	The Sense of an Ending	Jack Ford	
2017	Kingsman: The Golden Circle	Charles "Charlie" Hesketh	
2020	Kindred	Ben	
2022	Hill of Vision	Edward Ramberg	Italian/English

=== Television ===
Year	Title	Role	Notes
2015	Wolf Hall	George Boleyn	Miniseries; 5 episodes
2015	London Spy	Alistair "Alex" Turner	Miniseries; 5 episodes
2017	Alias Grace	Dr. Simon Jordan	Miniseries; 6 episodes
2017	Gunpowder	Thomas Wintour	Miniseries; 3 episodes
2020	The English Game	Arthur Kinnaird	Miniseries; main role
2022	The Undeclared War	James Cox	6 episodes
2024	The Agency	Dr. Charlie Remy	5 episodes
2025	A Wolf's Prey	Steve Wilkins	6 episodes; Lithuanian
2026	Industry	Sebastian Stefanowicz	Series 4; Ep. 1, 7, 8

=== Theatre ===
Year	Title	Role	Director	Company/Venue	Notes
2015–2016	Les Liaisons Dangereuses	Le Chevalier Danceny	Josie Rourke	Donmar Warehouse	
