= London Spy =

British-American television series

- Genre: Drama
- Created by: Tom Rob Smith
- Written by: Tom Rob Smith
- Directed by: Jakob Verbruggen
- Starring: Ben Whishaw; Jim Broadbent; Edward Holcroft; Samantha Spiro; Charlotte Rampling; Mark Gatiss; Harriet Walter
- Composers: David Holmes; Keefus Ciancia
- Countries of origin: United Kingdom; United States
- Original language: English
- No. of series: 1
- No. of episodes: 5

Production
- Producer: Guy Heeley
- Running time: 58–60 minutes
- Production companies: Working Title Television; BBC America; NBC Universal; BBC

Original release
- Network: BBC Two; BBC Two HD
- Release: 9 November – 7 December 2015

London Spy is a British-American five-part drama television serial created and written by Tom Rob Smith that aired on BBC Two from 9 November until 7 December 2015. It was aired on Netflix in 2018.

== Cast ==
=== Main ===
- Ben Whishaw as Daniel "Danny" Edward Holt
- Jim Broadbent as Scottie
- Edward Holcroft as Alistair "Alex" Turner
- Samantha Spiro as Detective Taylor
- Lorraine Ashbourne as Mrs. Turner / Nanny
- David Hayman as Mr. Turner / Groundsman
- Clarke Peters as the American
- Charlotte Rampling as Frances Turner
- Mark Gatiss as Rich
- Harriet Walter as Claire
- James Fox as James
- Adrian Lester as Professor Marcus Shaw
- Riccardo Scamarcio as Doppelganger

=== Recurring ===
- Josef Altin as Pavel
- Zrinka Cvitešić as Sara
- Nicolas Chagrin as Charles Turner
- Richard Cunningham as Danny's Lawyer
- Michaela Coel as Journalist

== Production ==
The series was commissioned by Janice Hadlow and Polly Hill, and produced by Guy Heeley for Working Title Television. The executive producers were Juliette Howell, Tim Bevan, Eric Fellner, and Polly Hill. Filming began in 2014 in London, West London Film Studios, Kent, on the Isle of Grain and at Dartford.

The story was inspired by the death of Gareth Williams, an MI6 agent found dead under similar, mysterious circumstances.

== Release ==
The first episode premiered in the U.K. on BBC Two at 9pm on Monday 9 November 2015, and the serial concluded 7 December 2015. In the U.S., it premiered on BBC America starting 21 January 2016. In 2018 it was carried on Netflix.

== Episodes ==
No.	Title	Directed by	Written by	Original release date	UK viewers (millions)
1	"Episode One"	Jakob Verbruggen	Tom Rob Smith	9 November 2015	3.63
Warehouse worker Danny is recovering from a drug-induced haze when he encounters Alex jogging. They connect with one another, and become lovers. Danny introduces Alex to his older friend Scottie, and confesses to Alex about his past. Soon afterwards Alex disappears, and then Danny's flat is ransacked. Danny is mysteriously given the key to Alex's apartment, where he discovers Alex's dead body in a room dedicated to sado-masochism. He telephones the police, but remembering Alex's last words to him, he swallows a code-locked cylinder he finds in the battery compartment of Alex's laptop. The police tell Danny that Alex had lied to him: his name was actually Alistair and he wasn’t an orphan. Scottie collects Danny from the police after supplying him with a solicitor, and tells him that Alex/Alistair was working for MI6. Before he leaves, Scottie tells him that the police were wondering if he had taken anything from Alex/Alistair's apartment. Danny lies and later passes the object he had swallowed.
2	"Episode Two"	Jakob Verbruggen	Tom Rob Smith	16 November 2015	2.64
Convinced that he is being followed, Danny hides the device he discovered. He contacts a newspaper to correct the news coverage about Alex/Alistair and report it was murder; instead it prints a story about his own drug taking, and he loses his job. Scottie tells Danny about his history with MI6 30 years ago and shows him where he attempted suicide at the time. Danny is invited to visit by a couple who claim to be Alex/Alistair's parents and who behave strangely distant. He refuses to believe them and is taken to a mansion belonging to Frances and her husband, where she informs him that Alistair, her son, was neither gay nor a virgin, but very experienced in sexual roleplay. When Danny does not believe her, Frances tells him to stop making a fuss. The next morning, the housekeeper reveals that his real name was Alistair but he preferred the name Alex. Danny returns to London and is approached by an American who tells him to look after his health. He leaves behind a sweet containing a tablet and a business card which Danny rips up.
3	"Episode Three"	Jakob Verbruggen	Tom Rob Smith	23 November 2015	2.31
Danny is arrested, and admits to having experimented with auto-asphyxiation. The interrogators show him the logo of a rent boy agency they say Alex used, and suggest he confess that, while high on drugs, he accidentally asphyxiated him. If not, he will be charged if they discover his DNA on the sheets in the attic room. Once released, Danny visits an old acquaintance, a record producer called Rich, and asks for help to find the rent boy agency. Rich offers to help in return for sex, but Danny refuses. Danny's flatmate informs him that the tablet left by the American is anti-HIV medication. Danny is tested, and told that he is HIV positive. Scottie takes Danny to see a friend who says she will try to arrange a meeting with Alex’s old professor who may be able to make sense of the contents of the code-locked cylinder which he took from Alex's flat. Later, at Scottie's club, Scottie blackmails a former colleague into revealing that every major espionage agency agreed Alex was a threat. Later, Danny is walking when a car draws up. Rich is in the back, and gives him a phone.
4	"Episode Four"	Jakob Verbruggen	Tom Rob Smith	30 November 2015	2.15
The phone directs Danny to a meeting with a man who says he is an escort, hired to seduce Alex. Danny was not invited to Alex’s funeral, so goes to a beach, burns what possessions he has of Alex, and scatters the ashes into the sea. He recalls talking there to Alex about being "the one" for each other. He tries "0000001" for the code cylinder and it opens, revealing a USB plug. He and Scottie meet Alex's professor who tells them it contains research on a method of determining if someone is lying from their speech patterns. The police tell Danny he will not be charged with Alex's murder, he responds that "This isn't over". Scottie calls him from a locked cab, telling him "There will be a note". Danny runs to the park they met in earlier and finds Scottie's body hanging from a tree.
5	"Episode Five"	Jakob Verbruggen	Tom Rob Smith	7 December 2015	2.06
Detective Taylor tells Danny that she believes what he has told her but is unable to investigate further because of pressure from her superiors. Danny sends out copies of Alex's research by post and email to newspapers: they are all returned or deleted. Danny’s estranged mother turns up at his home out of the blue saying that his father is dying; at his parents’ house they admit they have been threatened, it was a charade to erase the code cylinder that Danny wears around his neck. Danny visits Frances and learns about Alex/Alistair’s childhood, her own thwarted ambitions in MI5, and how she brought him up to be the spy she couldn’t be. Her part in the events leading to his death is shown – he was killed by MI5 to keep his research secret. Though believing it futile, she joins Danny to try to bring those responsible to justice.

== Critical reception ==
Reviewing Episode One for The Guardian, Lucy Mangan called it "an unutterably delicious, satisfying dish," with "Jim Broadbent, in fully teddy-bear-carrying-a-switchblade mode.." and Whishaw "the most powerful actor ever made out of thistledown and magic." The Daily Telegraph's Jasper Rees was unconvinced: "Whishaw's intense fixity of purpose could do nothing to defibrillate his DOA dialogue..." The same newspaper's Harry Mount gave a critical review of episode 3 which he regarded as "wearily unconvincing" with "long spells of ennui."

After Episode 4 had screened, several prominent critics agreed that, whatever they thought of its story, the series possessed a haunting quality. Gabriel Tate of The Daily Telegraph wrote: "London Spy, has been adored and abhorred. Its ambition has delighted and infuriated, its obfuscation has intrigued and frustrated. It is, if nothing else, a singular vision..." A.A. Gill of The Sunday Times wrote: "This is a strange, inexplicably compelling story. There are vast lacunas in the plot, filled with the unblinking performance of Ben Whishaw, made more memorable because most of it is done without words. Everyone else revolves around him, but he remains essentially a hole at the centre of the doughnut. It is a characterisation of great depth, in a plot that is nothing more than a series of enigmas, presented enigmatically."

Jack Seale in The Guardian called it an "intoxicating series" with "a beguiling emotional aesthetic." "It was inevitable that, when prosaic explanation finally had to intrude on all this elliptical artistry, the spell was partly broken. A thriller hasn't so boldly made the genre beautiful since The Shadow Line. London Spy has lived in the gap between plot and subtext – between what it's about, and what it's really about. It's really about self-knowledge, and how lovers try to know each other while lying about themselves."

Following the screening of the final episode, Gabriel Tate wrote in The Guardian that the series had "a somewhat daft and implausible ending, but there was still much to enjoy, mostly from the brilliant Ben Whishaw." Benji Wilson in The Daily Telegraph called it "wonderful and infuriating in equal measure..Has there ever been a television series that's frustrated as much as London Spy (BBC 2)? Over five weeks this contemporary thriller has scaled giddy heights and then plumbed ludicrous depths, gone from being completely gripping to turgid as hell, thrown up single scenes of startling brilliance then followed them with some preposterous self-indulgence... London Spy's potentially great script was in desperate need of some doughty editing."

The Guardian's Mark Lawson named the series one of the best shows of 2015.

The series was nominated for the British Academy Television Award for Best Mini-Series, the GLAAD Media Award for Outstanding TV Movie or Limited Series. and the Royal Television Society Award for Mini-Series.
