= Alias Grace (miniseries) =

2017 Canadian television miniseries

- Genre: Drama
- Based on: Alias Grace by Margaret Atwood
- Written by: Sarah Polley
- Directed by: Mary Harron
- Starring: Sarah Gadon; Edward Holcroft; Rebecca Liddiard; Zachary Levi; Kerr Logan; David Cronenberg; Paul Gross; Anna Paquin
- Music by: Jeff Danna; Mychael Danna
- Ending theme: "Let No Man Steal Your Thyme" by Anne Briggs
- Country of origin: Canada
- Original language: English
- No. of episodes: 6

Production
- Executive producers: Sarah Polley; Mary Harron; Noreen Halpern
- Producers: D.J. Carson; Sarah Polley
- Production locations: Toronto, Ontario; Kingston, Ontario
- Cinematography: Brendan Steacy
- Editor: David Wharnsby
- Production companies: Halfire Entertainment; Tangled Inc.

Original release
- Network: CBC Television
- Release: September 25 – October 30, 2017

Alias Grace is a Canadian drama television miniseries directed by Mary Harron and written by Sarah Polley, based on Margaret Atwood's 1996 novel of the same name. It stars Sarah Gadon, Edward Holcroft, Rebecca Liddiard, Zachary Levi, Kerr Logan, David Cronenberg, Paul Gross, and Anna Paquin. The series consists of six episodes. It premiered on CBC on September 25, 2017, and appeared on Netflix on November 3, 2017.

In advance of the series premiere, the first two episodes received a preview screening at the 2017 Toronto International Film Festival in its Primetime lineup of selected television programming.

The series was the third adaptation of an Atwood novel broadcast on television in 2017, after The Handmaid's Tale (adapted for Hulu) and Wandering Wenda (adapted for CBC Television's CBC Kids lineup).

Atwood served as a supervising producer on the miniseries.

== Cast ==
=== Main ===
- Sarah Gadon as Grace Marks
- Edward Holcroft as Dr. Simon Jordan, a psychiatrist
- Rebecca Liddiard as Mary Whitney, Grace's friend
- Zachary Levi as Jeremiah the Peddler / Dr Jerome DuPont
- Kerr Logan as James McDermott, Kinnear's stableman
- David Cronenberg as Reverend Verrenger, a committee member who wants Grace acquitted
- Anna Paquin as Nancy Montgomery, Kinnear's housekeeper
- Paul Gross as Thomas Kinnear, a wealthy man who hires Grace

=== Recurring ===
- Martha Burns as Mrs. Parkinson
- Will Bowes as George Parkinson
- Sarah Manninen as Mrs. Humphrey
- Stephen Joffe as Jamie Walsh
- Michael Therriault as Mr. McDonald

=== Guest ===
- Margaret Atwood as old woman at church
- Ian D. Clark as priest

== Episodes ==
No.	Title	Directed by	Written by	Original release date	Canada viewers (millions)
1	"Part 1"	Mary Harron	Sarah Polley	September 25, 2017	0.442
Dr. Simon Jordan is hired to perform a psychiatric evaluation of high-profile murderer Grace Marks, who supporters hope will be set free as a result of Jordan's report. Grace has been imprisoned for murder for the past 15 years while her co-conspirator James McDermott was hanged. Though she has no memory of the actual murders, she tells Jordan about immigrating from Ireland to Canada and finding employment as a maid. Her mother died on the voyage, and her abusive and alcoholic father sexually assaulted her. Her father demands that she go earn a living and support the family. She is distressed at the idea of leaving her younger siblings alone and promises to come back. She leaves to find work in Toronto. Throughout the conversations with Jordan, she has flashbacks involving the murders, trial and conviction.
2	"Part 2"	Mary Harron	Sarah Polley	October 2, 2017	N/A
Jordan appears to have developed an interest in Grace and fantasizes about her. Grace tells him about her friendship with Mary Whitney, another maid. Mary is outgoing and an advocate for equality; she attempts to impart these ideas to Grace and the two quickly become friends. Grace is introduced to a peddler named Jeremiah who reads her fortune, telling her that she will encounter difficulties but all will be fine. Eventually, Mary becomes pregnant but refuses to tell Grace who the father is, although it is implied that it is the son of the master of the house. Mary later dies of complications from an abortion, and Grace hallucinates that she hears Mary speaking to her. She then faints, lies unconscious for a period of time, wakes up in distress looking for Grace and claims she is Mary, then faints again. Once she regains consciousness the second time, she says she doesn't have any memory of what the other women in the house told her she had said and done.
3	"Part 3"	Mary Harron	Sarah Polley	October 9, 2017	N/A
Jordan continues to fantasize about Grace while they continue their sessions, speaking of the events after Mary's death. Grace meets Nancy, a housekeeper for Mr. Thomas Kinnear. Nancy offers Grace a job with more pay. Though another maid warns Grace not to take the job, she accepts, in part because Nancy reminds Grace of Mary. After arriving at the farm in Richmond Hill, Ontario, Grace meets Jamie, a younger farm boy, as well as James McDermott, a farmworker. Nancy dislikes McDermott because of his abrupt and explosive personality, and Nancy shows a strictness about the way things should be handled in the home. McDermott flirts with Grace, who does not reciprocate. Nancy gives Grace a tour of the house, including the cellar where the murders will take place.
4	"Part 4"	Mary Harron	Sarah Polley	October 16, 2017	N/A
Jordan has developed an obsession with Grace while his landlady, Mrs. Humphrey, is attracted to him. Grace continues to recount her life's story to him. When Nancy decides to dismiss McDermott, McDermott tells Grace that Nancy and Mr. Kinnear are sleeping together. Grace loses respect for Nancy upon finding out that Nancy is pregnant, and they begin to quarrel. According to Grace, McDermott says that they should kill Nancy and Kinnear and throw their bodies down the cellar. However, according to McDermott's written confession, Grace wanted to murder Nancy and Kinnear by poisoning them but McDermott refused to help her. Jeremiah comes to say goodbye due to a change in career, and asks Grace to run away with him, but she decides not to when he says he does not believe in marriage. Grace overhears Nancy considering dismissing her because she is quarrelsome. Grace later dreams that she is assaulted by men, including McDermott and Kinnear. She dreams of headless angels in bloody robes, which she interprets as a sign of God's judgement against Kinnear's household.
5	"Part 5"	Mary Harron	Sarah Polley	October 23, 2017	N/A
Jeremiah reappears in the present, fashioning himself a neuro-hypnotist known as Dr. DuPont, but only Grace is aware of his true identity. He suggests putting Grace into a trance to try and access her memories. Though Jordan disagrees, Grace is willing to allow Jeremiah to hypnotize her. Grace later tells Jordan that she tried to warn Nancy about McDermott's threats of killing her and Kinnear, but she shrugs it off. When Kinnear went away on a trip, Nancy used this opportunity to fire McDermott and Grace. Grace's confession says that McDermott hit Nancy and threw her into the cellar, where he strangled her with Grace's kerchief, but she says she cannot remember this, and that her lawyer dictated her confession. After Kinnear arrived home, McDermott shot him and attempted to shoot Grace as well, and she fainted from fright. Another period of amnesia follows; McDermott confessed that Grace coerced him to kill both Kinnear and Nancy with the promise of marriage. The couple were arrested in a bed and breakfast inn. In the courtroom, Jamie's statement says that he saw Grace in the yard, and that she lied to him about the whereabouts of the victims at that time. That night, Jordan fantasizes about Grace coming to visit him in bed, only to realize that Grace is Mrs. Humphrey. Distressed, he leaves the city by train the next day.
6	"Part 6"	Mary Harron	Sarah Polley	October 30, 2017	N/A
Jordan visits Grace's lawyer in Toronto, who tells him that Grace is likely guilty and may have a crush on him. At their next meeting, he encourages Grace to be hypnotized, and she accepts his recommendation. Jeremiah hypnotizes Grace, who takes on the persona and voice of Mary. Jordan asks her if she ever had relations with McDermott, and she, as Mary, claims that the two kissed passionately, which is described as a method to anger and make Jordan jealous. She attempts to provoke him, saying that she knows of his feelings for her. She also claims to have tried to string both McDermott and Kinnear along. Mary claims that she murdered Nancy, but that Grace does not know of Mary's existence, insinuating that Grace was innocent. During the hypnotism, there are various flashbacks/versions of the murder played, some in which Grace is distressed by the deaths and others in which she participates. Mary's presence is apparently due to a Catholic superstition that Grace previously spoke about in which after a person dies, a window must be opened to let their soul out, which Grace didn't properly do for Mary. Once Jeremiah brings her out of her trance, Grace appears to have no awareness of what she said, and says she must have been asleep. Jordan is offended by this turn of events and leaves town to see his mother. He refuses to write a report about Grace's case because he cannot be sure if the entire ordeal was a farce. He goes on to succumb to Mrs. Humphrey's attempted seduction, and they have sex before demeaning her and leaving abruptly. Jordan continues to ponder and think of Grace and he joins the army in an attempt to distract himself. Grace is hurt by Jordan's departure without saying goodbye. Eleven years later, Grace receives a pardon and is released from prison. She is surprised to be reunited with Jamie Walsh, who apologizes for his role in her conviction and asks her to marry him. After hesitating, she accepts. The two lead a pleasant life, and Grace now has the Jersey cow and Leghorn chickens Mary predicted she would have when they were teenagers, as well as a husband whose name begins with "J" as Mary foresaw. Grace declines Jamie's suggestion of hired help and is also troubled by his constant questioning on her life in the asylum, which reminds her of Jordan and his apologies for the pain he's caused her. The narration now becomes known as a long letter Grace is writing to Jordan. Unbeknownst to her, he was severely injured in the American Civil War and was left in a semi-catatonic state. His mother reads him the letter, and Jordan, who has not uttered a word in years, emits the single word "Grace". The series closes with Grace sewing a quilt of her own, which includes pieces of fabric worn by Nancy and Mary so that the women remain close to her.

== Production ==
Public domain paintings from Statens Museum for Kunst (SMK; the national gallery of Denmark) decorate central locations in the series, among them the house of the Parkinson family where Grace Marks works as a maid, and the governor's mansion where she meets with Dr. Jordan. SMK provides free access to its public domain collection, and the scenographers have used a range of the museum's paintings, primarily from the 18th and 19th centuries.

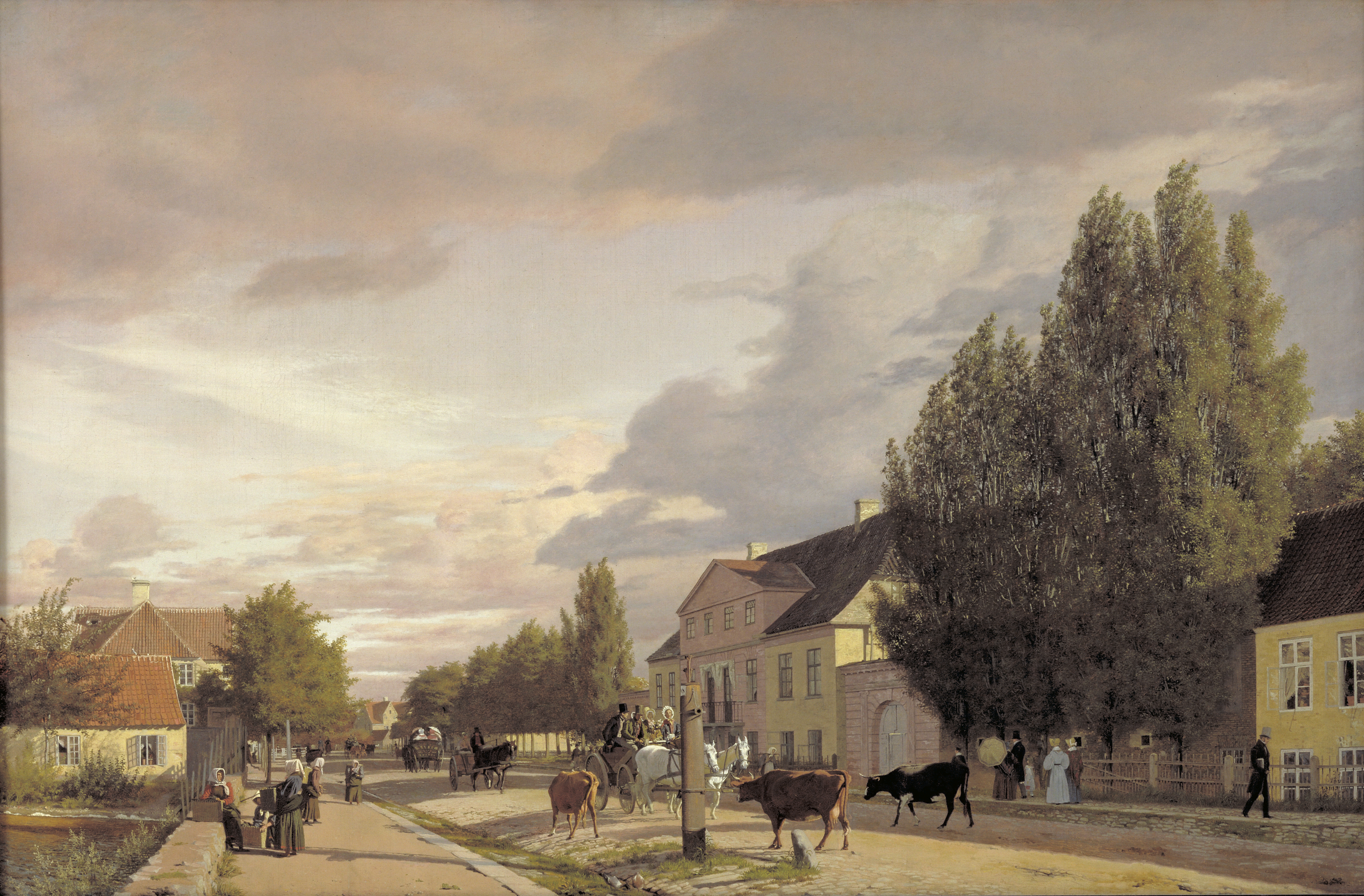
Seen in Parkinson's house: Christen Købke, View of a Street in Østerbro outside Copenhagen. Morning Light, 1836.

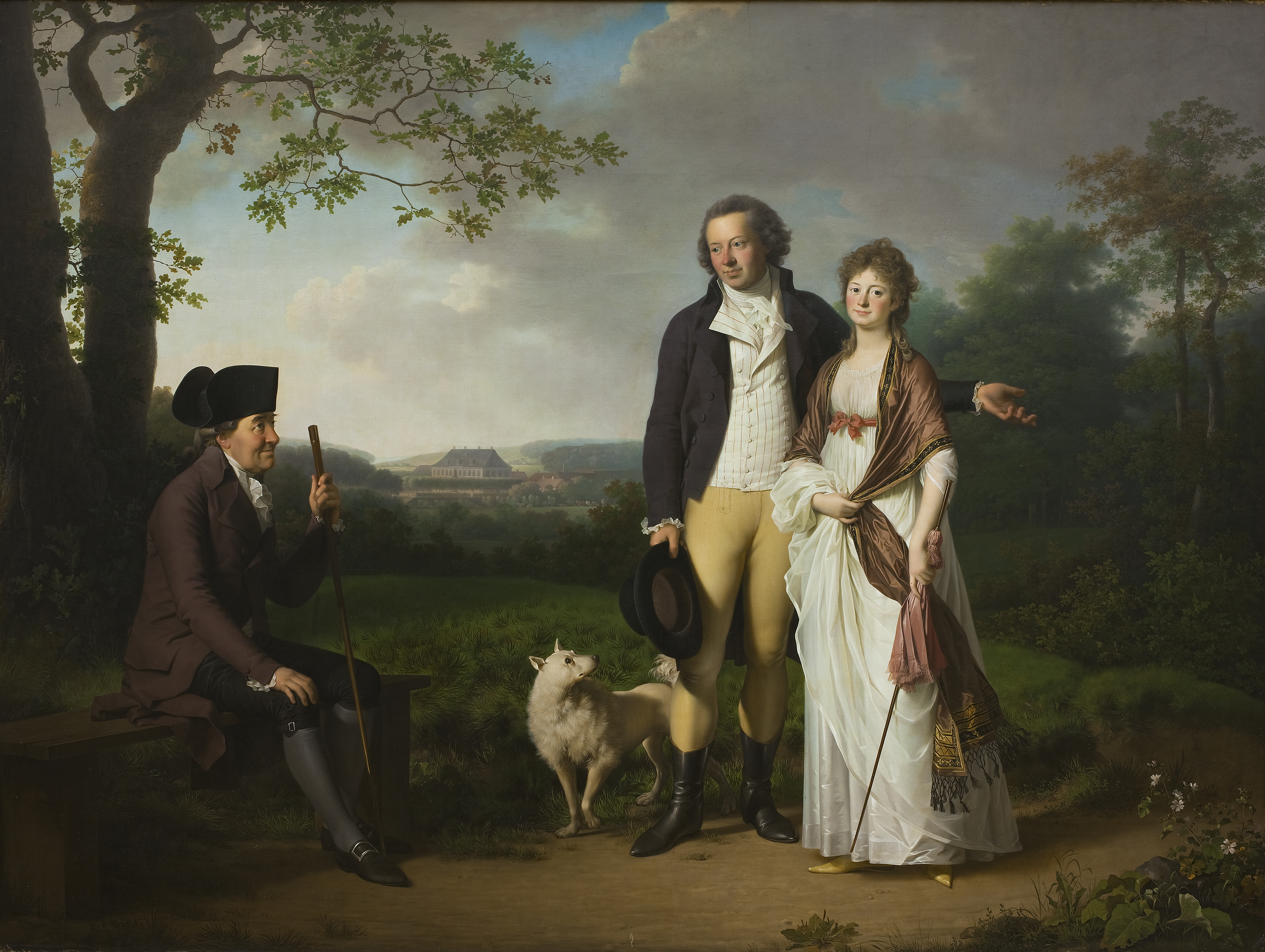
Seen in Parkinson's house: Jens Juel, Niels Ryberg with his Son Johan Christian and his Daughter-in-Law Engelke, née Falbe, 1797.

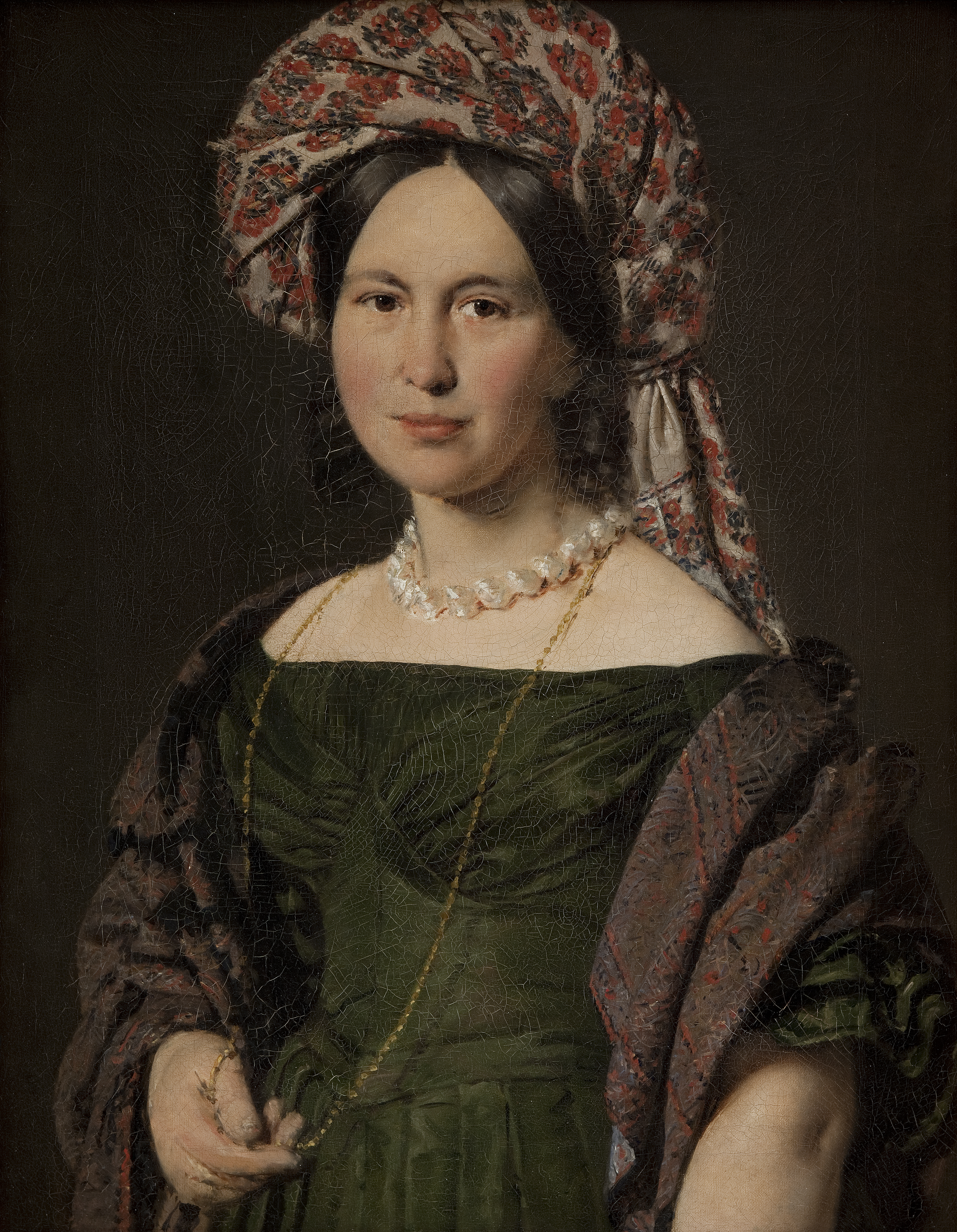
Seen in Parkinson's house: C.A. Jensen, Cathrine Jensen, née Lorenzen, the artist's Wife, Wearing a Turban, c. 1842–44.

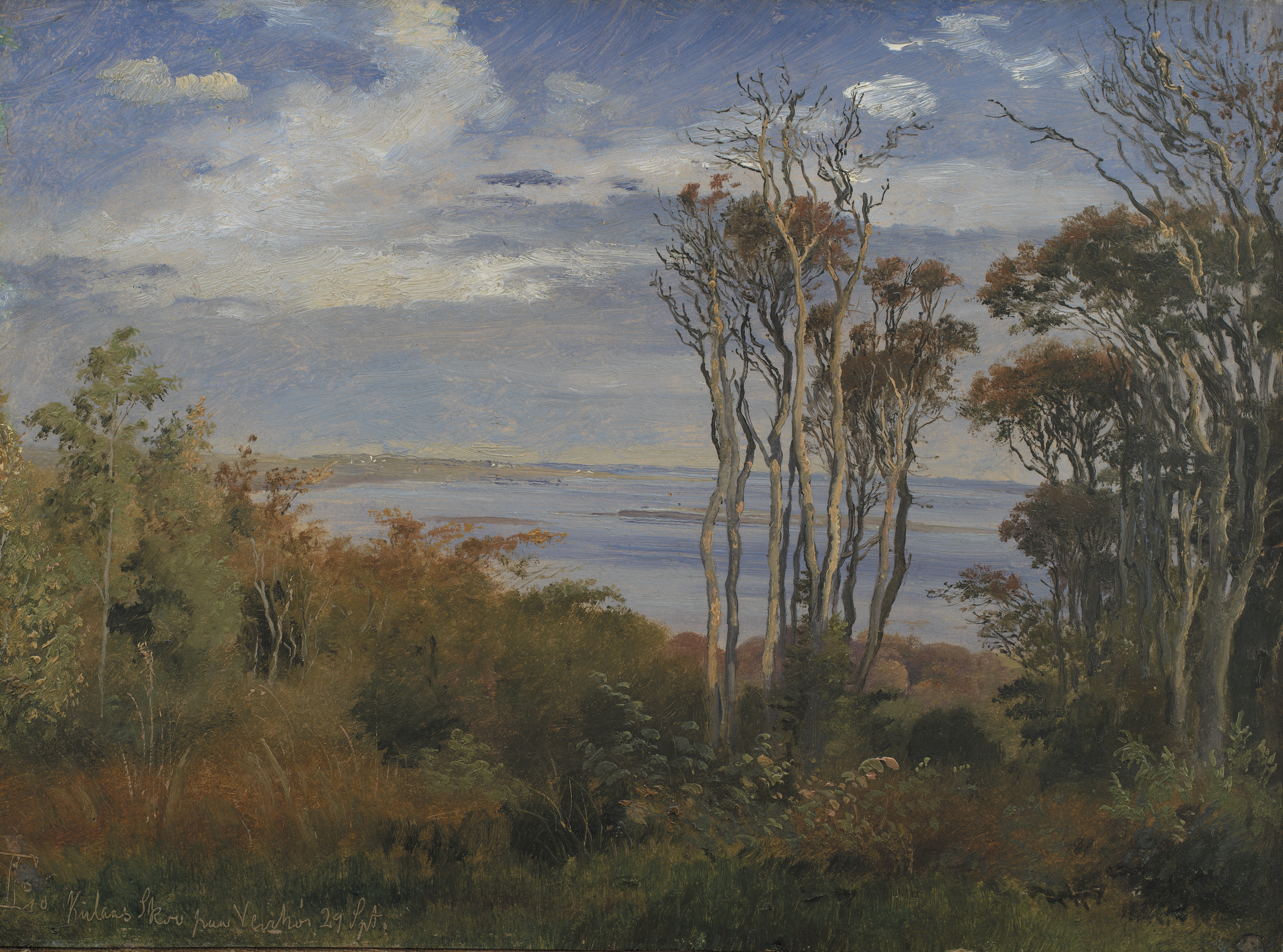
Seen in Parkinson's house: Johan Thomas Lundbye, Kolås Wood. Vejrhøj, 1846.

Seen in Parkinson's house: Constantin Hansen, The Arch of Titus in Rome, 1839.

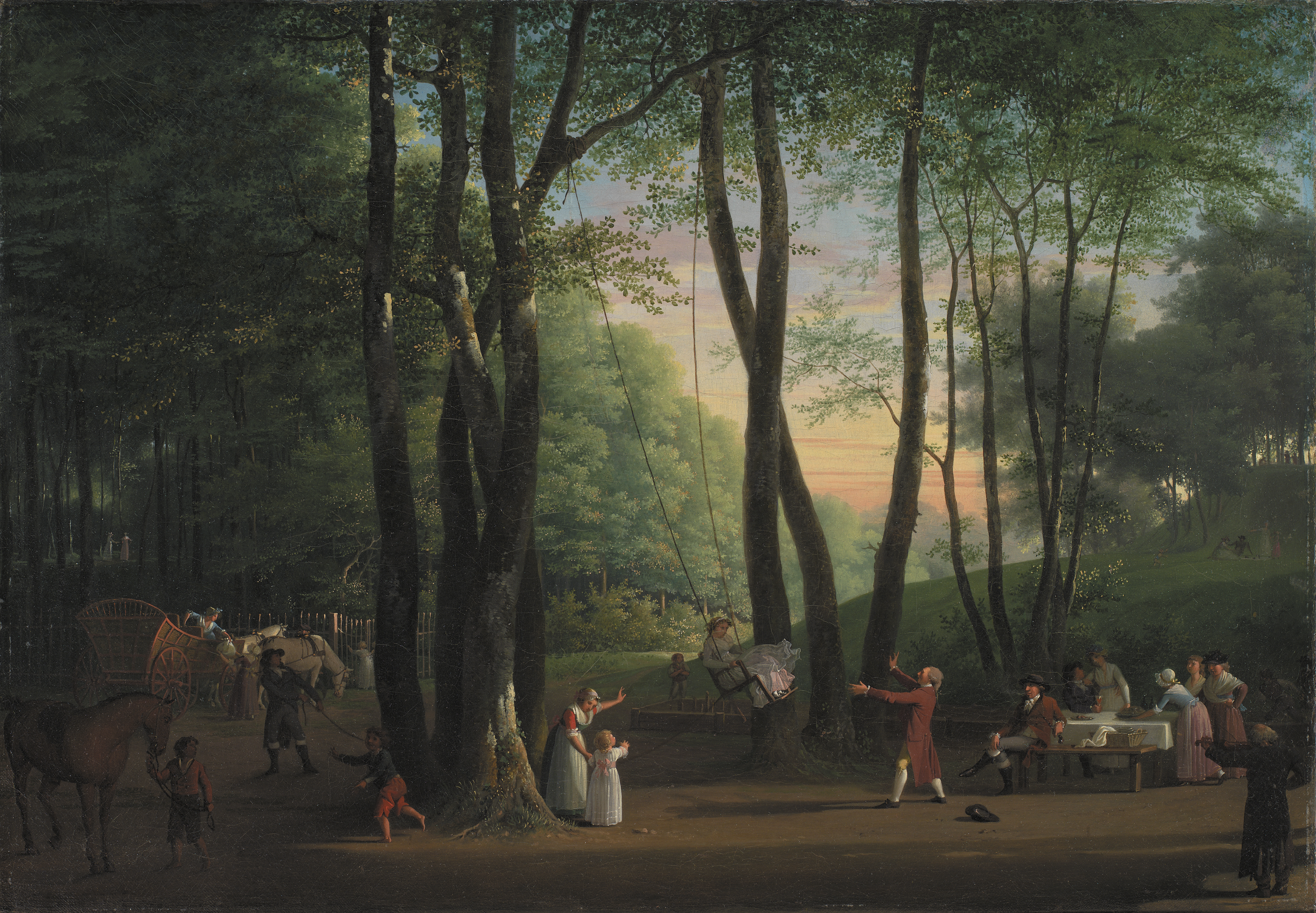
Seen in Parkinson's house: Jens Juel, The Dancing Glade at Sorgenfri, North of Copenhagen, 1800.

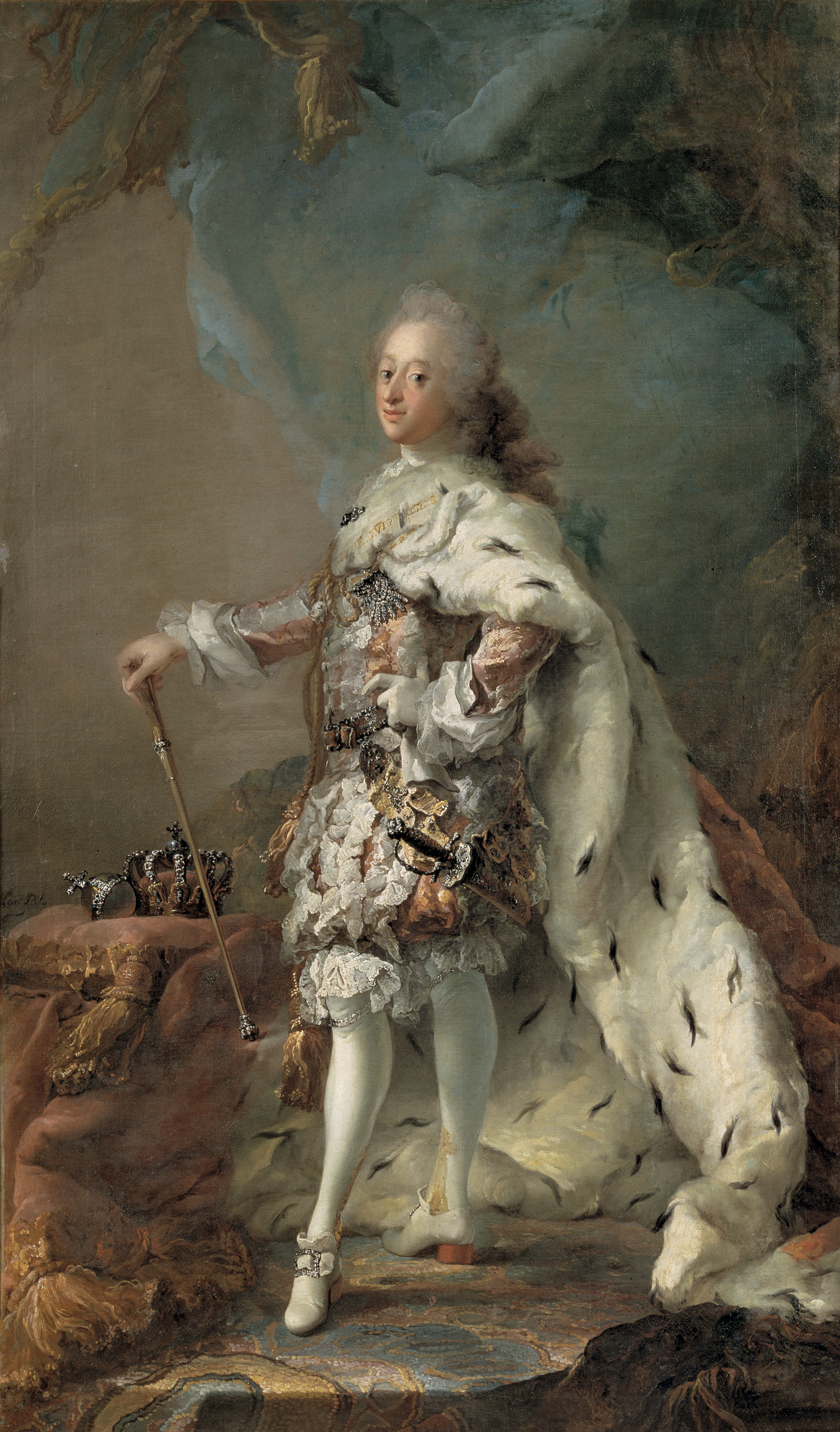
Seen in Parkinson's house: Carl Gustaf Pilo, Portrait of Frederik V in Anointment Robe, about 1750.

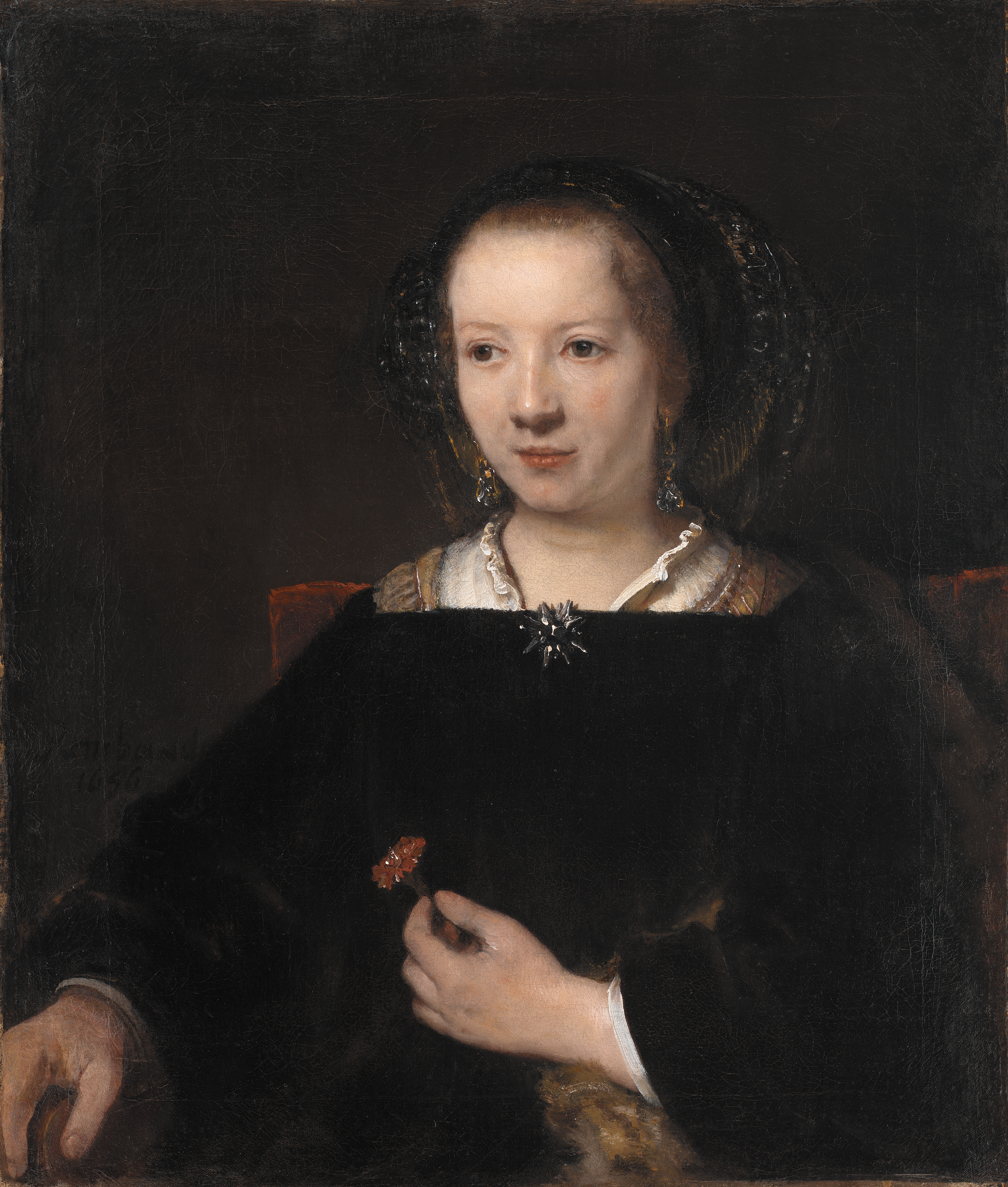
Seen in the governor's mansion: Rembrandt's workshop, Willem Drost?, Young Woman with a Carnation, 1656.

The prison scenes were shot on location at Kingston Penitentiary in Kingston, Ontario where the real Grace Marks, who formed the basis of Atwood's character, was incarcerated. Scenes were also filmed at the Correctional Service of Canada Museum in the old Warden's residence.

== Reception ==
On Metacritic, the series received a score of 81 out of 100 based on 30 reviews, indicating "universal acclaim". The miniseries has a 99% approval rating on Rotten Tomatoes, with an average rating of 8.00 out of 10 based on 82 reviews. The site's critical consensus is: "Biting social commentary and Sarah Gadon's hypnotic performance make Alias Grace a worthy addition to the Margaret Atwood adaptation catalog".
