= Christopher Kelly (civil servant) =

Sir Christopher William Kelly, KCB (born 18 August 1946) is a former senior British Civil Servant who was the Chairman of the Committee on Standards in Public Life and Chairman of the NSPCC.

== Early life ==
Born in Bromley, Kent, Kelly is the son of Dr. Reginald Kelly (1917–1990), a former President of the Association of British Neurologists. He attended the independent Beaumont College. He studied economics at Trinity College, Cambridge and the University of Manchester.

== Civil Service career ==
His first senior appointment in the Civil Service started when he was appointed Private Secretary to the Financial Secretary in 1971, a post he held until 1973. From 1978 to 1980 he was Secretary to the Wilson Committee of Inquiry into Financial Institutions. He held various other appointments in the Civil Service, including Director of Fiscal & Monetary Policy (1994–95). He was the Head of Policy Group in the Department of Social Security from 1995 to 1997.

He was the Permanent Secretary to the Department of Health from 1997 to 2000, while Frank Dobson and later Alan Milburn were the Secretary of State.

== Post Civil Service career ==
A report written by him, and published in July 2004, looked into the agencies which dealt with Soham murderer Ian Huntley and why 'alarm bells' did not ring sooner that Huntley should not be allowed to work with children.

Sir Christopher Kelly became the Chairman of the NSPCC in 2002, and in January 2005 became chairman of the Financial Ombudsman Service, serving until January 2012.

On 5 December 2007, Kelly was chosen by the British Prime Minister Gordon Brown to become the Chairman of the Committee on Standards in Public Life.

In October 2010 he was appointed chairman of the King's Fund.

In December 2012 he was appointed chairman of the Responsible Gambling Strategy Board (RGSB), starting in April 2013. He is a Non-executive member and chairs the oversight board of the Office of Budget Responsibility. He is a senior independent non-executive director on the board of the Co-operative Group, chairing the board of the insurance group, and is a member of the advisory board to the Institute of Business Ethics. The Co‑operative Group and The Co-operative Bank announced in July 2013 that an independent review of the bank's capital financing would be chaired by Kelly. The report, highlighting the bank's governance and management failings, was published on 30 April 2014.

== Recognition ==
In 2001, he was created a Knight Commander of the Order of the Bath.

== Personal life ==
He married Alison Durant in 1970 in St Marylebone, and they have two sons and a daughter. He lives in north London.

Government offices
Preceded by Graham Hart	Permanent Secretary at the Department of Health; 1997–2000	Succeeded by Sir Nigel Crisp
