= Sher Mohammed Khan Sherani =

Member of the Senate
- In office 1981–1984

Personal details
- Born: 1916 Davuilevu, Fiji
- Died: 20 August 1988 (aged 71–72) Suva, Fiji

Sher Mohammed Khan Sherani OBE (1916 – 20 August 1988) was an Indo-Fijian businessman, community activist and politician. He served as a member of the Senate from 1981 to 1984 and as president of the Fiji Muslim League in two spells from 1961 until his death.

== Biography ==
Sherani was born in Davuilevu in 1916. He trained to be as a teacher, but took over the family transport business following the death of his father in 1934. He also became president of the Fiji Muslim League between 1961 and 1966, and then again from 1973 until his death.

In 1981 he was appointed to the Senate as one of the nominees of Prime Minister Kamisese Mara. He remained a Senator until 1984 and was awarded an OBE in the 1987 New Year Honours. He died in Suva in August 1988. His brother Faiz also served as a Senator and Fiji's High Commissioner to Australia.
