= Diana Edwards-Jones =

Welsh television director (1932–2024)

Diana Edwards-Jones OBE
- Born: Diana Elizabeth Edwards-Jones; 13 December 1932; Swansea, Wales
- Died: 14 April 2024 (aged 91)
- Occupation: Television director
- Years active: 1955–1989

Diana Elizabeth Edwards-Jones OBE (13 December 1932 – 14 April 2024) was a Welsh television director. She joined the news production company Independent Television News (ITN) as a stage manager in 1955 and was promoted to the role of programme director in 1961 and later head of programme directors in the 1970s. Edwards-Jones was a director of the daily half-hour News at Ten bulletin when it was launched in 1967. She directed other programmes such as royal documentaries, general elections in the United Kingdom and the Budget of the United Kingdom. Edwards-Jones introduced the earpiece for newsreaders to permit direct communication between the control room and newscasters and the practice of interspersing a short headline with the hour chimes of Big Ben during News at Ten's title sequence.

== Early life and education ==
Edwards-Jones was born on 13 December 1932, in Swansea, South Wales. She was an only child, and was raised in Morriston close to Swansea. Edwards-Jones's parents were the general practitioner John Edwards-Jones and his wife Nancy (née Davies). She was educated at Battle Abbey School for Girls in Sussex, where she was a boarder. After leaving school in August 1950 when she was 17, a desire for a career in theatre led Edwards-Jones to study at the National College of Music and Drama in Cardiff and later the Bristol Old Vic drama school. She performed walk-on roles as an actress. Edwards-Jones did not attend university, but instead was employed as an assistant stage manager to the Maudie Edwards Players repertory company at the Palace Theatre, Swansea. She also did some acting at the Bristol Old Vic and the Swansea Grand Theatre (of which she was manager from 1952 to 1955), the latter with the company run by Terence Dudley.

== Career ==
In 1955, while working at the Palace Theatre, she observed an advertisement for stage managers for the independent television franchise Rediffusion and applied to it as well as a job as a BBC studio manager. Rediffusion rejected her application because she was a woman but suggested that she apply for a similar role to the ITV news production company Independent Television News (ITN). Edwards-Jones passed her interview with ITN, exaggerating her experience as a stage manager and lying about being able to type. She took a typing course in Wales to justify the lie she told ITN. Edwards-Jones moved to London, and was one of ITN's founder members. She typed scripts and arranged still photographs from agencies and newspapers. Edwards-Jones began working as a floor manager when ITN was launched on 22 September 1955.

In 1961, she was promoted to the job of programme director. Edwards-Jones worked alongside David Nicholas in the control room and introduced earpieces for newsreaders to permit direct communication between the control room and newscasters. Six years later, she was one of the first directors of the daily half-hour News at Ten bulletin. She was credited with introducing the practice of interspersing a short headline with the hour chimes of Big Ben that are played during the title sequence after a sound mixer accidentally increased the sound of Big Ben's bongs during rehearsals.

In the 1970s, Edwards-Jones became the head of programme directors, giving her responsibility of organising much of the studio workings at ITN. She was the mentor of newsreader Trevor McDonald. She was also the director of the lunchtime bulletin First Report, the News at 5.45 and Channel 4 News. Edwards-Jones was the director of ITN's coverage of the 1968 United States presidential election and the following year's Apollo 11 moon landing. In 1973, she directed ITN's coverage of the Accession of the United Kingdom to the European Communities and the 1975 United Kingdom European Communities membership referendum.

She became the first woman to direct a live election results programme in the United Kingdom in February 1974 in that month's general election. Edwards-Jones was the director of four more general election programmes. She directed news specials such as the 40th anniversary of the Normandy landings and special royal documentaries such as The Prince and Princess of Wales Talking Personally with Alastair Burnet (an interview with Charles, Prince of Wales and Diana, Princess of Wales), in 1985 and Queen Elizabeth II – 60 Glorious Years in 1986. Edwards-Jones also directed programmes on the Budget of the United Kingdom, and House of Lords proceedings. She retired in 1989.

== Personal life and legacy ==
Edwards-Jones did not marry, and died on 14 April 2024. According to a profile of Edwards-Jones in the ITN newsletter The Lens, she was described as "the bully, the one they learnt from, the one they laughed with and were outraged by. But it was Di who got them through whatever had to be done." She was known for her use of profanity amongst colleagues.

== Awards ==
Edwards-Jones was awarded the Royal Television Society's Award for Outstanding Creative Achievement Behind the Camera in 1975. She was appointed Officer of the Order of the British Empire in the 1987 New Year Honours.
