= Gerry Murphy (rugby union, born 1926) =

Rugby union player from Northern Ireland

- Full name: John Gervase Maurice Walker Murphy
- Born: 20 August 1926 Bangor, Northern Ireland
- Died: 7 January 2014 (aged 87) Norfolk, England
- School: Methodist College Belfast
- University: Trinity College Dublin
- Occupation: Clergy

Rugby union career
- Position: Fullback
International career
Years	Team	Apps	(Points)
1951–58	Ireland	6	(5)

Canon John Gervase Maurice Walker Murphy LVO (20 August 1926 — 7 January 2014) was an army chaplain and international rugby union player from Northern Ireland.

Born in Bangor, County Down, Murphy attended Methodist College Belfast and Trinity College Dublin, in between serving in the Royal Ulster Rifles. He played rugby as a fullback for Ireland while a curate in Lurgan, with appearances against the Springboks and All Blacks amongst his six caps.

Murphy became a Royal Army chaplain in 1955. After 22 years as a chaplain, Murphy was appointed rector of the Norfolk parish of Ranworth and Rural Dean of Blofield. He was later Domestic chaplain to the Queen.

In the 1987 New Year Honours, Murphy was made a Lieutenant of the Royal Victorian Order.

== See also ==
- List of Ireland national rugby union players
