= Brian McMaster =

Sir Brian John McMaster CBE (born 9 May 1943) is an English arts administrator from Hitchin.

== Major positions ==
- Managing director at the Welsh National Opera (1976–1991)
- Director of the Edinburgh International Festival (1991–2006)

=== Edinburgh ===
McMaster moved all of the Edinburgh International Festival staff from London to the Scottish capital and appointed Joanna Baker as director of marketing and public affairs. During his tenure, the Empire Theatre on the Southside was acquired and refurbished as the Festival Theatre, opening in 1994 with Scottish Opera's Tristan and Isolde. Theatre productions included a revival of C.P. Taylor's Good, directed by Michael Boyd.

He received an Honorary Doctorate from Heriot-Watt University in 2000
