= Louis van Praag =

British designer (1926–1923)

Louis van Praag CBE (1921–1993) was a British fashion and industrial designer, described as an influence on a generation of British designers from the 1960s onward. van Praag played a major role in the development of design education in Britain over several decades. A lecturer at the capital's Royal College of Art, he was made chairman of the British government's Committee for Managing Design, and awarded the 1989 Bicentenary Medal by the Royal Society of Arts. His portrait hangs in Britain's National Portrait Gallery.
