= David Scholey =

British merchant banker (born 1935)

Sir David Gerald Scholey CBE FRSA (born 28 June 1935) is a British merchant banker. He is the former chairman and chief executive of S. G. Warburg and was a director of the Bank of England from 1981 to 1998. He is a former governor of the BBC, and a former chairman of the board of trustees of the National Portrait Gallery.

== Early life ==
Scholey was born in Surrey, the son of Dudley Scholey and Lois Hammon. He was educated at Wellington College and Christ Church, Oxford.

== Career ==
Scholey is the former chairman and chief executive of S. G. Warburg. He was a director of the Bank of England from 1981 to 1998. He is a former governor of the BBC, and a former chairman of the board of trustees of the National Portrait Gallery (2001–05). He was non-executive deputy chairman of Anglo American from 1999 to 2001 and has been a director of Sainsbury's Bank.

Scholey was criticized by animal rights groups for shooting a lion during a hunt in Africa.

== Personal life ==
Scholey married Alexandra Beatrix Drew, daughter of Hon. George Drew, and has a son, Christopher, and a daughter, Fiorenza.
