= Simone Prendergast =

Dame Simone Ruth Prendergast DBE DL JP (née Laski; 2 July 1930 – 11 August 2012) was created a member of the UK's Office of the Director of Public Prosecutions' Solicitors Disciplinary Tribunal which reviews cases of malfeasance and/or misconduct against British solicitors.

She was created a Dame Commander of the Order of the British Empire (DBE) in 1986 for her political and public service.

== Jewish Lads' and Girls' Brigade ==
She was the Head and later a Patron of the UK Jewish Lads' and Girls' Brigade.

== Personal life & death ==
Prendergast was born 2 July 1930 in London to Norman and Elaine (née Marks) Laski. Her maternal grandfather, Michael Marks, was a co-founder of Marks & Spencer. She married Christopher Anthony Prendergast in 1959; he died in 1998. She had one sister, Mrs Ann Esther Susman.

Dame Simone Prendergast died at the age of 82 on 11 August 2012.

The Simone Prendergast Charitable Trust was established in her honour.
