= Charles Drace-Francis =

British diplomat

Charles David Stephen Drace-Francis, CMG (born 1943) is a retired British diplomat.

He was educated at Oxford where he took a first-class degree in history in 1964. He shared rooms with Gareth Stedman-Jones and Roderick Floud.

After posts in Teheran, Hong Kong and Brussels, Drace-Francis was appointed British Chargé d'Affaires to Afghanistan from 1984 to 1987, during the Soviet-Afghan War. He was appointed Companion of the Order of St. Michael and St. George for his work in the latter capacity. He was High Commissioner to Papua New Guinea in Port Moresby from 1997 to 2000.

Telegrams of his reports on Conservative Party treasurer Michael Ashcroft in Belize and Turks and Caicos Islands, written in early 1997, were published in The Times in July 1999. Drace-Francis claimed that Ashcroft had "threatened over breakfast to stir up trouble for Britain in the Turks and Caicos Islands unless he was helped to break into the islands' banking business."

As a result of this the Foreign Office's Permanent Under Secretary John Kerr initiated an inquiry with the aim of identifying the source of the leak. The inquiry proved controversial, and Drace-Francis later resigned. As such he won the sympathy of his erstwhile antagonist Michael Ashcroft, who recognised him to be the victim of Whitehall machinations rather than the true source of the leak.
