= Alastair Rellie =

Alastair James Carl Euan Rellie CMG (5 April 1935 – 10 April 2018) was a British intelligence officer with the Secret Intelligence Service (MI6). Alastair Rellie was one of four Directors in the British Secret Intelligence Service (MI6). He was a candidate to become Chief of SIS before retiring in 1992.

== Early life ==
He was born in Buckinghamshire in 1935. His father, a naval officer, died in 1943 and after the War his mother moved to South Africa with Alastair and his three siblings. He was educated at Michaelhouse, Natal, South Africa, after which he worked in New York for a year before studying at Harvard University for four years, where he wrote for The Harvard Crimson. After graduating, Rellie returned to the UK for his National Service in the Rifle Brigade from 1958 to 1960 with basic training at The Rifle Depot in Winchester and officer training at Mons OCS, Aldershot. His subsequent TA commitment was served out with the London Rifle Brigade Rangers.

== Career ==
After National Service he spent a year in the city before applying for the Foreign Office which led to his recruitment by the SIS in 1963. Under cover as a member of the Foreign & Commonwealth Office (FCO) he was posted as SIS station chief to Geneva 1966–68, Cairo 1970–1972, Kinshasa 1972–1974 and New York 1974–1980, interspersed with appointments in London which latterly included being in charge of SIS's technical services which involved oversight of IT at GCHQ, to sophisticated bugging operations, and then Controller Western Hemisphere (North & South America). He also served as Director of Counterintelligence.

After retiring from the SIS in 1992 he became an international affairs advisor for British Aerospace and latterly worked for corporate investigators Kroll.

== Family ==
He married Annalisa Rellie (née Modin) in 1961, who pre-deceased him in 2014. His children include investment banker Euan Rellie, art curator Jemima Rellie, and TV producer and actress Lucasta Cummings.

Rellie was an active member of London's gentlemen's club Brooks's.
