= Andrew Digby =

New Zealand astronomer and ecologist

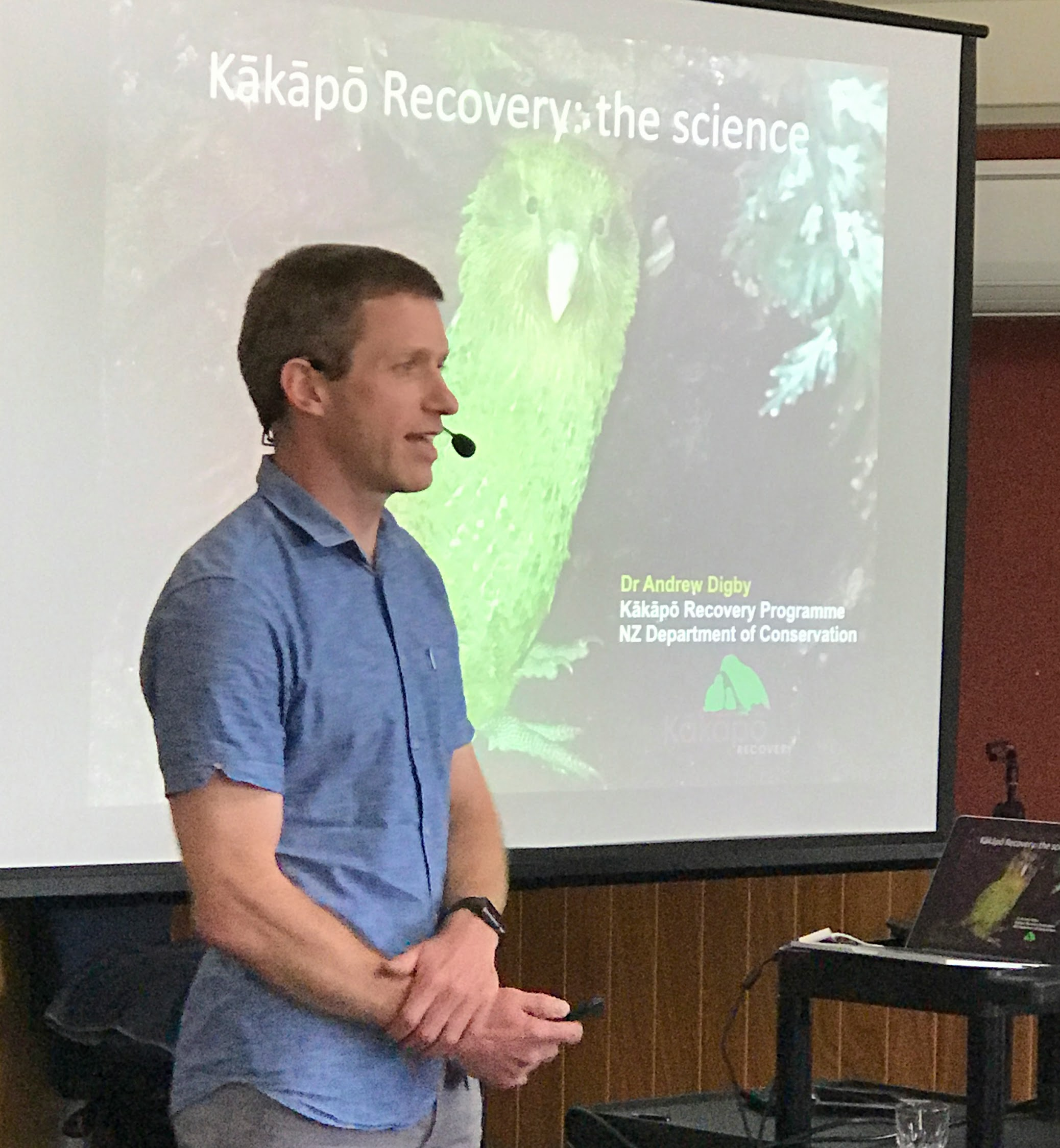
- Digby in 2016
- Born: 1975 (age 50–51); Norwich, United Kingdom
- Education: PhD Astronomy, Edinburgh University, UK 2003 PhD Biology, Victoria University of Wellington, NZ 2013
- Occupations: Astronomer and ecologist
- Employer(s): New Zealand Department of Conservation: Kakapo Recovery Program & Takahe Recovery Program
- Awards: NASA Michelson Postdoctoral Fellow. American Museum of Natural History, New York 2003

Andrew Digby is an astronomer and ecologist whose work focuses on researching and conserving New Zealand's endangered endemic birds.

== Career ==
Digby has a Natural Sciences B.A. (Hons.) from Cambridge and a PhD in astronomy from the University of Edinburgh with a thesis assessing the formation of the galaxy through low-mass stars. He has jointly published numerous papers relating to the detection of dark matter, the luminosity of stars, and exoplanet imaging and spectroscopy. In 2003 he was appointed as the NASA Michelson Postdoctoral Fellow at the Department of Astrophysics, American Museum of Natural History, New York where his research contributed to the design and construction of a coronagraph to directly image planets around other stars.

Digby moved to New Zealand in 2006. After spending several years with the New Zealand meteorological service as a research scientist in the Forecasting Research group, he began a PhD in Conservation Biology at Victoria University of Wellington in 2009. His thesis is titled Whistling in the Dark: An Acoustic Study of Little Spotted Kiwi. He combines all his skills in his present work using acoustic monitoring to track the behaviour of birds in the wild.

He works for the New Zealand Department of Conservation in recovery programs for the Kākāpō and South Island takahē, two endangered birds endemic to New Zealand, and believes he has the perfect job:

“It’s every conservation biologist’s dream: the application of a wide variety of scientific fields and methods to make a real difference to the survival of an endangered species.”

Digby is keen to spread the conservation message: he returned to his alma mater, Cambridge University, to talk about his current projects in July 2016, he has published extensively in the scientific and popular press including New Scientist, and local newspapers and radio. He was invited to speak at the New Zealand Skeptics Conference in Queenstown in December 2016.

== Kiwi research ==
The Kiwi, a flightless bird with a long beak, was the subject of Digby's PhD. His discovery that the birds harmonise their calls to defend their territory is claimed to be the first example of vocal coordination in birds. During his study, Digby used sound recorders and video cameras to track incubation.

== Kākāpō recovery project ==
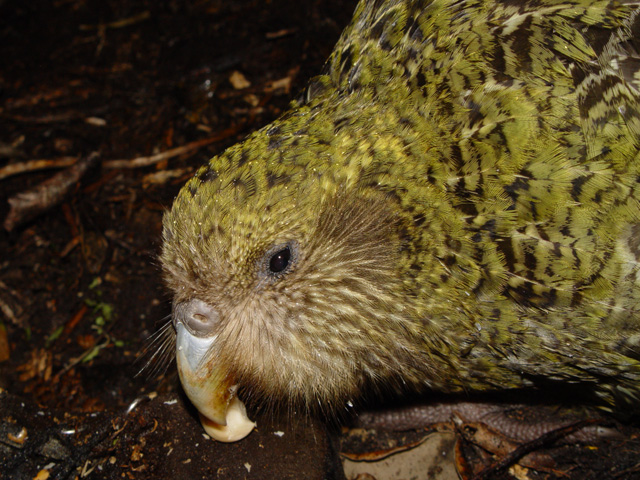
Kākāpō Pura on Codfish Island.

Kākāpō Recovery is a project of the New Zealand Department of Conservation utilising the skills of scientists, rangers and volunteers to protect and boost the numbers of the endangered kākāpō, a flightless parrot. From only 18 individuals in the 1970s, the project's breeding and research program has boosted numbers to a population of 209 adults living on a predator-free islands (2020). Since February 2016, surviving kākāpō are kept on three predator-free islands, Whenua Hou/Codfish, Anchor and Hauturu-o-Toi/Little Barrier islands, where they are closely monitored. In 2016, a record 47 chicks hatched and 33 were fledged. Digby promoted the idea to crowd fund a project to sequence the genome of every living adult kākāpō as well as the genomes of 55 long-dead museum specimens from around the world. This would be the first time genomes will be sequenced for an entire species population and will allow the breeding program to be refined and improved.

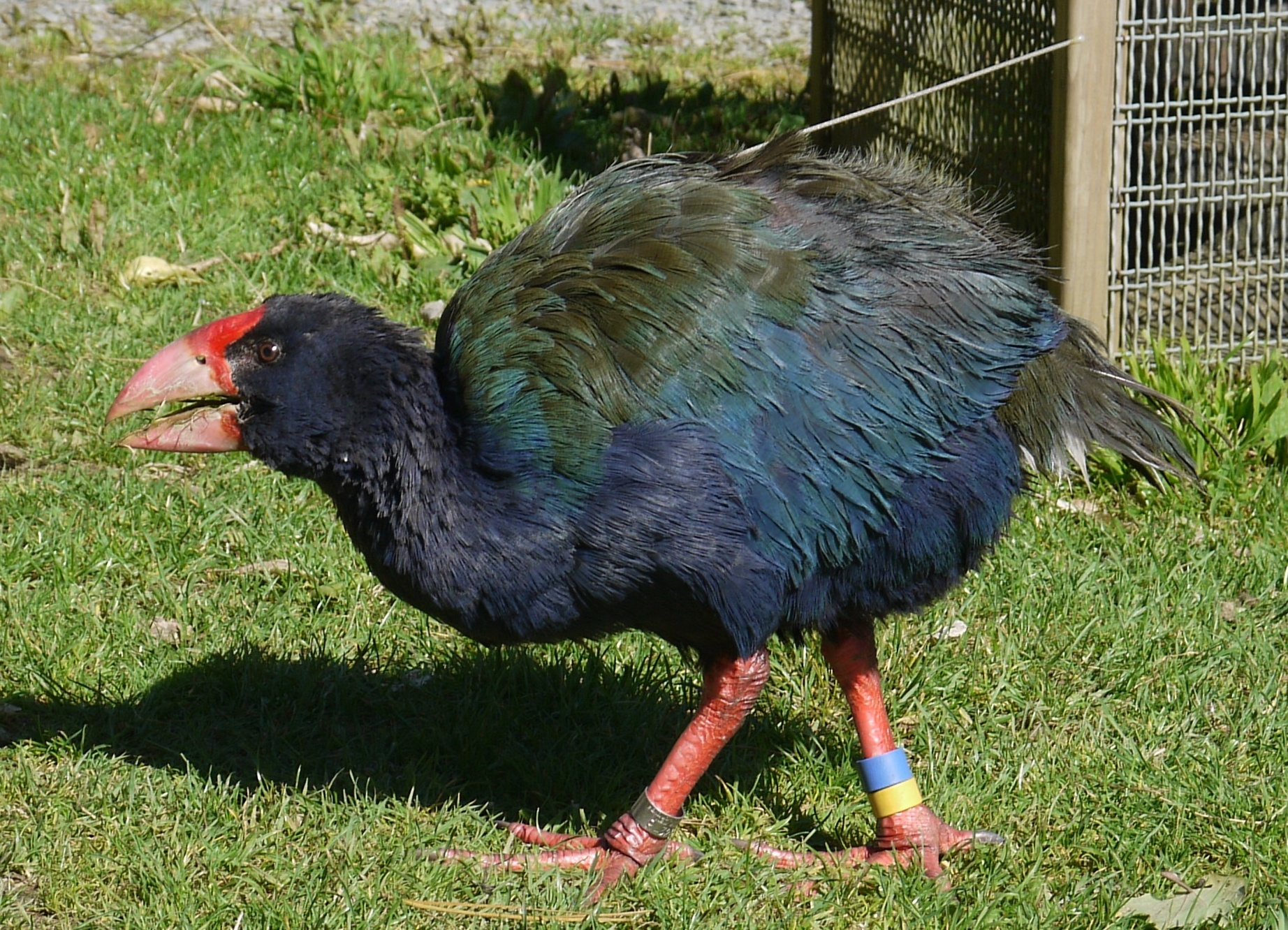
Takahē in Zealandia in Wellington.

== South Island takahē recovery project ==
The South Island takahē is a stout, flightless bird which was thought extinct but found again in 1948 in the remote Murchison Mountains, Fiordland. Conservation efforts have continued but the birds still remain critically endangered with currently 300 adults known. Digby is the scientist on the Takahē Recovery project giving advice on topics such as population dynamics, genetics, predator-prey interactions, avian diseases, and trials of new transmitters.

== Publications ==
=== Articles ===
- Oppenheimer, Ben R.; Hambly, Nigel Charles; Digby Andrew P.; Hodgkin, Simon T.; Saumon, Didier. Direct detection of galactic halo dark matter. Science. 292(5517): 698–702. April 2001
- Oppenheimer, Ben R.; Hambly, Nigel Charles; Digby Andrew P.; Hodgkin, Simon T.; Saumon, Didier, Hodgkin, ST. White dwarfs and dark matter-Response. Science. 292(5525): U3-U5. June 2001
- Digby, A; Cooke, J.; Hambly, N. Galactic Structure and Evolution from Stellar Dynamics EAS Publications Series. 2: 379–381. 2002
- Digby, Andrew P.; Hambly, Nigel C.; Cooke, John A.; Reid, I. Neill; Cannon, Russell D. The subdwarf luminosity function. Monthly Notices of the Royal Astronomical Society. 344(2): 583–601. September 2003
- Oppenheimer, B.R.; Hambly, N.C.; Digby, A.P.; Hodgkin, S.T.; Saumon, D. VizieR Online Data Catalog: Candidate halo dark matter (Oppenheimer+, 2001). VizieR Online Data Catalog. 210:29202. October 2003
- Oppenheimer, BR; Digby, AP; Shara, M; et al. The Lyot Project: Toward Exoplanet and Circumstellar Disk Imaging and Spectroscopy. Bulletin of the American Astronomical Society. 36:583. December 2003
- Sivaramakrishnan, Anand; Oppenheimer, BR; Perrin, MD; Roberts, LC; Makidon, RB; Soummer, R; Digby, AP; Bradford, LW; Skinner, MA; Turner, NH; Ten Brummelaar, TA. Scintillation and pupil illumination in AO coronagraphy. Proceedings of the International Astronomical Union. 1(C200): 613–616. October 2005
- R Soummer, BR Oppenheimer, S Hinkley, A Sivaramakrishnan, RB Makidon, A Digby, D Brenner, J Kuhn, MD Perrin, LC Roberts, Kaitlin Kratter. The Lyot project coronagraph: data processing and performance analysis. EAS Publications Series. 22: 199–212. 2006
- Andrew P Digby, Sasha Hinkley, Ben R Oppenheimer et al. The Challenges of Coronagraphic Astrometry Based on observations made at the Maui Space Surveillance System operated by Detachment 15 of the US Air Force Research Laboratory's Directed Energy Directorate. The Astrophysical Journal. 650 (1): 484. October 2006
- Andrew Digby, Ben D Bell, Paul D Teal. Vocal cooperation between the sexes in Little Spotted Kiwi Apteryx owenii. Ibis. 155(2): 229–245. April 2013
- Andrew Digby, Michael Towsey, Ben D Bell, Paul D Teal. A practical comparison of manual and autonomous methods for acoustic monitoring. Methods in Ecology and Evolution. 4(7): 675–683. July 2013
- Andrew Digby, Ben D Bell, Paul D Teal. Non-linear phenomena in little spotted kiwi calls. Bioacoustics. 23(2): 113–128. May 2014
- Andrew Digby, Michael Towsey, Ben D Bell, Paul D Teal. Temporal and environmental influences on the vocal behaviour of a nocturnal bird. Journal of Avian Biology. 45(6): 591–599. November 2014
- Andrew Digby, Ben D Bell, Paul D Teal. Vocal individuality of Little Spotted Kiwi (Apteryx owenii). Emu. 114(4): 326–336. December 2014
- Rogan Colbourne, Andrew Digby. Call rate behaviour of brown kiwi (Apteryx mantelli) and great spotted kiwi (A. haastii) in relation to temporal and environmental parameters. New Zealand Department of Conservation. DOC Research and Development Series. 348. 2016

=== Theses ===
- Digby, A.P. (2003). Galactic Spheroid Structure from Subluminous Stars. Thesis (Ph.D.) University of Edinburgh
- Digby, Andrew (2013) Whistling in the Dark: An Acoustic Study of Little Spotted Kiwi: a Thesis Submitted to the Victoria University of Wellington in Fulfilment of the Requirements for the Degree of Doctor of Philosophy [in Conservation Biology]

=== Conference Papers ===
- Cooke, JA; Digby, AP; Reid, IN (2001). Wide Field Astrometry: Moving from the UKST to VISTA. The New Era of Wide Field Astronomy, ASP Conference Series, Vol 232, 2001; Roger Clowes, Andrew Adamson, and Gordon Bromage eds, San Francisco: Astronomical Society of the Pacific. p. 272 ISBN 1-58381-065-X
- Oppenheimer, Ben R.; Digby, Andrew P.; Newburgh, Laura; et al. (2003). The Lyot Project: Status and Deployment Plans. AMOS Technical Conference
- Lloyd, James P.; Oppenheimer, Ben R.; Digby Andrew P. The Lyot project: toward exoplanet images and spectroscopy. Earths: DARWIN/TPF and the Search for Extrasolar Terrestrial Planets. 539: 513–518. October 2003
- Oppenheimer, Ben R.; Digby, Andrew P.; Newburgh, Laura; et al. The Lyot project: toward exoplanet imaging and spectroscopy. SPIE Astronomical Telescopes+ Instrumentation. International Society for Optics and Photonics. 433–442. October 2004
- Hambly, NC; Digby, AP; Oppenheimer, BR. Cool White Dwarfs from the SuperCOSMOS and Sloan Digital Sky Surveys. 14th European Workshop on White Dwarfs. 334:113. July 2005
- Lewis C Roberts Jr, L William Bradford, Mark A Skinner, A Theo, Nils H Turner, Ben R Oppenheimer, Andrew P Digby, Marshall D Perrin. The Effects of Scintillation on Non-Redundant Aperture Masking Interferometry1. The Advanced Maui Optical and Space Surveillance Technologies Conference. 1:98. 2006
