= Ken Ring =

Ken Ring may refer to:

- Ken Ring (rapper) (born 1979), Swedish hip hop rapper
- Ken Ring (writer) (1940–2026), New Zealand weather predictor
- Ken Merckx, (or Ken Ring; born 1964), American actor
- Kenneth Ring (born 1935), psychology professor specialising in near-death experiences
