= Brian Rudman =

New Zealand journalist

Brian C. Rudman is a columnist and regular editorial contributor to The New Zealand Herald, New Zealand's largest daily newspaper. He has his own column, 'Rudman's City', where he mainly focuses on issues relating to Auckland (New Zealand's largest city), its growth, public projects, policies and politicians. He is also active in related events and public discussions.

Rudman's views are often controversial and comparatively blunt. He has been the subject of at least three complaints to the New Zealand Press Council, though none of them were upheld. He has also been accused by Michael Bassett, another known New Zealand columnist as well as politician/political historian, as being one of "the usual left-wing commentators who take their cue from on high" in regard to some comments he made regarding Don Brash.

Rudman supports a New Zealand republic.

== Awards ==
Rudman has been awarded the Charles Southwell Award from the New Zealand Association of Rationalists and Humanists, for "his many years of equitable and informed journalism, often supporting views compatible with the objectives of this Association". In 1999, Rudman was awarded a Bravo award by the New Zealand Skeptics for his "article on May 11th describing the quantum radio frequency booster used as a cancer cure as 'health fraud in its darkest form'".
