= Homeopathy in New Zealand =

Homeopathy practice is unregulated in New Zealand and homeopathic remedies are available at pharmacies, although there are calls to have them removed from sale.

A small-scale survey of homeopathic practitioners of New Zealand in 2008 showed that they all claimed to be able to treat asthma and ear infections, and statements such as "hundreds of remedies for ear infections and asthma" and "homeopaths have a success rate nearing 80%" were made.

Though large scale studies conducted across the world show that homeopathy is a pseudoscience and its remedies have been found to be no more effective than placebo. The New Zealand Medical Association does not oppose the use of alternative medical practices such as homeopathy if it can be shown that the patient can make an informed choice; however, this stance has been called unethical and may be in contravention of medical regulations.

== Belief and scepticism ==
The New Zealand Skeptics organisation took part in the international 10^{23} campaign in 2011. Protests were held in Auckland, Wellington and Christchurch.

A 2012 survey showed that 51% of the New Zealand population had some degree of belief that homeopathic remedies were scientifically proven.

Absolutely certain it's true	4%	Absolutely certain that it is not true	16%
Fairly certain it's true	14%	Fairly certain it is not true	12%
Believe it but not too certain	16%	Believe it's not true but not too certain	8%
Believe it but not at all certain	17%	Believe it's not true but not for certain	13%
	51%		49%

== Organisations ==
The Auckland Homeopathic Hospital, with Carl Fisher as superintendent, operated from 1858 to 1862. For a half-yearly report of 1859 a total of 34 patients out of 55 were claimed to have been cured.

There are a number of training providers that teach homeopathy, and the New Zealand Qualifications Authority issues credits for homeopathy courses.

The New Zealand Council of Homeopaths, formed in 1999, acts as a representative for the industry. It was formed by the amalgamation of New Zealand Homoeopathic Society, the New Zealand Institute of Classical Homeopathy and the New Zealand Accreditation Board of Natural Therapies. Homoeopathica a journal published by the New Zealand Homoeopathic Society.

== Autism Cure Claims ==
In 2019 18 New Zealand based Homeopathic practitioners advertised CEASE therapy as a cure for autism with Helen Petousis-Harris stating "CEASE therapy as a whole new level of homeopathic woo". Autism NZ chief executive Dane Dougan "knows of CEASE therapy but had not heard of it being used much in New Zealand, which he thinks is probably a good thing" and also said "some of the unproven therapies prey on some of the most vulnerable people in society".

== Measles Immunity claims ==
In a measles outbreak in 2016, members of the public presented certificates of homeopathic prophylaxis as evidence of immunity from measles however, randomised studies have proven there is no immunity gained from homeopathic prophylaxis.

== Prosecutions ==
The Commerce Commission, which administers the Fair Trading Act, has prosecuted companies for misleading claims about homeopathic products.

In 1997 SCI Natural (NZ) Ltd was to be prosecuted for claims that the Soft Seaweed Soap product would help people to lose weight. The Commerce Commission decided not to go ahead with the prosecution since a key individual had left New Zealand and the company went into liquidation. A Tauranga-based couple who specialised in homeopathic remedies pleaded guilty to 19 charges under the Fair Trading Act in 2008 for making misleading claims. as they claimed their anti-terror kit could protect or cure anthrax, botulism, smallpox, bird flu, the Sars virus and other conditions.

== Criticism ==
To prove the lack of evidence and efficacy in Homeopathic remedies, in 2010 the NZ Skeptics planned a homeopathic overdose, with President Vicki Hyde stating the remedies "are based on “wishful thinking”" and nothing but “sham and sugar”. As part of a wider global protest across UK, Australia, New Zealand, Canada and the US, the protesters consumed large doses of homeopathic remedies with no reported overdosing or cure to existing conditions.

== See also ==
- Fringe science
- List of topics characterized as pseudoscience
- Evidence and efficacy of homeopathy
- Health care in New Zealand
