= Healthcare in New Zealand =

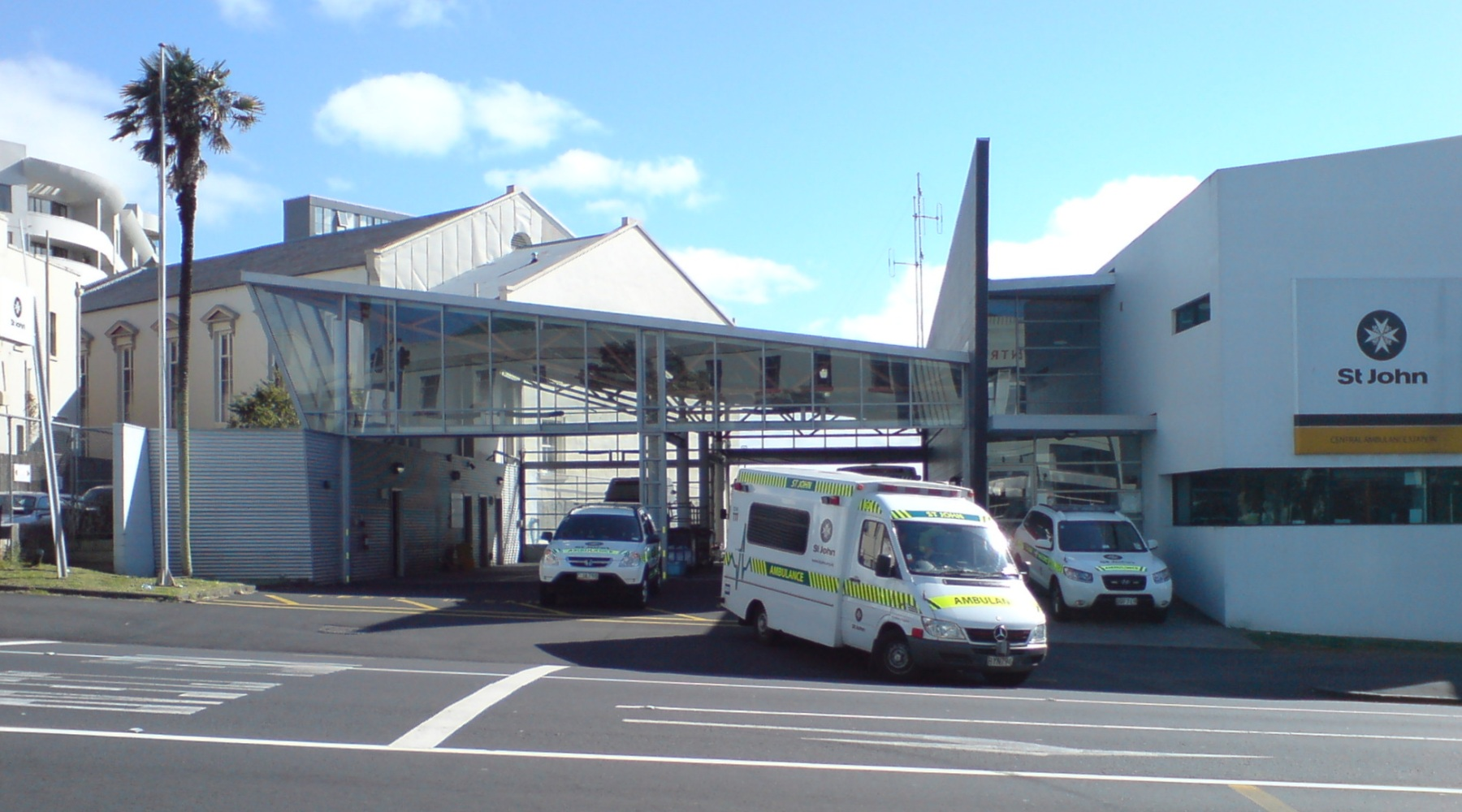
Ambulance vehicles of Hato Hone St John at their Pitt Street, Auckland, base

The healthcare system of New Zealand has undergone significant changes throughout the past several decades. From an essentially fully public system based on the Social Security Act 1938, reforms have introduced market and health insurance elements, primarily since the 1980s, creating a mixed public-private system for delivering healthcare.

- The Accident Compensation Corporation covers the costs of treatment for cases deemed 'accidents', including medical misadventure, for all people in New Zealand (legally or otherwise). The costs are recovered via levies on employers, employees, petrol and vehicle registration, and contributions from the general tax pool.
- The relatively extensive and high-quality system of public hospitals treats citizens or permanent residents free of charge and is managed by district health boards. However, costly or difficult operations often require long waiting list delays unless the treatment is medically urgent. Because of this, a secondary market of health insurance organisations exists which fund operations and treatments for their members privately. Southern Cross Health Insurance, a non-profit organisation, is the largest of these at about 60% of the health insurance market and covering almost a quarter of all New Zealanders in 2007, even operating its own chain of hospitals.
- Primary care (non-specialist doctors / family doctors) and medications on the list of the New Zealand government agency Pharmac require co-payments, but are subsidised, especially for patients with community health services cards or high user health cards.
- Emergency services are primarily provided by Hato Hone St John charity (as well as Wellington Free Ambulance in the Wellington Region), supported with a mix of private (donated) and public (subsidy) funds.
- New Zealand has one of the highest nurse turnover rates. Not all nurses leave the profession but rather continuously switch organisations. Not all the impact of nurses leaving is negative, but when it is it can cause reduced continuity of care, disruption of services, and a drop in overall productivity.

In 2012, New Zealand spent 8.7% of GDP on healthcare, or US$3,929 per capita. Of that, approximately 77% was government expenditure. In a 2010 study, New Zealand was shown to have the lowest level of medication use in 14 developed countries (i.e. used least medicines overall), and also spent the lowest amount on healthcare amongst the same list of countries, with US$2510 ($3460) per capita, compared to the United States at US$7290.

== History of healthcare ==
Until well after European contact Māori used natural medicines and spiritual healing. Among the European settlers, professional medical care was expensive and most people diagnosed themselves or sought alternative treatment. In the mid 19th century New Zealand's first public hospitals were created by Governor George Grey and were available for those who could not afford a private doctor.

The Public Health Act 1872 introduced local authority health boards. These were funded primarily by the local ratepayers and subsidised by the central government. There was still a large reliance on private charity to make up any shortfall. From 1909 poorer districts were given disproportionately more funding from the central government. In 1938, the Social Security Act from the First Labour Government attempted to provide government funded healthcare to all. A free health system, with hospital and other health services universally available to all New Zealanders was the vision behind the Social Security Act 1938. This was never fully realised due to ongoing disputes between the medical profession and the Government. Health services evolved as a dual system of public and private health care subsidised through a series of arrangements known as the General Medical Service (GMS) benefits established in 1941. This remained largely unchanged until the late 1970s. From 1984 to 1993 the Labour then National governments introduced major changes designed to get area health boards (later Crown health enterprises) to imitate market forces. In terms of dental care, dental health services were made free for children up to the age of 16. For adults, by the late 1960s (as noted by one study) "Public hospitals may provide outpatient dental treatment under certain limited circumstances and reduce or waive the charges if the financial circumstances are such that the payment should be reduced or waived. By the early 1970s, the Social Security Department provided (as noted by one study) “supplementary assistance to those who cannot meet the costs of necessary dental treatment” while some public hospitals provided free dental treatment to those in need. Help with medical costs was provided from supplementary assistance; a form of social assistance. Amongst such costs that supplementary assistance helped with included doctor’s consultation fees. As noted by one study from 1969

A form of means test now operates in respect of the once free social security medical benefit, in that unless doctors charge reduced fees to patients who they think could not afford to pay full fees, patients are often required to pay about two-thirds of the average cost of the doctor’s consultation fees, and, although such payments are taken into account as commitments when assessing supplementary assistance, the supplementary assistance is subject to an income and property test.

User charges were introduced for prescriptions in February 1985 but broader controversial policies introduced by the Fourth National Government between 1991 and 1993 effectively ended largely free provision of primary healthcare, such services being targeted on the basis of income while Community Service Cards (introduced on 1 February 1992) provided additional support. Public hospital charges of $50 for overnight stays were briefly implemented but was later abandoned as the 1993 election approached.

New Zealand has had numerous public health campaigns and initiatives. Children were given free milk between 1937 and 1967 but these were abolished due to budgetary constraints, fluoride is added to most drinking water in the country and there have been many anti-drinking (from the 1870s) and anti-smoking campaigns (from the 1960s).

=== Restructuring of the healthcare system ===
On 21 April 2021, Health Minister Andrew Little announced a plan to centralise healthcare, abolishing all 20 District Health Boards and creating a single health organisation called Health New Zealand, in a plan to centralise New Zealand's fragmented healthcare system and end what has been characterised as a "postcode lottery" of care. Health New Zealand would be modelled after the United Kingdom's National Health Service. The Ministry of Health also created a Māori Health Authority with spending power, and a new Public Health Authority to centralise public health work.

In October 2021, the Sixth Labour Government introduced the Pae Ora (Healthy Futures) Bill to replace the country's district health boards with the new Health NZ. The legislation also formally establishes the Māori Health Authority and a new public health agency. The Ministry of Health will also play a stewardship role within the reformed health system. The bill passed its third reading on 7 June 2022.

A 2026 study of comparative health systems in conducted by Harvard School of Public Health and the World Health Organization found that these 2021 - 2022 health reforms were in part aided by national strategies to navigate political economy dynamics, pre-empt public pushback, and encourage the sticking-power of these reforms. These included political endorsement across centralized and local government, leveraging low-veto political environments to move reforms forward, and demonstrating the effectiveness of new multidisciplinary team models before implementation.

== Structure ==
At present, the Ministry of Health is responsible for the oversight and funding of the twenty district health boards (DHBs). These are responsible for organising healthcare in the district and meeting the standards set by the Ministry of Health. Twenty-one DHBs came into being on 1 January 2001 with Southland and Otago DHBs merging into Southern DHB on 1 May 2010.

The boards for each district health board are elected in elections held every three years, with the exception of one of the eight board members, who is appointed by the Ministry of Health.

The DHBs oversee the forty-six primary health organisations established throughout the country. These were first set up in July 2002, with a mandate to focus on the health of communities. Originally there were 81 of these, but this has been reduced down to 46 in 2008. They are funded by DHBs, and are required to be entirely non-profit, democratic bodies that are responsive to their communities' needs. Almost all New Zealanders are enrolled in a PHO, as there are financial incentives for the patients to become enrolled.

The Northern Region DHBs also use shared services provided by the Northern DHB Support Agency and HealthAlliance. These services deliver region-wide health initiatives and shared IT services and logistics.

In Christchurch, the Canterbury District Health Board has been successful in redesigning services to reduce hospital use. Some of this transformation was precipitated by the 2010 and 2011 earthquakes when several healthcare buildings were damaged or destroyed, and also 2019 mosque massacre as the several healthcare also response to the terrorist attacks. It now has lower rates of acute medical admissions, low average lengths of stay, fewer readmissions in acute care, fewer cancelled planned admissions and more conditions treated out of hospital.

== Public vs. private payment ==
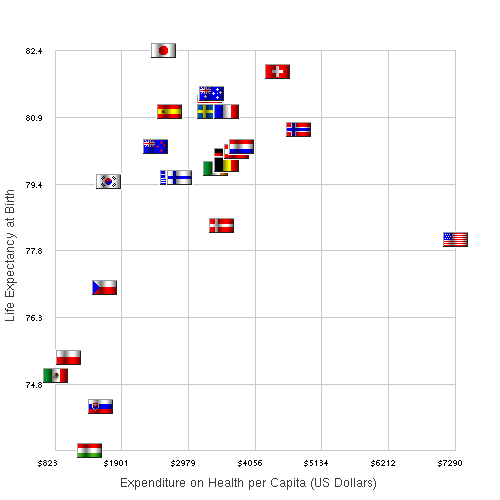
Healthcare spending vs life expectancy for some countries in 2007

Hospital and specialist care in New Zealand is totally covered by the government if the patient is referred by a general or family practitioner and this is funded from government expenditure (approx. 77%). Private payment by individuals also plays an important role in the overall system although the cost of these payments are comparatively minor. Those earning less than certain amounts, depending on the number of dependents in their household, can qualify for a Community Services Card (CSC). This reduces the cost of after-hours doctors' visits, and prescription fees, as well as the cost of visits to a person's regular doctor.

Injuries which occur as a result of "accidents", ranging from minor to major physical but including psychological trauma from sexual abuse are generally covered by the Accident Compensation Corporation (ACC). This may include coverage for doctors visits and lump-sum payments.

=== Waiting lists ===
In New Zealand's public health system it is typical for medical appointments, particularly surgeries to have a waiting list. District Health Boards are typical judged in the media and by government in part based on the length of these lists. In 2016, it was inferred that many people required surgery but were not put on the official list. Research projected that of all the people who had been told they needed surgery less than half were on the official list. However, the main concern noted by health industry observers was the overall increase in waiting time, about 304 days.

=== Telehealth ===
In 2018 the Northern Region district health boards, Northland, Waitemata, Auckland and Counties Manukau developed a telehealth system with a unified video, audio, content sharing and chat platform provided by Zoom Video Communications which is intended to lead to a more integrated health system in the Northern Region. This should enable real-time consultations between clinicians in hospital, primary care and the community, and between patients and their care providers.

=== Healthcare organisations ===
The list of well-known Healthcare organisations in New Zealand are: – Geneva Healthcare – Counties Manukau Homecare Trust – Healthcare of New Zealand Holdings Ltd – Healthvision – Life Plus Ltd – Healthcare NZ – Royal District Nursing Service New Zealand

=== Hearing services ===
New Zealand residents with hearing loss may be eligible for publicly funded support through the Ministry of Health. The Hearing Aid Subsidy Scheme provides NZ$1,022.22 toward the cost of hearing aids for eligible adults, while full funding is available for children and individuals with complex needs under the Hearing Aid Funding Scheme.

In addition to traditional fee-for-service models, some private audiology providers, such as New Zealand owned Resonate Health, have adopted subscription-based pricing, which includes the hearing devices, ongoing care, batteries, and servicing in a monthly fee. This approach aims to improve affordability and access to long-term hearing care.

== Abortion ==
Abortion is legal upon request in New Zealand. According to figures released by Statistics New Zealand, the number of abortions rose from 8.5 per 1,000 women aged 15‒44 years in 1980 to 14 per 1,000 women in 1990. By 2000, this figure had risen to 18.7 per 1,000 women aged 15‒44 years but has since declined to 13.5 per 1,000 women as of 2018.

== Medications ==
The Pharmaceutical Management Agency of New Zealand (PHARMAC) was set up in 1993 to decide which medications the government will subsidise. In general, PHARMAC will select an effective and safe medication from a class of drugs, and negotiate with the drug manufacturer to obtain the best price. There are approximately 2,000 drugs listed on the national schedule that are either fully or partially subsidised.

In a sample of 13 developed countries New Zealand was thirteenth in its population weighted usage of medication in 14 classes in 2009 and also in 2013. The drugs studied were selected on the basis that the conditions treated had high incidence, prevalence and/or mortality, caused significant long-term morbidity and incurred high levels of expenditure and significant developments in prevention or treatment had been made in the last 10 years. The study noted considerable difficulties in cross border comparison of medication use.

Sildenafil was reclassified in New Zealand in 2014 so it could be bought over the counter from a pharmacist. It is thought that this reduced sales over the Internet and was safer as men could be referred for medical advice if appropriate.

== Emergency service ==
Most emergency and non-urgent ambulance transportation is carried out by the charitable organisation Hato Hone St John. In Wairarapa and the Wellington Region ambulance services are provided by the Wellington Free Ambulance organisation. The Royal New Zealand College of Urgent Care (RNZCUC) overseas Emergency Service practitioners in New Zealand.

=== Performance ===
An investigation into the death of a patient in the emergency department at Middlemore Hospital on 15 June 2022 concluded that the department was unsafe for both patients and its staff. On that night it was at least 30% over-capacity – but this was “…not an isolated day.” Nor was it unusual. The report said "As emergency departments continue to struggle with ever-increasing presentation numbers, delays in admitting patients to wards and significant ED overcrowding, announcements in ED waiting rooms regarding delays in assessment/treatment occur at an increasing frequency throughout EDs in Aotearoa New Zealand." Margie Apa of Te Whatu Ora accepted the conclusions of the report.

== See also ==
- Euthanasia in New Zealand
- Health in New Zealand
- Homeopathy in New Zealand
- List of hospitals in New Zealand
- List of New Zealand doctors
- Mental health in New Zealand
