= Community Services Card =

New Zealand identity document

The Community Services Card is a credit card-sized plastic document issued to New Zealanders earning low incomes or state benefits to verify their eligibility to discounts on various community services, including healthcare, education and public transport.
