= NZ Skeptics =

Organisation to promote critical thinking

- Formation: 1986; 40 years ago
- Founders: Bernard Howard, David Marks, Denis Dutton, Gordon Hewitt, Jim Woolnough, Kerry Chamberlain, Ray Carr
- Type: Nonprofit organisation
- Legal status: Incorporated Society, Registered Charity
- Location: New Zealand
- Chairperson: Bronwyn Rideout
- Main organ: Committee
- Website: skeptics.nz
- Formerly called: New Zealand Committee for Scientific Investigation of Claims of the Paranormal

NZ Skeptics is a New Zealand incorporated society created in 1986, with the aim of promoting critical thinking. The main areas of interest to the NZ Skeptics are claims of psychic abilities, alternative medicine, creationism and other pseudoscientific claims. At its founding in 1986, it was known as the New Zealand Committee for the Scientific Investigation of Claims of the Paranormal (NZCSICOP). In 2007 the name was formally changed to NZ Skeptics Incorporated.

== History ==
NZ Skeptics was co-founded (as the New Zealand Committee for the Scientific Investigation of Claims of the Paranormal) by David Marks, Denis Dutton, Bernard Howard, Gordon Hewitt, Jim Woolnough, Ray Carr and Kerry Chamberlain in 1986. Other similar organisations exist in the USA (Committee for Skeptical Inquiry), Australia (Australian Skeptics) and India (Indian CSICOP). Denis Dutton was the first chair. Vicki Hyde took over as the first chair-entity (a title devised by Hugh Young both to be all-inclusive and to parody inclusiveness) from 1997 to 2010. Gold (his only name), who founded the New Zealand Skeptics in the Pub, was chair-entity from 2010 to 2014. Mark Honeychurch was chairperson between 2014 and 2017. As of 2024, Bronwyn Rideout is the current chairperson. Vicki Hyde continues in the society as a media spokesperson. The English spelling of the word "skeptic" was chosen over the British spelling "sceptic" to more closely associate with the American organisation, and to avoid negative connotations of "being cynical and negative". In 2007 the committee decided to formally change the name to NZ Skeptics Incorporated (NZSI).

The society does not address the topic of religion, not only because there are other organisations better equipped to deal with it, but also because religion is not testable unless the supporter makes a specific claim. The founders felt that people with religious beliefs could also be skeptical of claims of the paranormal and did not want to exclude them.

Due to a concern that the word "skeptic" was being confused by the public and media with respect to climate change NZSI made the following statement in 2014:

The New Zealand Skeptics Society supports the scientific consensus on Climate Change. There is an abundance of evidence demonstrating global mean temperatures are rising, and that humans have had a considerable impact on the natural rate of change. The Society will adjust its position with the scientific consensus.

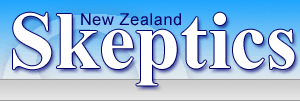
Logo of the NZ Skeptics used until 2015

Shortly after its inception in 1986, the society produced a quarterly journal, The New Zealand Skeptic, which they sent out to all members. In 2015 NZSI adopted a logo that incorporates a kiwi, koru and a question mark, and released a new website and journal. The website was updated in 2020, and around that time the journal was discontinued and replaced by an emailed newsletter and a fortnightly podcast (the Yeah... Nah! podcast).

In 1989 after its first conference NZSI had 80 members; by 1999 there were over 500 members. Some notable skeptics such as James Randi, Richard Dawkins, Susan Blackmore, Ian Plimer and John Maddox had visited in that time.

When people ask me who the Skeptics are, I reply "We're the guys that say the Emperor's not wearing any clothes and how come no-one else has noticed".

— Vicki Hyde 1995

== Activities ==
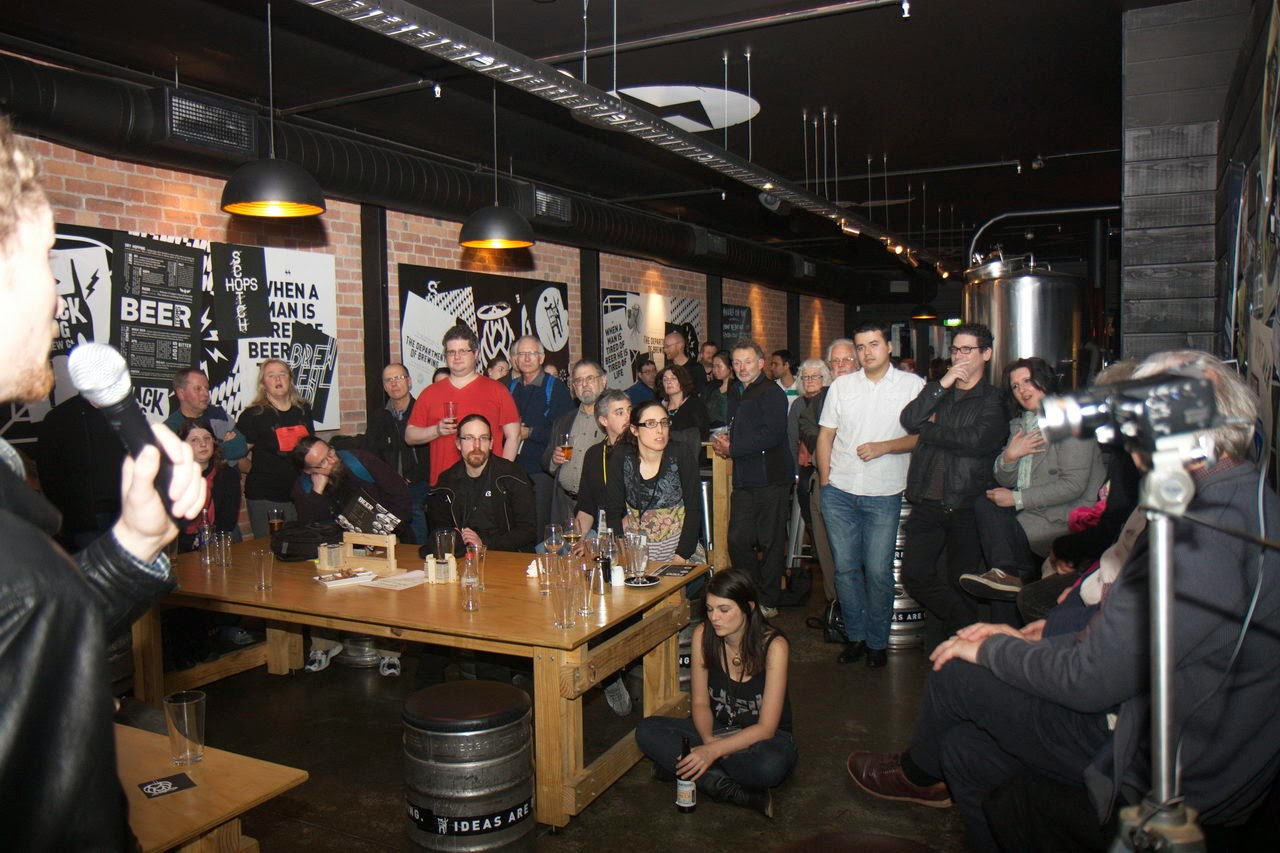
SkeptiCamp Wellington – 2013

NZ Skeptics holds an annual conference during the New Zealand summer. Conferences generally alternate between the three major New Zealand cities of Auckland, Wellington and Christchurch, with other cities hosting as and when there is sufficient interest.

On 30 January 2010, members in Christchurch participated in a mass overdose, a protest against the selling of homeopathic remedies in pharmacies. The protest was in line with similar activities held on the same day by the 10:23 campaign in the UK.

The first New Zealand SkeptiCamp was held at the Black Dog Brewery in Wellington.

Skeptics in the Pub events are held throughout New Zealand in Auckland, Hamilton, Palmerston North, Wellington, Christchurch and Dunedin.

== Sue Nicholson ==
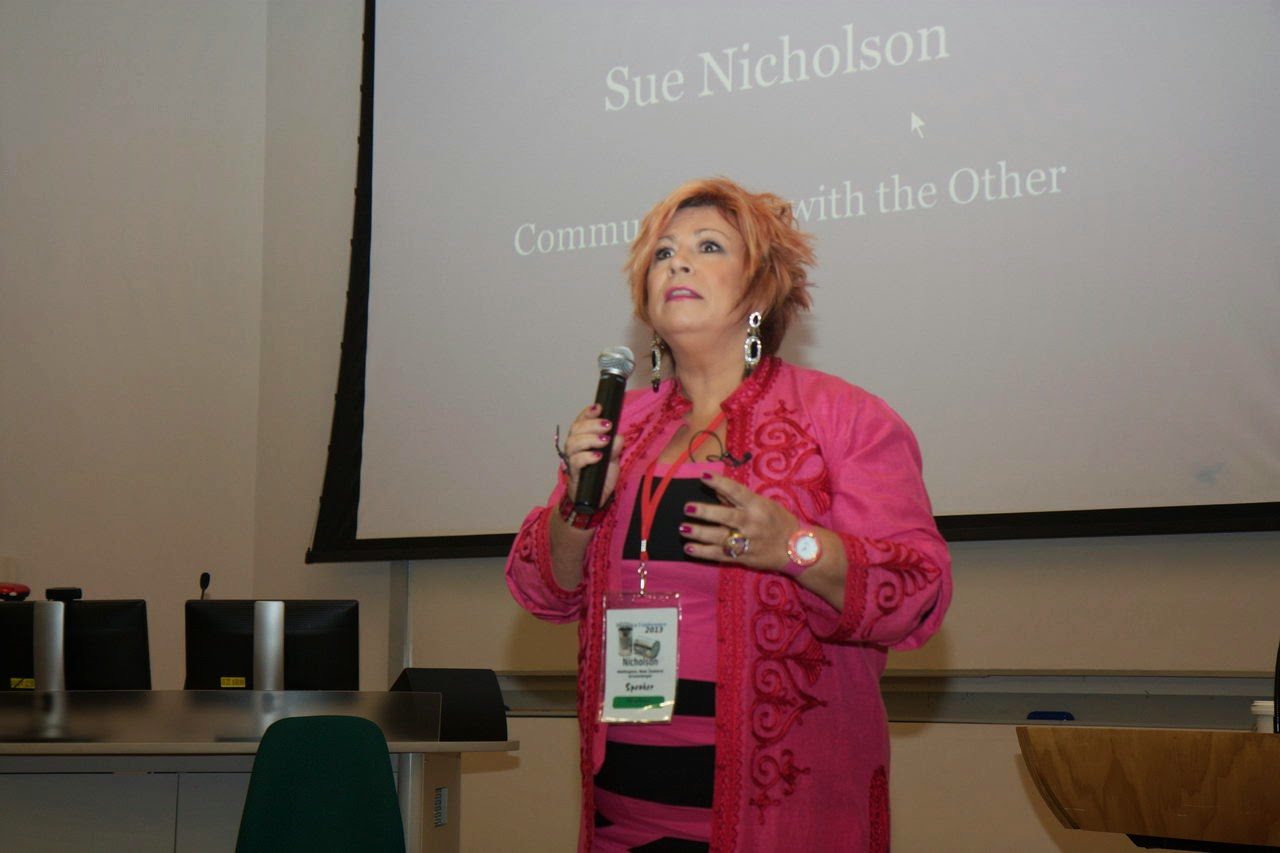
"Psychic medium" Sue Nicholson at 2013 conference

Sensing Murder psychic Sue Nicholson spoke at the 2013 Wellington conference about her 21 years of experiences as a psychic medium. Organiser Vicki Hyde applauded Nicholson's willingness to speak at the conference, saying "many people working in this profession are very reluctant to expose themselves to any critical scrutiny." Hyde is quick to add that "critical" in this case "involves a spirit of genuine interest and inquiry", even if proof of spirits from the after-life continues to be elusive.

Nicholson talked about her life history as a psychic for 18 minutes and opened up the lecture for questions. Despite being skeptical, the audience remained respectful and questioning.

Nicholson stated that her friends told her not to attend the conference, but she said, "I believe in healthy discussion, and we all have our opinions and that's great. I'm not here to prove anything. I'm not here to convince you. We all have our thoughts, we all have our ideas and that's how the world goes around."

3 News attended Nicholson's lecture and wrote, "But despite a colourful performance from Ms Nicholson, this lot remains unconvinced." Nicholson agreed to talk at the conference with the stipulation that the $500 speakers fee would be donated to a Women's Refuge."

The organisation has remained critical of psychics such as Nicholson. In 2018, NZ Skeptics denounced those who claim they can help locate missing persons, contacting families with information. Referring to one such case, NZ Skeptics Society chair Craig Shearer insisted those "grief vampires" never actually helped police solve a disappearance.

== Legal action ==
In 1988 NZCSICOP member Trevor Reeves wrote a series of letters about psychic Shona Saxon and sent them to the editor of the Dunedin Star Midweek paper, to the Citizens Advice service, to the Dunedin police, and to social welfare. Saxon sued Reeves for malice, claiming embarrassment, humiliation and loss. According to Saxon, Reeves stated that she was "misleading people", "persuading people to go off their prescribed medications" and "upsetting disturbed people... on welfare benefits". The high court judge ruled in favour of Saxon. "[e]ssentially because he did not believe that Ms Saxon had deliberately set out to deceive clients". The judge held that Reeves' "statements were actuated by malice... by gratuitously attack[ing] Ms Saxon's personal integrity." Saxon was awarded a total of $12,000 damages, $6,000 against Reeves and $6,000 against Allied Press Ltd. Reeves appealed to the High Court and the damages awarded against him were reduced to $4,500.

Because of the way the NZCSICOP public statements were worded, they were not a party to this action, and escaped what could have been a crippling penalty. The constitution provides suspension or expulsion of any member who brings the society into disrepute. Reeves left NZCSICOP shortly after the judgment was made. The case is recorded as Saxon v Reeves High Court Dunedin A39/87.

== Dowsing ==
NZ Skeptics has been vocal in the fight against the government use of the pseudoscience of dowsing in New Zealand. The Carterton District Council uses dowsing to find underground pipes and cables despite the NZ Skeptics evidence that dowsing has been discredited. The Wellington City Council paid the Downer Group to use dowsing to find buried water pipes in early 2019. The City Council and a Downer Group representative both stated they were satisfied their work despite complaints by the NZ Skeptics. The Wellington City Council and the Downer Group were co-awarded the Bent Spoon Award for 2019.

== Conferences ==
The annual NZ Skeptics Conference hosts a wide range of local and international speakers. The location usually alternates between Auckland, Wellington, Christchurch, Dunedin and Hamilton, but has also been held in Rotorua and Queenstown. In 2019, the conference was held at the Christchurch Arts Centre / Te Matatiki Toi Ora from 29 November to 1 December.

International guests have raised New Zealand's general awareness of skepticism. In July 1993 James Randi toured New Zealand, visiting Christchurch, Auckland and Wellington. "However, those unable to see him in person had plenty of opportunity to see him on TV, hear him on radio and read about him in newspapers and magazines. He was tireless in submitting himself to the punishing round of interviews, etc, arranged by our enthusiastic Media Representative. Every interviewer wanted to see him bend spoons, and he left behind him a trail of bent and broken cutlery, the bill for which was not negligible."

George Hrab travelled to the North Island on 1 December 2014, stopping over in Wellington for a special skeptics dinner event. Seating was limited to twelve, and tickets were auctioned in a blind auction on the NZ skeptic website.

List of Conferences
| Dates | Location | Speakers | Themes and notes |
|---|---|---|---|
| 8–10 August 1986 | Dunedin | "What is Pseudoscience?" and "Psychics, Clairvoyants and Cold Reading" by Denis Dutton, "Creationism and the Misuse of Biology" by Gordon Hewitt, "The Australia-New Zealand Stop-over for International Psychics" by Mark Plummer (Founding Chairman, Australian Skeptics), "Psychics I Have Known" by David Marks | First conference held at the University of Otago. Registration $5–$10. |
| 1989 | Christchurch | | Firewalking held |
| 1992 | Wellington | "UFO update" by Felke de Bock, "E-Meter" by Eric Geiringer, "The Placebo Effect" by Bill Morris | |
| 3–5 September 1993 | Christchurch | "Police Use of Psychics" by detective Ian Holyoake, "Naturally Skeptical" by Margaret Mahy, "Satanic Panics" by Michael Hill, "Maori Science" by Mike Dickison, "The Manna Machine" by Feike de Bock | Membership moves to over 300 persons. |
| 1994 | unknown | Dave Wilson, "Grand Interplanetary Hoax of 1952" by John Scott | |
| 1995 | Auckland | "Active Skepticism" by Vicki Hyde, "Pseudo-medicine" by John Scott | |
| 1996 | Hamilton | Malcolm Carr, Big Muffin Serious Band | Held at the Chanel Conference Centre |
| 1997 | | Vicki Hyde, "Political Correctness at the Supermarket" by Jay Mann, Denis Dutton, Mike Bradstock, Alan Clarke, David Novitz, Debra Nation, George Balani | |
| 1998 | Wellington | "Satan's Excellent Adventure in the Antipodes" by Michael Hill, "Can Sharks Save the Human Race?" by Paul Davis, "Real Memories of False Facts" by Maryanne Garry | John Welch opened conference with "do-it-yourself acupuncture". Conference attendees over 140. |
| 1999 | Auckland | "Hedgehogs, Counselling and the End of the World" by Annette Taylor, "The Danger of Absolute Safety" by Felicity Goodyear-Smith, "The Global Messenger Hoax And The Misinformation Economy" by John Scott, "Reading Cats’ Paws" by Ken Ring, "Philosophical Skepticism Based on the Work of David Hume" by James Allen | "You Are Not Alone" Conference title "From ERA to EAV, the Sorry Saga of the Black Box" by David Cole |
| 2000 | Dunedin | Ian Plimer, David Marks, Bill Peddie, Barbara Benson, Warwick Don, "Kaikoura UFOs" by Bill Ireland, Richard Mullen | Theme Evolution, Creationism and Education |
| 21–23 September 2001 | Hamilton | Bernard Howard, "Gulf War Syndrome" by John Welch, Nick Kim, Mike Clear, Raymond Richards, Doug Edmeades | Held at the Waikato Diocesan School for Girls |
| 13–15 September 2002 | Christchurch | "How To Stop a Witch-Hunt" by Lynley Hood | Held at St. Andrews College |
| 19–21 September 2003 | Wellington | "Science and Environmental Policy – Challenges and Opportunities" by Bruce Taylor | Held at the Victoria University |
| 10–12 September 2004 | Christchurch | "The Mesmerisation of the Media" by David Mcloughlin, "Why are we crying into our beer?" by Owen McShane | Held at St. Andrews College |
| 30 September – 2 October 2005 | Rotorua | "Skeptics and the environment" by Keith Garratt, Raymond Bradley, "Maria Duval scam" by Martin Craig, Harry Pert, Kinsley Logan, John Petrie, Hamish Campbell | Held at the Millennium Centre, Rotorua Boys High School |
| 29 September – 1 October 2006 | Auckland | Jonathan McKeown-Green, Te Radar, Grant Christie, Judith Goodyear | Held at King's College; 20th Anniversary Celebration |
| 21–23 September 2007 | Christchurch | Michael Woolf, Geoff Diggs, Mark Orton | Held at St. Andrews College |
| 26–28 September 2008 | Hamilton | Matthew Dentith, Nikos Petousis, Felicity Goodyear-Smith, Alison Campbell, Nathan Grange, Kamya Kameshwar, Zachary Gravatt, Martin Wallace, Glynn Owens, Vincent Gray, Lisa Matisso-Smith | Held at Waikato Diocesan College |
| 25–27 September 2009 | Wellington | Bernard Beckett, Matthew Dentith, John Robinson | Documentary Poisoning Paradise: Ecocide in New Zealand was shown and dissected by the Skeptics as a "political push to stop 1080 poisoning that isn't based on sound scientific facts." |
| 13–15 August 2010 | Auckland | Mental magic by Wayne Rogers | Firewalk on Friday the 13th, conference registration $60–80. |
| 26–28 August 2011 | Christchurch | Mark Quigley, Kylie Sturgess, Michael Edmonds, Martin Bridgstock, Mark Ottley | 150 in attendance |
| 31 August – 2 September 2012 | Dunedin | Michael Edmonds, Nick Barbalich, David Winter, Richard Walter, Ewan Fordyce, Andrew Scott, Colin Gavaghan, Jean Fleming, Mark Ottley, Dave Veart | Held at Otago University |
| 6–8 September 2013 | Wellington | Kylie Sturgess, Siouxsie Wiles, Martin Manning, Matt McCrudden, Pamela Gay, Aimee Whitcroft, David Bulger, Elf Eldridge, Sue Nicholson, Vicki Hyde, Peter Griffin, Loretta Marron | Keynote Pamela Gay Free conference registration for anyone using psychic powers revealing contents of a sealed envelope. |
| 5–7 December 2014 | Auckland | George Hrab, Steven Novella, Rebecca Watson, Jay Novella, Bob Novella, Evan Bernstein, Helen Petousis-Harris, Steven Galbraith, Nicola Gaston, Michelle Dickinson, Toby Ricketts, Ben Albert, Ngaire McCarthy, Siouxsie Wiles, Vicki Hyde, Karen Toast Conger, Darcy Cowan, Mark Hanna | Pricing $195–155, live recording of the SGU podcast. SGU quiz show on Friday night run by George Hrab. |
| 20–22 November 2015 | Christchurch | Siouxsie Wiles, Kim Socha, Mike Joy, Karl Haro von Mogel, Shaun Holt, Colin Gavaghan, Grant Jacobs, Douglas Campbell, Karen Healey, Vicki Hyde, The Nerd Degree podcast | Called "Apocalypse How?" |
| 2–4 December 2016 | Queenstown | Richard Saunders, Loretta Marron, Susan Gerbic, Andrew Digby, Mark Hanna, Tania Lineham, Catherine Low, Mark Bryan, Scott Kennedy | |
| 24–26 November 2017 | Wellington | Cara Santa Maria, Joseph Bulbulia, Haritina Mogosanu, Tracey McDermott, Ken McLeod, Kevin Hague, Dr Alison Campbell, Dr Vanessa Jordan, Dr Jonathan Broadbent, Vinny Eastwood | Theme – Get Thee To The Nunnery! |
| 16–18 November 2018 | Auckland | Ian Bryce, Russell Brown, Professor Kathleen Campbell, Dr Gavin Ellis, Associate Professor Jennifer Frost, Dacia Herbulock, Dr. Daniel Hikuroa, Dr Justine Kingsbury, Dr Nick Kim, Kathleen Kuehn, Dr. Alex Taylor, Dr. Simon Connell | Venue – Butterfly Creek |
| 30–1 November December, 2019 | Christchurch | The Skeptics' Guide to the Universe, Steven Novella, Susan Gerbic, Cara Santa Maria, Professor David Wiltshire, Jacinta Cording, Professor Maree Hackett, Mark Edward | Main venue – The Great Hall, in the Christchurch Arts Centre and pre-conference gathering at a reputed haunted house |
| 24–26 November, 2023 | Dunedin | Susan Gerbic, Anke Richter, Melanie Trecek-King, Greg Dawes, Frank Kueppers, Lynley Hood, Zafir Ivanov, David Hood. | The conference was held at Toitū Otago Settlers Museum. The speakers included an acupuncturist listed as a "mystery guest" who, in answer to a question after his presentation, said that he didn't like "being grouped with pseudoscience". One reviewer expressed their opinion that there is value in those practicing alternative medicine and skeptics having "polite and calm conversations about difficult subjects". |
| 15-17, November 2024 | Auckland | Craig Hoyle, Gavin Ellis, MacGregor-Reid, Michael Bankcroft, Natasha McKean, Niki Harre, Patsy Spicer, Robert Bartholomew, Stephane Janson, Tim Welch | This joint conference of NZ Skeptics and the New Zealand Association of Rationalists and Humanists (NZARH) was held at the Fickling Convention Centre. |

== Awards ==
A number of awards are presented at the annual conference dinner, notably the 'Bravo Award' for "critical thinking in the public arena", the 'Bent Spoon Award' for "the most gullible or naive reporting in the paranormal or pseudo-science area" and the 'Skeptic of the Year Award' (created in 2014). The name "Bent Spoon" is a reference to the psychic power claimed by Uri Geller.

=== Denis Dutton Skeptic of the Year Award ===
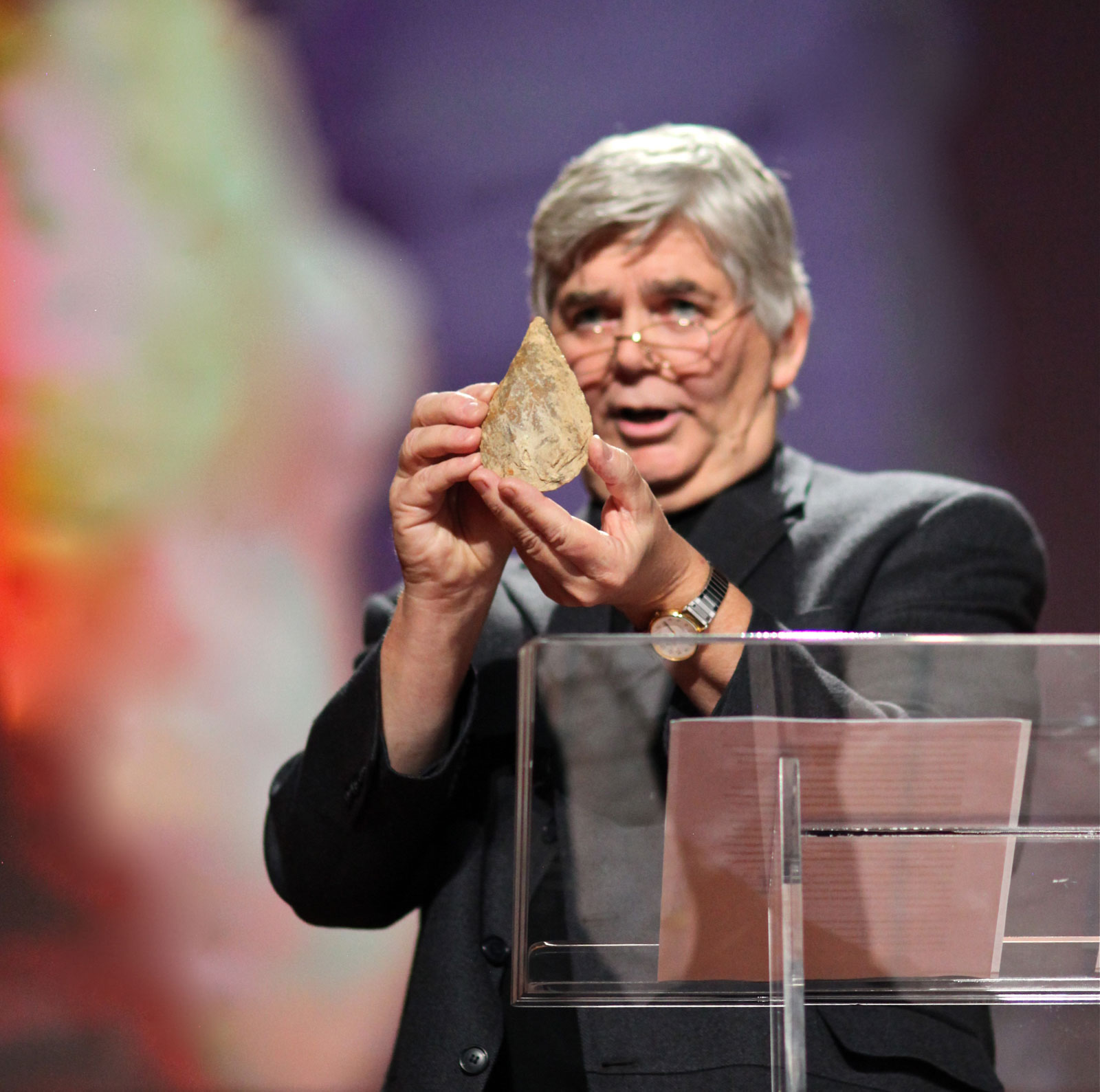
Denis Dutton 2010

A founder of New Zealand Skeptics, Denis Dutton was a "thought-provoking, good-humoured and inspirational critical thinker" who the group decided to honour with a yearly prize... "to the skeptic who has had the most impact within New Zealand skepticism. The award comes with a year's free membership to NZ Skeptics and $100 prize money." Other former recipients have included: Mark Hanna, Daniel Ryan, Siouxsie Wiles, Helen Petousis-Harris, Lance O’Sullivan, and Jessica Macfarlane.

Denis Dutton Skeptic of the Year Award details
| Year | Recipient | Reason |
|---|---|---|
| 2014 | Mark Hanna | For tirelessly battling pseudoscience via the ASA, MedSafe and many other means, and for creating the Society for Science Based Healthcare. |
| 2015 | Daniel Ryan | For his work as President of Making Sense Fluoride, including giving a presentation to Hutt City Council – as well as his efforts helping to run the Society for Science Based Healthcare, NZ Skeptics and the Skeptical Activism group in Wellington |
| 2016 | Siouxsie Wiles | For her continued efforts to bring skepticism to the media. This year alone she's taken on MPs, anti-vaxxers and Mike Hosking, tackled topics such as e-cigarettes and the zika virus, and appeared in her regular radio slot "Skeptical Thoughts" with Graeme Hill on RadioLive. |
| 2017 | Helen Petousis-Harris and Lance O’Sullivan | For their courageous and highly visible contributions to the promotion of immunisation and vaccination in New Zealand. |
| 2018 | Jessica Macfarlane | For her tireless efforts as editor of the NZ Skeptics quarterly journal |
| 2019 | No individual winner | No individual winner |
| 2022 | David Farrier | For his journalistic work in exposing the abusive behaviour and practices of Arise Church's leadership as well as serious issues with other religious organisarions including City Impact Church, Bethlehem College, and Hillsong. |
| 2024 | Anke Richter | For ensuring people are informed about cults and that those who leave them are well supported, in particular her work in organising and running the Decult conference held in Christchurch earlier this year. |

=== Bravo Award ===
New Zealand Skeptics recognises "media professionals and those with a high public profile who have provided food for thought, critical analysis and important information on topics of relevance to our interests." According to co-founder Bernard Howard, the Bravo award was meant to be a "carrot" to journalists to reward and encourage good critical thinking in their reporting.

Bravo Award details
| Year | Recipient | Organisation | Reason |
|---|---|---|---|
| 1995 | Kim Hill, Maryanne Ahern, Heather Church | National Radio | Kaimanawa Wall critical coverage |
| 1995 | Simon Collins | City Voice | 21 March 1995 article on the "Tabaash phenomenon", an investigation into a Wellington channeller |
| 1995 | David McLoughlin | | Christchurch Civic Creche case TV documentary |
| 1995 | Mark McNeill | First Hand Productions | TV documentary on false memory syndrome |
| 1996 | TVNZ Assignment | | For the shows The Doctor Who Cried Abuse and Ellis Through the Looking Glass |
| 1996 | Vincent Heeringa | Metro Magazine | Weird Science and Suppressed Inventions and other Discoveries |
| 1996 | Noel O'Hare | New Zealand Listener | For False Memory Syndrome |
| 1997 | Simon Sheppard | The Sunday Star-Times | Apocalypse Soon |
| 1997 | Jan Sinclair | The Sunday Star-Times | Loving the Aliens |
| 1997 | TVNZ's Fair Go | | Psychics who give "lucky lotto numbers" |
| 1998 | Nick Smith | | For working against psychics in the Olivia Hope and Ben Smart disappearance |
| 1998 | Angela Gregory | Northern Advocate | "0900 psychic hotlines" |
| 1998 | Noel O'Hare | New Zealand Listener | Health columnist |
| 1998 | Greenstone TV | | The Mighty Moa |
| 1999 | Roderick Mulgan | Grace | Wellness column in Grace |
| 1999 | Pamela Stirling | New Zealand Listener | Article on Quantum Booster and on Cellasene |
| 1999 | Brian Rudman | The New Zealand Herald | Article on quantum radio frequency booster |
| 2000 | Michelle Hollis | consumer | Article on how to assess medical claims |
| 2000 | New Zealand Association of Rationalists & Humanists | | For work with Ellen Greve "Jasmuheen" |
| 2000 | Kim Hill | National Radio | Interview of John Read |
| 2000 | Matt Philp | New Zealand Listener | God's Classroom |
| 2001 | Susan Wood | | Fiordland moose interview |
| 2001 | T.W. Walker | Christchurch Press | Gardening column |
| 2001 | Denise Tutaki | Horowhenua-Kapiti Chronicle | Calling 0900 Psychic… Okay, now tell me something I don't know |
| 2001 | Pippa MacKay | | Commentaries on cancer remedies |
| 2002 | Lynley Hood | | A City Possessed: the Christchurch Civic Creche Case |
| 2002 | Noel O'Hare | New Zealand Listener | Health columns including Silent Spring Fever and Get your snake oil here |
| 2002 | Diana Wichtel | | A Monstrous, Lethal Arrogance |
| 2002 | Joe Bennett | | Press columns |
| 2003 | Alan Pickmere | | Alternative medicine claims in Northland |
| 2003 | Barry Colman | | Publication of transcripts from the Christchurch Civic Creche case |
| 2005 | Rose Hipkins | Campbell Live, TV3 | Comments regarding Intelligent Design |
| 2005 | Chris Barton | | Mannatech's sugar-coated moneymaker |
| 2005 | Tim Watkins | New Zealand Listener | Star Power |
| 2005 | Jeremy Wells | Eating Media Lunch | Article psychic and medium business |
| 2006 | David Russell | Consumer Institute | Leadership in critical thinking |
| 2006 | Linley Boniface | The Dominion Post | Clairvoyants dead wrong |
| 2007 | Tristram Clayton | 3 News | Psych Addictive |
| 2007 | Annette King | | Attempt to provide standards and accountability via the Therapeutic Products and Medicines Bill |
| 2008 | Kathryn Ryan | | Interviews with psychic Deb Webber and Detective Senior Sergeant Ross Levy |
| 2008 | Royal Society of New Zealand | | 2008 Big Science Adventure video competition |
| 2008 | Raybon Kan | The Sunday Star-Times | The column I see dud people |
| 2009 | Colin Peacock and Jeremy Rose | Mediawatch on Radio New Zealand National | "Every week Colin and Jeremy cast a critical eye on New Zealand media." |
| 2009 | Rob Harley and Anna McKessar | TV One | Documentary The Worst That Could Happen |
| 2009 | Hannah Ockelford | Closeup | Filtering the Truth |
| 2009 | Rebecca Palmer | The Dominion Post | The Devil's in the Details |
| 2010 | Kate Newton | The Dominion Post | Item on Victoria University's embarrassment over the homeopathy course it was offering |
| 2010 | Jane Luscombe | 3 News | An informative look at the belief that amber teething necklaces leach a substance to help babies with pain and depression. |
| 2010 | Linley Boniface | The Dominion Post | Column Why psychics should butt out of the Aisling Symes case |
| 2011 | Jan Wright | | |
| 2011 | Philip Matthews | Marlborough Express | Article on 1080 |
| 2011 | Janna Sherman | Greymouth Star | Sceptics revel in Hokitika ‘earthquake’ non-event |
| 2012 | Margo White | New Zealand Listener | Health columns |
| 2012 | Clive Solomon | Whanganui District Health Board | Supporting evidence-based medicine as the core focus for hospital care |
| 2013 | Shelley Bridgeman | The New Zealand Herald | Article Can we communicate with dead people? |
| 2013 | Darcy Cowan | SciBlogs | Getting the Immunisation Awareness Society status corrected within the Charities Register |
| 2014 | Graeme Hill | Radio Live | Challenging of pseudoscience on Radio Live |
| 2014 | Russel Norman | Green Party | |
| 2014 | TV One Breakfast Show | TV One | Coverage of the dangers of Miracle Mineral Solution. |
| 2015 | Ben Albert | University of Auckland | Excellent submission and submitting a letter to the Editor of the NZ Medical Journal |
| 2015 | Adam Smith | Massey University | Rebuttal in the Herald to TV3's emotional 3D programme on Gardasil |
| 2015 | Rosanna Price | Stuff | Skeptical angle on All Black, Waisake Naholo's "miracle" natural cure |
| 2015 | Simon Mitchell | University of Auckland | Rebuttal of claims made in an NZ Herald article entitled: Hope is in the air: Hyperbaric chambers – the real deal or a placebo? |
| 2016 | Lachlan Forsyth | Newshub | Writing pro-vaccine articles and publicly taking on the anti-vaxxers |
| 2016 | Jess Berentson-Shaw | The Spinoff | Skeptical parenting articles |
| 2016 | Laura Walters | Stuff | Article on 2016 New Zealand earthquakes providing scientific explanation for origin. |
| 2016 | Rachel Thomas | Stuff | Article debunking superfoods |
| 2016 | Mark Hanna & Mark Honeychurch | NZ Skeptics | Provided data to The New Zealand Medical Journal detailing scientific research into Chiropractic |
| 2017 | Rob Stock | Stuff | For his article Don't waste money on superfoods and supplements |
| 2017 | Duncan Grieve | NZ Herald | for his article criticising "Sensing Murder" in his article Sensing Murder a 'grotesque sham' |
| 2017 | Simon Maude | Stuff | For discussing Naturopathy and cancer sufferers speaking out in his article Naturopathy under microscope after cancer sufferers speak from under shadow of death |
| 2018 | Elanor Black | Stuff | For the article I tried a Shakti mat and it wasn't relaxing or fun |
| 2018 | Sarah Lang | North and South Magazine | For the article Breastfeeding: Why is it such a battle ground? |
| 2018 | James Mustapic | Spinoff TV | For the clip Repressed Memories: Sensing Murder, the show that refuses to die |
| 2018 | Jacob McSweeny | Whanganui Chronicle | For the article Whanganui woman says her $4000 water machine is a life-changer, but experts say otherwise |
| 2018 | David Farrier | The Spinoff | Special mention for The mystery of Zach, New Zealand's all-too-miraculous medical AI – |
| 2019 | Noel O’Hare | North & South magazine | For the article "Psychics like Jeanette Wilson are moving into the wellness industry and it's dangerous" |
| 2019 | Farah Hancock | Newsroom | For the article Homeopathic treatment claims to 'cure' autism in NZ |
| 2019 | Tom O’Connor | Stuff | For the article Snake oil claims allowed to go on too long |
| 2022 | Kate Hannah and Dr. Sanjana Hattotuwa of The Disinformation Project, Byron Clark, Marc Daalder | Stuff Circuit | For Hannah and Hattotuwa's efforts as part of The Disinformation Project to document and combat misinformation and disinformation in New Zealand. For Clark's effort to study and combat the rise of the alt right in New Zealand. For Daalder's science-based reporting of diverse issues including climate change, energy, technology, the COVID-19 pandemic, public housing, far right nationalism and violent extremism. For the Stuff Circuit's team "Fire and Fury" documentary which looked at the role of disinformation and violent extremism at the 2022 Wellington protest. |
| 2023 | Debunking Conspiracies Aotearoa, Skeptical Kiwi and New Zealand Conspiracy Loons | Facebook, YouTube | For the work that the facebook-based group Debunking Conspiracies Aotearoa does in identifying conspiracy theories in New Zealand. For the skeptical content that Skeptical Kiwi promotes also on facebook. For the work done by New Zealand Conspiracy Loons in calling out NZ conspiracy information on their satirical YouTube channel. |
| 2024 | Christchurch journalists | The Press | For a team effort reporting on cults in their region and supporting the Decult conference. The award specifically recognises work by Martin Van Beynen, Sinead Gill, Tatania Gibbs and Philip Matthews. |

=== Bent Spoon Award ===
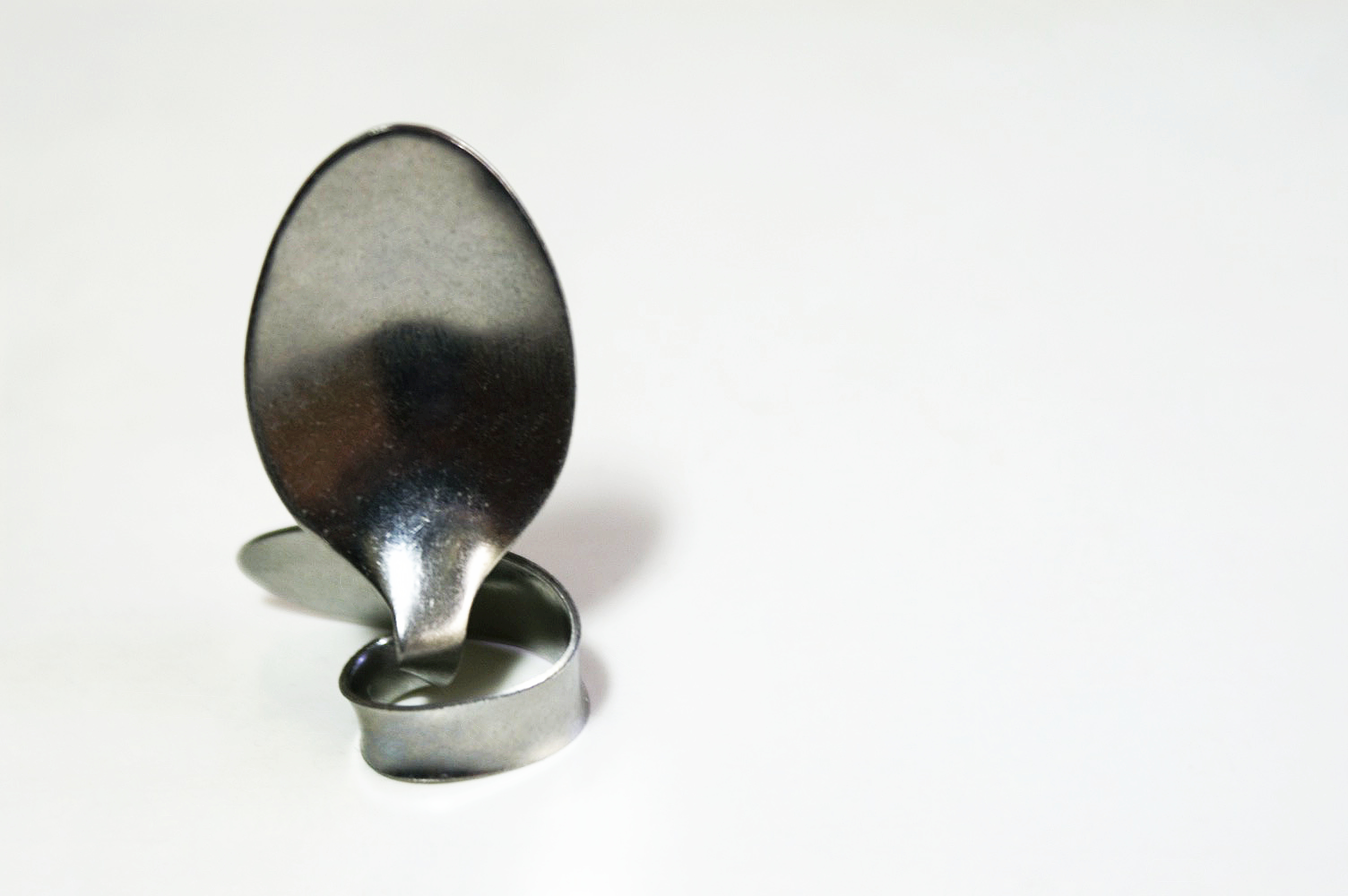

The Bent Spoon Award is "named in honour of Uri Geller". Throughout the year, selections are considered for the Bent Spoon award. Ideas are sent to the officers who gather and retain all ideas until the committee reviews candidates. Those considered "truly ridiculous", along with selections from outside New Zealand, are not usually considered. Typically, a dozen nominees are selected and voted on by the executive officers. The announcement is usually made in the few weeks leading into the annual conference in order to "help boost interest". Candidates considered must be "important enough to deserve attention", people who "should know better", and be "wilfully misleading with intent to profit." According to Chair-entityship Vicki Hyde in 1996, the group saw an increase in calls from the media which begin with '"We don't want to get the Bent Spoon so we thought we'd better check with you guys…"' It is gratifying to note that such calls have increased over the past four years."

Bent Spoon Award details
| Year | Recipient | Reason |
|---|---|---|
| 1992 | Consumers' Institute | Alternative medicine article |
| 1993 | Country Calendar | Biodynamics as a serious pest control option |
| 1994 | TV3 | Satanic Memories documentary |
| 1995 | Ministry of Justice | Hitting Home report on domestic violence. |
| 1996 | New Zealand Qualifications Authority | For seriously considering awarding a Bachelor of Science status for a course at Aoraki Polytech on naturopathy |
| 1997 | Correspondence School | Numerology lessons in maths class |
| 1998 | TV2 | For misleading the public over the truthfulness of an alleged documentary on alien abductions |
| 1999 | Paul Holmes | Coverage given to the Liam Williams-Holloway case |
| 2000 | Wellington Hospital | Supporting healing hands therapy by its nurses |
| 2001 | TopShelf Production | Hallelujah Healing documentary on faith-healing |
| 2002 | Jeanette Fitzsimons | For supporting the concept of biodynamic's "etheralised Cosmic-Astral influences" as a means of ridding New Zealand of possums |
| 2003 | Justice Minister Phil Goff | For refusing to open the can of worms that is the Christchurch Civic Creche case (Goff was awarded the first-ever Bent Can Opener Award from the New Zealand Skeptics) |
| 2004 | 20/20 | For reporter Melanie Reid's 22 August segment "Back from the Dead" profiling Taranaki medium Jeanette Wilson |
| 2005 | Tertiary Education Commission | For identifying homeopathic training as a nationally important strategic priority for New Zealand. |
| 2006 | Diana Burns | Come and Be Healed the article in the Listener on Brazilian medium and "miracle-worker" João de Deus. |
| 2007 | TV3 news and Current Affairs and Carol Hirschfeld | For her 31 August interview with self-proclaimed energy healer and clairvoyant Simone Simmons, who claims to be visited regularly by the spirit of Diana, 10 years after the death of the Princess of Wales. |
| 2008 | Detective Senior Sergeant Ross Levy | For promoting psychics as "just another tool" in the investigative policing toolbox, helping the "exploitainment" show Sensing Murder |
| 2009 | Clyde and Steve Graf | For their documentary Poisoning Paradise – Ecocide in New Zealand which claims that 1080 kills large numbers of native birds, poisons soils, persists in water and interferes with human hormones. |
| 2010 | Rural Women New Zealand and Fonterra | For supporting homeopathic practices on the farm, thereby indicating an ignorance of basic science and a lack of concern for animal welfare. |
| 2011 | Gullible media outlets and personalities | For taking Ken Ring's earthquake prediction claims at face value |
| 2012 | Consumer magazine | For continuing to promote homeopathic products as a viable alternative to evidence-based medical treatments |
| 2013 | Hamilton City Council | For ignoring the evidence of the public health value of fluoridation |
| 2014 | Steffan Browning | For signing a petition that called on the World Health Organisation to "End the suffering of the Ebola crisis, by testing and distributing homeopathy as quickly as possible to contain the outbreaks." |
| 2015 | Pharmacy Council | For suggesting, when faced with the fact that pharmacists were not complying with their Code of Ethics, that a viable solution was to change their Code of Ethics. |
| 2016 | The New Zealand Herald | For publishing a variety of pseudoscience articles presented as fact without refutation |
| 2017 | New Zealand Veterinary Association | For their attempt to balance the need for evidence-based treatments for animals with the desire of veterinarians to sell unproven therapies |
| 2018 | TVNZ – Seven Sharp & Hilary Barry | For coverage of a story about health fears from mobile phone towers. The story featured a woman who has built a wall to keep out radiation after two mobile phone towers were built near her home. After the segment Hilary Barry expressed her opinion that she "wouldn't want to live beside two" phone towers and that she "would be tempted to build a wall like Marta has". |
| 2019 | Wellington City Council and contractor Downer Group | For showing the most egregious gullibility in 2019 for the contractor's use of water divining to find underground pipes |
| 2021 | Simon Thornley | "For stand[ing] out as an academic who has opposed NZ's approach to dealing with COVID." |
| 2022 | Sean Plunket | For using his online media platform The Platform to host controversial hosts such as the far right Counterspin Media, Chantelle Baker, Jordan Peterson, Brian Tamaki, Avi Yemini, and Bob McCoskrie. Lack of understanding of science and public policy regarding vaccination, the Three Waters reform programme, climate change, and the work of The Disinformation Project. |
| 2023 | NZ Skeptics | In recognition that the organisation was unjustified in awarding the 1995 Bent Spoon Award to the Ministry of Justice for the report Hitting Home. In holding itself publicly accountable, NZ Skeptics acknowledges that their claim the report "trivialises the real domestic violence that goes on in New Zealand" was not justified as later careful reading of the report showed that the authors were "well aware of these potential issues, and were careful to let the readers know of the factors that needed to be borne in mind when reading the report". The current committee of NZ Skeptics unanimously agreed the award was not justified and offer an apology to the authors of the report. The Bent Spoon is awarded to NZ Skeptics for a "lack of critical thinking". |
| 2024 | King Charles | For promoting pseudoscientific alternative medicine. King Charles' decision to appoint a homeopathy-appointing doctor as head of the royal medical household in December 2023 had previously raised concerns amongst academics, including Edzard Ernst, emeritus professor at the University of Exeter, who said the support for homeopathy undermines "undermining evidence-based medicine and rational thinking". |

== Photo gallery ==
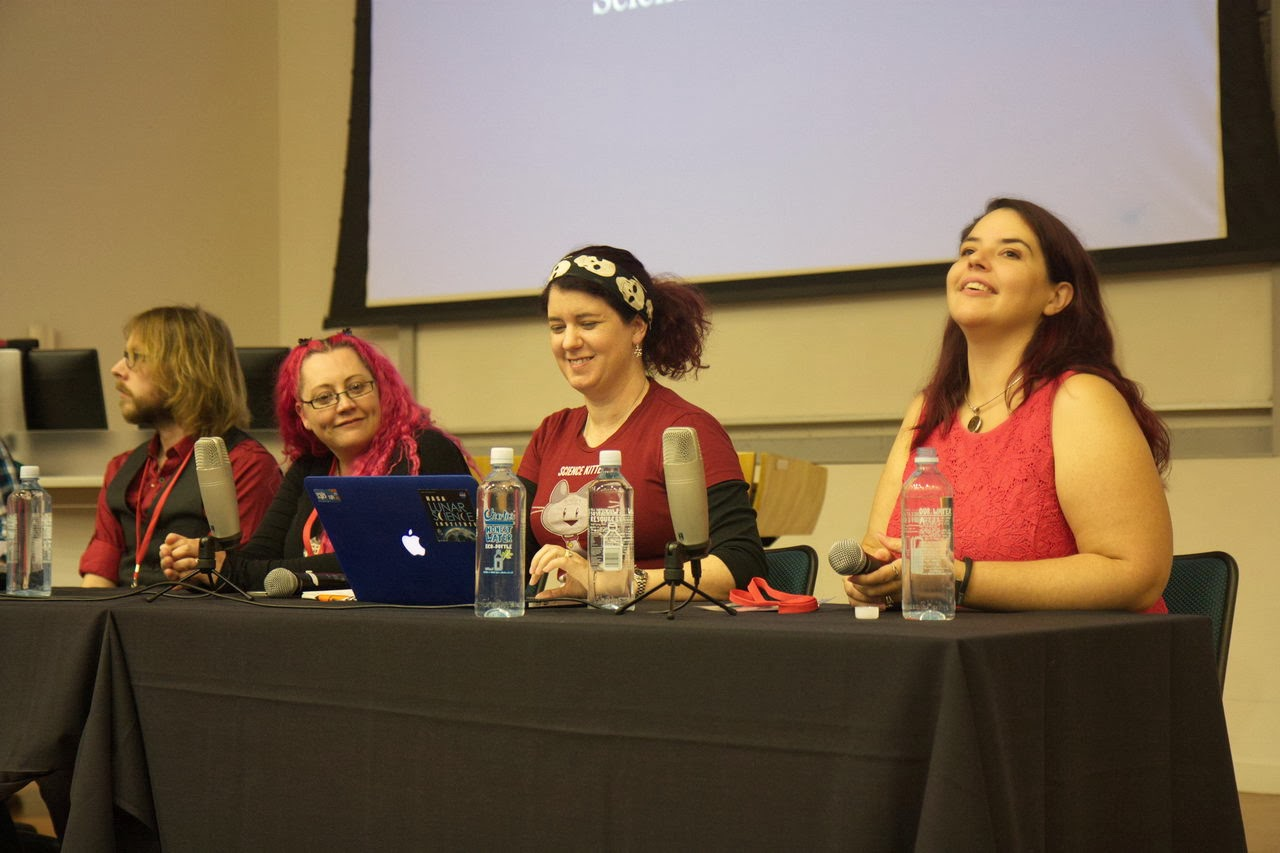
Panel discussion with Elf Eldridge, Siouxsie Wiles, Kylie Sturgess and Pamela Gay 2013

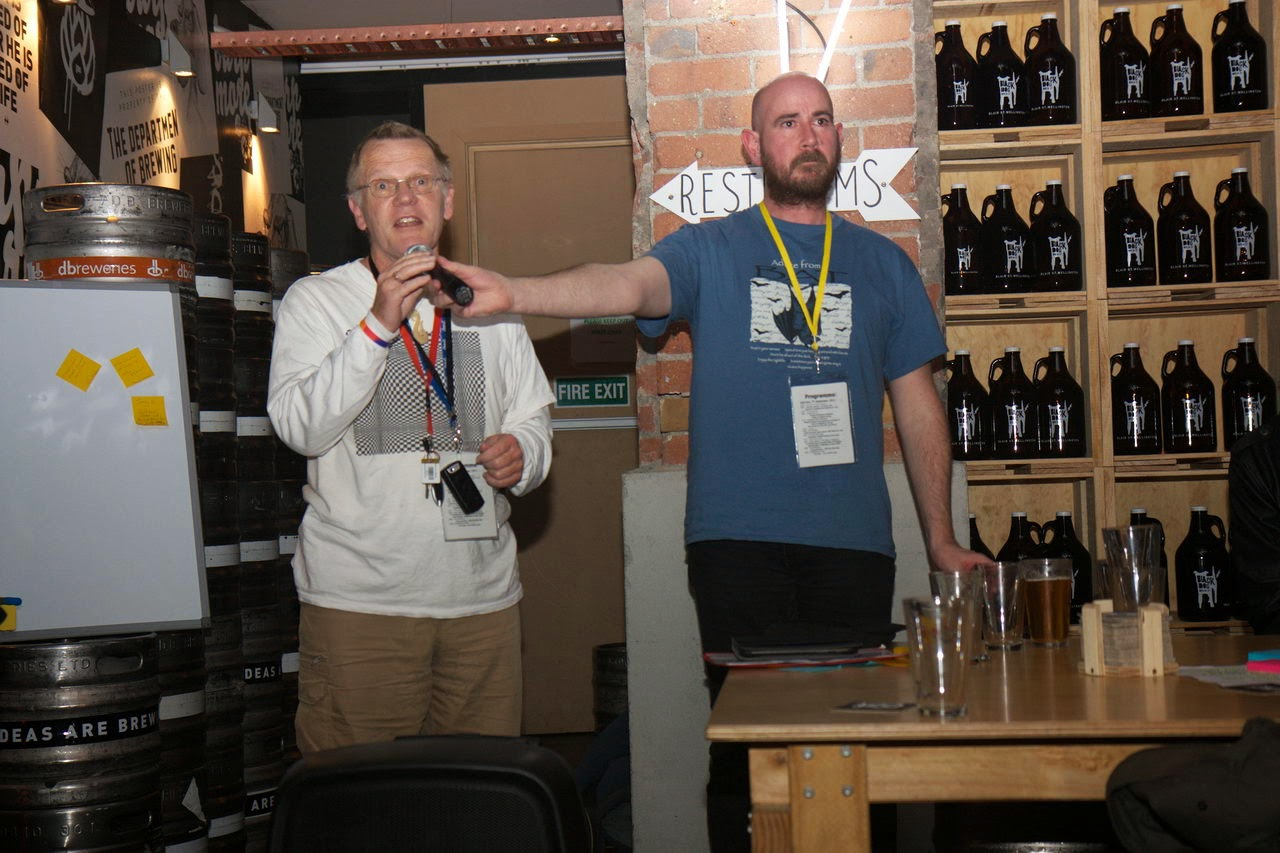
Hugh Young and Gold – SkeptiCamp Wellington 2013

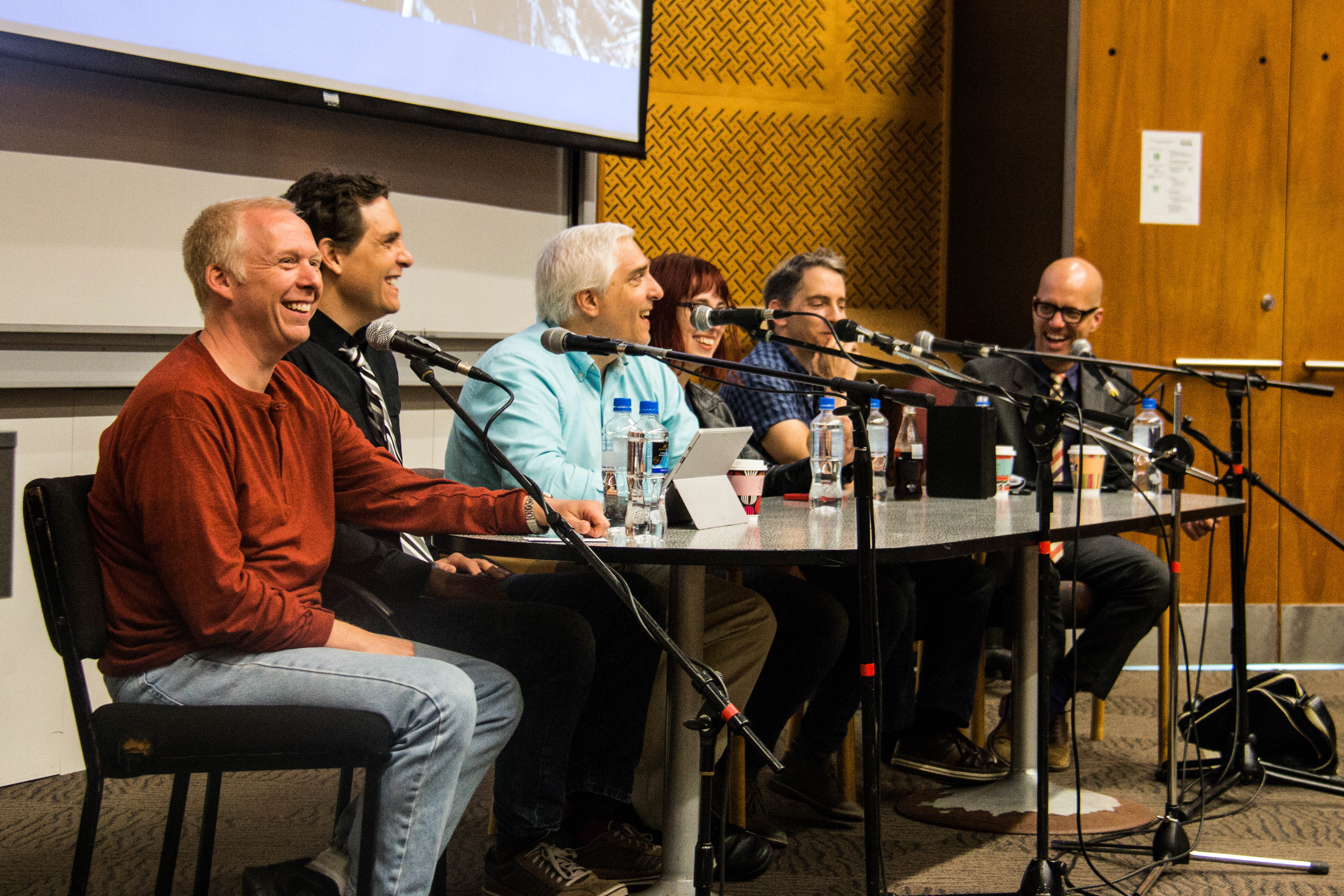
Skeptic's Guide to the Universe live recording 2014

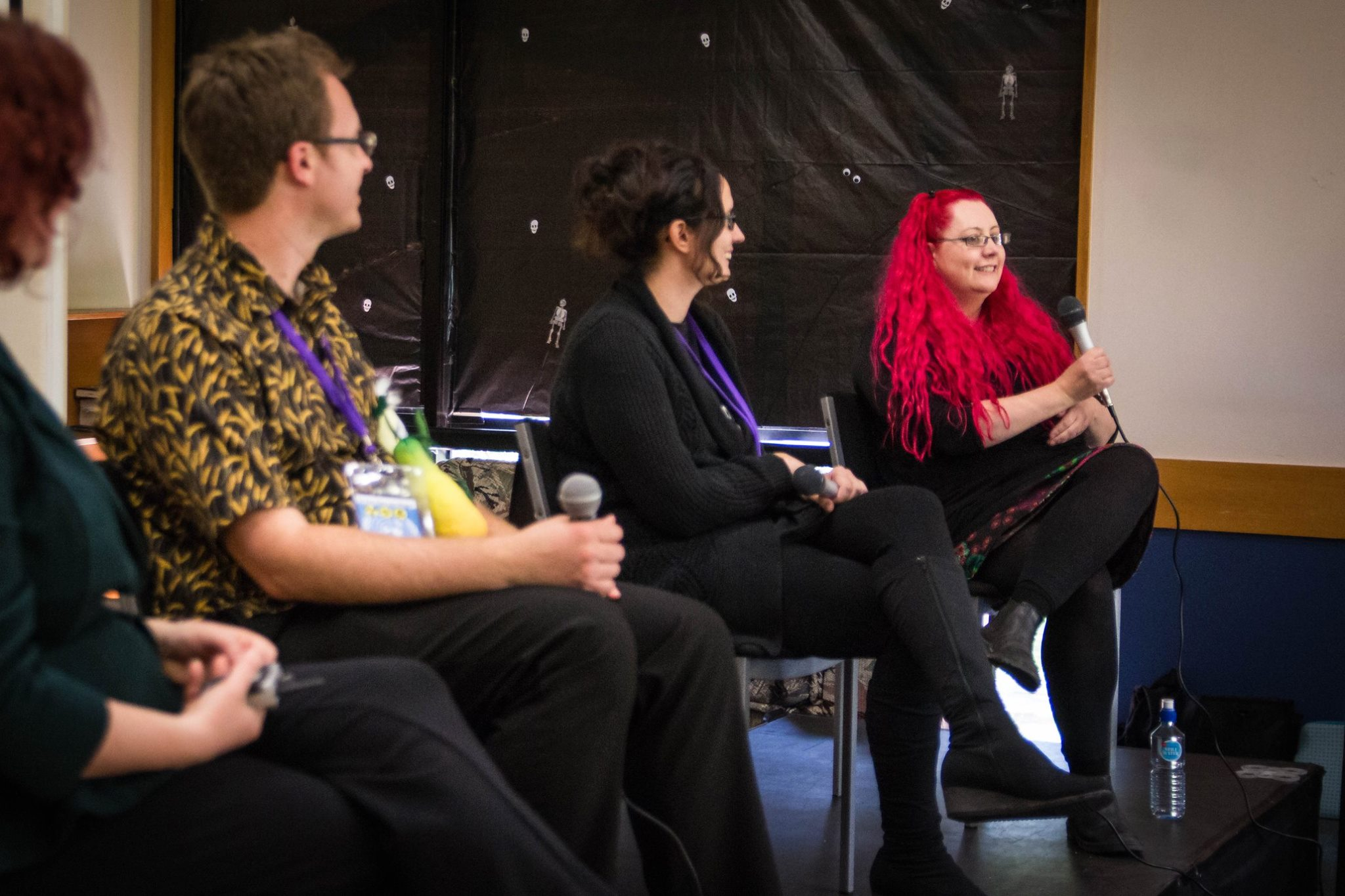
Panel discussion 2015

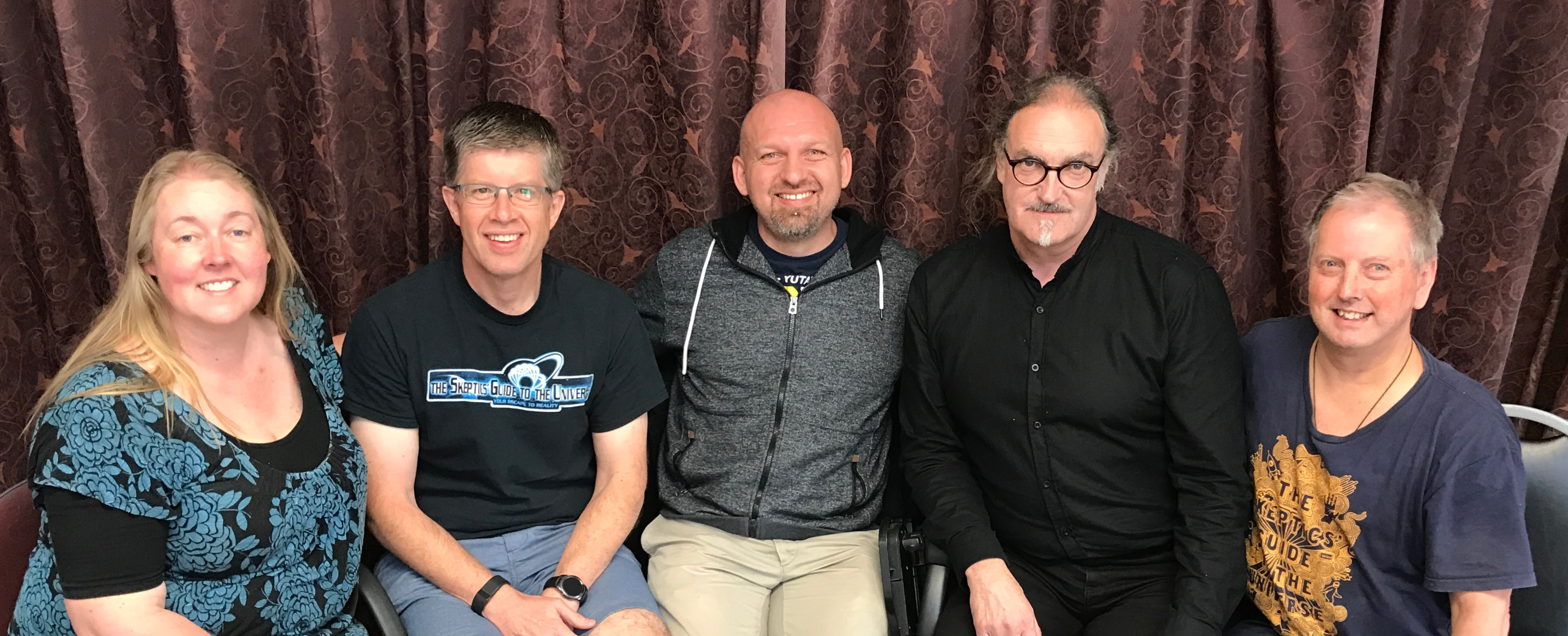
NZ Skeptic Committee 2016 Sheree McNatty, Craig Shearer, Mark Honeychurch, Brad MacClure, Clive Hackett

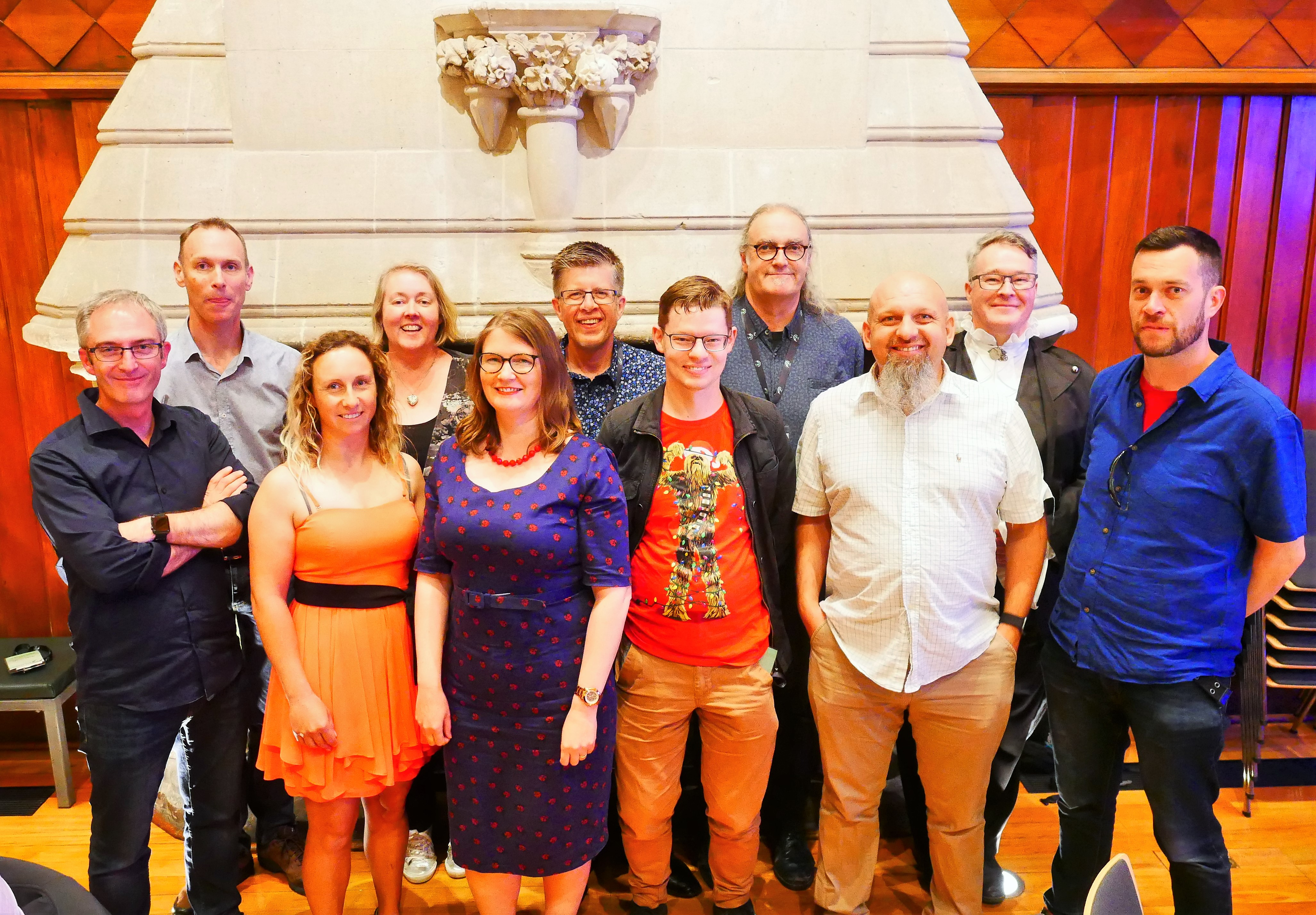
NZ Skeptic leadership and Committee members Left to right, front to back: Jonny Grady, Amy Ballantyne, Jess MacFarlane, Daniel Ryan, Mark Honeychurch, Aaron Davies. Row 2: Stephen Steven Galbraith (not on 2020 committee), Sheree McNatty (Secretary), Craig Shearer (chair), Brad MacClure, Russell Tomes, Treasurer Paul Ashton (missing)

== See also ==
- Homeopathy in New Zealand
