= Complementary Medicine Evaluation Programme =

Swiss government program

In 1998, the Swiss government began a comprehensive Program for Evaluating Complementary Medicine (PEK : Programm Evaluation Komplementärmedizin = Program for Evaluating Complementary Medicine) to study the role and effectiveness of complementary medicine, which was playing an ever-increasing role in the Swiss medical system.

According to the PEK Report, results of the evaluation were inconclusive, and in June 2005, the five complementary therapies under evaluation – anthroposophical medicine, homeopathy, neural therapy, phytotherapy and traditional Chinese medicine (more precisely, traditional Chinese herbal therapy) – were removed from the list of services covered by the compulsory health insurance scheme (KLV).

== Summary of the PEK Report ==
The complete text of the 24 April 2005 version of the "Programm Evaluation Komplementärmedizin" Report, (also referred to as PEK, "Program for Evaluating Complementary Medicine" and "Complementary Medicine Evaluation Programme"), is available from the Swiss Parliament website and also from the Swiss Federal Office of Health (BAG) PEK download webpage.

The official data is available (in German and French) from the Swiss Federal Office of Public Health (BAG) data download page.

=== Background ===
Following the decision taken by the Swiss Federal Department of Home Affairs (DHA) on 9 July 1998, five complementary therapies – anthroposophical medicine, homeopathy, neural therapy, phytotherapy and traditional Chinese medicine (more precisely, traditional Chinese herbal therapy) – were included on 1 July 1999 for a limited period (until 30 June 2005) in the list of services covered by the compulsory health insurance scheme (KLV). These five services were only eligible for reimbursement if they were provided by physicians who had the relevant proficiency certificates, issued by the Swiss Medical Association (FMH).

The decision on whether these complementary methods would be retained within the basic health insurance scheme was to be based on their efficacy, appropriateness and cost-effectiveness being demonstrated. To this end, the Complementary Medicine Evaluation Programme (PEK) was carried out from 1998 to 2005.

=== Design of the PEK ===
A basic procedure was defined, comprising two parts.

In Part 1 (evaluation of the provision of complementary medicine for patients in Switzerland), empirical studies were to be carried out, permitting conclusions as to:

a) how prevalent the five therapies are in Switzerland,
b) which physicians offer these therapies,
c) which patients have recourse to them,
d) what results are achieved with these treatments, and
e) what impact these therapies have on costs.

For points b), c), and e), comparisons were made with conventional medicine. On account of methodological and time-related problems, however, point d) could not be evaluated.

In Part 2 (literature analysis), the literature available internationally on efficacy, appropriateness (here primarily defined in terms of safety and utilization) and cost-effectiveness was to be systematically compiled and reviewed.

=== Outcomes ===
Part 1 was carried out by a team from the Panmedion Foundation, a pro-CAM think tank. The results were not published in the peer-reviewed literature but an expanded version was separately published a translation as "Homeopathy in Healthcare: Effectiveness, Appropriateness, Safety, Costs". This paper, promoted by homeopathy supporters as a "Swiss government report" was strongly criticised and characterised as "a case study of research misconduct" due to undeclared conflicts of interest, reversal of the normal hierarchy of evidence and other concerns, prompting Dr. Felix Gurtner of the Swiss Federal Office of Public Health to disown its purported status.

Part 2 was published in The Lancet as Are the clinical effects of homoeopathy placebo effects? Comparative study of placebo-controlled trials of homoeopathy and allopathy.

The terms-of-reference for the PEK study stated that the results of the study would determine which complementary medicines, if any, would continue to be supported by the national insurance program in Switzerland. However, before the study was completed and the final draft report reviewed by the international Review Board, the government announced that it would withdraw support for all complementary approaches to medicine.

Proponents of CAM (including the scientific director of the program) were dissatisfied with the outcome.

Both reports were given reduced weight

Following a referendum in which the authors of the Part 1 report acted as proponents, reimbursement was reinstated for a further trial period of 5 years from 2012.

== See also ==
- Healthcare in Switzerland
