= Mario Raviglione =

Mario C. Raviglione
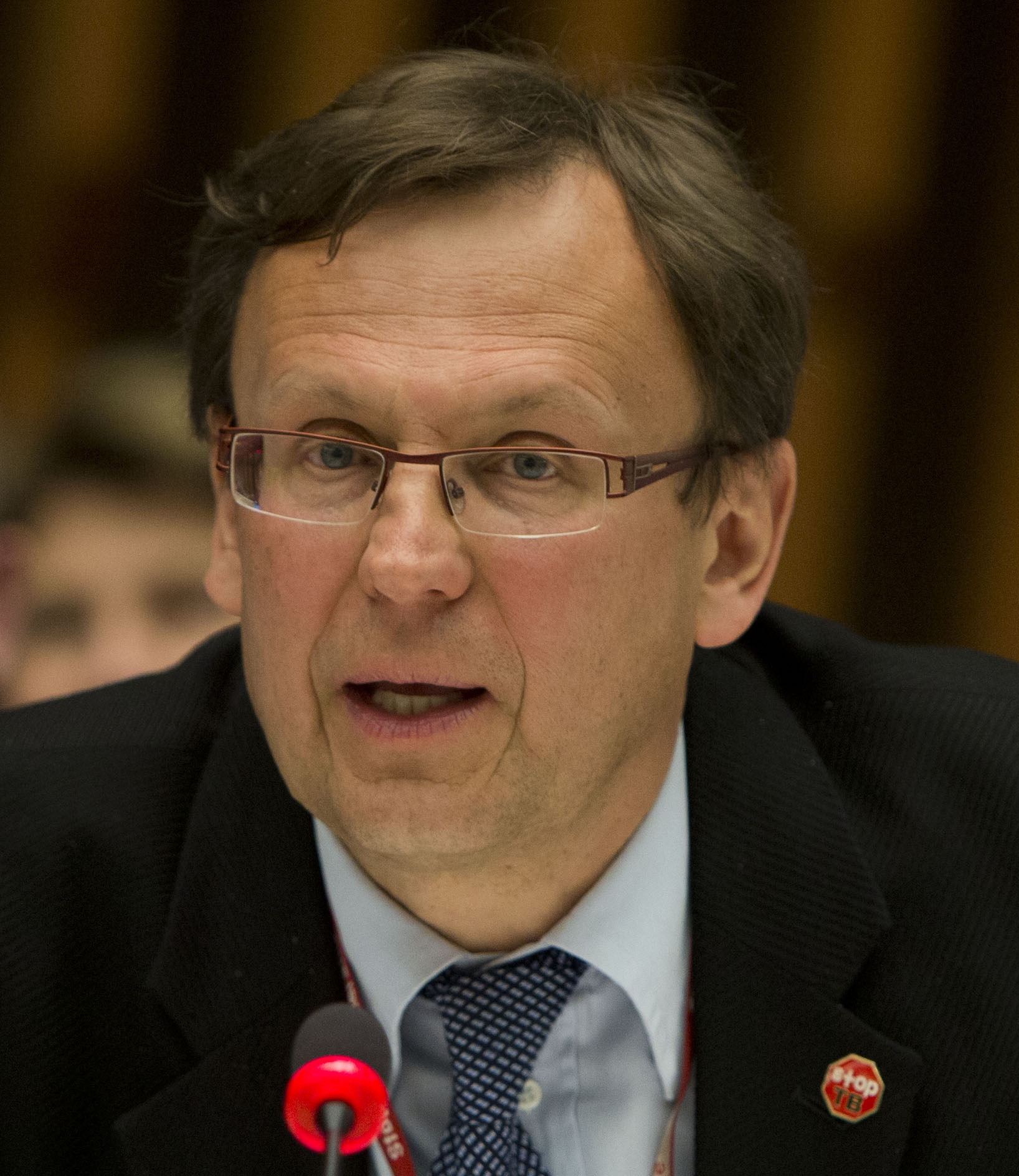
- Raviglione in 2013.
- Born: Biella, Italy
- Education: University of Turin
- Occupations: Professor of Global Health, TB expert and former Director of the WHO Global TB Programme
- Years active: 1981–present
- Spouse: Angela Paraluppi Raviglione

Mario C. B. Raviglione is adjunct professor of Global Health at the University of Milan, Italy, and co-coordinator of the Master Course in Global Health. At the same university, since 2018 and until October 2025, he had served as Full Professor of Global Health. In that capacity he directed global health didactic and research activities also as part of the Centre for Multidisciplinary Research in Health Science (MACH). Past activities included teaching global health principles to pre-graduate medical students, making the University of Milan one of the pioneers world-wide introducing global health as a module among the required curricular courses. At the same university, between 2020 and 2025 Raviglione established and directed the first international Master Course in Global Health in Italy and one of the very few online worldwide. At the University of Milan, Raviglione was recipient of several research grants from research financing institutions such as the European Commission including EU-PEARL, UNITE4TB, ENDVOC and JA GHI, the European Joint Action to maximise the impact of the EU global health strategy.

In 2019 and 2020, Raviglione was Professeur Titulaire at the Global Studies Institute (GSI), Université de Genève, Suisse. Through the GSI, he has worked within the context of the Institute of Global Health. Previously, between 2003 and 2017, he was director of the Global Tuberculosis Programme at the World Health Organization (WHO). He graduated in medicine from the University of Turin in 1980 and then trained in internal medicine and Infectious Diseases at Cabrini Medical Center in New York City and at Beth Israel Medical Center in Boston where he was a Harvard University Clinical Fellow in Medicine and specialised in AIDS.

Back in Europe, Raviglione joined WHO in 1991 as a Junior Professional Officer, and spent a few years working on TB and AIDS, TB epidemiology in Europe, and anti-TB drug resistance surveillance and response. In the mid-1990s, he set up both the WHO global drug resistance surveillance project and the WHO global TB surveillance and monitoring systems. Among his major achievements are the contributions to the development of the WHO's DOTS Strategy in 1995, and the direction of the development of both the Stop TB Strategy in 2006 and the End TB Strategy in 2014. During his years at WHO he worked with, and visited, more than 50 countries supporting their TB care, prevention, control and research activities. His research work has resulted in over 350 scientific articles and chapters on the topics of infectious diseases, HIV/AIDS, TB, and global health, including the TB chapters in the last nine editions of Harrison's Principles of Internal Medicine.

Raviglione is editor of the 3rd and 4th (2006, 2009) edition of "Tuberculosis - A comprehensive international approach", a multi-author book, and associate editor of other books on public health, infectious diseases and tuberculosis. He directed the team that developed the book “Systematic screening for active tuberculosis – Principles and recommendations”, awarded by the British Medical Association as "Highly Commended Book" for Public Health in 2014. He is among the top 10 most cited authors in the TB field. His h-index is 121 (Google Scholar) and 94 (Scinapse) and his work has been cited over 69000 times. He is also among the top 25 Italian epidemiological scientists and the top 100 Italian scientists in general. As an expert in TB, he has worked as a teacher or visiting professor at Johns Hopkins University, University of Geneva, University of Modena and Reggio Emilia, and University of Pavia. He has been visiting professor at the University of Brescia and has recently lectured at major universities including Harvard, McGill and Sydney. He has participated in a variety of board of directors, scientific and advisory committees, including those of the TB Alliance, Doctors with Africa CUAMM, BE Health Association, Global Health Commission of the Missionary Sisters of the Sacred Heart - Cabrini Ministries, Fondazione 3Bi. and the McGill Global Health Programs International Advisory Board.

In 2017-2018 and in 2023 Raviglione was member of the Lancet Commission on TB. During 2015-2017 he conceived and co-organised, with WHO and the Russian Federation Ministry of Health, the first Global WHO Ministerial Conference on TB in the Sustainable Development Era, held in Moscow on 16–17 November 2017, and his team worked towards ensuring that TB is raised in the international political agenda through the United Nations General Assembly high-level meeting on TB that was held in 2018. As main Editor, he conceived and coordinated with other global health authorities the publication of a landmark book "Global Health Essentials" part of the Springer series devoted to the UN Sustainable Development Goals (SDGs). This manual is a book written by an international panel of over 150 experts from 70 institutions across 30 countries, and provides an exploration of key global health challenges, issues, and solutions.

In 2005, Raviglione received the Princess Chichibu TB Global Award for his achievements in TB control. In 2009 he was nominated Fellow of the Royal College of Physicians (F.R.C.P., London, UK). In 2010, he received the Wolfheze 20 Year Jubilee Award for his contributions to modern TB control practices in Europe. In 2014, he was appointed a Foundation Fellow of the European Respiratory Society (F.E.R.S.). In 2014, he received the Lifetime Achievement Award by the India International Public Health Conference of the Indian Medical Association. In 2016 he was made Honorary Member of the Russian Society of Phtisiatry and in 2017 he received the USAID Global Leader Award "in recognition of innovative approach, scientific rigor, and dedicated service in partnership to End TB". In 2018 he received the "Sigillo Trecentesco" recognition from the City of Trieste for the global fight against tuberculosis and for his support to the response to an outbreak of TB among children in Trieste in 2016. In November 2019 he received the title of honorary professor at the Centre for Immunobiology within the Blizard Institute, Queen Mary University of London, U.K. In 2023 he received the "Rocco Mazzarone Award" by the Fondazione Le Monacelle, Matera, Italy.
