= Mark Bryan (veterinarian) =

New Zealand veterinarian and entrepreneur

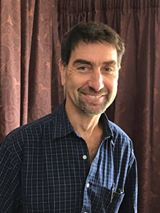
- 2016
- Education: BSc (Vet), Glasgow University 1988 Masters in Epidemiology, Massey University 2004
- Board member of: New Zealand Veterinary Association
- Awards: Finalist, 2013 Ernst & Young Entrepreneur of the Year 2009, British Cattle Veterinary Association Congress – Winner of President’s Award for Best Presentation
- Mark Bryan Voice recorded in December 2016

Mark Bryan is a veterinarian, landlord and researcher working in New Zealand. He is a director of VetSouth, one of two clinical research clinics in the South Island and Adjunct Senior Lecturer in Dairy Cattle Medicine at Massey University. In 2013 he was a finalist in the Ernst & Young Entrepreneur of the Year. He is a board member of the New Zealand Veterinary Association.

== Career ==
Bryan qualified as a veterinarian in Glasgow, Scotland in 1988 and worked in intensive dairy practice in the North of England. He moved to Waikato, New Zealand in 1995. In 2004 gained his Masters in Epidemiology from Massey University in Palmerston North. Bryan moved to New Zealand in 1995 and to his current practice in 1997.

He joined Central Southland Vets in Winton in 1997, heading up the dairy side of the practice, then became a director in 2001. When the clinic merged with another in nearby Gore in 2005, Bryan became the managing director of the new entity. He aimed to tackle the challenge of attracting and retaining in-demand veterinary school graduates, as well as participating in research.

Bryan established collaborations between New Zealand veterinarians and the UK's XLVets organization. This led to the development of the Welfarm assurance programme, which measures the welfare of dairy cows using a series of indicators. As the number of participating producers increased, it became possible to establish benchmarks from shared data.

Bryan's veterinary service created an app called Disease and Mortality Incident Tracker, or dam-iT, to capture disease and mortality data in production animals. It aims to provide a baseline of normal mortality rates on New Zealand farms as there are no national disease statistics. Creation of the app was partly prompted by deaths on herbicide tolerant swedes and fodder beet in 2014 and following years.

VetSouth has been running the Welfarm pilot for 3 years and identified the use of antibiotics as an issue to address. The New Zealand Veterinary Association has recently announced that they are aiming to phase out the use of non- essential antibiotic usage by 2030. Their strategic intent is that “by 2030, NZ Inc would not need antibiotics for the maintenance of animal health and welfare”.

Bryan is active in the veterinary and general communities promoting animal welfare and good veterinary practices. and in promoting the welfare of veterinarians in general. He spoke at the 2015 Pan Pacific Veterinary Conference and at the NZ Skeptics Conference in 2016. Bryan was to be a Dairy Speaker at the 36th World Veterinary Association Congress in Auckland, New Zealand on 6–8 April 2020, which was cancelled at the outset of the COVID-19 pandemic.

== Recent publications ==
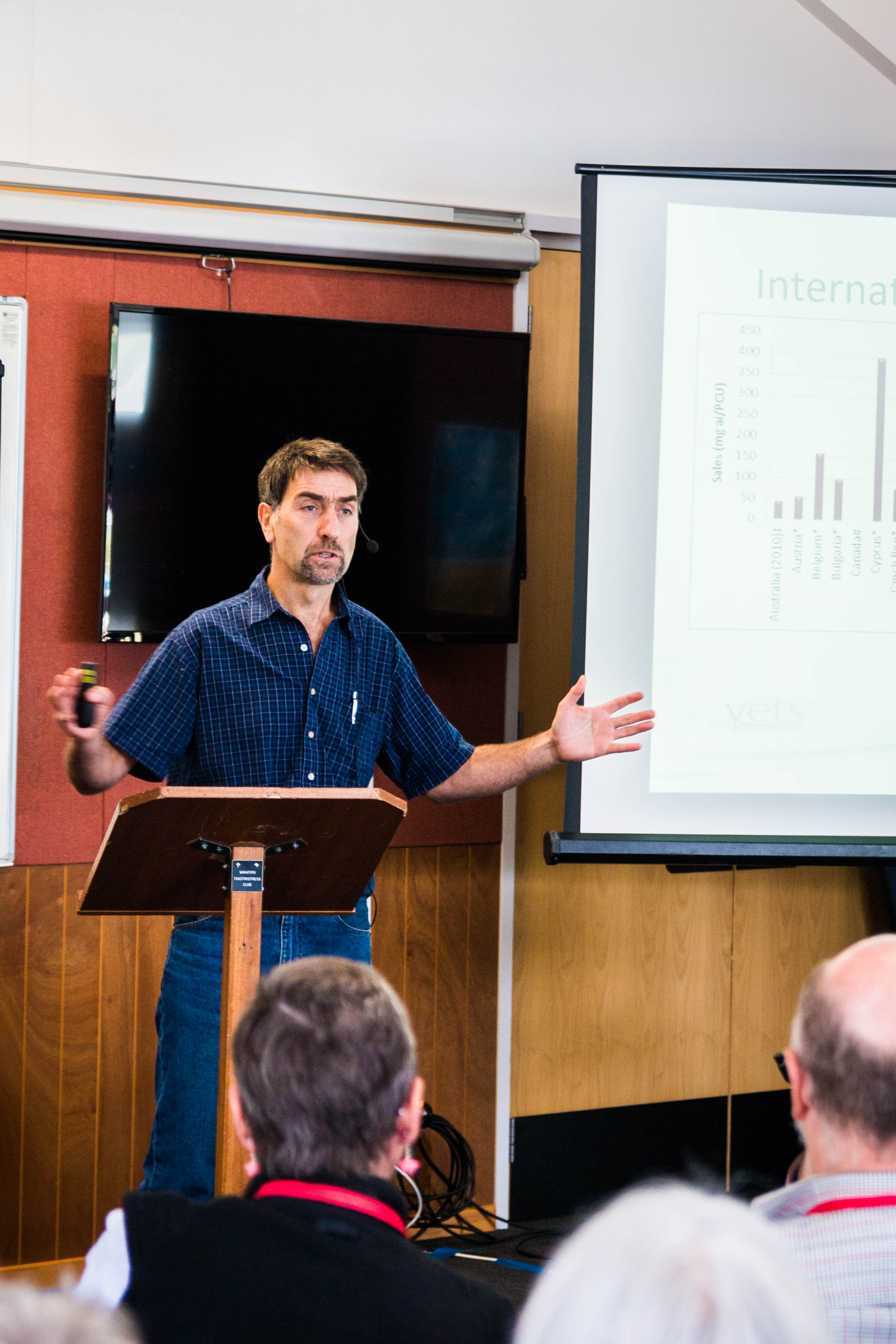
Speaking to the New Zealand Skeptics 2016

- Hillerton JE, Irvine CR, Bryan MA, Scott D, Merchant SC. (2016) Use of antimicrobials for animals in New Zealand, and in comparison with other countries. New Zealand Veterinary Journal, Forthcoming articles, pp 1–7, Mar 2016; DOI: 10.1080/00480169.2016.1171736
- Compton, C. W. R., McDougall, S., Young, L., & Bryan, M. A. (2014). Prevalence of subclinical ketosis in mainly pasture-grazed dairy cows in New Zealand in early lactation. New Zealand Veterinary Journal 62: 30–37.
- M.A. Bryan, G Bó, R J Mapletoft, F R Emslie, The use of equine chorionic gonadotropin in the treatment of anestrous dairy cows in gonadotropin-releasing hormone/progesterone protocols of 6 or 7 days. Journal of Dairy Science 96(1), October 2012
- M Bryan, H Tacoma, F Hoekstra, The effect of hindclaw height differential and subsequent trimming on lameness in large dairy cattle herds in Canterbury, New Zealand. New Zealand veterinary journal 60(6):349–55, September 2012
- MA Bryan, C Heuer, F R Emslie, The comparative efficacy of two long-acting drycow cephalonium products in curing and preventing intramammary infections. New Zealand veterinary journal 59(4):166–73, July 2011
- MA Bryan, G A Bó, C Heuer, F R Emslie, Use of equine chorionic gonadotrophin in synchronised AI of seasonal-breeding, pasture-based, anoestrous dairy cattle. Reproduction Fertility and Development 22(1):126–31, January 2010
- S. McDougall, M. A. Bryan, R.M. Tiddy, Erratum to “Effect of treatment with the nonsteroidal antiinflammatory meloxicam on milk production, somatic cell count, probability of re-treatment, and culling of dairy cows with mild clinical mastitis” (J. Dairy Sci. 92:4421–4431). Journal of Dairy Science 92(11):5765-5765, November 2009
