= Social Security Act 1938 =

The Social Security Act 1938 is a New Zealand act of Parliament concerning unemployment insurance which established New Zealand as a welfare state. This act is important in the history of social welfare, as it is said to have “provided the most comprehensive interpretation of social security at that time.”

== Background ==
After winning the 1935 election the newly elected First Labour Government immediately issued a Christmas bonus to the unemployed. However, a regular unemployment benefit was not introduced until the passing of the Social Security Act in 1938; that benefit was "payable to a person 16 years of age and over who has been in New Zealand for at least 12 months and is unemployed, is capable of and willing to undertake suitable work, and has taken reasonable steps to secure employment"

New Zealand did have several extant social welfare benefits started by the Liberal Government which implemented a tax-funded means tested old-age pension in 1898 and widows benefit in 1911. A limited form of payment to the unemployed was created during the Great Depression of the early 1930s by the United/Reform Coalition.

The development of social security policy, a commitment which all Labour MPs were enthusiastic about, but was itself a subject of considerable division within the government. Finance Minister Walter Nash initially proposed a contributory, national insurance type scheme though the caucus rejected it. Arnold Nordmeyer chaired both the caucus committee and the parliamentary select committee which were set up to consider the matter more in depth. After much discussion and debate the committees recommended a scheme for a means-tested pension, a universal superannuation, provisions for universal medical benefits (hospital treatment, maternity benefits and general practitioner consultations) which would all to be financed from direct taxation. At Nordmeyer's insistence, both the health and pensions schemes were combined into one measure.

The recommendations given became the basis of what was to be incorporated in the Social Security Act.

== Implementation ==
Savage gave a broadcast to the nation on 2 April 1938 outlining the Labour government's intentions and details of the proposed bill. He outlined the details of a comprehensive scheme of social security to provide "a condition of social security unsurpassed in any other country in the world". He stressed that the scheme had been carefully costed and was easily affordable to allay fears of tear away government spending. The details specified the following:

- A means tested old age pension of £78 a year (30 shillings per week) to women over 60 and men over 65
- A national superannuation scheme of £10 per annum (rising by £2 10s each year to reach the same level as the old age pension) to all aged 65 and over
- All existing allowances for the unemployed, widows, orphans, veterans and the disabled were either continued or increased
- A universal healthcare system providing free hospital treatment, free medicine, a maternity benefit and subsidized doctors visits

The scheme was to be funded by raising the existing level of income tax on wages from 8d in the pound to 1s and continuing the existing levy of £1 on every man over 20 years of age. To implement and administer all of the governments promises the Social Security Department would be established which would absorb the existing Pensions Department as well as the Employment Division of the Department of Labour. Savage also announced that the bill would contain a provision that it would not come into force until 1 April 1939, thereby giving the opposition National Party the opportunity to revoke it if they won the election scheduled for October that year as an inducement to re-elect Labour for another term.

== Reaction ==
Reverend W. H. A. Vickery (the mayor of Kaiapoi) sent Savage a letter suggesting he use the term "applied Christianity" to describe the government's scheme, which was adopted by Savage. The opposition National Party were highly critical of the scheme raising concerns over the expense and criticizing the increased taxation that would result. National Party leader Adam Hamilton said Labour was wrong to claim that the benefits were free as everyone would be in the tax-gatherer's net and have to pay for everything they received. Prominent National MP Sidney Holland unsuccessfully parodied Savage's description calling it "applied lunacy", which earned himself public displeasure. The scheme was also criticized by the radical-left in the Labour Party with MPs Gervan McMillan and Arnold Nordmeyer feeling the government had not gone far enough.

The largest apprehension came from the New Zealand Branch of the British Medical Association (BMA) over the implementation of free general practitioner consultations. Doctors refused to accept a state fee for their services arguing that the doctor–patient relationship was dependent on direct payments from the patient. It would not be until 1941 that a compromise was reached where doctors charged patients directly and the patient could then claim a social security refund.

The initiative received attention internationally as well. A 1939 government report in the United States of America for the Roosevelt administration described New Zealand as having made "the first attempt on a national scale to combine under one integrated system of economic security protection against all hazards which are covered by social insurance in other countries".

== Outcomes ==
The Social Security Act (as intended) became one of the main issues at the 1938 election campaign. Savage had used the act to set the agenda for the election which he thought would virtually guarantee Labour victory. Indeed, Labour was decisively re-elected increasing its share of the votes by 10% from 45 to 55 percent, though it actually did not gain any extra seats. As predicted, the expense to fund the scheme was high. It was estimated to cost £17.85 million in its first year, up from just £7.5 million per-annum spent on the previous social services.

The policies and emphases of the Social Security Act would set the social pattern of New Zealand for several generations. New Zealand was to remain a government regulated welfare state until the early 1990s when new neo-liberal policies (labeled Ruthanasia) superseded much of the surviving policies of the First Labour Government.

== See also ==
- National Insurance (Australia)
- Welfare in New Zealand
