= Ken Ring (writer) =

New Zealand writer (died 2026)

Kenneth Anton Dermot Ring (16 January 1945 – 21 October 2026) was a New Zealand writer who asserted that he could use lunar cycles to predict weather and earthquakes. He termed his predictions "alternative weather" and had authored books about the weather and climate. Ring published almanacs each year for New Zealand, Australia and Ireland in which he provided weather predictions for the entire year. His New Zealand almanac covers 64 towns. Ring's methods have been shown to be unscientific and have been widely confirmed as fake and pseudoscience by many scientists in the fields of meteorology and geology.

Ring said he predicted the 4 September 2010 Christchurch earthquake and the deadly 22 February 2011 Christchurch earthquake. He also said there would probably be an earthquake in Marlborough or north Canterbury "just before noon" on 20 March 2011. This caused some residents to leave Christchurch and led to criticism from scientists and sceptics. Further research into his predictions showed that his forecasting record did not hold up under scrutiny.

== Early life ==
Ring was born in England during World War II, on 16 January 1945, and emigrated with his family to New Zealand in the 1960s.

== Mathman ==
Ring was a mathematics teacher, musician, actor, clown, speech therapist, private tutor to children with learning difficulties, teacher of English as a second language, and part-time teachers' college lecturer. He had used magic to teach children about mathematics, performing under the name "Mathman", and had written books on mathematics, magic, teaching and music. He also co-wrote a book on reading cats' paws, which he says "was a joke".

He also claimed in the past to being "University Science Trained", though he was never able to show any qualifications to support that unfounded claim.

== Predicting weather ==
Ring was known for attempting to predict weather and authors books on "how the moon affects the weather", which included an almanac each year for New Zealand (since 1999), Australia (since 2006) and Ireland (since 2010). He believed that the cycle of weather followed a lunar pattern and could be used to predict weather many years in advance. The supposed lunar cycle that Ring used was stated to occur every 9 years, though no such lunar cycle actually exists in reality, while the solar cycle repeats at 11-year intervals and by assessing the two, Ring believed that the weather recycles through a 355-day cycle, a 19-year cycle, and a 36-year cycle. According to his website, it is not an exact science—it has been shown to not follow any scientific methodology. When questioned about the proven inaccuracies in his predictions, Ring claimed that his rainfall predictions can be out by 24 hours and a radius of 50 to 60 miles (80 to 97 km). On 1 February 2023, he extended the amount of time that his predictions could be out to 168 hours (1 Week) in a comment on his Facebook Page.

His New Zealand almanac covered 64 towns. He also wrote columns for farming and fishing publications and was an on-call weather reporter for Channel 7's Today Tonight show. He said he provided forecasts for specific events including the Melbourne Cup, Ellerslie Flower Show and the Auckland Santa Parade. Ring spoke at various business and media events and produced long range weather predictions for the Gisborne City Council through to 2020.

He termed his predictions "alternative weather," which are not supported by any current science. Author of the New Zealand Weather Book and MetService employee Erick Brenstrum, wrote a column in the New Zealand Geographic analysing his 2005 predictions. He compared two weather systems (the northwest winds that bring rain to the west coast and lows that bring rain to the east coast) and stated that out of 40 occurrences only 1 matched with Ring's predictions. Ken replied accusing Brenstrum of bullying, insisting he had proof of an 85 percent success rate, to which the editor responded with: "...once you publish a book, you're fair game for public scrutiny of its content and your own competence." Retired schoolteacher and amateur astronomer Bill Keir believes Ring makes a genuine attempt at scientific discourse, but either didn't understand the science or changes it to fit with his own theories. Keir published articles in the Auckland Astronomical Society journal that examine and critique Ring's theories.

Ring said that a former client and member of the All Blacks management approached him in 2007 for forecasts on days when the team was playing, reportedly to aid in team selections. Ian Ferguson, a former Olympian and now an events organiser said he consulted with Ring before any big event and had never had to cancel. Ring used similar methods (moon's position and phase) to predict when fish will bite, publishing his predictions in the NZ Fishing World magazine. Ring denied global warming, stating that it is a "politically-motivated power grab by politicians and the far left" and "full of bad science". During the launch of his 2008 almanac, he said that "we have a responsibility to create global warming" as "life likes warmth".

== Earthquake prediction ==
Ring attempted to predict earthquakes based on the orbital position of the Moon. On his website, he said that when the Moon (in particular the new moon) is at perigee (closest to the Earth), it may affect the Earth's mantle and alter the magnetic field. He also suggested that this situation may also draw the Van Allen Belt closer to the Earth, attracting radioactively charged particles towards Earth, though there is no mechanism attributable nor has this phenomenon been observed in reality. Ring believed this combination of New Moon and perigee may be responsible for earthquakes and volcanoes. Ring predicted 221 days of supposed increased earthquake risk for New Zealand in 2011 and more than half of the time between the start of January and the end of March as earthquake risk.

On his weekly Radio Waatea broadcast on 3 September 2010 he said "you’ll be reading about floods and winds and earthquakes and snow over the next week or so, particularly the South Island". Early the next morning, a 7.1 magnitude earthquake struck Christchurch.

On 7 September 2010, he wrote on his website that there would "probably be an east/west faultline event" in Marlborough or north Canterbury "just before noon" on 20 March 2011. The next day he wrote on Twitter, "The Christchurch earthquake was predictable. And there's another coming in 6 months." He directed readers to his website to find out just when it would be. Another two days later, in a Radio Live interview, he told Marcus Lush that "the next one" would be "round about lunchtime on the 20th of March" and that "the South Island is going to be right in the firing line".

The morning of 20 March 2011 sees the South island again in a big earthquake risk for all the same reasons. This date is the closest fly-past the moon does in all of 2011. The node arrives on the 20th at 9.44am. As that date coincides with lunar equinox this will probably be an east/west faultline event this time, and therefore should be more confined to a narrower band of latitude. The only east/west fault lines in NZ are in Marlborough and N Canterbury. All factors should come together for a moon-shot straight through the centre of the earth and targeting NZ. The time will be just before noon. It could be another for the history books.

— Ken Ring, Predict Weather, 7 September 2010

On 14 February 2011, Ring tweeted "Potential earthquake time for the planet between 15th–25th, especially 18th for Christchurch, +/- about 3 days." A deadly 6.3 magnitude aftershock struck Christchurch on 22 February.

Following the earthquakes, Ring received a lot of media attention. John Campbell interviewed Ring on Campbell Live on 28 February and was criticised for being arrogant and not giving Ring a fair chance to speak. Campbell later apologised, but his interview may have unintentionally generated sympathy for Ring. Prior to 20 March 2011, Cabinet minister Nick Smith, who has a PhD in geotechnical engineering, said Ring's predictions were "reckless and irresponsible" and suggested that Ring should be "held to account for his predictions of a further earthquake in Christchurch". Smith added that "the last thing needed by thousands of traumatised people in Canterbury, including elderly and children, is junk science and made-up predictions of future major quakes." Smith described Ring as "scaremongering" and attended a lunch on 20 March at the Sign of the Kiwi, close to the epicentre of 22 February earthquake, organised by the New Zealand Skeptics organisation. After the widespread death and destruction caused by the earlier earthquakes counsellors say his prediction for 20 March terrified "even the most rational" of people. 18 March had been made a special public holiday for Christchurch, and some residents left the city for the three-day weekend of 18–20 March, citing a mix of doubt and concern over the prediction, as well as wishing to have a break from the aftershocks and to take advantage of the long weekend. A 5.1 magnitude aftershock occurred at 9:47 pm (NZDT) on 20 March, and according to his supporters validated Ring's prediction. Scientists contend there is no link with Ring's predictions, and with a quake measuring 5 or higher occurring once every 11 days since 4 September, it was within the range expected in the ongoing aftershock pattern.

David Winter, a PhD student in evolutionary genetics, analysed Ring's predictions and noted that the moon only explains a 2% variation in earthquake activity and wrote that cognitive and hindsight bias are possible reasons for so many people believing his predictions. New Zealand's TV3 news channel says they have not been able to "find a single scientist, geologist or seismologist which believes in Ken Ring's theories". Alison Campbell, a lecturer in science education at the University of Waikato, criticised Ring's predictions for "imprecision", "inconsistencies", and being "vaguely worded", and described Ring as "hedging his bets."

The problem is though, that such vaguely worded 'predictions', with their lack of precision, are so wide open that they lend themselves to confirmation bias. – Alison Campbell, March 2011

One such example of confirmation bias is a Ring prediction from 2011, which was reported in an article in a local Wellington newspaper, the Upper Hutt Leader. On 14 November 2016, Kaikoura and Wellington city experienced a M7.8 earthquake. Ring was quoted in 2011 as saying "I do expect earthquake activity exceeding 7 on the Richter to come about every 11 to 13 years, as they have done in Wellington in February 1893, August 1904, August 1917, July 1929, August 1942, May 1968 and May 1992. As the last in the series of above-7s was in 1992 we can reasonably expect a 7 mag between 2013 and 2016," allowing a full four-year window for an earthquake to occur, making the "prediction" useless.

== Death ==
Ring died on 21 October 2026, at the age of 81, after a short illness.
