= New Zealand Association of Rationalists and Humanists =

Non-profit promoting rathionalism and secular humanism

Logo of the NZARH.

New Zealand Association of Rationalists and Humanists (NZARH) was established in Auckland, New Zealand, in 1927. The Association promotes rationalism and secular humanism principles.

The principal aims are stated as the following:

- To advocate a rational, humane, and secular view of life without reference to supernatural agencies and which is compatible with the scientific method.
- To promote a tolerant, responsible, and open society.
- To encourage open-minded enquiry into matters relevant to human co-existence and well-being.

NZARH is an associate member of the International Humanist and Ethical Union.

== IHEU's Minimum statement on Humanism ==
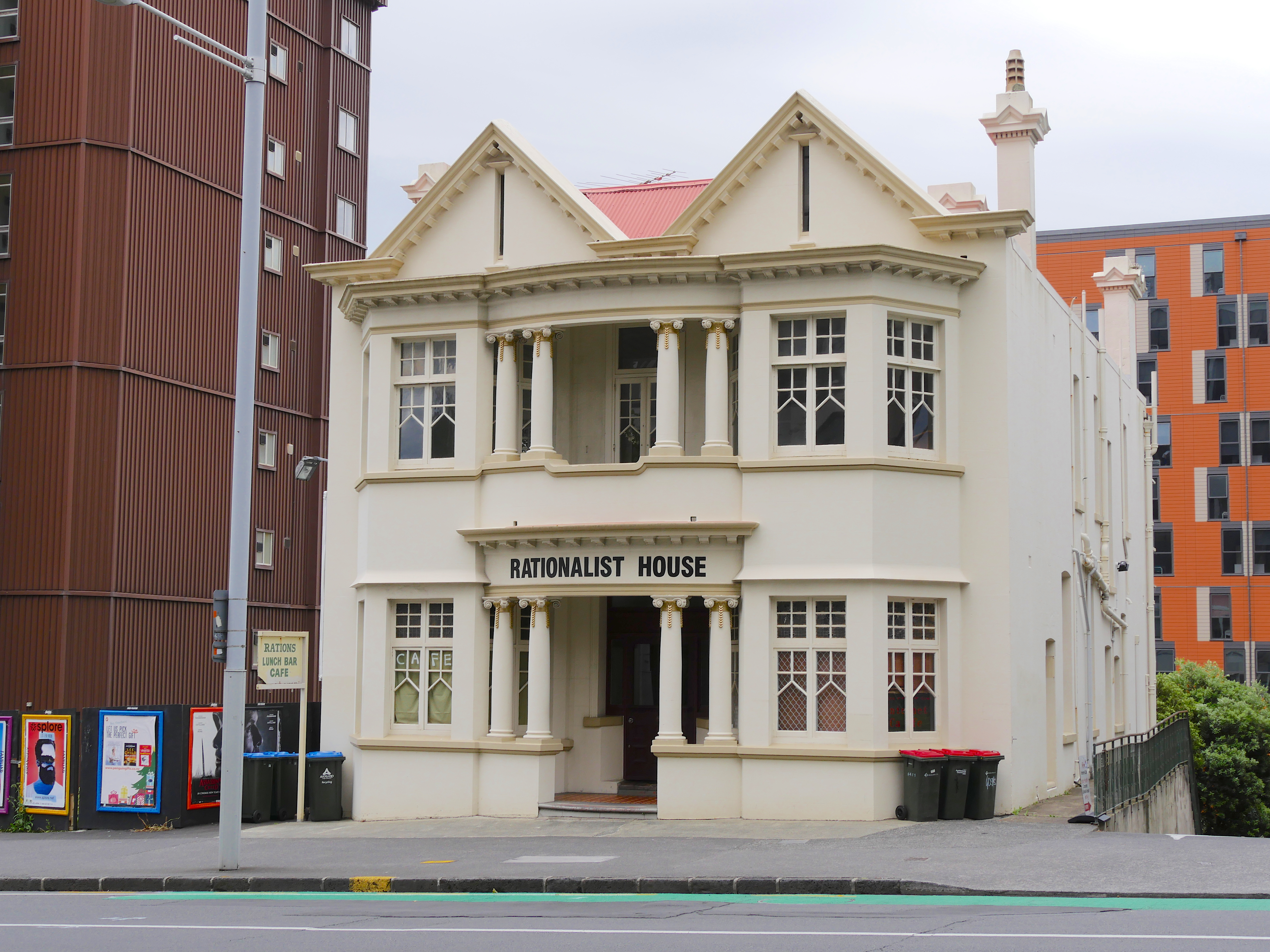
Rationalist House on Symonds Street, Auckland, New Zealand

All member organisations of the IHEU are required by IHEU bylaw 5.1 to accept the IHEU Minimum statement on Humanism:

Humanism is a democratic and ethical life stance, which affirms that human beings have the right and responsibility to give meaning and shape to their own lives. It stands for the building of a more humane society through an ethic based on human and other natural values in the spirit of reason and free inquiry through human capabilities. It is not theistic, and does not accept supernatural views of reality.

== Wellington Humanists ==
Humanist Society of New Zealand
- Formation: 1967
- Founders: Ray Carr, J Beadle, M Geary, D C Worsley
- Type: Nonprofit organisation
- Legal status: Incorporated Society, Registered Charity
- Location: New Zealand
- President: Sara Passmore
- Main organ: Council
- Website: humanist.nz

The Humanist Society of New Zealand (Inc.) was a New Zealand incorporated society founded in 1967 that promoted secular humanist philosophy and ideals. In 2024, the society voted to legally wind up and operate as a regional branch of NZARH under the name Wellington Humanists.

The Society was affiliated internationally to the International Humanist and Ethical Union (IHEU) and in October 2018 hosted the annual General Assembly of the International Humanist and Ethical Union.

Notable members include Frank Dungey, founder of the Voluntary Euthanasia Society of New Zealand, abortion law reform advocate Dr Jim Woolnough, Rhodes Scholar James Dakin, and teacher and peace activist Maureen Hoy.

In 2018 the Humanist Society of New Zealand ran an advertising campaign to encourage people who are not religious to tick the 'no religion" box in the census. The campaign raised concerns, with a bus company refusing to allow the posters to be displayed on their buses.

== Awards ==
In 2000, NZARH was awarded a Bravo award by the New Zealand Skeptics for "issuing a challenge to visiting Australian Ellen Greve, a.k.a. Jasmuheen. She was claimed to have survived only by breathing air and eating nothing."
