= Kaitlin Kratter =

American astronomer

Kaitlin Michelle Kratter is an American astronomer and a professor at the University of Arizona, affiliated with its Department of Astronomy, its graduate interdisciplinary program in applied mathematics, and its Steward Observatory. Her research concerns the formation and gravitational dynamics of multi-star systems, exoplanets, and exoplanets in multi-star systems, through work combining theory, observation, and simulation.

== Education and career ==
Kratter majored in astrophysics at Barnard College, graduating magna cum laude in 2005. She completed her Ph.D. in 2010 in astronomy and astrophysics at the University of Toronto. Her doctoral dissertation, Accretion disks and the formation of stellar systems, was supervised by Christopher Matzner.

She became a postdoctoral researcher in the Institute for Theory and Computation at Harvard University from 2010 until 2012, and subsequently became a Hubble Fellow at JILA at the University of Colorado Boulder from 2012 until 2014. She joined the University of Arizona faculty in 2014, and has been a full professor there since 2024.

== Recognition ==
Kratter was the 2011 recipient of the J.S. Plaskett Medal, an annual award of the Royal Astronomical Society of Canada and the Canadian Astronomical Society for the best doctoral dissertation from a Canadian university. In 2022, the University of Arizona awarded her the Professor Leon and Pauline Blitzer Award for Excellence in the Teaching of Physics and Related Sciences. She is a 2025 recipient of the Presidential Early Career Award for Scientists and Engineers, "for leadership in research about the formation and evolution of stellar and planetary systems beyond our own".
