= Evidence and efficacy of homeopathy =

The infinitesimally low concentration of homeopathic preparations, which often lack even a single molecule of the diluted substance, has been the basis of questions about the effects of the preparations since the 19th century. Modern advocates of homeopathy have proposed a concept of "water memory", according to which water "remembers" the substances mixed in it, and transmits the effect of those substances when consumed. This concept is inconsistent with the current understanding of matter, and water memory has never been demonstrated to exist, in terms of any detectable effect, biological or otherwise.

James Randi and the 10:23 campaign groups have highlighted the lack of active ingredients in most homeopathic products by taking large 'overdoses'. None of the hundreds of demonstrators in the UK, Australia, New Zealand, Canada and the US were injured and "no one was cured of anything, either".

Outside of the alternative medicine community, scientists have long considered homeopathy a sham or a pseudoscience, and the mainstream medical community regards it as quackery. There is an overall absence of sound statistical evidence of therapeutic efficacy, which is consistent with the lack of any biologically plausible pharmacological agent or mechanism.

Abstract concepts within theoretical physics have been invoked to suggest explanations of how or why preparations might work, including quantum entanglement, quantum nonlocality, the theory of relativity and chaos theory. Contrariwise, quantum superposition has been invoked to explain why homeopathy does not work in double-blind trials. However, the explanations are offered by nonspecialists within the field, and often include speculations that are incorrect in their application of the concepts and not supported by actual experiments. Several of the key concepts of homeopathy conflict with fundamental concepts of physics and chemistry. The use of quantum entanglement to explain homeopathy's purported effects is "patent nonsense", as entanglement is a delicate state that rarely lasts longer than a fraction of a second. While entanglement may result in certain aspects of individual subatomic particles acquiring linked quantum states, this does not mean the particles will mirror or duplicate each other, nor cause health-improving transformations.

== Plausibility ==
The proposed mechanisms for homeopathy are precluded from having any effect by the laws of physics and physical chemistry. The extreme dilutions used in homeopathic preparations usually leave not one molecule of the original substance in the final product.

A number of speculative mechanisms have been advanced to counter this, the most widely discussed being water memory, though this is now considered erroneous since short-range order in water only persists for about 1 picosecond. No evidence of stable clusters of water molecules was found when homeopathic preparations were studied using nuclear magnetic resonance, and many other physical experiments in homeopathy have been found to be of low methodological quality, which precludes any meaningful conclusion. Existence of a pharmacological effect in the absence of any true active ingredient is inconsistent with the law of mass action and the observed dose-response relationships characteristic of therapeutic drugs (whereas placebo effects are non-specific and unrelated to pharmacological activity).

Homeopaths contend that their methods produce a therapeutically active preparation, selectively including only the intended substance, though critics note that any water will have been in contact with millions of different substances throughout its history, and homeopaths have not been able to account for a reason why only the selected homeopathic substance would be a special case in their process. For comparison, ISO 3696:1987 defines a standard for water used in laboratory analysis; this allows for a contaminant level of ten parts per billion, 4C in homeopathic notation. This water may not be kept in glass as contaminants will leach out into the water.

Practitioners of homeopathy hold that higher dilutions―described as being of higher potency―produce stronger medicinal effects. This idea is also inconsistent with observed dose-response relationships, where effects are dependent on the concentration of the active ingredient in the body. This dose-response relationship has been confirmed in myriad experiments on organisms as diverse as nematodes, rats, and humans. Some homeopaths contend that the phenomenon of hormesis may support the idea of dilution increasing potency, but the dose-response relationship outside the zone of hormesis declines with dilution as normal, and nonlinear pharmacological effects do not provide any credible support for homeopathy.

Physicist Robert L. Park, former executive director of the American Physical Society, is quoted as saying: "since the least amount of a substance in a solution is one molecule, a 30C solution would have to have at least one molecule of the original substance dissolved in a minimum of 1,000,000,000,000,000,000,000,000,000,000,000,000,000,000,000,000,000,000,000,000 [or 10^{60}] molecules of water. This would require a container more than 30,000,000,000 times the size of the Earth." Park is also quoted as saying that, "to expect to get even one molecule of the 'medicinal' substance allegedly present in 30X pills, it would be necessary to take some two billion of them, which would total about a thousand tons of lactose plus whatever impurities the lactose contained".

The laws of chemistry state that there is a limit to the dilution that can be made without losing the original substance altogether. This limit, which is related to the Avogadro constant, is roughly equal to homeopathic dilutions of 12C or 24X (1 part in 10^{24}).

Scientific tests run by both the BBC's Horizon and ABC's 20/20 programmes were unable to differentiate homeopathic dilutions from water, even when using tests suggested by homeopaths themselves.

In May 2018, the German skeptical organization GWUP issued an invitation to individuals and groups to respond to its challenge "to identify homeopathic preparations in high potency and to give a detailed description on how this can be achieved reproducibly." The first participant to correctly identify selected homeopathic preparations under an agreed-upon protocol will receive €50,000.

== Efficacy ==
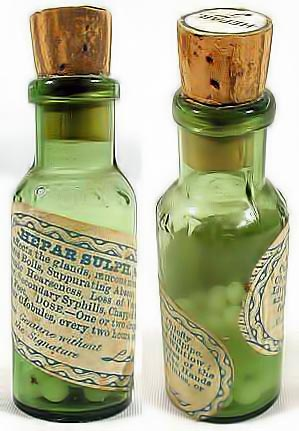
Old bottle of Hepar sulph made from calcium sulfide

No individual homeopathic preparation has been unambiguously shown by research to be different from placebo. The methodological quality of the primary research was generally low, with such problems as weaknesses in study design and reporting, small sample size, and selection bias. Since better quality trials have become available, the evidence for efficacy of homeopathy preparations has diminished; the highest-quality trials indicate that the preparations themselves exert no intrinsic effect. A review conducted in 2010 of all the pertinent studies of "best evidence" produced by the Cochrane Collaboration concluded that "the most reliable evidence – that produced by Cochrane reviews – fails to demonstrate that homeopathic medicines have effects beyond placebo."

=== Government level reviews ===
Government-level reviews have been conducted in recent years by Switzerland (2005), the United Kingdom (2009), Australia (2015) and the European Academies' Science Advisory Council (2017).

The Swiss programme for the evaluation of complementary medicine (PEK) resulted in the peer-reviewed Shang publication (see Systematic reviews and meta-analyses of efficacy) and a controversial competing analysis by homeopaths and advocates led by Gudrun Bornhöft and Peter Matthiessen, which has misleadingly been presented as a Swiss government report by homeopathy proponents, a claim that has been repudiated by the Swiss Federal Office of Public Health. The Swiss Government terminated reimbursement, though it was subsequently reinstated after a political campaign and referendum for a further six-year trial period.

The United Kingdom's House of Commons Science and Technology Committee sought written evidence and submissions from concerned parties and, following a review of all submissions, concluded that there was no compelling evidence of effect other than placebo and recommended that the Medicines and Healthcare products Regulatory Agency (MHRA) should not allow homeopathic product labels to make medical claims, that homeopathic products should no longer be licensed by the MHRA, as they are not medicines, and that further clinical trials of homeopathy could not be justified. They recommended that funding of homeopathic hospitals should not continue, and NHS doctors should not refer patients to homeopaths. By February 2011 only one-third of primary care trusts still funded homeopathy and by 2012 no British universities offered homeopathy courses. In July 2017, as part of a plan to save £200m a year by preventing the "misuse of scarce" funding, the NHS announced that it would no longer provide homeopathic medicines. A legal appeal by the British Homeopathic Association against the decision was rejected in June 2018.

The Australian National Health and Medical Research Council completed a comprehensive review of the effectiveness of homeopathic preparations in 2015, in which it concluded that "there were no health conditions for which there was reliable evidence that homeopathy was effective. No good-quality, well-designed studies with enough participants for a meaningful result reported either that homeopathy caused greater health improvements than placebo, or caused health improvements equal to those of another treatment."

On September 20, 2017, the European Academies' Science Advisory Council (EASAC) published its official analysis and conclusion on the use of homeopathic products, finding a lack of evidence that homeopathic products are effective, and raising concerns about quality control.

=== Publication bias and other methodological problems ===
The fact that individual randomized controlled trials have given positive results is not in contradiction with an overall lack of statistical evidence of efficacy. A small proportion of randomized controlled trials inevitably provide false-positive outcomes due to the play of chance: a statistically significant positive outcome is commonly adjudicated when the probability of it being due to chance rather than a real effect is no more than 5%―a level at which about 1 in 20 tests can be expected to show a positive result in the absence of any therapeutic effect. Furthermore, trials of low methodological quality (i.e. ones that have been inappropriately designed, conducted or reported) are prone to give misleading results. In a systematic review of the methodological quality of randomized trials in three branches of alternative medicine, Linde et al. highlighted major weaknesses in the homeopathy sector, including poor randomization. A separate 2001 systematic review that assessed the quality of clinical trials of homeopathy found that such trials were generally of lower quality than trials of conventional medicine.

A related issue is publication bias: researchers are more likely to submit trials that report a positive finding for publication, and journals prefer to publish positive results. Publication bias has been particularly marked in alternative medicine journals, where few of the published articles (just 5% during the year 2000) tend to report null results. Regarding the way in which homeopathy is represented in the medical literature, a systematic review found signs of bias in the publications of clinical trials (towards negative representation in mainstream medical journals, and vice versa in alternative medicine journals), but not in reviews.

Positive results are much more likely to be false if the prior probability of the claim under test is low.

=== Systematic reviews and meta-analyses of efficacy ===
Both meta-analyses, which statistically combine the results of several randomized controlled trials, and other systematic reviews of the literature are essential tools to summarize evidence of therapeutic efficacy. Early systematic reviews and meta-analyses of trials evaluating the efficacy of homeopathic preparations in comparison with placebo more often tended to generate positive results, but appeared unconvincing overall. In particular, reports of three large meta-analyses warned readers that firm conclusions could not be reached, largely due to methodological flaws in the primary studies and the difficulty in controlling for publication bias. The positive finding of one of the most prominent of the early meta-analyses, published in The Lancet in 1997 by Linde et al., was later reframed by the same research team, who wrote:

The evidence of bias [in the primary studies] weakens the findings of our original meta-analysis. Since we completed our literature search in 1995, a considerable number of new homeopathy trials have been published. The fact that a number of the new high-quality trials ... have negative results, and a recent update of our review for the most "original" subtype of homeopathy (classical or individualized homeopathy), seem to confirm the finding that more rigorous trials have less-promising results. It seems, therefore, likely that our meta-analysis at least overestimated the effects of homeopathic treatments.

Subsequent work by John Ioannidis and others has shown that for treatments with no prior plausibility, the chances of a positive result being a false positive are much higher, and that any result not consistent with the null hypothesis should be assumed to be a false positive.

A systematic review of the available systematic reviews confirmed in 2002 that higher-quality trials tended to have less positive results, and found no convincing evidence that any homeopathic preparation exerts clinical effects different from placebo.

In 2005, The Lancet medical journal published a meta-analysis of 110 placebo-controlled homeopathy trials and 110 matched medical trials based upon the Swiss government's Programme for Evaluating Complementary Medicine, or PEK. The study concluded that its findings were "compatible with the notion that the clinical effects of homeopathy are placebo effects". This was accompanied by an editorial pronouncing "The end of homoeopathy". A 2017 systematic review and meta-analysis found that the most reliable evidence did not support the effectiveness of non-individualized homeopathy. The authors noted that "the quality of the body of evidence is low."

Other meta-analyses include homeopathic treatments to reduce cancer therapy side-effects following radiotherapy and chemotherapy, allergic rhinitis, attention-deficit hyperactivity disorder and childhood diarrhoea, adenoid vegetation, asthma, upper respiratory tract infection in children, insomnia, fibromyalgia, psychiatric conditions and Cochrane Library systematic reviews of homeopathic treatments for asthma, dementia, attention-deficit hyperactivity disorder, induction of labour, upper respiratory tract infections in children, and irritable bowel syndrome. Other reviews covered osteoarthritis, migraines, postoperative ecchymosis and edema, delayed-onset muscle soreness, preventing postpartum haemorrhage, or eczema and other dermatological conditions.

Some clinical trials have tested individualized homeopathy, and there have been reviews of this, specifically. A 1998 review found 32 trials that met their inclusion criteria, 19 of which were placebo-controlled and provided enough data for meta-analysis. These 19 studies showed a pooled odds ratio of 1.17 to 2.23 in favour of individualized homeopathy over the placebo, but no difference was seen when the analysis was restricted to the methodologically best trials. The authors concluded that "the results of the available randomized trials suggest that individualized homeopathy has an effect over placebo. The evidence, however, is not convincing because of methodological shortcomings and inconsistencies." Jay Shelton, author of a book on homeopathy, has stated that the claim assumes without evidence that classical, individualized homeopathy works better than nonclassical variations. A 2014 systematic review and meta-analysis found that individualized homeopathic remedies may be slightly more effective than placebos, though the authors noted that their findings were based on low- or unclear-quality evidence. The same research team later reported that taking into account model validity did not significantly affect this conclusion.

The results of reviews are generally negative or only weakly positive, and reviewers consistently report the poor quality of trials. The finding of Linde et al. that more rigorous studies produce less positive results is supported in several and contradicted by none.

=== Statements by major medical organizations ===
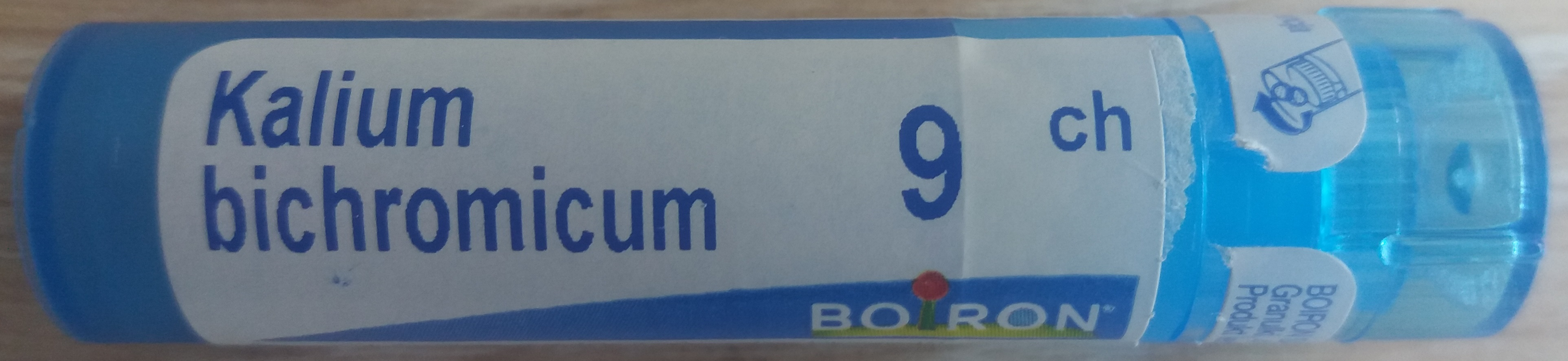
A homeopathic preparation made from potassium dichromate, a chemical compound well known for its toxic and carcinogenic properties

Health organizations such as the UK's National Health Service, the American Medical Association, the FASEB, and the National Health and Medical Research Council of Australia, have issued statements of their conclusion that there is "no good-quality evidence that homeopathy is effective as a treatment for any health condition". In 2009, World Health Organization official Mario Raviglione criticized the use of homeopathy to treat tuberculosis; similarly, another WHO spokesperson argued there was no evidence homeopathy would be an effective treatment for diarrhoea. They warned against the use of homeopathy for serious conditions such as depression, HIV and malaria.

The American College of Medical Toxicology and the American Academy of Clinical Toxicology recommend that no one use homeopathic treatment for disease or as a preventive health measure. These organizations report that no evidence exists that homeopathic treatment is effective, but that there is evidence that using these treatments produces harm and can bring indirect health risks by delaying conventional treatment.

== Explanations of perceived effects ==
Science offers a variety of explanations for how homeopathy may appear to cure diseases or alleviate symptoms even though the preparations themselves are inert:

- The placebo effect – the intensive consultation process and expectations for the homeopathic preparations may cause the effect.
- Therapeutic effect of the consultation – the care, concern, and reassurance a patient experiences when opening up to a compassionate caregiver can have a positive effect on the patient's well-being.
- Unassisted natural healing – time and the body's ability to heal without assistance can eliminate many diseases of their own accord.
- Unrecognized treatments – an unrelated food, exercise, environmental agent, or treatment for a different ailment, may have occurred.
- Regression towards the mean – since many diseases or conditions are cyclical, symptoms vary over time and patients tend to seek care when discomfort is greatest; they may feel better anyway but because of the timing of the visit to the homeopath they attribute improvement to the preparation taken.
- Non-homeopathic treatment – patients may also receive standard medical care at the same time as homeopathic treatment, and the former is responsible for improvement.
- Cessation of unpleasant treatment – often homeopaths recommend patients stop getting medical treatment such as surgery or drugs, which can cause unpleasant side-effects; improvements are attributed to homeopathy when the actual cause is the cessation of the treatment causing side-effects in the first place, but the underlying disease remains untreated and still dangerous to the patient.

== Purported effects in other biological systems ==
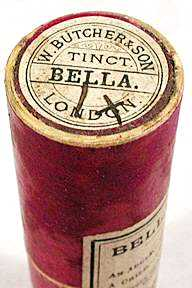
Old homeopathic belladonna preparation

While some articles have suggested that homeopathic solutions of high dilution can have statistically significant effects on organic processes including the growth of grain, histamine release by leukocytes, and enzyme reactions, such evidence is disputed since attempts to replicate them have failed. A 2007 systematic review of high-dilution experiments found that none of the experiments with positive results could be reproduced by all investigators.

In 1987, French immunologist Jacques Benveniste submitted a paper to the journal Nature while working at INSERM. The paper purported to have discovered that basophils, a type of white blood cell, released histamine when exposed to a homeopathic dilution of anti-immunoglobulin E antibody. The journal editors, sceptical of the results, requested that the study be replicated in a separate laboratory. Upon replication in four separate laboratories the study was published. Still sceptical of the findings, Nature assembled an independent investigative team to determine the accuracy of the research, consisting of Nature editor and physicist Sir John Maddox, American scientific fraud investigator and chemist Walter Stewart, and sceptic James Randi. After investigating the findings and methodology of the experiment, the team found that the experiments were "statistically ill-controlled", "interpretation has been clouded by the exclusion of measurements in conflict with the claim", and concluded, "We believe that experimental data have been uncritically assessed and their imperfections inadequately reported." James Randi stated that he doubted that there had been any conscious fraud, but that the researchers had allowed "wishful thinking" to influence their interpretation of the data.

In 2001 and 2004, Madeleine Ennis published a number of studies that reported that homeopathic dilutions of histamine exerted an effect on the activity of basophils. In response to the first of these studies, Horizon aired a programme in which British scientists attempted to replicate Ennis' results; they were unable to do so.

== Ethics and safety ==
The provision of homeopathic preparations has been described as unethical. Michael Baum, Professor Emeritus of Surgery and visiting Professor of Medical Humanities at University College London (UCL), has described homoeopathy as a "cruel deception".

Edzard Ernst, the first professor of complementary medicine in the United Kingdom and a former homeopathic practitioner, has expressed his concerns about pharmacists who violate their ethical code by failing to provide customers with "necessary and relevant information" about the true nature of the homeopathic products they advertise and sell:

"My plea is simply for honesty. Let people buy what they want, but tell them the truth about what they are buying. These treatments are biologically implausible and the clinical tests have shown they don't do anything at all in human beings. The argument that this information is not relevant or important for customers is quite simply ridiculous."

Patients who choose to use homeopathy rather than evidence-based medicine risk missing timely diagnosis and effective treatment of serious conditions such as cancer.

In 2013 the UK Advertising Standards Authority concluded that the Society of Homeopaths were targeting vulnerable ill people and discouraging the use of essential medical treatment while making misleading claims of efficacy for homeopathic products.

In 2015 the Federal Court of Australia imposed penalties on a homeopathic company, Homeopathy Plus! Pty Ltd and its director, for making false or misleading statements about the efficacy of the whooping cough vaccine and homeopathic remedies as an alternative to the whooping cough vaccine, in breach of the Australian Consumer Law.

=== Adverse effects ===
Some homeopathic preparations involve poisons such as Belladonna, arsenic, and poison ivy, which are highly diluted in the homeopathic preparation. In rare cases, the original ingredients are present at detectable levels. This may be due to improper preparation or intentional low dilution. Serious adverse effects such as seizures and death have been reported or associated with some homeopathic preparations.

On September 30, 2016, the FDA issued a safety alert to consumers warning against the use of homeopathic teething gels and tablets following reports of adverse events after their use. The agency recommended that parents discard these products and "seek advice from their health care professional for safe alternatives" to homeopathy for teething. The pharmacy CVS announced, also on September 30, that it was voluntarily withdrawing the products from sale and on October 11 Hyland's (the manufacturer) announced that it was discontinuing their teething medicine in the United States though the products remain on sale in Canada. On October 12, Buzzfeed reported that the regulator had "examined more than 400 reports of seizures, fever and vomiting, as well as 10 deaths" over a six-year period. The investigation (including analyses of the products) is still ongoing and the FDA does not know yet if the deaths and illnesses were caused by the products. However a previous FDA investigation in 2010, following adverse effects reported then, found that these same products were improperly diluted and contained "unsafe levels of belladonna, also known as deadly nightshade" and that the reports of serious adverse events in children using this product were "consistent with belladonna toxicity".

Instances of arsenic poisoning have occurred after use of arsenic-containing homeopathic preparations. Zicam Cold remedy Nasal Gel, which contains 2X (1:100) zinc gluconate, reportedly caused a small percentage of users to lose their sense of smell; 340 cases were settled out of court in 2006 for US$12 million. In 2009, the FDA advised consumers to stop using three discontinued cold remedy Zicam products because it could cause permanent damage to users' sense of smell. Zicam was launched without a New Drug Application (NDA) under a provision in the FDA's Compliance Policy Guide called "Conditions under which homeopathic drugs may be marketed" (CPG 7132.15), but the FDA warned Matrixx Initiatives, its manufacturer, via a Warning Letter that this policy does not apply when there is a health risk to consumers.

A 2000 review by homeopaths reported that homeopathic preparations are "unlikely to provoke severe adverse reactions". In 2012, a systematic review evaluating evidence of homeopathy's possible adverse effects concluded that "homeopathy has the potential to harm patients and consumers in both direct and indirect ways". One of the reviewers, Edzard Ernst, supplemented the article on his blog, writing: "I have said it often and I say it again: if used as an alternative to an effective cure, even the most 'harmless' treatment can become life-threatening." A 2016 systematic review and meta-analysis found that, in homeopathic clinical trials, adverse effects were reported among the patients who received homeopathy about as often as they were reported among patients who received placebo or conventional medicine.

=== Lack of efficacy ===
The lack of convincing scientific evidence supporting its efficacy and its use of preparations without active ingredients have led to characterizations as pseudoscience and quackery, or, in the words of a 1998 medical review, "placebo therapy at best and quackery at worst". The Russian Academy of Sciences considers homeopathy a "dangerous 'pseudoscience' that does not work", and "urges people to treat homeopathy 'on a par with magic'". The Chief Medical Officer for England, Dame Sally Davies, has stated that homeopathic preparations are "rubbish" and do not serve as anything more than placebos. Jack Killen, acting deputy director of the National Center for Complementary and Alternative Medicine, says homeopathy "goes beyond current understanding of chemistry and physics". He adds: "There is, to my knowledge, no condition for which homeopathy has been proven to be an effective treatment." Ben Goldacre says that homeopaths who misrepresent scientific evidence to a scientifically illiterate public, have "... walled themselves off from academic medicine, and critique has been all too often met with avoidance rather than argument". Homeopaths often prefer to ignore meta-analyses in favour of cherry picked positive results, such as by promoting a particular observational study (one which Goldacre describes as "little more than a customer-satisfaction survey") as if it were more informative than a series of randomized controlled trials.

Referring specifically to homeopathy, the British House of Commons Science and Technology Committee has stated:

In our view, the systematic reviews and meta-analyses conclusively demonstrate that homeopathic products perform no better than placebos. The Government shares our interpretation of the evidence.

In the Committee's view, homeopathy is a placebo treatment and the Government should have a policy on prescribing placebos. The Government is reluctant to address the appropriateness and ethics of prescribing placebos to patients, which usually relies on some degree of patient deception. Prescribing of placebos is not consistent with an informed patient choice – which the Government claims is very important – as it means patients do not have all the information needed to make choice meaningful. Beyond ethical issues and the integrity of the doctor-patient relationship, prescribing pure placebos is bad medicine. Their effect is unreliable and unpredictable and cannot form the sole basis of any treatment on the NHS.

The National Center for Complementary and Alternative Medicine of the United States' National Institutes of Health states:

Homeopathy is a controversial topic in complementary medicine research. A number of the key concepts of homeopathy are not consistent with fundamental concepts of chemistry and physics. For example, it is not possible to explain in scientific terms how a preparation containing little or no active ingredient can have any effect. This, in turn, creates major challenges to the rigorous clinical investigation of homeopathic preparations. For example, one cannot confirm that an extremely dilute preparation contains what is listed on the label, or develop objective measures that show effects of extremely dilute preparations in the human body.

Ben Goldacre noted that in the early days of homeopathy, when medicine was dogmatic and frequently worse than doing nothing, homeopathy at least failed to make matters worse:

During the 19th-century cholera epidemic, death rates at the London Homeopathic Hospital were three times lower than at the Middlesex Hospital. Homeopathic sugar pills won't do anything against cholera, of course, but the reason for homeopathy's success in this epidemic is even more interesting than the placebo effect: at the time, nobody could treat cholera. So, while hideous medical treatments such as blood-letting were actively harmful, the homeopaths' treatments at least did nothing either way.

=== In lieu of standard medical treatment ===
On clinical grounds, patients who choose to use homeopathy in preference to normal medicine risk missing timely diagnosis and effective treatment, thereby worsening the outcomes of serious conditions. Critics of homeopathy have cited individual cases of patients of homeopathy failing to receive proper treatment for diseases that could have been easily diagnosed and managed with conventional medicine and who have died as a result, and the "marketing practice" of criticizing and downplaying the effectiveness of mainstream medicine. Homeopaths claim that use of conventional medicines will "push the disease deeper" and cause more serious conditions, a process referred to as "suppression". Some homeopaths (particularly those who are non-physicians) advise their patients against immunization. Some homeopaths suggest that vaccines be replaced with homeopathic "nosodes", created from biological materials such as pus, diseased tissue, bacilli from sputum or (in the case of "bowel nosodes") faeces. While Hahnemann was opposed to such preparations, modern homeopaths often use them although there is no evidence to indicate they have any beneficial effects. Cases of homeopaths advising against the use of anti-malarial drugs have been identified. This puts visitors to the tropics who take this advice in severe danger, since homeopathic preparations are completely ineffective against the malaria parasite. Also, in one case in 2004, a homeopath instructed one of her patients to stop taking conventional medication for a heart condition, advising her on June 22, 2004, to "Stop ALL medications including homeopathic", advising her on or around August 20 that she no longer needed to take her heart medication, and adding on August 23, "She just cannot take ANY drugs – I have suggested some homeopathic remedies ... I feel confident that if she follows the advice she will regain her health." The patient was admitted to hospital the next day, and died eight days later, the final diagnosis being "acute heart failure due to treatment discontinuation".

In 1978, Anthony Campbell, then a consultant physician at the Royal London Homeopathic Hospital, criticized statements by George Vithoulkas claiming that syphilis, when treated with antibiotics, would develop into secondary and tertiary syphilis with involvement of the central nervous system, saying that "The unfortunate layman might well be misled by Vithoulkas' rhetoric into refusing orthodox treatment". Vithoulkas' claims echo the idea that treating a disease with external medication used to treat the symptoms would only drive it deeper into the body and conflict with scientific studies, which indicate that penicillin treatment produces a complete cure of syphilis in more than 90% of cases.

A 2006 review by W. Steven Pray of the College of Pharmacy at Southwestern Oklahoma State University recommends that pharmacy colleges include a required course in unproven medications and therapies, that ethical dilemmas inherent in recommending products lacking proven safety and efficacy data be discussed, and that students should be taught where unproven systems such as homeopathy depart from evidence-based medicine.

In an article entitled "Should We Maintain an Open Mind about Homeopathy?" published in the American Journal of Medicine, Michael Baum and Edzard Ernst – writing to other physicians – wrote that "Homeopathy is among the worst examples of faith-based medicine... These axioms [of homeopathy] are not only out of line with scientific facts but also directly opposed to them. If homeopathy is correct, much of physics, chemistry, and pharmacology must be incorrect...".

In 2013, Mark Walport, the UK Government Chief Scientific Adviser and head of the Government Office for Science, had this to say: "My view scientifically is absolutely clear: homoeopathy is nonsense, it is non-science. My advice to ministers is clear: that there is no science in homoeopathy. The most it can have is a placebo effect – it is then a political decision whether they spend money on it or not." His predecessor, John Beddington, referring to his views on homeopathy being "fundamentally ignored" by the Government, said: "The only one [view being ignored] I could think of was homoeopathy, which is mad. It has no underpinning of scientific basis. In fact, all the science points to the fact that it is not at all sensible. The clear evidence is saying this is wrong, but homoeopathy is still used on the NHS."
