= Cease =

Cease may refer to:

- CEASE therapy, a purported treatment for autism
- Cease (surname), a surname
