= James Tyler Kent =

American physician (1849–1916)

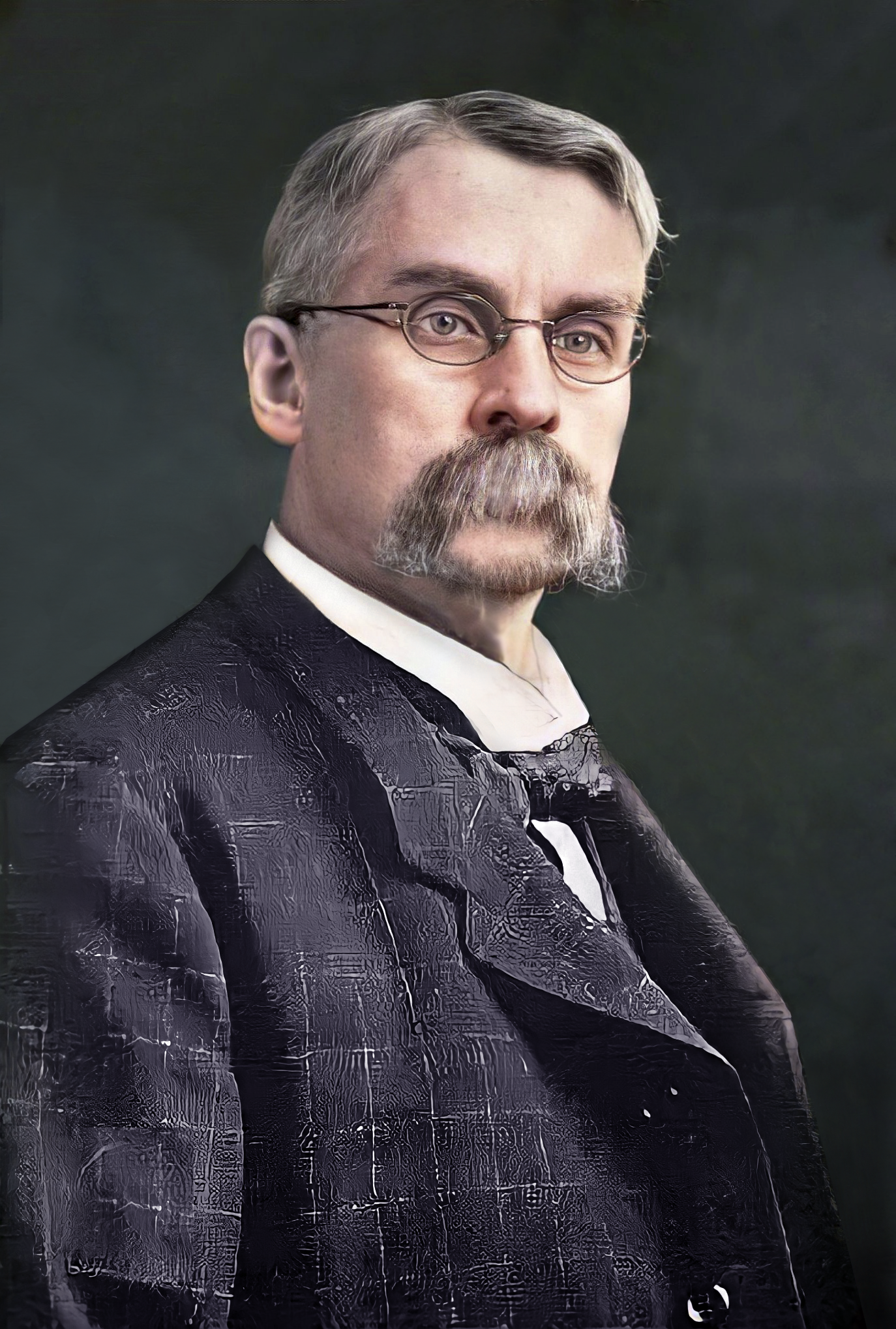
James Tyler Kent (1849-1916)

James Tyler Kent (1849–1916) was an American physician best remembered as a forefather of modern homeopathy. In 1897 Kent published a massive guidebook on human physical and mental disease symptoms and their associated pseudoscientific homeopathic preparations entitled Repertory of the Homeopathic Materia Medica, which has been translated into a number of languages. It has been the blueprint to many modern repertories used throughout the world and even remains in use by some homeopathic practitioners today.

== Life and career ==
=== Early years ===
James Tyler Kent was born on March 31, 1849, in Woodhull, New York, the son of Steven Kent and his wife Caroline Tyler. Kent was raised as a staunch Baptist.

Kent attended secondary school at the Franklin Academy of Prattsburgh, New York before enrolling at Madison University (today's Colgate University), from which he was graduated with a bachelor's degree in 1868. He earned a master's degree from the same institution in 1870.

Kent attended the Institute of Eclectic Medicine at Cincinnati, Ohio, where, in addition to standard medicine, he studied naturopathy, homeopathy, and chiropractic. Kent graduated from the institute in 1873.

=== Career ===
In 1874, Kent married Ellen and settled in St. Louis, Missouri, where he took up medical practice. His wife died shortly after marriage at the age of 19. He set up practice as an eclectic physician in St Louis, Missouri and soon became a distinguished member of the Eclectic National Medical Association. He took a post as a professor of anatomy at American College in St. Louis two years later.

In 1878, Kent's second wife, Lucy, became ill. In spite of Lucy's symptoms of "nervous weakness, insomnia, and anaemia" being treated by both orthodox and eclectic physicians, her condition continued to deteriorate and she was bedridden for months. On Dr.Kent's wife's request Dr Richard Phelan a homoeopathic physician, was called in to see Lucy. Following his prescription, she made a dramatic recovery. As a result, Kent elected to study with Phelan and changed from eclecticism to homoeopathy.

It was at this time that he became a fervent adherent of the precepts of homeopathy, a branch of alternative medicine that purports to treat patients through the administration of "remedies" containing massively diluted forms of substances that, if given to a healthy person would supposedly cause symptoms similar to the disease. It is believed by homeopaths that the introduction of such "similars" into the body effectively stimulates it to defeat the ailment or disease.

In 1881, Kent accepted a position as professor of anatomy at the Homeopathic College of Missouri, an institution with which he remained affiliated until 1888. During this period, Kent's second wife died.

In 1890, Kent moved to Pennsylvania to take a position as Dean of Professors at the Post-Graduate Homeopathic Medical School of Philadelphia. He remained in that position until 1899.

Clara Louis Tobey, a doctor turned homoeopath, was treated by Dr. Kent and she later on became his wife and she helped him in completing his famous works which were published.

In 1897 Kent published his magnum opus, Repertory of the Homœopathic Materia Medica. This guidebook to ailments and their associated "similars" remains the repertory on which much of the modern practice of homeopathy is based.

Kent edited the Journal of Homeopathics from 1897 to 1903, producing seven volumes of the journal.

Kent moved to Chicago in 1903, where he taught at Hahnemann Medical College. Kent remained at that post until his departure in 1909 to become professor and Dean of Hering Medical College and Hospital, an institution also located in Chicago.

In November 1910, Kent was instrumental in the establishment of the Society of Homeopathicians as a means of disseminating the principles of homeopathy promulgated by Hahnemann. The group published its own journal, The Homeopathician.

Kent wrote voluminously and his works were published into several non-English languages during the course of his life. He gained a significant number of adherents in India, a country in which several publishers of his work of the late 20th and early 21st centuries are located.

=== Ideas ===
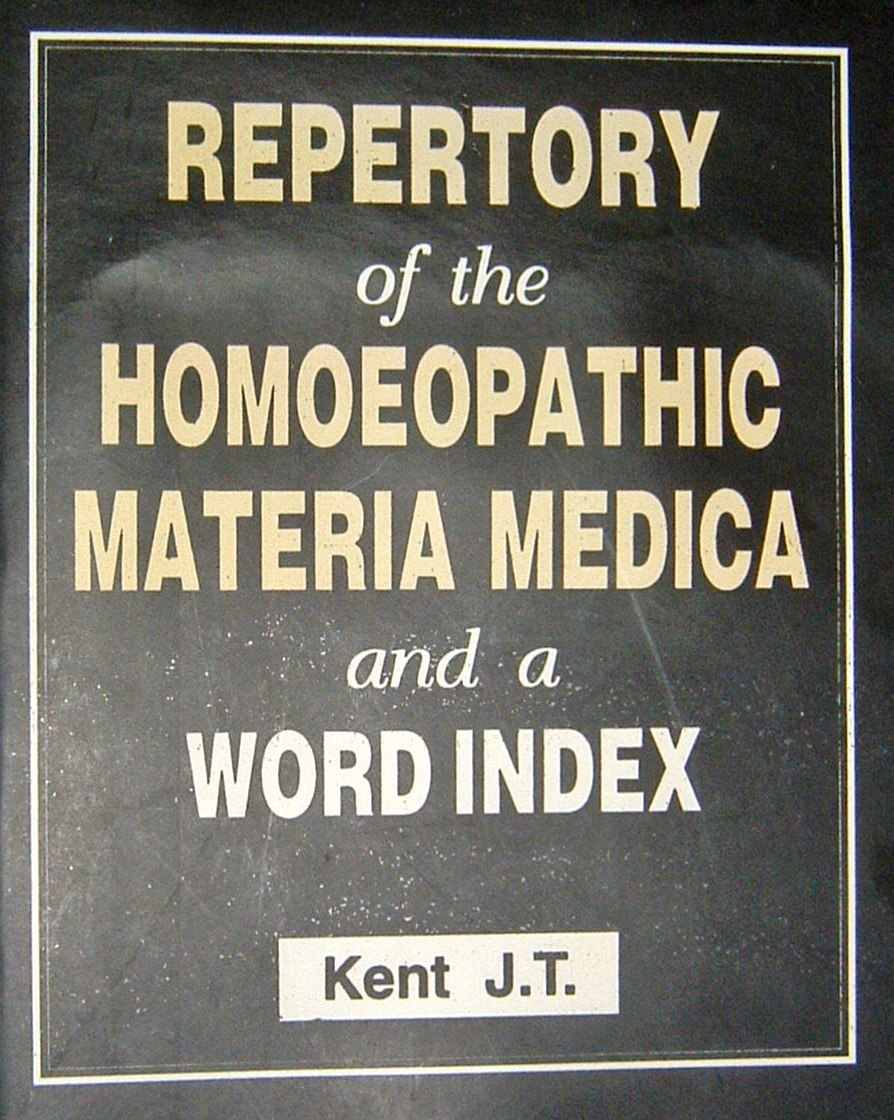
Cover of a recent Indian edition of the Homeopathic Repertory by James Tyler Kent

Kent is remembered for his arguments against the germ theory of disease.

The microbe is not the cause of disease. We should not be carried away by these idle allopathic dreams and vain imaginations but should correct the Élan vital.

The bacteria is an innocent feller, and if he carries disease he carries the Simple Substance which causes disease, just as an elephant would.

As a follower of a mystical Christian religious sect headed by Emanuel Swedenborg, Kent believed that illness had spiritual causes:

"You cannot divorce medicine and theology. Man exists all the way down from his innermost spiritual, to his outermost natural."[12]

Kent was a vitalist and believer in a "vital force".

=== Death and legacy ===
Kent died of Bright's disease on June 5, 1916, in Stevensville, Montana. He was 67 years old at the time of his death.

Not long after his death, Kent was eulogized by one contemporary as

Genial, gentle, devoted friend to his patients and pupils; jealous guardian of pure Homeopathy against the criticisms of those whom he considered his enemies; sensitive, embittered, retiring man in later years as he thought one after another did him wrong...; most of his patients and pupils were devoted to him and he basked in the sunshine of that devotion.

British homeopath Francis Treuherz has characterized James Tyler Kent as "the ultimate homeopath of the period when homeopathy flourished in America." Treuherz noted Kent's pioneering use of extremely high dilutions, called "high potencies" by adherents of homeopathy, and "meticulous scholarship in the creation of his repertory" as among Kent's primary attributes as the homeopathic exemplar of his generation.

== Works ==
- Sexual Neuroses. St. Louis, MO: Maynard and Tedford, 1879.
- Address before the International Hahnemannian Association at Its Seventh Annual Meeting. 1887.
- Repertory of the Homœopathic Materia Medica. Lancaster, PA: Examiner Printing House, 1897.
- Lectures on Homoeopathic Philosophy. [1900] Memorial Edition. Chicago: Ehrhart and Karl, 1919.
- Lectures on Homoeopathic Materia Medica. Philadelphia: Boericke & Tafel, 1905.
- New remedies, clinical cases, lesser writings, aphorisms and precepts New Remedies, Clinical Cases, Lesser Writings, Aphorisms and Precepts]. Chicago: Ehrhart and Karl, 1926.
