= Homeopathy =

Pseudoscientific system of alternative medicine

Alternative medicine
- Homoeopathy
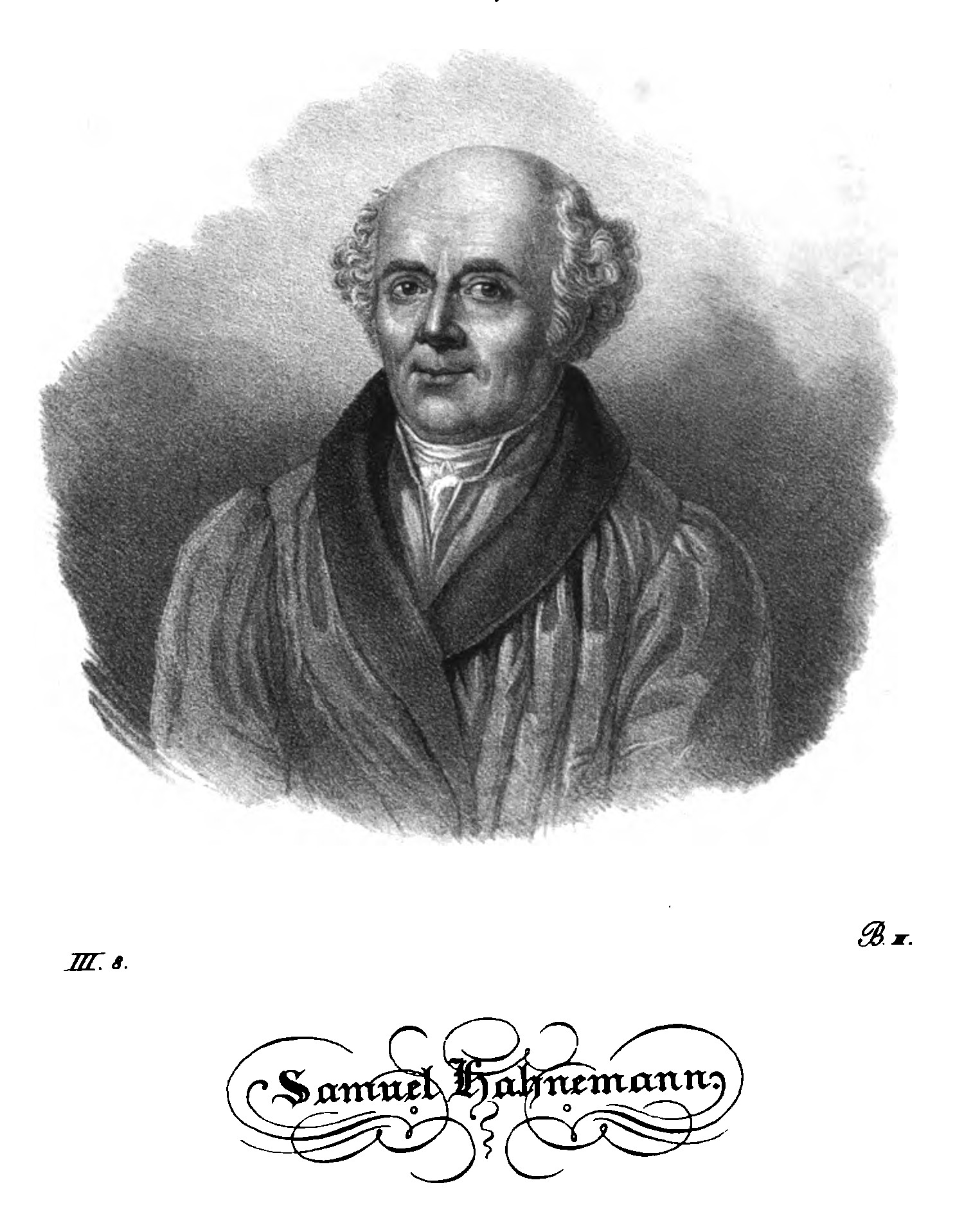
- Samuel Hahnemann, originator of homeopathy
- Pronunciation: /ˌhoʊmiˈɒpəθi/
- Claims: "Like cures like", dilution increases potency, disease caused by miasms
- Related fields: Alternative medicine
- Original proponents: Samuel Hahnemann
- Subsequent proponents: James Tyler Kent; Royal S. Copeland; George Vithoulkas
- MeSH: D006705
- See also: Humorism, heroic medicine

Homeopathy or homoeopathy is a pseudoscientific (Note: Attributed to multiple references:) system of alternative medicine. Its practitioners, called homeopaths or homeopathic physicians, believe that a substance that causes symptoms of a disease in healthy people can cure similar symptoms in sick people; this doctrine is called similia similibus curentur, or "like cures like". It was conceived in 1796 by the German physician Samuel Hahnemann.

Homeopathic preparations are termed remedies and are made using homeopathic dilution. In this process, the selected substance is repeatedly diluted until the final product is indistinguishable from the diluent. Often not even a single molecule of the original substance can be expected to remain in the product. Between each dilution homeopaths may hit and/or shake the product, claiming this makes the diluent "remember" the original substance after its removal. Practitioners claim that such preparations, upon oral intake, can treat or cure disease. All relevant scientific knowledge about physics, chemistry, biochemistry and biology contradicts homeopathy. (Note: Attributed to multiple references:) Homeopathic remedies are typically biochemically inert, and have no effect on any known disease. Homeopathy's theory of disease, centered around principles Hahnemann termed miasms, is inconsistent with subsequent identification of viruses and bacteria as causes of disease. Clinical trials have been conducted and generally demonstrated no objective effect from homeopathic preparations. The fundamental implausibility of homeopathy as well as a lack of demonstrable effectiveness has led to it being characterized within the scientific and medical communities as quackery and fraud.

Homeopathy achieved its greatest popularity in the 19th century. It was introduced to the United States in 1825, and the first American homeopathic school opened in 1835. Throughout the 19th century, dozens of homeopathic institutions appeared in Europe and the United States. During this period, homeopathy was able to appear relatively successful, as other forms of treatment could be harmful and ineffective. By the end of the century the practice began to wane, with the last exclusively homeopathic medical school in the United States closing in 1920. During the 1970s, homeopathy made a significant comeback, with sales of some homeopathic products increasing tenfold. The trend corresponded with the rise of the New Age movement, and may be in part due to chemophobia, an irrational aversion to synthetic chemicals, and the longer consultation times homeopathic practitioners provided.

In the 21st century, a series of meta-analyses have shown that the therapeutic claims of homeopathy lack scientific justification. As a result, national and international bodies have recommended the withdrawal of government funding for homeopathy in healthcare. National bodies from Australia, the United Kingdom, Switzerland and France, as well as the European Academies' Science Advisory Council and the Russian Academy of Sciences have all concluded that homeopathy is ineffective, and recommended against the practice receiving any further funding. The National Health Service in England no longer provides funding for homeopathic remedies and asked the Department of Health to add homeopathic remedies to the list of forbidden prescription items. France removed funding in 2021, while Spain has also announced moves to ban homeopathy and other pseudotherapies from health centers.

== History ==
Homeopathy was created in 1796 by Samuel Hahnemann. Hahnemann rejected the mainstream medicine of the late 18th century as irrational and inadvisable, because it was largely ineffective and often harmful. He advocated the use of single drugs at lower doses and promoted an immaterial, vitalistic view of how living organisms function. The term homeopathy was coined by Hahnemann and first appeared in print in 1807. He also coined the expression "allopathic medicine", which was used to pejoratively refer to traditional Western medicine.

=== Concept ===
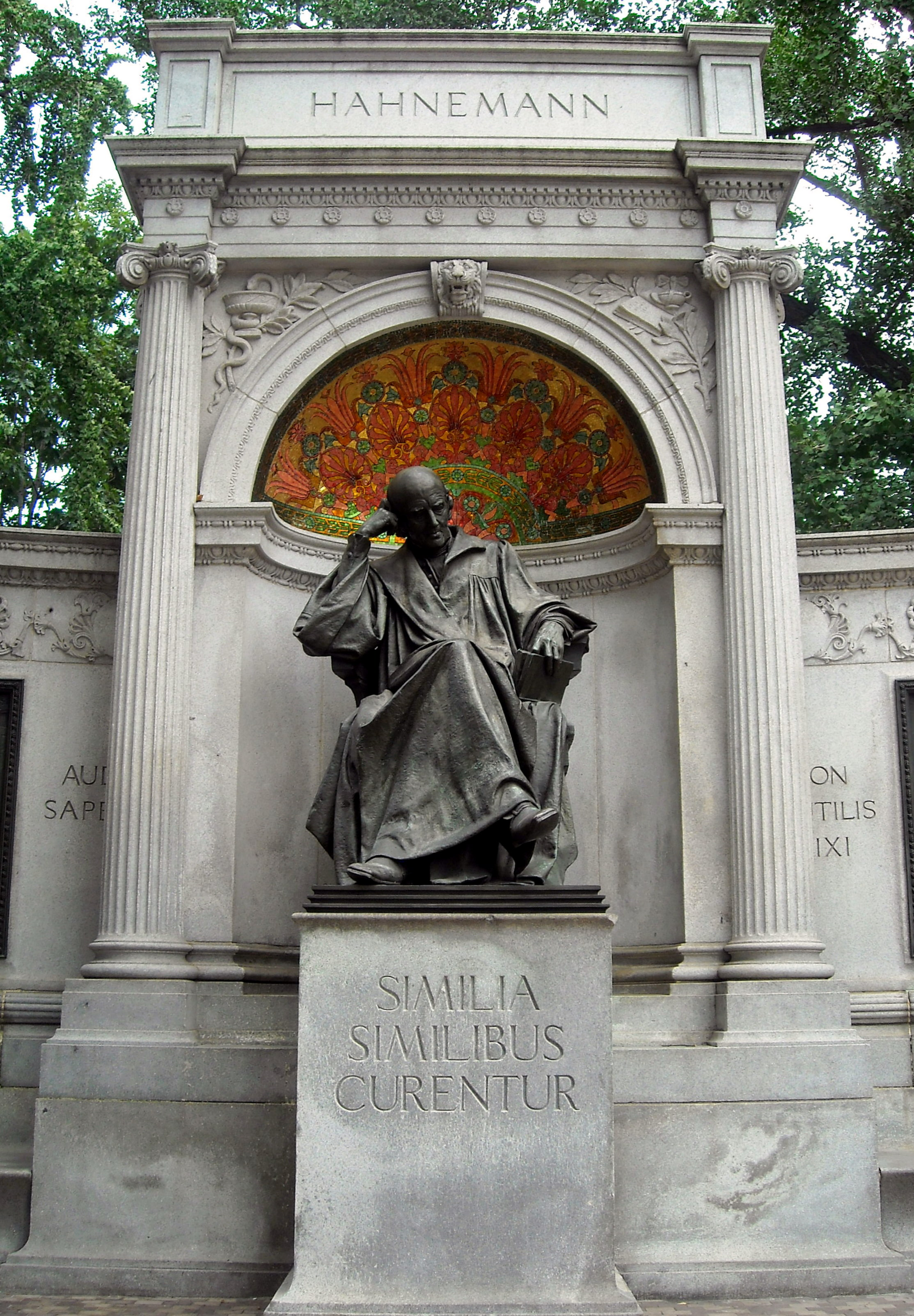
Samuel Hahnemann Monument, Washington, D.C., with the inscription Similia Similibus Curentur – "Like cures Like"

Hahnemann conceived of homeopathy while translating a medical treatise by the Scottish physician and chemist William Cullen into German. Being sceptical of Cullen's theory that cinchona cured malaria because it was bitter, Hahnemann ingested some bark specifically to investigate what would happen. He experienced fever, shivering and joint pain: symptoms similar to those of malaria itself. From this, Hahnemann came to believe that all effective drugs produce symptoms in healthy individuals similar to those of the diseases that they treat. This led to the name "homeopathy", which comes from the Ancient Greek: ὅμοιος hómoios, "-like" and πάθος páthos, "suffering".

The doctrine that those drugs are effective which produce symptoms similar to the symptoms caused by the diseases they treat, called "the law of similars", was expressed by Hahnemann with the Latin phrase similia similibus curentur, or "like cures like". Hahnemann's law of similars is unproven and does not derive from the scientific method. An account of the effects of eating cinchona bark noted by Oliver Wendell Holmes, published in 1861, failed to reproduce the symptoms Hahnemann reported. Subsequent scientific work showed that cinchona cures malaria because it contains quinine, which kills the Plasmodium falciparum parasite that causes the disease; the mechanism of action is unrelated to Hahnemann's ideas.

==== Provings ====
Hahnemann began to test what effects various substances may produce in humans, a procedure later called "homeopathic proving". These tests required subjects to test the effects of ingesting substances by recording all their symptoms as well as the ancillary conditions under which they appeared. He published a collection of provings in 1805, and a second collection of 65 preparations appeared in his book, Materia Medica Pura (1810).

Modern historians of medicine have noted that Hahnemann's provings relied primarily on subjective self-reported symptoms, a methodology that differed substantially from later standards of controlled clinical investigation.

As Hahnemann believed that large doses of drugs that caused similar symptoms would only aggravate illness, he advocated for extreme dilutions. A technique was devised for making dilutions that Hahnemann claimed would preserve the substance's therapeutic properties while removing its harmful effects. Hahnemann believed that this process enhanced "the spirit-like medicinal powers of the crude substances". He gathered and published an overview of his new medical system in his book, The Organon of the Healing Art (1810), with a sixth edition published in 1921 that homeopaths still use today.

==== Miasms and disease ====
In the Organon, Hahnemann introduced the concept of "miasms" as the "infectious principles" underlying chronic disease and as "peculiar morbid derangement[s] of vital force". Hahnemann associated each miasm with specific diseases, and thought that initial exposure to miasms causes local symptoms, such as skin or venereal diseases. His assertion was that if these symptoms were suppressed by medication, the cause went deeper and began to manifest itself as diseases of the internal organs. Homeopathy maintains that treating diseases by directly alleviating their symptoms, as is sometimes done in conventional medicine, is ineffective because all "disease can generally be traced to some latent, deep-seated, underlying chronic, or inherited tendency". The underlying imputed miasm still remains, and deep-seated ailments can be corrected only by removing the deeper disturbance of the vital force.

Hahnemann's hypotheses for miasms originally presented only three local symptoms: psora (the itch), syphilis (venereal disease) or sycosis (fig-wart disease). Of these the most important was psora, described as being related to any itching diseases of the skin and was claimed to be the foundation of many further disease conditions. Hahnemann believed it to be the cause of such diseases as epilepsy, cancer, jaundice, deafness, and cataracts. Since Hahnemann's time, other miasms have been proposed, some replacing illnesses previously attributed to the psora, including tuberculosis and cancer miasms.

Hahnemann's miasm theory remains disputed and controversial within homeopathy even in modern times. The theory of miasms has been criticized as an explanation developed to preserve the system of homeopathy in the face of treatment failures, and for being inadequate to cover the many hundreds of sorts of diseases, as well as for failing to explain disease predispositions, as well as genetics, environmental factors, and the unique disease history of each patient.

=== 19th century: rise to popularity and early criticism ===
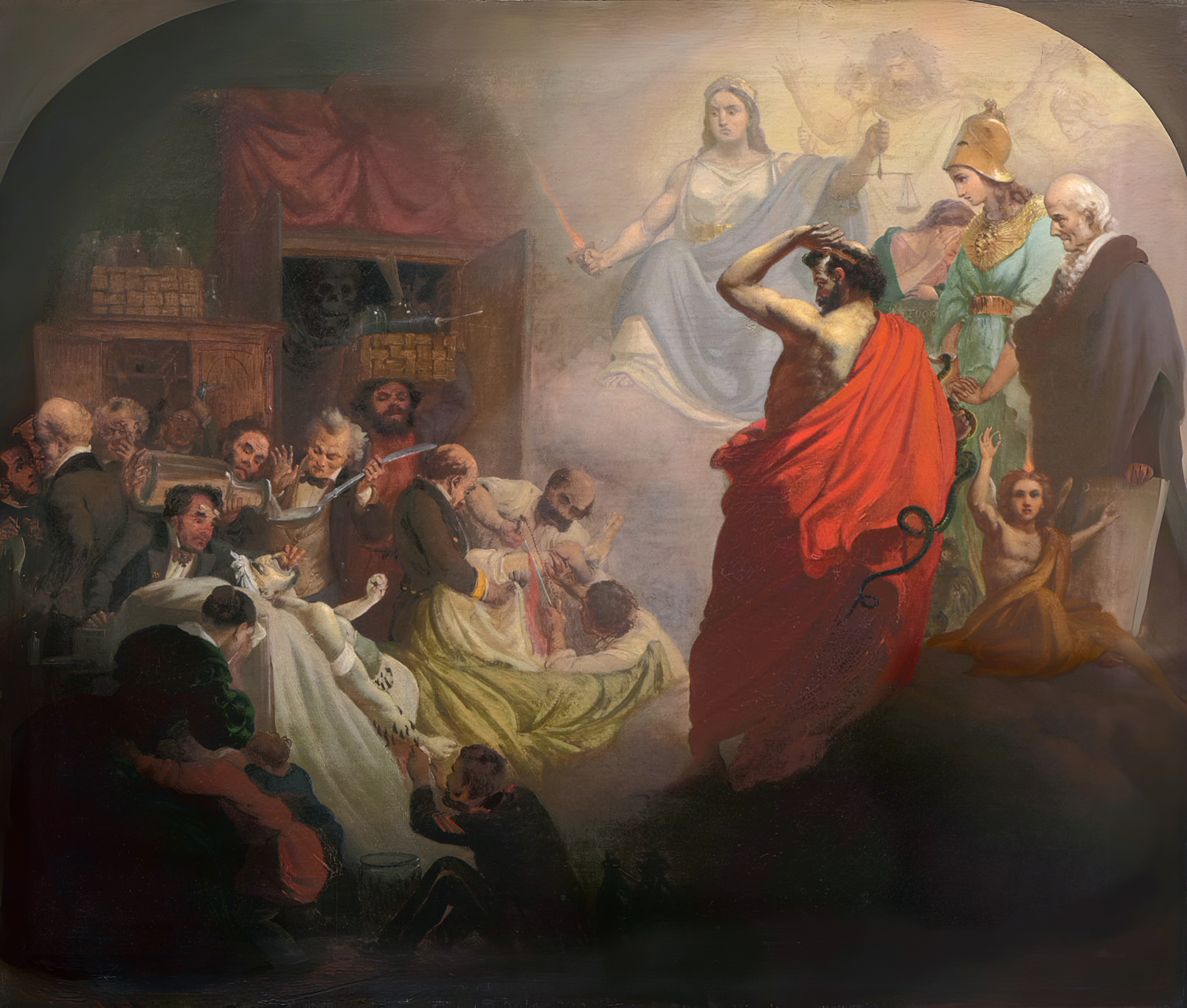
Homeopathy Looks at the Horrors of Allopathy, an 1857 painting by Alexander Beydeman, showing historical figures and personifications of homeopathy observing the brutality of medicine of the 19th century

Homeopathy achieved its greatest popularity in the 19th century. It was introduced to the United States in 1825 by Hans Birch Gram, a student of Hahnemann. The first homeopathic school in the United States opened in 1835 and the American Institute of Homeopathy was established in 1844. Throughout the 19th century, dozens of homeopathic institutions appeared in Europe and the United States, and by 1900, there were 22 homeopathic colleges and 15,000 practitioners in the United States.

Because medical practice of the time relied on treatments which were often ineffective and harmful, patients of homeopaths often had better outcomes than those being treated by medical practitioners. Though ineffective, homeopathic preparations are rarely detrimental, thus users were less likely to be harmed by the treatment that was supposed to be helping them. The relative success of homeopathy in the 19th century may have led to the abandonment of the ineffective and harmful treatments of bloodletting and purging and begun the move towards more effective, science-based medicine. One reason for the growing popularity of homeopathy was its apparent success in treating people suffering from infectious disease epidemics. During 19th-century epidemics of diseases such as cholera, death rates in homeopathic hospitals were often lower than in conventional hospitals, where the treatments used at the time were often harmful and did little or nothing to combat the diseases.

Even during its rise in popularity, homeopathy was criticized by scientists and physicians. Sir John Forbes, physician to Queen Victoria, said in 1843 that the extremely small doses of homeopathy were regularly derided as useless and considered it "an outrage to human reason". James Young Simpson said in 1853 of the highly diluted drugs: "No poison, however strong or powerful, the billionth or decillionth of which would in the least degree affect a man or harm a fly." Nineteenth-century American physician and author Oliver Wendell Holmes was also a vocal critic of homeopathy and published an essay entitled Homœopathy and Its Kindred Delusions (1842). The members of the French Homeopathic Society observed in 1867 that some leading homeopaths of Europe not only were abandoning the practice of administering infinitesimal doses but were also no longer defending it. The last school in the United States exclusively teaching homeopathy closed in 1920.

=== Revival in the 20th century ===
According to academics Paul U. Unschuld and Edzard Ernst, the Nazi regime in Germany was fond of homeopathy, and spent large sums of money on researching its mechanisms, but without gaining a positive result. Unschuld also states that homeopathy never subsequently took root in the United States, but remained more deeply established in European thinking. In the United States, the Food, Drug, and Cosmetic Act of 1938 (sponsored by Royal Copeland, a Senator from New York and homeopathic physician) recognized homeopathic preparations as drugs. In the 1950s, there were only 75 solely homeopathic practitioners in the U.S. By the mid to late 1970s, homeopathy made a significant comeback and the sales of some homeopathic companies increased tenfold.

Some homeopaths credit the revival to Greek homeopath George Vithoulkas, who conducted a "great deal of research to update the scenarios and refine the theories and practice of homeopathy" in the 1970s, but Ernst and Simon Singh consider it to be linked to the rise of the New Age movement. Bruce Hood has argued that the increased popularity of homeopathy in recent times may be due to the comparatively long consultations practitioners are willing to give their patients, and to a preference for "natural" products, which people think are the basis of homeopathic preparations.

Towards the end of the century, opposition to homeopathy began to increase again, with William T. Jarvis, the President of the National Council Against Health Fraud, saying that "Homeopathy is a fraud perpetrated on the public with the government's blessing, thanks to the abuse of political power of Sen. Royal S. Copeland."

=== 21st century: renewed criticism ===
Since the beginning of the 21st century, a series of meta-analyses have further shown that the therapeutic claims of homeopathy lack scientific justification. This had led to a decrease or suspension of funding by many governments. In a 2010 report, the Science and Technology Committee of the United Kingdom House of Commons recommended that homeopathy should no longer receive National Health Service (NHS) funding due its lack of scientific credibility; NHS funding for homeopathy ceased in 2017. They also asked the Department of Health in the UK to add homeopathic remedies to the list of forbidden prescription items.

In 2015, the National Health and Medical Research Council of Australia found that "there are no health conditions for which there is reliable evidence that homeopathy is effective". The federal government only ended up accepting three of the 45 recommendations made by the 2018 review of Pharmacy Remuneration and Regulation. The same year the US Food and Drug Administration (FDA) held a hearing requesting public comment on the regulation of homeopathic drugs. In 2017, the FDA announced it would strengthen regulation of homeopathic products.

The American non-profit Center for Inquiry (CFI) filed a lawsuit in 2018 against the CVS pharmacy for consumer fraud over its sale of homeopathic medicines. It claimed that CVS was selling homeopathic products on an easier-to-obtain basis than standard medication. In 2019, CFI brought a similar lawsuit against Walmart for "committing wide-scale consumer fraud and endangering the health of its customers through its sale and marketing of homeopathic medicines". They also conducted a survey in which they found consumers felt ripped off when informed of the lack of evidence for the efficacy of homeopathic remedies, such as those sold by Walmart and CVS.

In 2021, the French healthcare minister phased out social security reimbursements for homeopathic drugs. France has long had a stronger belief in the virtues of homeopathic drugs than many other countries and the world's biggest manufacturer of alternative medicine drugs, Boiron, is located in that country. Spain also announced moves to ban homeopathy and other pseudotherapies. In 2016, the University of Barcelona cancelled its master's degree in Homeopathy citing "lack of scientific basis", after advice from the Spanish Ministry of Health. Shortly afterwards the University of Valencia announced the elimination of its Masters in Homeopathy.

== Preparations and treatment ==
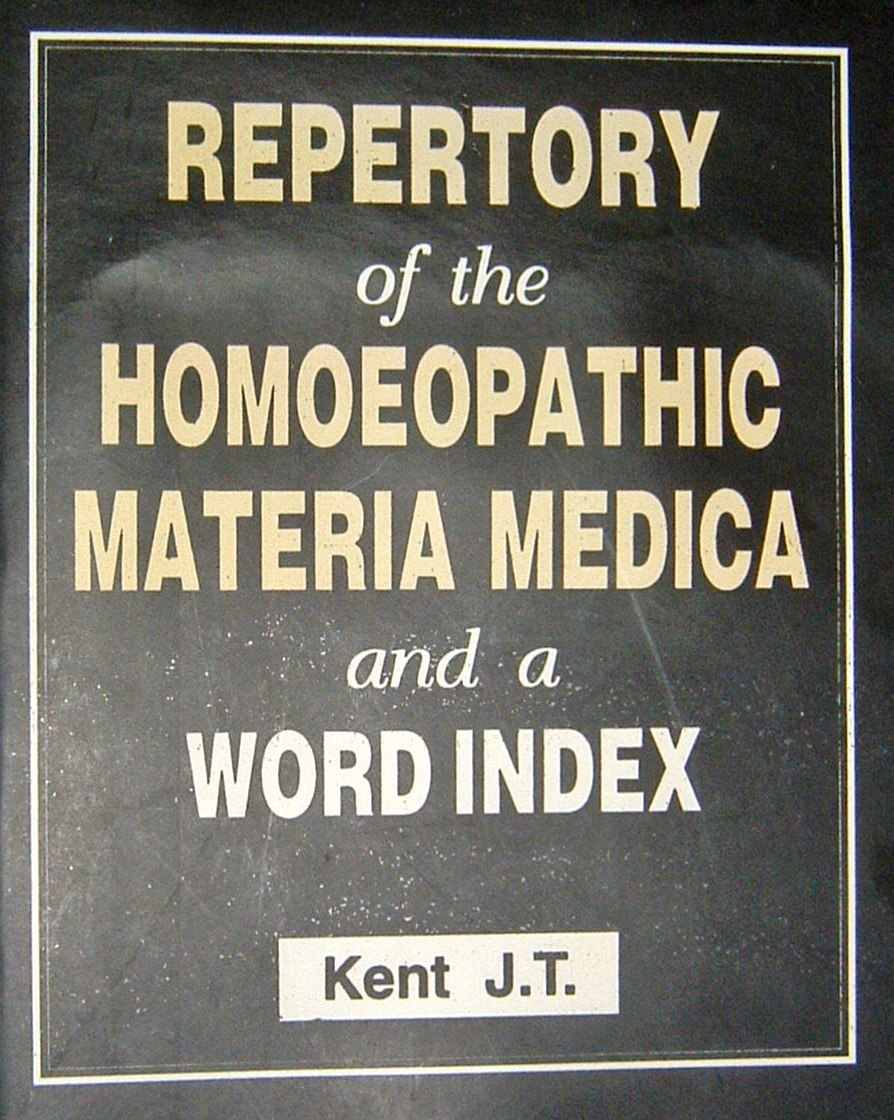
Homeopathic repertory by James Tyler Kent

Homeopathic preparations are referred to as "homeopathic remedies". Practitioners rely on two types of reference when prescribing: Materia medica and repertories. A homeopathic materia medica is a collection of "drug pictures", organized alphabetically. A homeopathic repertory is a quick reference version of the materia medica that indexes the symptoms and then the associated remedies for each. In both cases different compilers may dispute particular inclusions in the references. The first symptomatic homeopathic materia medica was arranged by Hahnemann. The first homeopathic repertory was Georg Jahr's Symptomenkodex, published in German in 1835, and translated into English as the Repertory to the more Characteristic Symptoms of Materia Medica in 1838. This version was less focused on disease categories and was the forerunner to later works by James Tyler Kent. There are over 118 repertories published in English, with Kent's being one of the most used.

=== Consultation ===
Homeopaths generally begin with a consultation, which can be a 10–15 minute appointment or last for over an hour, where the patient describes their medical history. The patient describes the "modalities", or if their symptoms change depending on the weather and other external factors. The practitioner also solicits information on mood, likes and dislikes, physical, mental and emotional states, life circumstances, and any physical or emotional illnesses. This information (also called the "symptom picture") is matched to the "drug picture" in the materia medica or repertory and used to determine the appropriate homeopathic remedies. In classical homeopathy, the practitioner attempts to match a single preparation to the totality of symptoms (the simlilum), while "clinical homeopathy" involves combinations of preparations based on the illness's symptoms.

=== Preparation ===
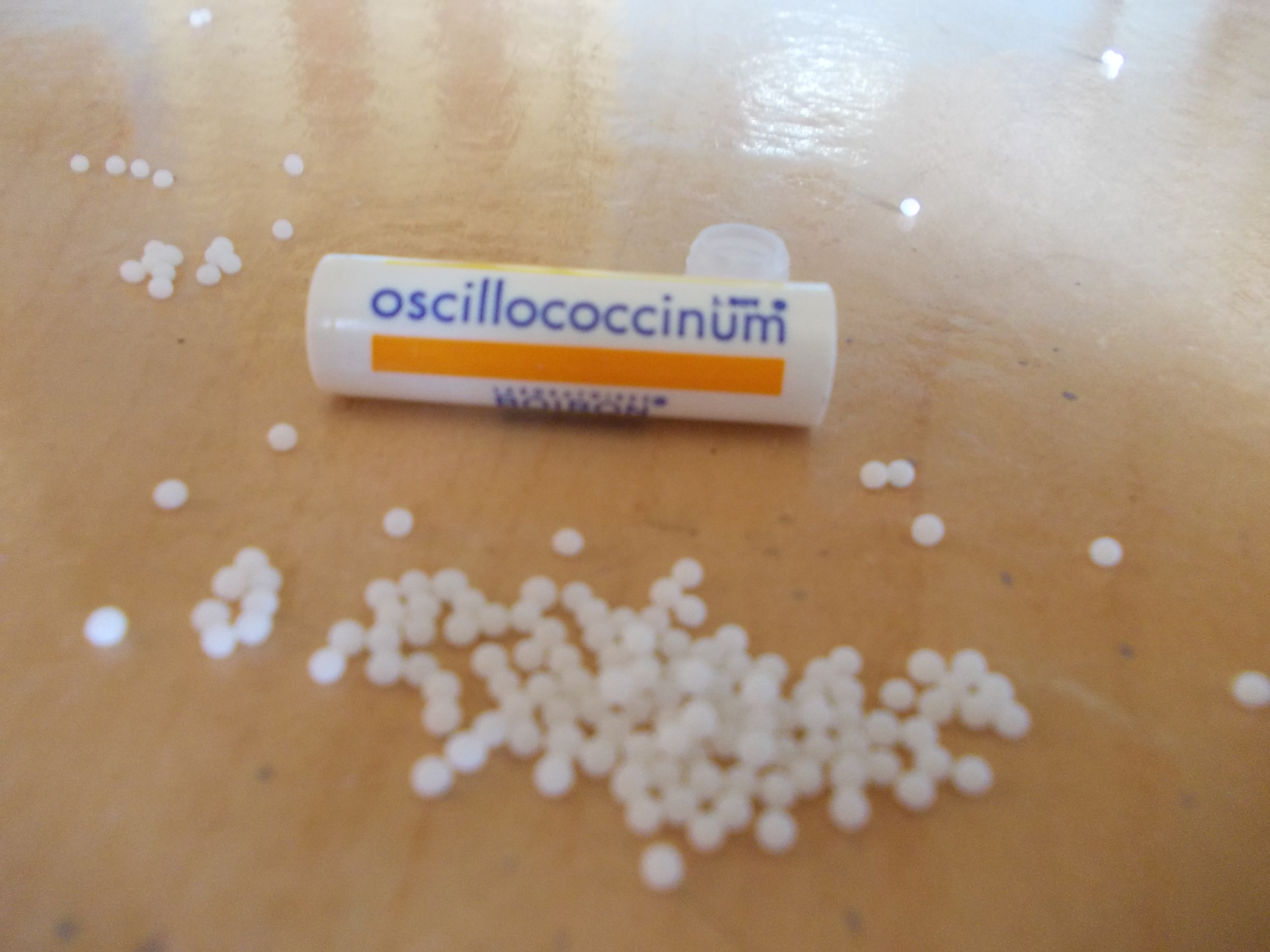
Oscillococcinum, a homeopathic remedy in pill form

Homeopathy uses animal, plant, mineral, and synthetic substances in its preparations, generally referring to them using Latin names. Examples include arsenicum album (arsenic oxide), natrum muriaticum (sodium chloride or table salt), Lachesis muta (the venom of the bushmaster snake), opium, and thyroidinum (thyroid hormone). Homeopaths say this is to ensure accuracy. In the USA the common name must be displayed, although the Latin one can also be present. Homeopathic pills are made from an inert substance (often sugars, typically lactose), upon which a drop of liquid homeopathic preparation is placed and allowed to evaporate.

Isopathy is a therapy derived from homeopathy in which the preparations come from diseased or pathological products such as fecal, urinary and respiratory discharges, blood, and tissue. They are called nosodes (from the Greek nosos, disease) with preparations made from "healthy" specimens being termed "sarcodes". Many so-called "homeopathic vaccines" are a form of isopathy. Tautopathy is a form of isopathy where the preparations are composed of drugs or vaccines that a person has consumed in the past, in the belief that this can reverse the supposed lingering damage caused by the initial use. There is no convincing scientific evidence for isopathy as an effective method of treatment.

Some modern homeopaths use preparations they call "imponderables" because they do not originate from a substance but some other phenomenon presumed to have been "captured" by alcohol or lactose. Examples include X-rays and sunlight. Another derivative is electrohomeopathy, where an electric bio-energy of therapeutic value is supposedly extracted from plants. Popular in the late nineteenth century, electrohomeopathy is pseudo-scientific. In 2012, the Allahabad High Court in Uttar Pradesh, India, handed down a decree stating that electrohomeopathy was quackery and no longer recognized it as a system of medicine.

Other minority practices include paper preparations, in which the terms for substances and dilutions are written on pieces of paper and either pinned to the patients' clothing, put in their pockets, or placed under glasses of water that are then given to the patients. Radionics, the use of electromagnetic radiation such as radio waves, can also be used to manufacture preparations. Such practices have been strongly criticized by classical homeopaths as unfounded, speculative, and verging upon magic and superstition. Flower preparations are produced by placing flowers in water and exposing them to sunlight. The most famous of these are the Bach flower remedies, which were developed by Edward Bach.

=== Dilutions ===
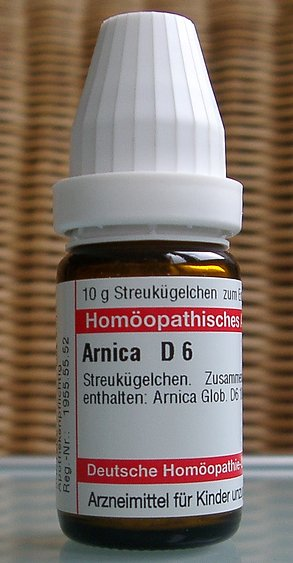
This bottle is labelled Arnica montana (wolf's bane) D6, i.e. the nominal dilution is one part in a million (10^{-6}).

Hahnemann claimed that undiluted doses caused reactions, sometimes dangerous ones, and thus that preparations be given at the lowest possible dose. A solution that is more dilute is described as having a higher "potency", and thus is claimed to be stronger and deeper-acting. The general method of dilution is serial dilution, where solvent is added to part of the previous mixture, but the "Korsakovian" method may also be used, whereby the vessel in which the preparations are manufactured is emptied and then refilled with solvent, with the amount of fluid adhering to the walls of the vessel deemed sufficient for the new batch. The Korsakovian method is sometimes referred to as K on the label of a homeopathic preparation. Another method is Fluxion, which dilutes the substance by continuously passing water through the vial. Insoluble solids, such as granite, diamond, and platinum, are diluted by grinding them with lactose ("trituration").

Three main logarithmic dilution scales are in regular use in homeopathy. Hahnemann created the "centesimal" or "C scale", diluting a substance by a factor of 100 at each stage. There is also a decimal dilution scale (notated as "X" or "D") in which the preparation is diluted by a factor of 10 at each stage. The centesimal scale was favoured by Hahnemann for most of his life, although in his last ten years Hahnemann developed a quintamillesimal (Q) scale which diluted the drug to 1 part in 50,000. A 2C dilution has one part of the original substance in 10,000 parts of the solution. In standard chemistry, this produces a substance with a concentration of 0.01% (volume-volume percentage). A 6C dilution ends up with the original substance diluted by a factor of 100^{−6} (one part in one trillion). The end product is usually so diluted as to be indistinguishable from the diluent (pure water, sugar or alcohol). The greatest dilution reasonably likely to contain at least one molecule of the original substance is approximately 12C.

Hahnemann advocated dilutions of 1 part to 10^{60} or 30C. Hahnemann regularly used dilutions of up to 30C but opined that "there must be a limit to the matter". To counter the reduced potency at high dilutions he formed the view that vigorous shaking by striking on an elastic surface – a process termed succussion – was necessary. Homeopaths are unable to agree on the number and force of strikes needed, and there is no way that the claimed results of succussion can be tested.

Critics of homeopathy commonly emphasize the dilutions involved in homeopathy, using analogies. One mathematically correct example is that a 12C solution is equivalent to "a pinch of salt in both the North and South Atlantic Oceans". One-third of a drop of some original substance diluted into all the water on Earth would produce a preparation with a concentration of about 13C. The science animation YouTube channel Kurzgesagt: In a Nutshell notes that a dilution of 30C, a homeopathic pill with just a single atom of target substance would have to be so large that it would be as long as the distance from the Earth to the Sun and would collapse into a black hole under its own gravity. Robert L. Park points out that a 200C dilution of duck liver, marketed under the name Oscillococcinum, would require 10^{320} universes worth of molecules to contain just one original molecule in the final substance. The high dilutions characteristically used are often considered to be the most controversial and implausible aspect of homeopathy.

=== Provings ===
Homeopaths claim that they can determine the properties of their preparations by following a method which they call "proving". As performed by Hahnemann, provings involved administering various preparations to healthy volunteers. The volunteers were then observed, often for months at a time. They were made to keep extensive journals detailing all of their symptoms at specific times throughout the day. They were forbidden from consuming coffee, tea, spices, or wine for the duration of the experiment; playing chess was also prohibited because Hahnemann considered it to be "too exciting", though they were allowed to drink beer and encouraged to exercise in moderation. At first Hahnemann used undiluted doses for provings, but he later advocated provings with preparations at a 30C dilution, and most modern provings are carried out using ultra-dilute preparations.

Provings are claimed to have been important in the development of the clinical trial, due to their early use of simple control groups, systematic and quantitative procedures, and some of the first application of statistics in medicine. The lengthy records of self-experimentation by homeopaths have occasionally proven useful in the development of modern drugs: For example, evidence that nitroglycerin might be useful as a treatment for angina was discovered by looking through homeopathic provings, though homeopaths themselves never used it for that purpose at that time. The first recorded provings were published by Hahnemann in his 1796 Essay on a New Principle. His Fragmenta de Viribus (1805) contained the results of 27 provings, and his 1810 Materia Medica Pura contained 65. For James Tyler Kent's 1905 Lectures on Homoeopathic Materia Medica, 217 preparations underwent provings and newer substances are continually added to contemporary versions.

Though the proving process has superficial similarities with clinical trials, it is fundamentally different in that the process is subjective, not blinded, and modern provings are unlikely to use pharmacologically active levels of the substance under proving. As early as 1842, Oliver Holmes had noted that provings were impossibly vague, and the purported effect was not repeatable among different subjects.

== Evidence and efficacy ==
Outside of the alternative medicine community, scientists have long considered homeopathy a sham or a pseudoscience, and the medical community regards it as quackery. There is an overall absence of sound statistical evidence of therapeutic efficacy, which is consistent with the lack of any biologically plausible pharmacological agent or mechanism. Proponents argue that homeopathic medicines must work by some, as yet undefined, biophysical mechanism. No homeopathic preparation has been shown to be different from placebo.

=== Lack of scientific evidence ===
The lack of convincing scientific evidence supporting its efficacy and its use of preparations without active ingredients have led to characterizations of homeopathy as pseudoscience and quackery, or, in the words of a 1998 medical review, "placebo therapy at best and quackery at worst". The Russian Academy of Sciences considers homeopathy a "dangerous 'pseudoscience' that does not work", and "urges people to treat homeopathy 'on a par with magic'". The Chief Medical Officer for England, Dame Sally Davies, has stated that homeopathic preparations are "rubbish" and do not serve as anything more than placebos. In 2013, Mark Walport, the UK Government Chief Scientific Adviser and head of the Government Office for Science said "homeopathy is nonsense, it is non-science." His predecessor, John Beddington, said that homeopathy "has no underpinning of scientific basis" but that his views as chief scientific adviser were being "fundamentally ignored" by the Government.

Jack Killen, acting deputy director of the National Center for Complementary and Alternative Medicine, says homeopathy "goes beyond current understanding of chemistry and physics". He adds: "There is, to my knowledge, no condition for which homeopathy has been proven to be an effective treatment." Ben Goldacre says that homeopaths who misrepresent scientific evidence to a scientifically illiterate public, have "... walled themselves off from academic medicine, and critique has been all too often met with avoidance rather than argument". Homeopaths often prefer to ignore meta-analyses in favour of cherry-picked positive results, such as by promoting a particular observational study (one which Goldacre describes as "little more than a customer-satisfaction survey") as if it were more informative than a series of randomized controlled trials.

In an article entitled "Should We Maintain an Open Mind about Homeopathy?" published in the American Journal of Medicine, Michael Baum and Edzard Ernst – writing to other physicians – wrote that "Homeopathy is among the worst examples of faith-based medicine... These axioms [of homeopathy] are not only out of line with scientific facts but also directly opposed to them. If homeopathy is correct, much of physics, chemistry, and pharmacology must be incorrect...".

=== Plausibility of dilutions ===
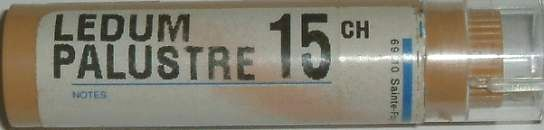
A homeopathic preparation made from marsh tea: the "15C" dilution shown here means the original solution was diluted to 1/10^{30} of its original strength.

The exceedingly low concentration of homeopathic preparations, which often lack even a single molecule of the diluted substance, has been the basis of questions about the effects of the preparations since the 19th century. The laws of chemistry give this dilution limit, which is related to the Avogadro number, as being roughly equal to 12C homeopathic dilutions (1 part in 10^{24}). James Randi and the 10:23 campaign groups have highlighted the lack of active ingredients by taking large 'overdoses'. None of the hundreds of demonstrators in the UK, Australia, New Zealand, Canada and the US were injured and "no one was cured of anything, either".

Modern advocates of homeopathy have proposed a concept of "water memory", according to which water "remembers" the substances mixed in it, and transmits the effect of those substances when consumed. This concept is inconsistent with the current understanding of matter, and water memory has never been demonstrated to have any detectable effect, biological or otherwise. Existence of a pharmacological effect in the absence of any true active ingredient is inconsistent with the law of mass action and the observed dose-response relationships characteristic of therapeutic drugs. Homeopaths contend that their methods produce a therapeutically active preparation, selectively including only the intended substance, though in reality any water will have been in contact with millions of different substances throughout its history, and homeopaths cannot account for the selected homeopathic substance being isolated as a special case in their process. Practitioners also hold that higher dilutions produce stronger medicinal effects. This idea is also inconsistent with observed dose-response relationships, where effects are dependent on the concentration of the active ingredient in the body. Some contend that the phenomenon of hormesis may support the idea of dilution increasing potency, but the dose-response relationship outside the zone of hormesis declines with dilution as normal, and nonlinear pharmacological effects do not provide any credible support for homeopathy.

=== Efficacy ===
Explanations for efficacy of homeopathic preparations:
The placebo effect	The intensive consultation process and expectations for the homeopathic preparations may cause the effect
Therapeutic effect of the consultation	The care, concern, and reassurance a patient experiences when opening up to a compassionate caregiver can have a positive effect on the patient's well-being.
Unassisted natural healing	Time and the body's ability to heal without assistance can eliminate many diseases of their own accord.
Unrecognized treatments	An unrelated food, exercise, environmental agent, or treatment for a different ailment, may have occurred.
Regression towards the mean	Since many diseases or conditions are cyclical, symptoms vary over time and patients tend to seek care when discomfort is greatest; they may feel better anyway but because of the timing of the visit to the homeopath they attribute improvement to the preparation taken.
Non-homeopathic treatment	Patients may also receive standard medical care at the same time as homeopathic treatment, and the former is responsible for improvement.
Cessation of unpleasant treatment	Often homeopaths recommend patients stop getting medical treatment such as surgery or drugs, which can cause unpleasant side-effects; improvements are attributed to homeopathy when the actual cause is the cessation of the treatment causing side-effects in the first place, but the underlying disease remains untreated and still dangerous to the patient.

No individual homeopathic preparation has been unambiguously shown by research to be different from placebo. The methodological quality of the early primary research was low, with problems such as weaknesses in study design and reporting, small sample size, and selection bias. Since better quality trials have become available, the evidence for efficacy of homeopathy preparations has diminished; the highest-quality trials indicate that the preparations themselves exert no intrinsic effect. A review conducted in 2010 of all the pertinent studies of "best evidence" produced by the Cochrane Collaboration concluded that this evidence "fails to demonstrate that homeopathic medicines have effects beyond placebo."

In 2009, the United Kingdom's House of Commons Science and Technology Committee concluded that there was no compelling evidence of effect other than placebo. The Australian National Health and Medical Research Council completed a comprehensive review of the effectiveness of homeopathic preparations in 2015, in which it concluded that "there were no health conditions for which there was reliable evidence that homeopathy was effective." The European Academies' Science Advisory Council (EASAC) published its official analysis in 2017 finding a lack of evidence that homeopathic products are effective, and raising concerns about quality control. In contrast a 2011 book was published, purportedly financed by the Swiss government, that concluded that homeopathy was effective and cost efficient. Although hailed by proponents as proof that homeopathy works, it was found to be scientifically, logically and ethically flawed, with most authors having a conflict of interest. The Swiss Federal Office of Public Health later released a statement saying the book was published without the consent of the Swiss government.

Meta-analyses, essential tools to summarize evidence of therapeutic efficacy, and systematic reviews have found that the methodological quality in the majority of randomized trials in homeopathy have shortcomings and that such trials were generally of lower quality than trials of conventional medicine. A major issue has been publication bias, where positive results are more likely to be published in journals. This has been particularly marked in alternative medicine journals, where few of the published articles (just 5% during the year 2000) tend to report null results. A systematic review of the available systematic reviews confirmed in 2002 that higher-quality trials tended to have less positive results, and found no convincing evidence that any homeopathic preparation exerts clinical effects different from placebo. The same conclusion was also reached in 2005 in a meta-analysis published in The Lancet. A 2017 systematic review and meta-analysis found that the most reliable evidence did not support the effectiveness of non-individualized homeopathy.

Health organizations, including the UK's National Health Service, the American Medical Association, the FASEB, and the National Health and Medical Research Council of Australia, have issued statements saying that there is no good-quality evidence that homeopathy is effective as a treatment for any health condition. In 2009, World Health Organization official Mario Raviglione criticized the use of homeopathy to treat tuberculosis and another WHO spokesperson stated that there was no evidence homeopathy would be an effective treatment for diarrhoea. They warned against the use of homeopathy for serious conditions such as depression, HIV and malaria. The American College of Medical Toxicology and the American Academy of Clinical Toxicology recommend that homeopathic treatment not be used for disease or as a preventive health measure. These organizations report that there is no evidence that homeopathic treatment is effective, but that there is evidence that using these treatments causes direct harm and can also lead to harm by delaying appropriate treatment.

=== Purported effects in other biological systems ===
While some articles have suggested that homeopathic solutions of high dilution can have statistically significant effects on organic processes including the growth of grain and enzyme reactions, such evidence is disputed since attempts to replicate them have failed. In 2001 and 2004, Madeleine Ennis published a number of studies that reported that homeopathic dilutions of histamine exerted an effect on the activity of basophils. In response to the first of these studies, Horizon aired a programme in which British scientists attempted to replicate Ennis' results; they were unable to do so. A 2007 systematic review of high-dilution experiments found that none of the experiments with positive results could be reproduced by all investigators.

In 1988, French immunologist Jacques Benveniste published a paper in the journal Nature while working at INSERM. The paper purported to have discovered that basophils released histamine when exposed to a homeopathic dilution of anti-immunoglobulin E antibody. Skeptical of the findings, Nature assembled an independent investigative team to determine the accuracy of the research. After investigation the team found that the experiments were "statistically ill-controlled", "interpretation has been clouded by the exclusion of measurements in conflict with the claim", and concluded, "We believe that experimental data have been uncritically assessed and their imperfections inadequately reported."

== Ethics and safety ==
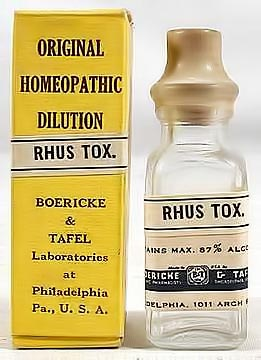
Homeopathic preparation Rhus toxicodendron, derived from poison ivy

The provision of homeopathic preparations has been described as unethical. Michael Baum, professor emeritus of surgery and visiting professor of medical humanities at University College London (UCL), has described homeopathy as a "cruel deception". Edzard Ernst, the first professor of complementary medicine in the United Kingdom and a former homeopathic practitioner, has expressed his concerns about pharmacists who violate their ethical code by failing to provide customers with "necessary and relevant information" about the true nature of the homeopathic products they advertise and sell. In 2013 the UK Advertising Standards Authority concluded that the Society of Homeopaths were targeting vulnerable ill people and discouraging the use of essential medical treatment while making misleading claims of efficacy for homeopathic products. In 2015 the Federal Court of Australia imposed penalties on a homeopathic company for making false or misleading statements about the efficacy of the whooping cough vaccine and recommending homeopathic remedies as an alternative.

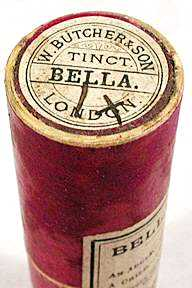
Old homeopathic belladonna preparation

A 2000 review by homeopaths reported that homeopathic preparations are "unlikely to provoke severe adverse reactions". In 2012, a systematic review evaluating evidence of homeopathy's possible adverse effects concluded that "homeopathy has the potential to harm patients and consumers in both direct and indirect ways". A 2016 systematic review and meta-analysis found that, in homeopathic clinical trials, adverse effects were reported among the patients who received homeopathy about as often as they were reported among patients who received placebo or conventional medicine.

Some homeopathic preparations involve poisons such as Belladonna, arsenic, and poison ivy. In rare cases, the original ingredients are present at detectable levels. This may be due to improper preparation or intentional low dilution. Serious adverse effects such as seizures and death have been reported or associated with some homeopathic preparations. Instances of arsenic poisoning have occurred. In 2009, the FDA advised consumers to stop using three discontinued cold remedy Zicam products because it could cause permanent damage to users' sense of smell. In 2016 the FDA issued a safety alert to consumers warning against the use of homeopathic teething gels and tablets following reports of adverse events after their use. A previous FDA investigation had found that these products were improperly diluted and contained "unsafe levels of belladonna" and that the reports of serious adverse events in children using this product were "consistent with belladonna toxicity".

Patients who choose to use homeopathy rather than evidence-based medicine risk missing timely diagnosis and effective treatment, thereby worsening the outcomes of serious conditions such as cancer. The Russian Commission on Pseudoscience has said homeopathy is not safe because "patients spend significant amounts of money, buying medicines that do not work and disregard already known effective treatment." Critics have cited cases of patients failing to receive proper treatment for diseases that could have been easily managed with conventional medicine and who have died as a result. They have also condemned the "marketing practice" of criticizing and downplaying the effectiveness of medicine. Homeopaths claim that use of conventional medicines will "push the disease deeper" and cause more serious conditions, a process referred to as "suppression". In 1978, Anthony Campbell, a consultant physician at the Royal London Homeopathic Hospital, criticized statements by George Vithoulkas claiming that syphilis, when treated with antibiotics, would develop into secondary and tertiary syphilis with involvement of the central nervous system. Vithoulkas' claims echo the idea that treating a disease with external medication used to treat the symptoms would only drive it deeper into the body; they conflict with scientific studies which indicate that penicillin treatment produces a complete cure of syphilis in more than 90% of cases.

The use of homeopathy as a preventive for serious infectious diseases, called homeoprophylaxis, is especially controversial. Some homeopaths, particularly those who are non-physicians, advise their patients against immunization. Others have suggested that vaccines be replaced with homeopathic "nosodes". While Hahnemann was opposed to such preparations, modern homeopaths often use them although there is no evidence to indicate they have any beneficial effects. Promotion of homeopathic alternatives to vaccines has been characterized as dangerous, inappropriate and irresponsible. In December 2014, the Australian homeopathy supplier Homeopathy Plus! was found to have acted deceptively in promoting homeopathic alternatives to vaccines. In 2019, an investigative journalism piece by the Telegraph revealed that homeopathy practitioners were actively discouraging patients from vaccinating their children. There have been cases of homeopaths advising against the use of anti-malarial drugs, putting visitors to the tropics in severe danger.

A 2006 review recommends that pharmacy colleges include a required course where ethical dilemmas inherent in recommending products lacking proven safety and efficacy data be discussed, and that students should be taught where unproven systems such as homeopathy depart from evidence-based medicine.

== Regulation and prevalence ==
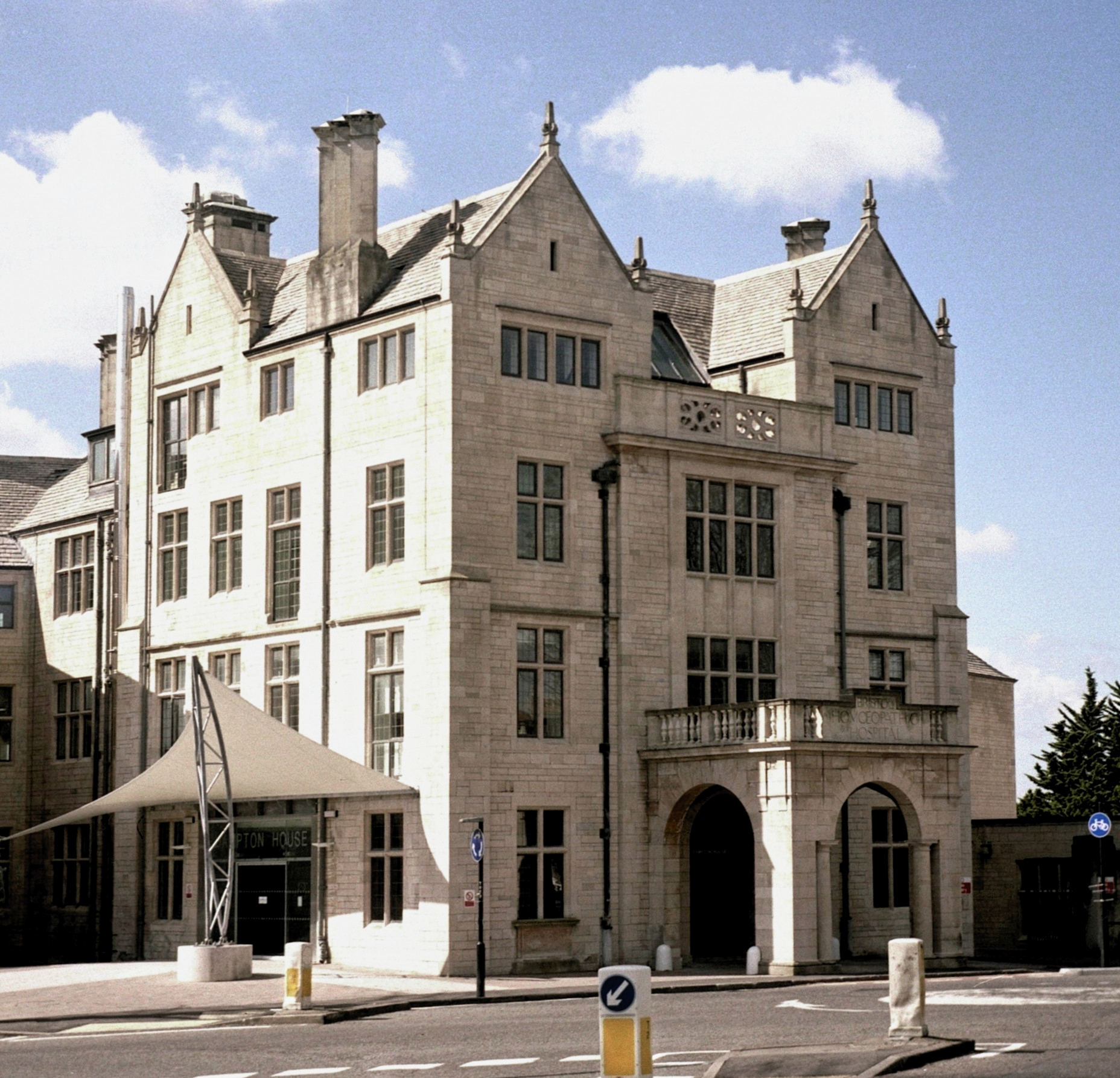
Hampton House, the former site of Bristol Homeopathic Hospital

Homeopathy is fairly common in some countries while being uncommon in others; is highly regulated in some countries and mostly unregulated in others. It is practiced worldwide and professional qualifications and licences are needed in most countries. A 2019 WHO report found that 100 out of 133 member states surveyed in 2012 acknowledged that their population used homeopathy, with 22 saying the practice was regulated and 13 providing health insurance coverage. In some countries, there are no specific legal regulations concerning the use of homeopathy, while in others licences or degrees in conventional medicine from accredited universities are required. In 2001 homeopathy had been integrated into the national health care systems of many countries, including India, Mexico, Pakistan, Sri Lanka, and the United Kingdom.

=== Regulation ===
Some homeopathic treatment is covered by the public health service of several European countries, including Scotland, and Luxembourg. It was covered in France until 2021. In other countries, such as Belgium, homeopathy is not covered. In Austria, the public health service requires scientific proof of effectiveness in order to reimburse medical treatments; homeopathy is listed as not reimbursable, but exceptions can be made, and private health insurance policies sometimes include homeopathic treatments. In 2018, Austria's Medical University of Vienna stopped teaching homeopathy. The Swiss government withdrew coverage of homeopathy and four other complementary treatments in 2005, stating that they did not meet efficacy and cost-effectiveness criteria, but following a referendum in 2009 the five therapies were reinstated for a further 6-year trial period. In Germany, as of 2020, homeopathic treatments were covered by 70 percent of government medical plans, and available in almost every pharmacy. In January 2024, German health minister Karl Lauterbach announced plans to withdraw all statutory health insurance coverage for homeopathic and anthroposophic treatments, citing a lack of scientific evidence for their efficacy.

The English NHS recommended against prescribing homeopathic preparations in 2017. In 2018, prescriptions worth £55,000 (less than 0.001% of the total NHS prescribing budget) were issued in defiance of the guidelines. In 2016 the UK's Committee of Advertising Practice compliance team wrote to homeopaths in the UK to "remind them of the rules that govern what they can and can't say in their marketing materials". The letter told homeopaths to "ensure that they do not make any direct or implied claims that homeopathy can treat medical conditions" and asks them to review their marketing communications "including websites and social media pages" to ensure compliance. Homeopathic services offered at Bristol Homeopathic Hospital in the UK ceased in October 2015.

Member states of the European Union are required to ensure that homeopathic products are registered, although this process does not require any proof of efficacy. In Spain, the Association for the protection of patients from pseudo-scientific therapies is lobbying to get rid of the easy registration procedure for homeopathic remedies. In Bulgaria, Hungary, Latvia, Romania and Slovenia homeopathy, by law, can only be practiced by medical practitioners. However, in Slovenia if doctors practice homeopathy their medical license will be revoked. In Germany, to become a homeopathic physician, one must attend a three-year training program, while France, Austria and Denmark mandate licences to diagnose any illness or dispense of any product whose purpose is to treat any illness. Homeopaths in the UK are under no legal regulations, meaning anyone can call themselves a homeopath and administer homeopathic remedies.

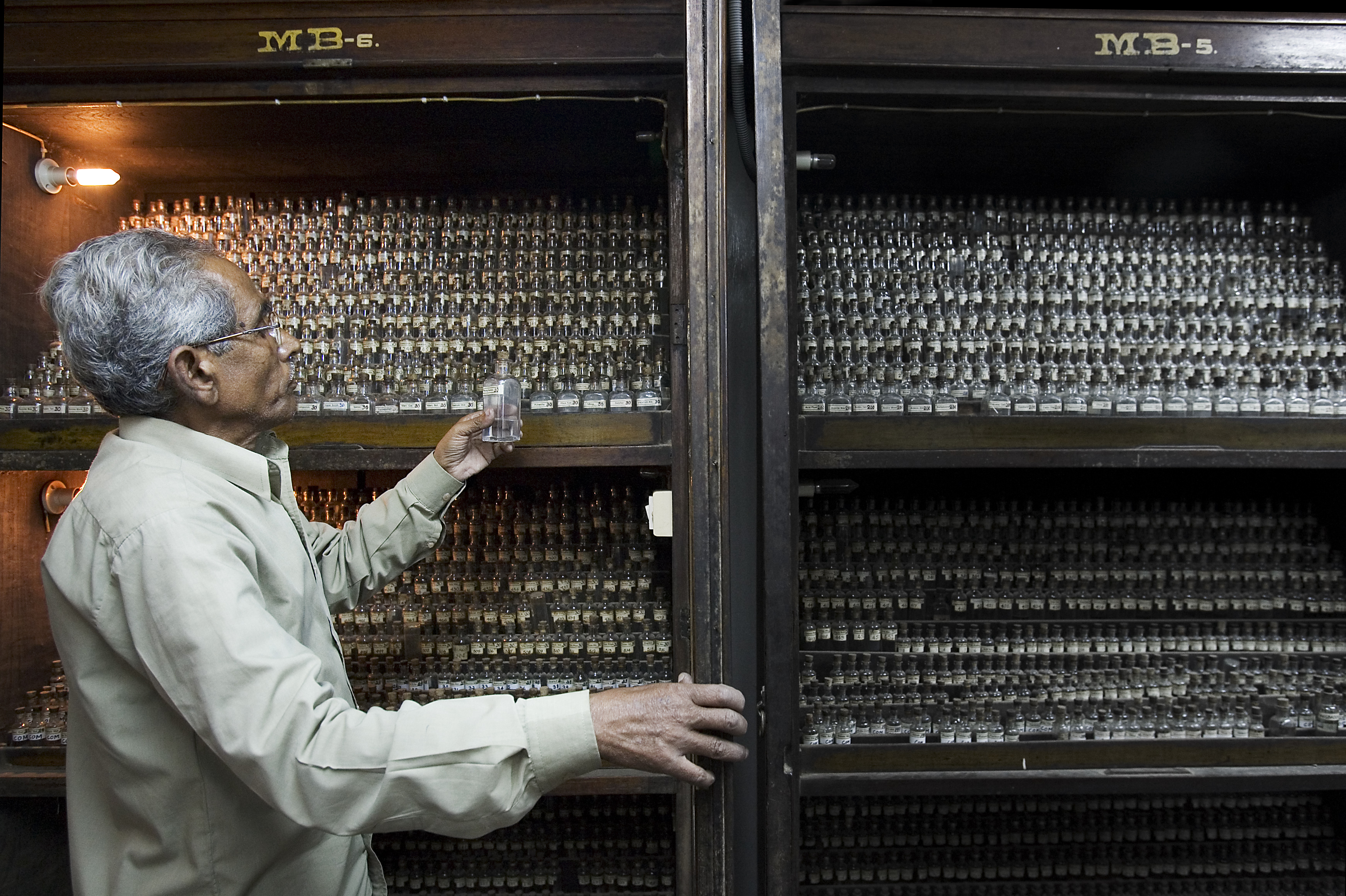
Homeopathics at a homeopathic pharmacy in Varanasi, India

The Indian government recognizes homeopathy as one of its national systems of medicine; homeopathic remedies can be sold with medical claims. It has established the Department of Ayurveda, Yoga and Naturopathy, Unani, Siddha and Homoeopathy (AYUSH) under the Ministry of Health & Family Welfare. The south Indian state of Kerala also has a cabinet-level AYUSH department. The Central Council of Homoeopathy was established in 1973 to monitor higher education in homeopathy, and the National Institute of Homoeopathy in 1975. Principles and standards for homeopathic products are covered by the Homoeopathic pharmacopoeia of India. A minimum of a recognized diploma in homeopathy and registration on a state register or the Central Register of Homoeopathy is required to practice homeopathy in India.

In the United States each state is responsible for the laws and licensing requirements for homeopathy. In 2015, the FDA held a hearing on homeopathic product regulation. At the hearing, representatives from the Center for Inquiry and the Committee for Skeptical Inquiry summarized the harm that is done to the general public from homeopathics and proposed regulatory actions. In 2016 the United States Federal Trade Commission (FTC) issued an "Enforcement Policy Statement Regarding Marketing Claims for Over-the-Counter Homeopathic Drugs" which specified that the FTC will apply the same standard to homeopathic drugs that it applies to other products claiming similar benefits. A related report concluded that claims of homeopathy effectiveness "are not accepted by most modern medical experts and do not constitute competent and reliable scientific evidence that these products have the claimed treatment effects." In 2019, the FDA removed an enforcement policy that permitted unapproved homeopathics to be sold. No homeopathic products are approved by the FDA.

Homeopathic remedies are regulated as natural health products in Canada. Ontario became the first province in the country to regulate the practice of homeopathy, a move that was widely criticized by scientists and doctors. Health Canada requires all products to have a licence before being sold and applicants have to submit evidence on "the safety, efficacy and quality of a homeopathic medicine". In 2015 the Canadian Broadcasting Corporation tested the system by applying for and then receiving a government approved licence for a made-up drug aimed at children.

In Australia, the sale of homeopathic products is regulated by the Therapeutic Goods Administration. In 2015, the National Health and Medical Research Council of Australia concluded that there is "no reliable evidence that homeopathy is effective and should not be used to treat health conditions that are chronic, serious, or could become serious". They recommended anyone considering using homeopathy should first get advice from a registered health practitioner. A 2017 review into Pharmacy Remuneration and Regulation recommended that products be banned from pharmacies; while noting the concerns the government did not adopt the recommendation. In New Zealand there are no regulations specific to homeopathy and the New Zealand Medical Association does not oppose the use of homeopathy, a stance that has been called unethical by some doctors. In September 2024 the government agreed a policy on the future of natural health products.

=== Prevalence ===
Homeopathy is one of the most commonly used forms of alternative medicines and it has a large worldwide market. The exact size is uncertain, but information available on homeopathic sales suggests it forms a large share of the medical market.

In 1999, about 1,000 UK doctors practiced homeopathy, most being general practitioners who prescribe a limited number of remedies. A further 1,500 homeopaths with no medical training are also thought to practice. Over ten thousand German and French doctors use homeopathy. In the United States a National Health Interview Survey estimated 5 million adults and 1 million children used homeopathy in 2011. An analysis of this survey concluded that most cases were self-prescribed for colds and musculoskeletal pain. Major retailers including Walmart, CVS, and Walgreens sell homeopathic products that are packaged to resemble conventional medicines.

The homeopathic drug market in Germany is worth about €650 million; a 2014 survey found that 60% of Germans reported trying homeopathy. A 2009 survey found that only 17 percent of respondents knew how homeopathic medicine was made. France spent more than US$408 million on homeopathic products in 2008. In the United States the homeopathic market is worth about US$3 billion per year, with $2.9 billion spent in 2007. Australia spent US$7.3 million on homeopathic medicines in 2008.

In India, a 2014 national health survey found that homeopathy was used by about 3% of the population. Homeopathy is used in China, although it arrived a lot later than in many other countries, partly due to the restriction on foreigners that persisted until late in the nineteenth century. Throughout Africa there is a high reliance on traditional medicines, which can be attributed to the cost of modern medicines and the relative prevalence of practitioners. Many African countries do not have any official training facilities.

== Veterinary use ==
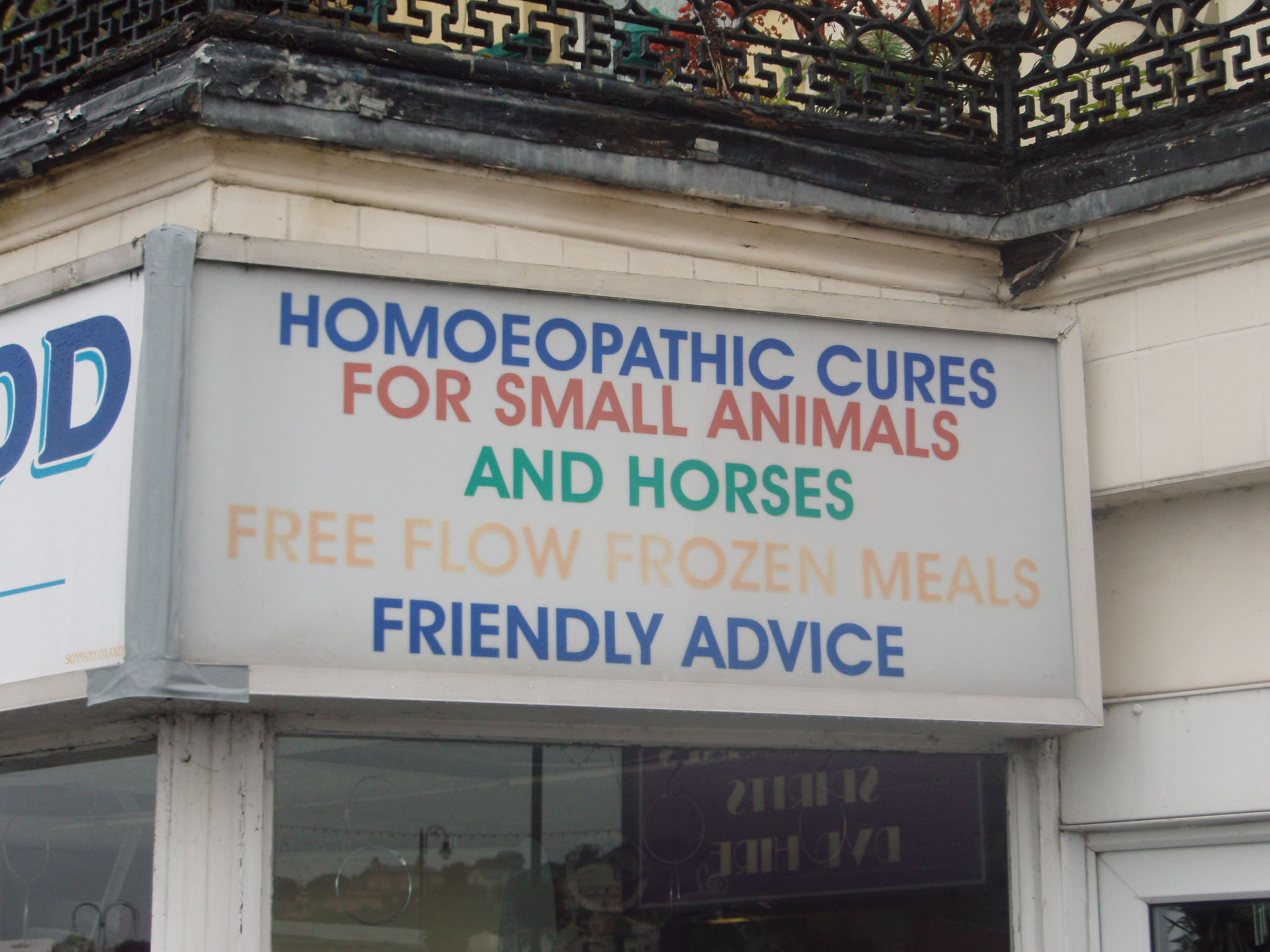
Homeopathic cures for small animals on the Isle of Man

Using homeopathy as a treatment for animals is termed "veterinary homeopathy" and dates back to the inception of homeopathy; Hahnemann himself wrote and spoke of the use of homeopathy in animals other than humans. The use of homeopathy in the organic farming industry is heavily promoted. In humans there may be benefits following homeopathic treatment due to the placebo effect and the counseling aspects of the consultation; animals are not susceptible to these effects, eliminating these possible benefits. Studies have found that giving animals placebos can play active roles in influencing pet owners to believe in the effectiveness of a treatment which actually has no effect, so that animals given homeopathic remedies continue to suffer, prompting animal welfare concerns.

Little existing research on the subject is of a high enough scientific standard to provide reliable data on efficacy. A 2016 review of peer-reviewed articles from 1981 to 2014 by scientists from the University of Kassel, Germany, concluded that there is not enough evidence to support homeopathy as an effective treatment of infectious diseases in livestock. The UK's Department for Environment, Food and Rural Affairs (Defra) has adopted a robust position against use of "alternative" pet preparations including homeopathy. The British Veterinary Association's position statement on alternative medicines says that it "cannot endorse" homeopathy, and the Australian Veterinary Association includes it on its list of "ineffective therapies".

== See also ==
- Fringe science
- List of topics characterized as pseudoscience
- Scientific skepticism
