= Michael Baum (surgeon) =

British physician and academic (born 1937)

- Born: 1937 (age 88–89)
- Education: University of Birmingham
- Scientific career
- Workplaces: King's College London; University College London
- Website: www.michaelbaum.co.uk

Michael Baum (born 1937), Professor Emeritus of Surgery and visiting Professor of Medical Humanities in University College London (UCL), is a British surgical oncologist who specialises in breast cancer treatment. He is also known for his contributions to the evaluation and support of patient quality of life. He has been Professor of Surgery in King's College London, the Royal Marsden Hospital and UCL. He is a notable critic of alternative medicine. Baum began his career in Israel and has played a major role in promoting links between Israel and the UK in the field of breast cancer research.

== Career ==
Baum's team was the first to demonstrate the effectiveness of adjuvant tamoxifen for early breast cancer, which has contributed to the 30 per cent reduction in breast cancer mortality and its efficacy in the prevention of breast cancer in susceptible women. Since then, while at UCL, he was responsible for the largest-ever international cancer trial (ATAC - Arimidex, Tamoxifen, Alone or in Combination), which in record time showed anastrozole to be better than tamoxifen.

In 2007, Baum received the St Gallen lifetime achievement award for the treatment of breast cancer.

Baum was active in the successful campaign to retain the Royal Marsden's site at Fulham in central London.

=== Inspiration for chemotherapy innovation ===
In a letter to The Times published on 2 December 2025, Baum related how he had a "Damascene conversion" after seeing the 1993 Tom Stoppard play, Arcadia:

Thomasina asks her tutor, Septimus: "If there is an equation for a curve like a bell, there must be an equation for one like a bluebell, and if a bluebell, why not a rose?" With that Stoppard explains chaos theory, which better explains the behaviour of breast cancer. At the point of diagnosis, the cancer must have already scattered cancer cells into the circulation that nest latent in distant organs. The consequence of that hypothesis was the birth of "adjuvant systemic chemotherapy", and rapidly we saw a striking fall of the curve that illustrated patients' survival. Stoppard never learnt how many lives he saved by writing Arcadia.

== Views on medical issues ==
=== Alternative medicine ===
In an article entitled "Should We Maintain an Open Mind about Homeopathy?" published in the American Journal of Medicine, Michael Baum and Edzard Ernst—writing to other physicians—wrote some strong criticisms of homeopathy:

Homeopathy is among the worst examples of faith-based medicine... These axioms [of homeopathy] are not only out of line with scientific facts but also directly opposed to them. If homeopathy is correct, much of physics, chemistry, and pharmacology must be incorrect... To have an open mind about homeopathy or similarly implausible forms of alternative medicine (eg, Bach Flower remedies, spiritual healing, crystal therapy) is therefore not an option. We think that a belief in homeopathy exceeds the tolerance of an open mind. We should start from the premise that homeopathy cannot work and that positive evidence reflects publication bias or design flaws until proved otherwise... We wonder whether any kind of evidence would persuade homeopathic physicians of their self-delusion and challenge them to design a methodologically sound trial, which if negative would finally persuade them to shut up shop... Homeopathy is based on an absurd concept that denies progress in physics and chemistry. Some 160 years after Homeopathy and Its Kindred Delusions, an essay by Oliver Wendell Holmes, we are still debating whether homeopathy is a placebo or not... Homeopathic principles are bold conjectures. There has been no spectacular corroboration of any of its founding principles... After more than 200 years, we are still waiting for homeopathy "heretics" to be proved right, during which time the advances in our understanding of disease, progress in therapeutics and surgery, and prolongation of the length and quality of life by so-called allopaths have been breathtaking. The true skeptic therefore takes pride in closed mindedness when presented with absurd assertions that contravene the laws of thermodynamics or deny progress in all branches of physics, chemistry, physiology, and medicine.

He has also described homoeopathy as a "cruel deception".

In an article in The Times entitled "The top fifty people who influence the way we eat, exercise and think about ourselves", he was described as:

Anti-alternative: The emeritus professor of surgery at University College London wants alternative medicine banned in the NHS. Claim to fame: He described homoeopathy as a "cruel deception" in an open letter to health authority bosses. Lasting legacy: Has given a spur to the NHS to be more consistent in what it provides free and what it doesn't.

In a letter from Michael Baum and 13 other scientists to the chief executives of all 476 acute and primary care trusts, they wrote:

Re Use of ‘alternative’ medicine in the NHS. We are a group of physicians and scientists who are concerned about ways in which unproven or disproved treatments are being encouraged for general use in the NHS.... While medical practice must remain open to new discoveries for which there is convincing evidence, including any branded as ‘alternative’, it would be highly irresponsible to embrace any medicine as though it were a matter of principle.... These are not trivial matters. We urge you to take an early opportunity to review practice in your own trust with a view to ensuring that patients do not receive misleading information about the effectiveness of alternative medicines. We would also ask you to write to the Department of Health requesting evidence-based information for trusts and for patients with respect to alternative medicine.

In an open letter to Prince Charles, rebuking him for his stance on alternative medicine, he wrote:

The power of my authority comes with a knowledge built on 40 years of study and 25 years of active involvement in cancer research... Your power and authority rest on an accident of birth.

He was one of the founders of the charity HealthSense, which champions evidence-based medicine.

=== Breast cancer screening ===
Professor Baum is also critical of the breast cancer screening program and believes women are not receiving accurate and complete information on the actual benefits and risks of the procedure. This means most women are not giving informed consent for breast cancer screening. In 2010 he gave a lecture at UCL entitled, "Breast cancer Screening: Some Inconvenient Truths".

In an article entitled "What are the drawbacks of breast screening?" published in 2011, Michael Baum criticised the NHS Breast Screening Programme:

Whatever the number, that one woman who benefits from a decade of screening has a life of infinite worth and if screening were as non‐toxic as wearing a seat belt there would be no case to answer. However, there is a downside to screening, namely the problem of the over‐diagnosis of "pseudo‐cancers". … (F)or every life saved ten healthy women will, as a consequence, become cancer patients and will be treated unnecessarily. These women will have either a part of their breast or the whole breast removed, and they will often receive radiotherapy and sometimes chemotherapy.
