= CEASE therapy =

Pseudoscientific treatment that claims to cure autism

- Claims: Incorrect theories around the causes of autism; unevidenced and implausible treatments for autism
- Related scientific disciplines: Autism spectrum; Anti-vaccinationism; Homeopathy; Megavitamin therapy
- Original proponents: Tinus Smits

CEASE (Complete Elimination of Autistic Spectrum Expression) therapy is a pseudoscientific practice used by naturopaths (particularly homeopaths) who claim that it can treat or even cure people with autism, claims which have been adjudicated by the UK's Advertising Standards Authority as "bogus". It involves a mixture of supplements, high-dose vitamin C, 'orthomolecular support', dietary restrictions, and homeopathy. The therapy was developed by Dutch doctor Tinus Smits, who claimed to have used it to treat over 300 children with autism. It became more notable in 2017/2018 because of regulatory action taken by professional bodies in The Netherlands, UK, and Canada following a series of complaints about unfounded claims.

Smits in the book Autism Beyond Despair – CEASE Therapy stated that autistic children should never be vaccinated.

== Regulatory action ==
In October 2017, the Dutch Advertising Code Foundation (Stichting Reclame Code) found that the official website for CEASE therapy was in breach of advertising regulations.

In 2022, The United Kingdom's National Health Service (NHS) warned against CEASE therapy, which rejects vaccinations and recommends potentially harmful amounts of dietary supplements.

In the United Kingdom, in April 2018 the Professional Standards Authority (PSA) placed some requirements on the Society of Homeopaths (SoH), due to concerns about the way in which members marketed CEASE therapy. The PSA asked the SoH to confirm "what action it will take to ensure children are safe as a condition of its re-accreditation". The following June the SoH published a position statement advising their members not to imply any cure of autism when marketing CEASE therapy. It has been estimated that more than 120 homeopaths are offering CEASE in the UK though not all are SoH members. In its December 2018 accreditation review for the Federation of Holistic Therapists (FHT) the PSA received confirmation from the Federation that none of its registered homeopath members offer CEASE, that any homeopath who offers CEASE would not be accepted onto its register, and that the FHT does not "accept, endorse or insure" CEASE therapy.

In July 2015, the UK's Advertising Standards Authority (ASA) found Teddington Homeopathy's marketing of CEASE therapy in breach of the Advertising Standards Code. The following month the ASA added the company to its list of non-compliant online advertisers for "making unproven efficacy claims for CEASE therapy". In May 2018 the ASA wrote to homeopaths to remind them that "CEASE Therapists cannot claim to cure autism or make claims regarding detoxification" and in July 2018 they upheld an adjudication against Bubbling Life's website, determining that the claims relating to CEASE, vaccination, autism and ASD could discourage customers from seeking appropriate advice or treatment. In March 2019, the ASA published a statement that advertising of CEASE must stop and that they had referred several cases to Trading Standards.

In British Columbia, Canada, the Board of the College of Naturopathic Physicians investigated three CEASE practitioners following complaints from the public and subsequently "determined that naturopathic doctors in British Columbia must not advertise or offer CEASE therapy". As well as this prohibition the College's updated position statements also clarify that naturopathic doctors in BC must not offer anti-vaccination materials or advice (including on social media) and must not imply that vaccination causes autism.

The American Food and Drug Administration (FDA) does not strictly regulate CEASE or homeopathic treatments. However, in response to a question about CEASE it has stated that "[the] FDA has warned about the use of products labeled as homeopathic because of concerns that they have not been shown to offer clinical benefits in treating serious and/or life-threatening medical conditions, and that they also may cause serious harm... It deeply concerns us when we see preventable diseases such as measles – a life-threatening infection we thought we had eliminated in the US in 2000 – now making a tragic comeback and threatening our communities, despite having a vaccine available that is safe and highly effective. A factor contributing to the measles outbreak is inaccurate and misleading information about vaccines rather than the reliance on accurate, scientific-based information."

In May 2019, Homeopathy International's steering group wrote to CEASE practitioners recommending that they consider changing the treatment's name to EASE (for 'Easing Autistic Spectrum Expression') to avoid the "significant legal risk" from using in their marketing material the original name or its acronym, either of which could be interpreted as "making illegal claims to cure". On 28 June 2019 the Good Thinking Society (GTS) charity filed a Judicial Review claim to challenge an earlier decision by the PSA to re-accredit the Society of Homeopaths' register. At the time of filing several (GTS alleges it to be over 50) SoH members were still offering CEASE therapy for autism.

== Expert assessment ==
Speaking on the subject of CEASE and homeopathy, Peter Hotez, dean of the National School of Tropical Medicine at the Baylor College of Medicine, said: "Measles outbreaks were both predicted and predictable as the anti-vaccine movement starts to affect public health in [the USA]. This is just the beginning – it is a harbinger of a new normal in America... There are no alternatives to vaccination against measles and there is no cure to autism – so it's all made up."
