= George Vithoulkas =

Greek teacher and homeopathy practitioner (b. 1932)

- Γιώργος Βυθούλκας
- Born: 25 July 1932 (age 94); Athens, Greece
- Occupations: Homeopath, researcher
- Awards: Right Livelihood Award (1996)
- Scientific career
- Fields: Homeopathy
- Workplaces: International Academy of Classical Homeopathy
- Website: www.vithoulkas.com

George Vithoulkas (Greek: Γιώργος Βυθούλκας; born 25 July 1932, in Athens) is a Greek teacher and practitioner of homeopathy.

He studied homeopathy in South Africa and received a diploma in homeopathy from the Indian Institute of Homeopathy in 1966. Upon receiving his diploma, he returned to Greece where he practiced and began teaching classical homeopathy to a small group of medical doctors. His alleged therapeutic success drew attention and led to the establishment in 1970 of what eventually became the Center of Homeopathic Medicine in Athens, a school exclusively for M.D.s. In 1972, Vithoulkas started a Greek homeopathic journal, Homeopathic Medicine. In 1976, he organized the first of an annual series of International Homeopathic Seminars. In 1995, he opened the International Academy for Classical Homeopathy (I.A.C.H.) on Alonissos, to provide postgraduate training for homeopaths. It is dedicated exclusively to the teaching of homeopathy.

Vithoulkas has authored a number of books on homeopathy, two of which, Homeopathy: Medicine of the New Man and The Science of Homeopathy, have been translated extensively, and is currently writing Materia Medica Viva, a homeopathic materia medica or reference work on homeopathic remedies, to reach 16 volumes when finished. In addition to his books, he has published numerous articles in homeopathic journals and has developed an expert system for homeopaths to use in choosing remedies for their patients.

Vithoulkas was a recipient of the Right Livelihood Award in 1996 for "his outstanding contribution to the revival of homeopathic knowledge and the training of homeopaths to the highest standards."

== Praise and criticism ==
According to Vithoulkas's citation from the Right Livelihood award, his books "have had a profound influence upon the acceptance and practice of homeopathy worldwide."

He has been described as "the maestro of classical homeopathy" by Robin Shohet; Lyle Morgan says he is "widely considered to be the greatest living homeopathic theorist"; and Scott Shannon calls him a "contemporary master of homeopathy." Paul Ekins credited Vithoulkas with the revival of the credibility of homeopathy. Vithoulkas has also made an expert system 'VES'(Vithoulkas Expert System) that has been incorporated into the RADAR software.

His biography has been published in the book Georgos Vithoulkas Der Meister-Homöopath Biographie und Fälle by the journalist Peter Clotten and the homeopath Susan Pfeifer who studied at his International Academy for Classical Homeopathy.

In 1978, Anthony Campbell, then a consultant physician at The Royal London Homeopathic Hospital, reviewed The Science of Homoeopathy. He criticised Vithoulkas for substituting assertion for hard evidence and constructing an almost meaningless argument on the basis of a dubious theory of disease. He described rhetoric put forward by Vithoulkas (in presenting the argument that "allopathic drugging" is harmful and must be avoided) as including a thoroughly irresponsible statement which could mislead an unfortunate layman into refusing orthodox treatment, mentioning Vithoulkas' claim, "in the course of an argument designed to show that 'allopathic drugging' is harmful and must be avoided", that syphilis, when treated with antibiotics, would have the early stages suppressed, but would go on to the secondary and tertiary stages. However, he felt the book also provided a good, if dogmatic, description of the principles and practice of "classical" homoeopathy. In response, Vithoulkas quoted various medical studies he claimed supported his assertion that penicillin "may suppress primary syphilis while failing to prevent the insidious development of a tertiary stage, especially as manifested in psychosis." Vithoulkas's claims conflict with scientific studies, which indicate that penicillin treatment produces a complete cure of syphilis in more than 90% of cases.

== Selected works ==
- Homeopathy: Medicine of the New Man (New York: Arco, 1979)
- The Science of Homeopathy (New York: Grove Press, 1980)
- A New Model for Health and Disease (IACH, 2008 [North Atlantic Books,1991])
- Homeopathy: Medicine for the New Millennium (IACH, 2000)
- Materia Medica Viva (IACH, 2000- ) 12 volumes completed to date, 16 planned
- The Essence of Materia Medica ISBN 8170211387
- Classical Homeopathy for Anxiety & Jealousy (Baar: Groma Publishers, 2011 [2004])
- Additions to Kent's Repertory of the Homeopathic Materia Medica (New Delhi: B.Jain, 1989)
- The Bern Seminars 1987 (IACH, 2009 [Ulrich Burgdorf, 1989])
- The Celle Seminars (IACH, 2009 [Ulrich Burgdorf, 1992])
- The Esalen Conferences Volume I (IACH, 2010)
- The Esalen Conferences Volume II (IACH, 2010)
- Levels of Health: The Second Volume of The Science of Homeopathy - Revised Edition (IACH, 2017 [2010])
