= Cease (surname) =

Cease is a surname. Notable people with the surname include:

- Daniel L. Cease (died 1928), American magazine editor
- Dylan Cease (born 1995), American baseball player
- Jane Cease (born 1936), American politician
- Jeff Cease (born 1967), American musician
- Kyle Cease (born 1977), American actor
- Lil' Cease (born 1978), American rapper
