= Homeopathy and Its Kindred Delusions =

1842 work by Oliver Wendell Holmes Sr.

Homœopathy and Its Kindred Delusions
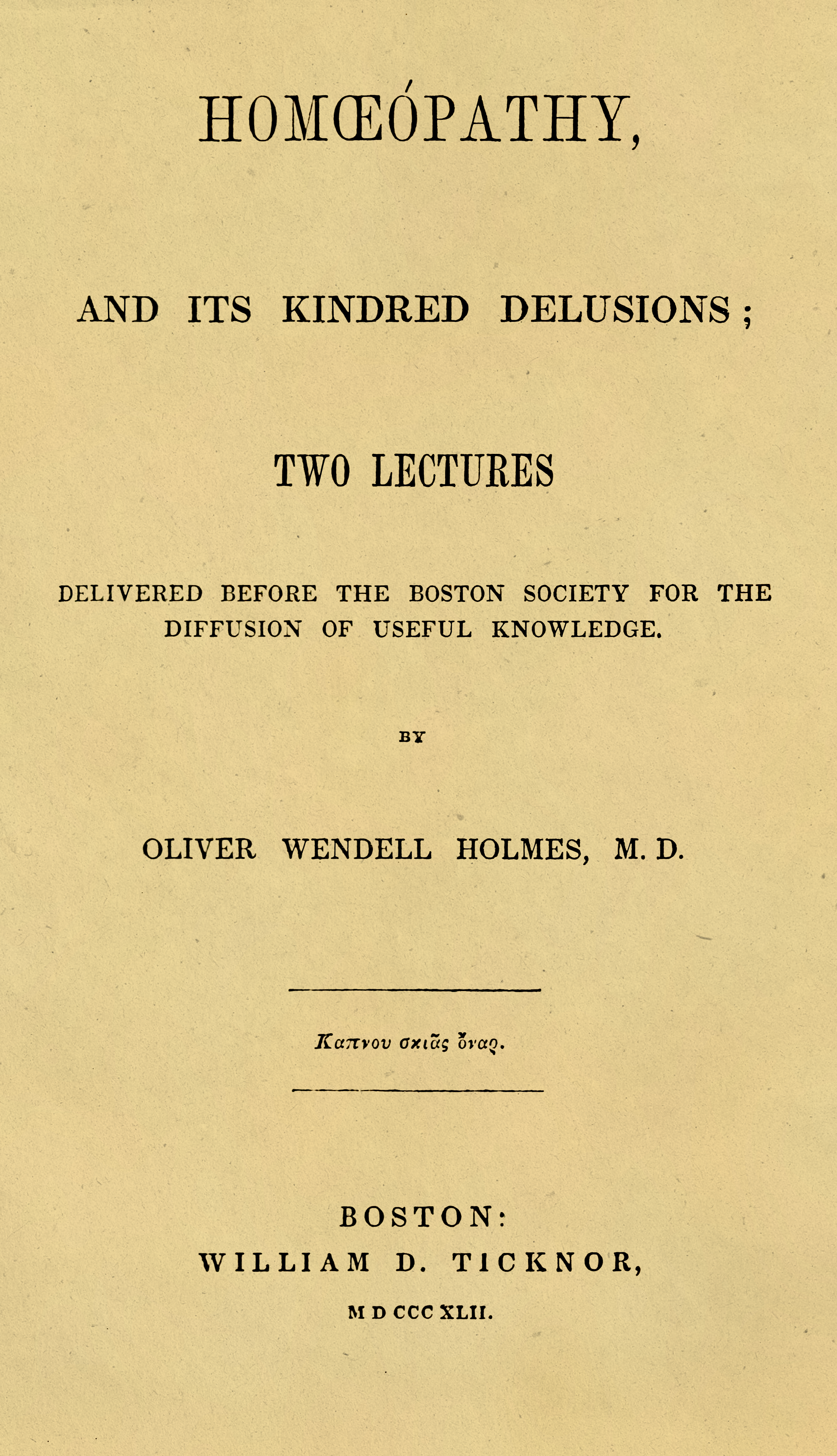
- Title page
- Author: Oliver Wendell Holmes Sr.
- Language: English
- Subject: Pseudomedicine
- Publisher: William D. Ticknor
- Publication date: 1842
- Publication place: United States
- Pages: 90
- Text: Homœopathy and Its Kindred Delusions at Wikisource

Homœopathy and Its Kindred Delusions is a work by Oliver Wendell Holmes Sr., based upon two lectures he gave in 1842, Medical Delusions and Homœopathy. The work criticizes homeopathy, which he considered to be akin to "astrology, palmistry and other methods of getting a living out of the weakness and credulity of mankind and womankind". It is considered to be a classic text, one of Holmes' most important works, as well as one of the earliest criticisms of homeopathy.

== Synopsis ==
Homeopathy and Its Kindred Delusions is composed of two parts. In the first, Holmes explains how the placebo effect can produce false positives, and describes numerous forms of popular but ineffective quackery (including the royal touch, the tractors of Elisha Perkins, and the powder of sympathy), to demonstrate that positive anecdotal evidence is not necessarily indicative of an effective medical therapy. He also describes how Perkins claimed the healing powers of the tractors were due to their being made of a special alloy, but how they declined in popularity after it was discovered that the tractors had the same effect no matter what they were made of. In the second, he criticizes the basis of homeopathy itself, such as its theory of dilutions. Another issue is that of homeopathic provings (the practice of taking a substance to see what symptoms it causes). Holmes claims that during provings, subjects consider even the slightest discomfort (such as itching) to be the result of the substance, and that this method does not demonstrate symptom causality.

In the work Holmes also expressed a belief that "real advances were made only after years of work by highly trained men who cared little for fame and money".

== Reception ==
Homeopathy and Its Kindred Delusions received both praise and criticism after its release. In a series of letters titled Some Remarks on Dr. O. W. Holmes's Lectures on Homeopathy and Its Kindred Delusions; Communicated to a Friend, Robert Wesselhoeft negatively compared Holmes' work to writers that "made sport of their fellow man" and considered the work to be representative of "Old School medicine's continued scorn for reform". In contrast, Eric W. Boyle wrote in his 2013 book Quack Medicine that Holmes' work was "the most thoroughly explicated attack on homeopathy as a dangerous and deadly error".
