= Daniel L. Cease =

American publisher (1864–1928)

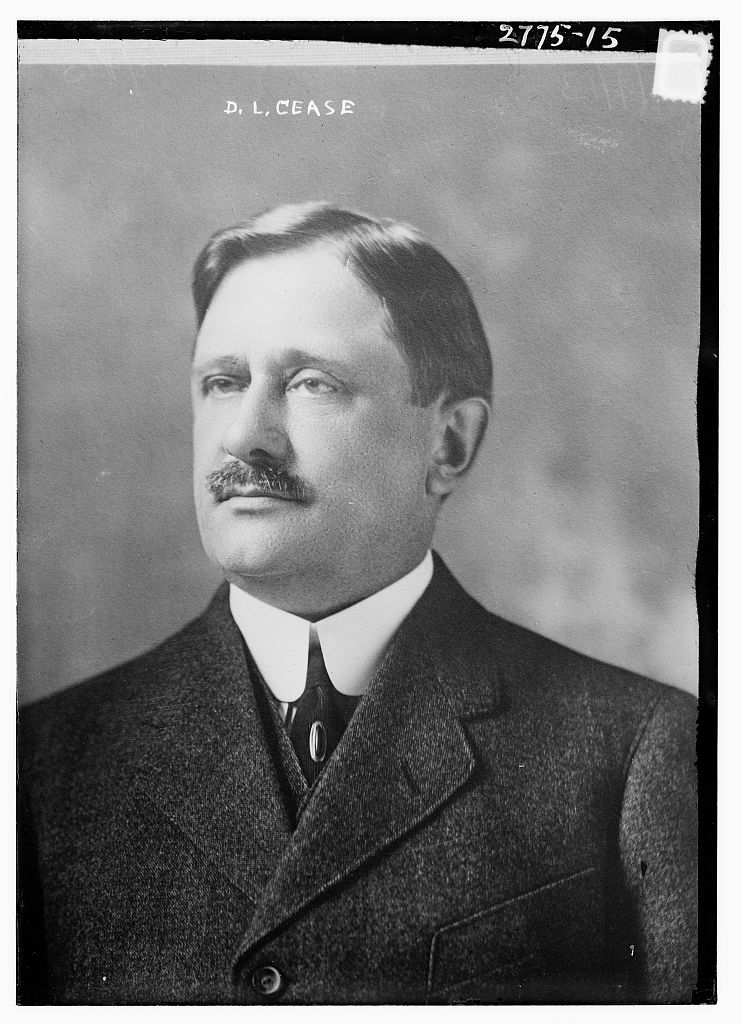

Daniel L. Cease (March, 25 1864 in Phillipsburg, New Jersey – March 22, 1928 in Cleveland, Ohio) was editor and manager of The Railroad Trainman in Cleveland, Ohio. The publication was a monthly published by the Brotherhood of Railroad Trainmen. In 1913 and again in 1926 he was on the Board of Arbitration of the Interstate Commerce Commission.

== Publications ==
- The Railroad trainman, Volume 29 (1912)
- Disability And Death Compensation For Railroad Employees (1913)

== See also ==
- Brotherhood of Locomotive Firemen
