= Homeoprophylaxis =

Use of homeopathy as a preventive medicine against infectious diseases

Homeoprophylaxis, or homeopathic prophylaxis, is the use of homeopathy, as a preventive medicine or immunisation against serious infectious diseases.

== History ==
=== Malaria ===
The concept came to wider notice in the UK after an undercover operation by the London School of Hygiene and Tropical Medicine, Sense about Science and BBC Newsnight in 2006. Posing as a traveller to countries known to be affected by malaria a researcher visited pharmacies in London and recorded her conversations with homeopaths who offered the incorrect advice that homeopathic remedies could protect against malaria. Dr Peter Fisher, the then Director of the Royal London Homeopathic Hospital (since renamed to Royal London Hospital for Integrated Medicine) told Newsnight that there was "absolutely no reason to think that homeopathy works to prevent malaria" and that "people may even die of malaria if they follow this advice."

Following the programme's broadcast the General Pharmaceutical Council (GPhC) began an investigation into some of the pharmacies involved but in 2011 announced it was dropping the cases citing improvements already made to prevent a re-occurrence and the cases not meeting the threshold criteria for a referral to the investigation committee.

=== Purported alternative to vaccines ===
In 2010 a BBC Scotland programme found that three of the six members of the Homeopathic Medical Association, based in Scotland, were offering homeopathic MMR 'vaccines' to parents.

In November 2014 the Canadian programme CBC Marketplace investigated the advice parents were being given in homeopathic practices in Toronto and Vancouver, finding that some "offered treatments, called "nosodes", created from biological materials such as pus, diseased tissue, bacilli from sputum or (in the case of "bowel nosodes") faeces", as vaccine alternatives, telling parents that the treatment is as effective as vaccines against diseases such as measles, polio and pertussis (whooping cough), which is highly contagious and can be fatal for infants", a practice described by Shannon MacDonald (a registered nurse and adjunct assistant professor at the University of Alberta) as "terribly irresponsible".

In December 2014, Australian Federal Court found that homeopathy supplier Homeopathy Plus! and its director Frances Sheffield, had engaged in misleading and deceptive conduct regarding both the effectiveness of the whooping cough vaccine and also implying that homeopathic alternatives were safe and effective in preventing whooping cough. In doing so they breached Australian Consumer Law.

An undercover investigation in May 2019 by The Times highlighted the continued problem of some alternative medicine practitioners in the UK offering homeoprophylaxis. The Society of Homeopaths responded to one of their members being included in the feature (as someone who has offered homeoprophylaxis) by lodging an official complaint to IPSO, the press regulator. The Society's position statement "does not endorse the use of homeopathic medicines as an alternative to vaccination for the prevention of serious infectious diseases" though, somewhat conflictingly, also suggests that "homeoprophylaxis may be effective in certain circumstances".

=== COVID-19 pandemic ===
On 14 July 2021 Juli Mazi of Napa, a California-licensed naturopathic doctor, was arrested for "her alleged scheme to sell homeoprophylaxis immunization pellets and to falsify COVID-19 vaccination cards by making it appear that customers had received the U.S. Food and Drug Administration (FDA) authorized Moderna vaccine." She is charged with one count of wire fraud and one count of false statements related to health care matters and is the first person to face a "federal criminal fraud prosecution related to homeoprophylaxis immunizations" or "for selling fake Covid-19 vaccination cards".

According to Deputy Attorney General, Lisa O. Monaco “This defendant allegedly defrauded and endangered the public by preying on fears and spreading misinformation about FDA-authorized vaccinations, while also peddling fake treatments that put people’s lives at risk. Even worse, the defendant allegedly created counterfeit COVID-19 vaccination cards and instructed her customers to falsely mark that they had received a vaccine, allowing them to circumvent efforts to contain the spread of the disease." The story has also been reported in the Courthouse News Service, Ars Technica, The Washington Post, The New York Times and NBC News.
