= Society of Homeopaths =

Group of homeopaths

The Society of Homeopaths (SoH) is a British private limited company formed in 1978 by "a small group of homeopaths who were keen to work together for the development of the profession and to ensure high standards in the practice of homeopathy" and at September 2018 had 997 members on the Society's register who can refer to themselves as RSHoms. The SoH's register was first accredited by the Professional Standards Authority (PSA) in September 2014 allowing members to display the Accredited Register's logo at the time. In January 2021 the PSA suspended the society's accreditation for failure to meet standards the PSA had set.

Homeopathy is a form of alternative medicine which is ineffective. Practitioners claim to treat patients using highly diluted preparations that are believed to cause healthy people to exhibit symptoms that are similar to those exhibited by the patient.

In July 2013, the Advertising Standards Authority (ASA) adjudicated against the SoH, finding that it was engaging in false advertising regarding claims of efficacy of homeopathic products and that at the same time discouraging users from seeking essential treatments for conditions for which they were needed.

In September 2016, the Compliance Team of the Committee of Advertising Practice (CAP) wrote to UK homeopaths "to remind them of the rules that govern what they can and can't say in their marketing materials, including on their websites". The SoH initially responded by offering "support and advice" to any member though in November 2016, after a Board meeting, the SoH sought legal advice on "the legitimacy of the ASA and the actions it is taking (in) pursuing homeopaths" though later determined that to "take further action would lead to huge costs with little chance of success."

In 2017, the PSA received concerns about SoH registrants claiming to treat autism with CEASE Therapy. In their decision to re-accredit the SoH, the PSA panel issued the Society with a condition to develop a position statement on CEASE, to ensure that registrants offering the therapy "follow the Society's position and do not breach its Code of Ethics and Practice", and review the risks relating to CEASE and other therapies. In June 2018, the Society of Homeopaths published their position statement advising their members not to imply any cure of autism when marketing CEASE therapy. It has been estimated that more than 120 homeopaths are offering CEASE in the UK, though not all are SoH members.

An undercover investigation in May 2019 by The Times highlighted the ongoing problem of some alternative medicine practitioners offering alternatives to vaccination ('homeoprophylaxis') despite there being no evidence that this works. The SoH responded to one of their members being included in the feature (as someone who has offered homeoprophylaxis) by lodging an official complaint to IPSO, the press regulator.

In April 2019, the PSA re-accredited the SoH and the Good Thinking Society (GTS), concerned about ongoing CEASE claims made by SoH members, filed a Judicial Review request into that decision in June 2019. In October 2019, the High Court gave permission for the judicial review to proceed.

The SoH was re-accredited with conditions in 2020. The PSA found that the society was unable to meet the conditions set out and suspended its accreditation in January 2021.

== See also ==
- British Homeopathic Association
- Faculty of Homeopathy
- Homeopathy in the United Kingdom
