= Anthony Campbell (physician) =

British doctor

Anthony Campbell is a retired British physician, homeopath, acupuncturist and author.

He was a consultant physician at The Royal London Homeopathic Hospital until he retired in 1998, and for many years was the editor of the British Homoeopathic Journal (now Homeopathy), the journal of the Faculty of Homeopathy.

Nonetheless, he is a skeptic about much of alternative medicine. Although a Fellow of the Faculty of Homeopathy who advises that a great many patients have found benefit from homeopathy, Campbell considers that its claimed benefits may be due to the placebo response and other factors unconnected with the medicines themselves, such as the consultation acting as a form of psychotherapy with a sympathetic listener. He is regularly quoted in discussions of homeopathy as a practitioner and skeptic.

His books on acupuncture are recommended as appropriate reading material for newly trained members of The British Medical Acupuncture Society.

== Bibliography ==
- The Sacred Malady (fiction). Chatto & Windus (1967)
- Seven States of Consciousness. Victor Gollancz (1973); HarperCollins (1973).
- The Mechanics of Enlightenment. Victor Gollancz (1975).
- The Two Faces of Homoeopathy. Robert Hale (1984).
- Acupuncture: The Modern Scientific Approach. Faber (1987).
- Getting the Best for your Bad Back. Sheldon (1992).
- Natural Selection vs Natural Medicine. Online Originals London (1997).
- Acupuncture in Practice: Beyond points and meridians. Butterworth-Heinemann (2001).
- Back: Your 100 questions answered. Newleaf (2001)
- Beating Back Pain. Mitchell Beazley (2004)
- Homeopathy in perspective. Lulu Enterprises (2008)
- Totality Beliefs and the Religious Imagination. Lulu Enterprises (2008)
