= Vicki Hyde =

New Zealand science writer and editor (born 1962)

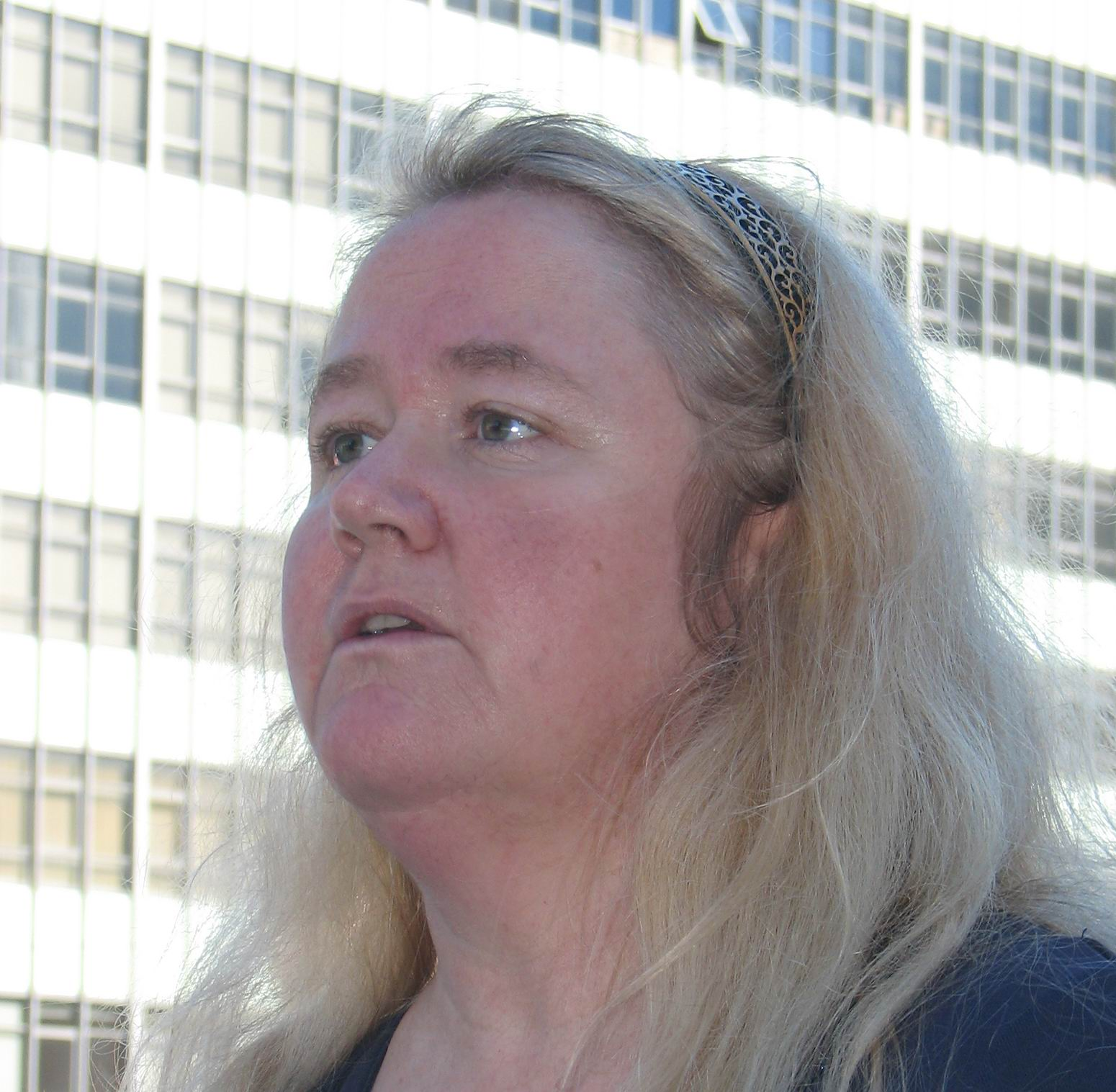
Hyde in 2010

Vicki Cathryn Hyde MNZM CRSNZ (née Spong, born 1962) is a New Zealand science writer and editor, and former chair-entity of the New Zealand Skeptics. She is co-owner with her husband Peter of a New Zealand-based software and web development company, Webcentre Ltd.

Hyde resides in Christchurch. She gained a BSc in psychology and a BA in sociology from the University of Canterbury and represented her alma mater in the television series University Challenge in 1980. She was the team manager the following year in 1981, when Canterbury won the title. She was a founder of the KAOS (Killing As Organised Sport) club at the University of Canterbury in 1981. Following her studies she lived in Japan before returning to New Zealand in 1989.

Hyde is best known as the managing editor of the popular science portal site SciTechDaily, which she began as a sister site to Arts & Letters Daily soon after the latter was launched in 1998 by her friend, Denis Dutton.

Hyde's company also worked with Dutton in 1998 to launch the Cybereditions e-book and print-on-demand publishing operation, which Webcentre owns outright.

Hyde was also founder and managing editor of New Zealand Science Monthly magazine which was published for the full decade from 1990 to 2000. During that time she authored Godzone Skies, Astronomy for New Zealanders and helped launch and market Webcentre's flagship TurboNote software. Hyde won the New Zealand Association of Scientists science journalism award in 1999.

She was the long-standing Chair-Entity of the New Zealand Skeptics (NZ Committee for Scientific Investigation of Claims of the Paranormal, Inc).

In her leisure time, Hyde can be found in an alternate persona as a Baroness of Southron Gaard, a branch of the international Society for Creative Anachronism.

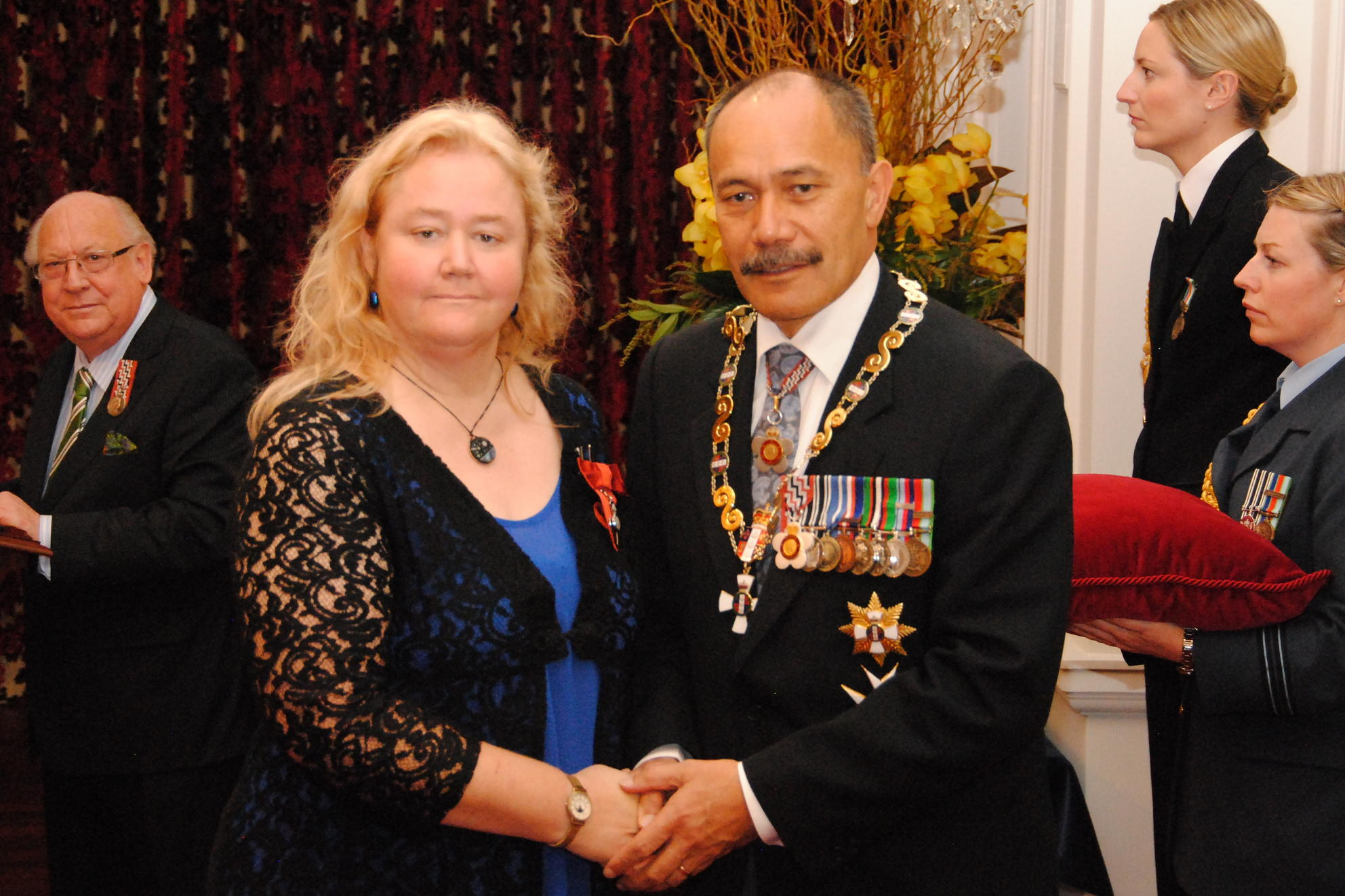
Hyde (front left), after her investiture as a Member of the New Zealand Order of Merit by the governor-general, Sir Jerry Mateparae, at Government House, Wellington, on 23 May 2013

In the 2013 New Year Honours, Hyde was appointed a Member of the New Zealand Order of Merit for services to science. She was elected a Companion of Royal Society Te Apārangi in 2001.

== Publications ==
- Godzone Skies, Astronomy for New Zealanders, (1992) ISBN 0-908812-19-1
- Night skies above New Zealand (2003) ISBN 1-86966-033-1
- Oddzone: Paranormal Phenomena, Alien Abductions, Animal Mysteries, Psychics and Mediums and Other Weird Kiwi Stuff, (2006) ISBN 978-1-86966-143-4
