= Michael Sofroniew =

American neuroscientist

Michael V. Sofroniew
- Occupations: Neuroscientist, physician, and academic

Academic background
- Education: M.D., LMU Munich; D.Phil., University of Oxford

Michael V. Sofroniew is an American neuroscientist, physician, and academic, most known for his work on the cell biology of injury and repair in the adult central nervous system (CNS). He is a Distinguished Professor of Neurobiology at the University of California Los Angeles (UCLA).

Sofroniew's lab investigates glial cell responses to CNS injury, disease, and tumors, focusing on astrogliosis, scar formation, and their roles in inflammation, tissue repair, and neural function. He received the Demuth Young Scientist Award from the International Brain Research Organization and has been named a Highly Cited Researcher in Neuroscience and Behavior by Web of Science, Clarivate, ranking in the top 1% annually from 2016 to 2024.

== Early life and education ==
Sofroniew was born in Detroit, USA and grew up and attended school in Los Angeles, Tokyo, and Munich. He earned an M.D. from LMU Munich in 1981, a D.Phil. from Oxford University in 1984, and completed a surgical internship at Johns Hopkins University Hospital from 1985 to 1986.

== Career ==
After his internship, Sofroniew became a lecturer in the Department of Anatomy at the University of Cambridge in 1986, and later serving as Reader in Neuroanatomy from 1997 to 1999. He served as a founding member of the Cambridge Centre for Brain Repair before joining the Department of Neurobiology at the David Geffen School of Medicine, University of California, Los Angeles (UCLA), in 2000, where he was appointed Professor and has held the title of Distinguished Professor since 2015.

== Research ==
Sofroniew has explored the cell biology of injury and repair in the adult and aging CNS, examining how astrocytes have modulated CNS inflammation, supported tissue protection and repair, facilitated axon regeneration, and sustained or restored neurological function following spinal cord injury, stroke, autoimmune disease, and neurodegenerative disorders. His work has combined transgenic mouse models with experimental approaches to CNS trauma, neurodegeneration, and autoimmune inflammation, and has been featured in media outlets, including Science Daily, SciTechDaily, Neuroscience News, Medical Xpress, and NIH News.

=== Spinal cord regeneration and repair ===
Sofroniew focused his research on understanding spinal cord injury repair, exploring how circuit re-connectivity can restore function and the factors needed for axon regrowth across severe SCI lesions. Regarding circuit re-connectivity, he and his group provided evidence that spontaneous SCI recovery can occur through newly formed propriospinal relay connections. They also challenged the view that astrocytic scars inhibit axon regrowth, showing instead that they support regeneration. Using transgenic loss-of-function models, they identified three missing factors in adults—intrinsic neuronal growth capacity, growth-supportive substrate, and chemoattraction—and demonstrated that their combined provision enables robust axon regrowth across SCI lesions.

In 2024, Sofroniew's team in collaboration with Gregoire Courtine and Mark Anderson at the EPFL in Switzerland, showed that simply regenerating axons after spinal cord injury is not enough for recovery; guiding them to natural targets with chemical signals is essential. This approach led to improvements in walking in mice.

=== Astrocyte roles in CNS neural protection and repair ===
Sofroniew and his research group made contributions to the identification of astrocyte functions in response to injury and disease. They identified the roles of astrocyte responses to injury using transgenic loss-of-function strategies. They found that astrocytes form scar borders around damaged CNS tissue, creating barriers that protect adjacent neural tissue, control inflammation, and repair the blood-brain barrier.

Sofroniew has authored or co-authored review articles covering nerve growth factor signaling, astrocyte functions, reactive gliosis, neurotoxic inflammation, spinal cord regeneration, and CNS diseases.

=== Astroglial diversity ===
Sofroniew's team developed early transgenic tools for cell lineage tracing and loss-of-function analyses of astroglia in vivo. Using these tools, they showed that a subpopulation of astroglia served as the predominant postnatal and adult neural stem cells (NSCs), while others regulated homeostasis and neural circuit function. This suggested that astrocyte dysfunction could contribute to CNS disorders. In collaboration with Baljit Khakh's lab at UCLA, they identified dysfunction of the astrocyte Kir4.1 potassium channel in Huntington's disease models, which affected striatal medium spiny neurons due to elevated extracellular K+ levels. Their findings highlighted that altered neuronal excitability in HD stemmed from changes in astrocyte-mediated K+ homeostasis.

=== Neurotrophic functions in adult CNS ===
In the 1950s and 1960s, research showed that neuronal survival relies on target-derived neurotrophic factors. This concept became the focus of Sofroniew's initial independent work when he established his lab in Cambridge, UK, in 1986. Alongside colleagues, he found that adult forebrain neurons atrophied and retracted projections in the absence of target neurotrophins, rather than dying. This contributed to the idea that neurotrophins regulate neural functions and plasticity throughout life, with their levels fluctuating in adults without causing neuronal death.

== Selected articles ==
- Faulkner, J. R., Herrmann, J. E., Woo, M. J., Tansey, K. E., Doan, N. B., & Sofroniew, M. V. (2004). Reactive astrocytes protect tissue and preserve function after spinal cord injury. Journal of Neuroscience, 24(9), 2143–2155.
- Sofroniew, M. V., & Vinters, H. V. (2010). Astrocytes: Biology and pathology. Acta Neuropathologica, 119, 7–35.
- Anderson, M. A., Burda, J. E., Ren, Y., Ao, Y., O’Shea, T. M., Kawaguchi, R., ... & Sofroniew, M. V. (2016). Astrocyte scar formation aids central nervous system axon regeneration. Nature, 532(7598), 195–200.
- Sofroniew, M. V. (2018). Dissecting spinal cord regeneration. Nature, 557(7705), 343–350.
- Burda, J. E., O'Shea, T. M., Ao, Y., Suresh, K. B., Wang, S., Bernstein, A. M., Chandra, A., Deverasetty, S., ... & Sofroniew, M. V. (2022). Divergent transcriptional regulation of astrocyte reactivity across disorders. Nature, 606(7914), 557–564.
