= Corbin Gwaltney =

American journalist and publisher (1922–2019)

- Born: Howell Corbin Gwaltney, Jr. April 16, 1922; Baltimore, Maryland, US
- Died: July 29, 2019 (aged 97); Potomac, Maryland, US
- Education: Johns Hopkins University (BA)
- Occupations: Journalist, publisher
- Employer: The Chronicle of Higher Education
- Spouse(s): Doris Jean Kell (m. 1946, div.); Jean Wyckoff (m. 197?, d.1990); Pamela Imburgia (2004-2019)
- Children: 3
- Uniformed service
- Allegiance: United States
- Branch: United States Army
- Service years: 1943–1945

Howell Corbin Gwaltney Jr. was an American journalist, publisher, and veteran. He is best known for founding The Chronicle of Higher Education. Over the course of his career he also founded and edited the Johns Hopkins Magazine and founded The Chronicle of Philanthropy.

== Early life and education ==
Gwaltney was born in Baltimore on April 16, 1922, to Howell Corbin Gwaltney Sr., a lawyer, and Margaret Gwaltney (née Bell), a homemaker. He decided to become a journalist in his youth after reading Ritchie of the News. After graduating from Baltimore City College, Gwaltney attended Johns Hopkins University, graduating in 1943.

== Career ==
After graduating from Johns Hopkins, Gwaltney worked for the Baltimore News-Post before enlisting in the U.S. Army in the middle of World War II. In December 1944, at the start of the Battle of the Bulge, Gwaltney was captured and taken as a prisoner of war by the Nazi army. After leaving the army, Gwaltney worked for Western Electric.

In 1949, Gwaltney proposed reimagining the Johns Hopkins alumni magazine, and convinced the university's provost P. Stewart Macaulay to agree and name him the editor in chief. The first issue launched the following year.

=== Chronicle of Higher Education ===
In 1957, Gwaltney met with ten other campus publication editors to plan the launch of a publication focused on the higher education industry. Initially called American Higher Education, the magazine sold 1.6 million copies in 1958. As the magazine grew, Gwaltney left his job at Johns Hopkins in 1959 to run Editorial Projects for Education, which owned the magazine. In 1966, EPE's board published the first issue of The Chronicle of Higher Education.

In 1978, Gwaltney and his business partner and co-founder John Crowl bought full control of the magazine from EPE for $2 million (nearly 10 million in 2025 dollars). Crowl later sold his stake to Gwaltney, giving him full ownership over the publication. Gwaltney stepped down as editor of The Chronicle in the late 1990s. Under his leadership, The Chronicle became the authoritative publication on the higher education sector.

Gwaltney also co-founded The Chronicle of Philanthropy in 1988 with Phil Semas, who was then managing editor at The Chronicle of Higher Education. In 2023,The Chronicle of Philanthropy separated from its parent company.

== Personal life ==
Gwaltney was married three times. He married Doris Jean Kell and had three children, Jean, Margaret, and Thomas, before the marriage ended in divorce. He then married Jean Wyckoff. The marriage lasted 17 years before Wyckoff died in 1990. In 2004, Gwaltney married Pamela Gwaltney (née Imburgia). After his death, his wife assumed control of The Chronicle.

The Society of Professional Journalists' annual award for the best collegiate newspaper is named for Gwaltney.
