= College Bowl =

American trivia game show

- Logo for the 2021 revival
- Genre: Game show
- Created by: Don Reid
- Developed by: Richard Reid
- Directed by: Carrie Havel (2021–22)
- Presented by: Allen Ludden; Robert Earle; Art Fleming; Pat Sajak; Dick Cavett; Peyton Manning
- Theme music composer: David Russo (2021–22)
- Country of origin: United States
- Original language: English
- No. of seasons: 3 (1979–82); 1 (1987); 2 (2021–22)
- No. of episodes: 20 (2021–22)

Production
- Executive producers: Richard Reid; Peyton Manning (2021–22); Cooper Manning (2021–22); Eli Manning (2021–22); Mark Itkin (2021–22); Harry Friedman (2022)
- Production location: Trilith Studios (2022)
- Running time: 30 minutes (1953–87); 60 minutes (2021–22)
- Production companies: Richard Reid Productions; Tough Lamb Media (2021–22); Village Roadshow Television (2021–22); Universal Television Alternative Studio (2021–22); Omaha Productions (2022)

Original release
- Network: NBC Radio
- Release: October 10, 1953 – December 14, 1955
- Network: CBS
- Release: January 4, 1959 – June 16, 1963
- Network: NBC
- Release: September 22, 1963 – June 14, 1970
- Network: Syndication
- Release: June 3, 1978 – 1979
- Network: CBS Radio
- Release: 1979 – 1982
- Network: NBC
- Release: May 23, 1984
- Network: The Disney Channel
- Release: September 13 – December 20, 1987
- Network: NBC
- Release: June 22, 2021 – October 28, 2022

College Bowl (which has carried a naming rights sponsor, initially General Electric and later Capital One) is a radio, television, and student quiz show. College Bowl first aired on the NBC Radio Network in 1953 as College Quiz Bowl. It then moved to American television broadcast networks, airing from 1959 to 1963 on CBS and from 1963 to 1970 on NBC. In 1977, the president of College Bowl, Richard Reid, developed it into a non-televised national championship competition on campuses across America through an affiliation with the Association of College Unions International (ACUI), which lasted for 31 years. In 1989, College Bowl introduced a (sponsored) version of College Bowl for historically black colleges and universities (HBCUs) called Honda Campus All-Star Challenge (HCASC) which is ongoing. In 2007, College Bowl produced a new version and format of the game as an international championship in Africa, called Africa Challenge (Celtel Africa Challenge, Zain Africa Challenge). The College Bowl Campus Program and National Championship ran until 2008.

In November 2020, NBC announced a revival of the show, developed from the format of Honda Campus All-Star Challenge and Africa Challenge, with Peyton Manning as host and a ten-episode run ordered. The revival, Capital One College Bowl, aired from June 22, 2021 to October 28, 2022.

== History ==
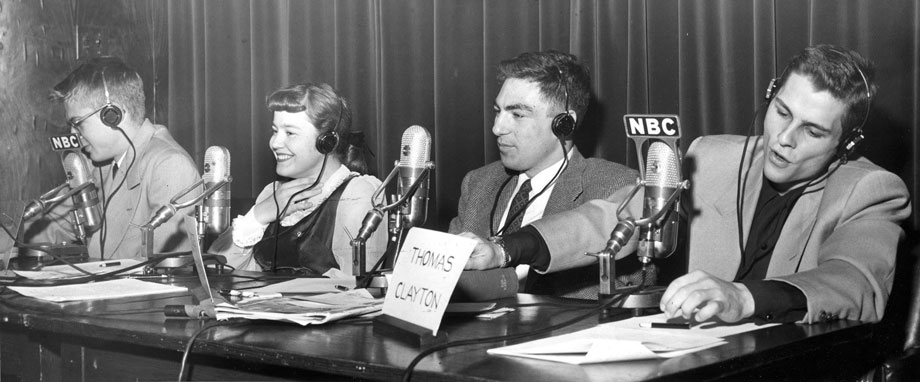
The University of Minnesota on the radio version of the College Bowl, c. 1953-54.

College Bowl originated as a USO activity created by Canadian Don Reid for soldiers serving in World War II. Reid and John Moses then developed the game into a radio show. Grant Tinker, later President of NBC and MTM Enterprises, got his start as an assistant on the show.

Richard Reid has led the College Bowl since 1975. He has created, produced, and supervised all versions of College Bowl innovated since then (except for a 1984 NBC special).

Two four-member teams representing various colleges and universities competed; one member of each team was its captain. The game began with a "toss-up" question for ten points. The first player to buzz in got the right to answer, but if the contestant was wrong, the other team could try to answer (if a player buzzed in before the host finished reading the question and was wrong, the team was penalized five points). Answering a "toss-up" correctly earned the team the right to answer a multi-part "bonus" question worth up to thirty points; the team members could collaborate, but only the captain was allowed to answer. The game continued in this manner and was played in halves. During halftime, the players were allowed to show a short promotional film of their school or they might talk about career plans or the like.

The first College Quiz Bowl match was played on NBC radio on October 10, 1953, when Northwestern University defeated Columbia University, 135–60. Twenty-six episodes ran in that first season, with winning teams receiving $500 grants for their school. Good Housekeeping magazine became the sponsor for the 1954–55 season, and a short third season in the autumn of 1955 finished the run. The most dominant team was the University of Minnesota, which had teams appear in 23 of the 68 broadcast matches. The 1953–55 series had a powerful appeal because it used remote broadcasts; each team was located at their college where they were cheered on by their wildly enthusiastic classmates. The effect was akin to listening to a football game.

== Television ==
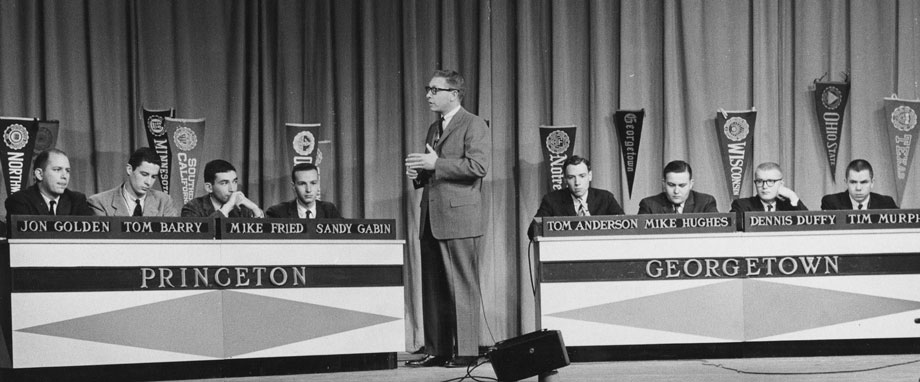
Allen Ludden hosting a match between Princeton and Georgetown University, 1959.

Former logo, taken from the 1966 intro.

Robert Earle hosting the College Bowl, c. 1960s.

Though a pilot was shot in the spring of 1955, the game did not move to television until 1959. As G.E. College Bowl with General Electric as the primary sponsor, the show ran on CBS from 1959 to 1963, and moved back to NBC from 1963 to 1970. Allen Ludden was the original host, but left to do Password full-time in 1962. Robert Earle was the moderator for the rest of the run. The norm developed in the Ludden-Earle era of undefeated teams retiring after winning five games. Each winning team earned $1,500 in scholarship grants from General Electric with runner-up teams receiving $500. A team's fifth victory awarded $3,000 from General Electric plus $1,500 from Gimbels department stores for a grand total of $10,500. On April 16, 1967, Seventeen magazine matched GE's payouts so that each victory won $3,000 and runners-up earned $1,000. The payouts from Gimbel's department stores remained the same so that five-time champions retired with a grand total of $19,500.

Colgate University was the first team to win five consecutive contests and become "retired undefeated champions," defeating New York University in Colgate's first appearance in April 1960 when NYU was going for its fifth win. Rutgers was the second college to win five contests and be retired. Colgate later defeated Rutgers in a special one-time playoff contest to become the only six-time winner in a "five-win-limit" competition. An upset occurred in 1961, when the small liberal arts colleges of Hobart and William Smith in Geneva, New York, defeated Baylor University to become the third college to retire undefeated. Pomona College began its five-game G.E. College Bowl winning streak on October 15, 1961, by first defeating Texas Christian University followed by the University of Washington, Hood College, Amherst College, and Washington and Lee University. In another surprise, Lafayette College retired undefeated in fall 1962 after beating the University of California, Berkeley for its fifth victory, a David and Goliath event. Ohio Wesleyan University retired undefeated easily beating Bard, Marymount, UCLA, Michigan Tech, and Alfred. Lawrence University went undefeated in 1964-1965, Another upset occurred in 1966 when the all-female Agnes Scott College from Georgia defeated an all-male team from Princeton University.

The show licensed and spun off three other academic competitions in the U.S.:

- Alumni Fun, which appeared on ABC and CBS TV networks in the 1960s and featured former college students
- Bible Bowl, which has evolved into at least three separate national competitions and used the Bible as a source
- High School Bowl, which was broadcast in some local TV markets and featured high school students

== Honda Campus All-Star Challenge ==
In 1989, College Bowl introduced its academic team championship for historically black colleges and universities (HBCUs) called Honda Campus All-Star Challenge (HCASC) sponsored by American Honda Motor Company. From 1990 to 1995, Honda Campus All-Star Challenge was broadcast on BET, featuring the top 16 HBCUs, survivors of regional tournaments, competing in a single-elimination tournament. The game was played under the same rules as College Bowl. Starting in 1996 and until the present, HCASC has been played as a live-event national championship. Originally, sixty-four HBCUs traveled to and competed at the national championship. Now, forty-eight schools travel and compete. Due to the pandemic, in 2020 the national championship was suspended and the 2021 version was a virtual event.

In 2011, HCASC adopted the Africa Challenge format of the game created by Richard Reid: the highlights of the format were three rounds of Face-Off (Toss-up) and Bonus questions played in categories followed by a catch-up round called the Ultimate Challenge.

== International versions ==
=== University Challenge ===
A British version of the televised College Bowl competition was launched as University Challenge in 1962. The program, presented by Bamber Gascoigne, produced by Granada Television and broadcast across the ITV network, was very popular and ran until it was taken off the air in 1987. In 1994, the show was resurrected by the BBC with Jeremy Paxman (who was also hosting Newsnight at that time) as the new quizmaster. In 2022, it was announced that Amol Rajan would be taking over as host, after Paxman announced that he was stepping down, owing to Parkinson's disease. Since 2011, a Christmas-time edition has also existed, titled Christmas University Challenge, featuring often well-known university alumni.

=== University Challenge New Zealand ===
University Challenge ran in New Zealand for 14 seasons, from 1976 until 1989, with international series held between the previous years' British and New Zealand champions in both 1986 and 1987. It originally aired on TVNZ 1 and was hosted by Peter Sinclair from 1976 to 1977 and again from 1980 to 1989. From 1978 to 1979, Sinclair was briefly dropped from the show and was replaced by University of Otago lecturer Charles Higham, Sinclair returned in 1980 and from 1981 to 1982, the show briefly moved to TVNZ 2, it moved back to TV1 in 1983 and remained on the network until the series original conclusion in 1989. The series was revived in 2014 by Cue TV and aired on Prime with Cue TV owner Tom Conroy as host and ran until its second conclusion in 2017.

=== University Challenge Australia ===
University Challenge, hosted by Magnus Clarke, ran in Australia on the ABC from 1987 until 1989. In the 1988 series, the University of New South Wales defeated the University of Melbourne in the final by 245 points to 175.

=== Africa Challenge ===
Launched in 2007, Africa Challenge was an international championship version of College Bowl featuring schools from across the continent that finished at the top of nationwide, non-televised championship tournaments. The format for Africa Challenge was created by Richard Reid. It featured three players playing three rounds of Face-Off and Bonus questions, and it culminated in a catch-up round called the Ultimate Challenge.

The program was sponsored by the mobile phone company Celtel, its headquarters in The Netherlands. In the first year, schools from Kenya, Tanzania, and Uganda competed. In the second year schools from Malawi and Zambia were added. In the third year, schools from Ghana, Nigeria, and Sierra Leone were added. After the second year, Celtel was sold to the mobile phone company Zain, headquartered in Bahrain. The name of the game changed to Zain Africa Challenge. Season five, which was set to be telecast in 2011, failed to make it past pre-production after Zain sold its African network operations to Bharti Airtel.

=== Challenging Times ===
An Irish version of the competition called Challenging Times ran between 1991 and 2002. It was sponsored by The Irish Times newspaper and presented by Kevin Myers, then a columnist with that newspaper. Throughout the show, University College Cork had the most wins, with three, while National University of Ireland, Galway qualified for the most finals, winning twice and placing second twice.

=== University Challenge India ===
University Challenge India started in summer 2003, with the season culminating in the finals of March 2004 where Sardar Patel College of Engineering (SPCE), Mumbai, beat Indian School of Business (ISB), Hyderabad. The 2004–2005 season finale saw a team of undergraduate engineering students from Netaji Subhas Institute of Technology (NSIT), Delhi, beat a team of management students from the Indian Institute of Management Kozhikode. The Indian winners of the 2003–2004 season went on to beat the finalists from the UK show, Gonville and Caius College, Cambridge. UC India is produced by BBC World India, and Synergy Communications, co-owned by Siddhartha Basu, who also hosted the show.

=== University Challenge in Belgium and the Netherlands ===
University Challenge inspired the format of two Dutch-language shows: De Universiteitsstrijd (Netherlands), which ran for one season in 2016 on NTR, and De Campus Cup (Belgium), which ran since 2019 on Canvas.

Country	Name	Host	Network	Date premiered
Africa	Africa Challenge	John Sibi-Okumu	Various TV networks	2007–2011
Australia	University Challenge	Magnus Clarke	ABC	1987–1989
Belgium (Flanders)	De Campus Cup	Otto-Jan Ham	Canvas (2019–2020, 2025–present); VRT 1 (2021–2023)	2019–present
Ireland	Challenging Times	Kevin Myers	Network 2	1991–2001
India	University Challenge India	Siddhartha Basu	BBC World India	2003–2005
Netherlands	De Universiteitsstrijd	Harm Edens	NTR	2016
New Zealand	University Challenge	Peter Sinclair (1976–1977; 1980–1989); Richard Higham (1978–1979); Tom Conroy (2014–2016)	TV One (1976–1980; 1983–1989); TV2 (1981–1982); Prime (2014–2016)	1976–1989; 2014–2016
United Kingdom	University Challenge	Bamber Gascoigne (1962–1987); Jeremy Paxman (1992–2023); Amol Rajan (2024–present)	ITV (1962–1987); BBC Two (1992–present)	1962–1987; 1992–present

== Later history ==
The game returned to radio from 1979 to 1982, hosted by Art Fleming, with the 1978 and 1979 national tournament semi-finals and finals appearing on syndicated television. The two champions from those years earned $5,000 for their school and competed against teams from the UK for a $7,500 grant in the "College Bowl World Championship," which was also televised. In 1978, Stanford defeated Yale with a score of 260–200 at the US Championships, earning the right to represent the US against a UK all-star team. The UK all-star team, composed of two students from Oxford, one student from Nottingham, and one from Durham, defeated the US team with a score of 385–55. The game played in 1978 between the US and the UK followed College Bowl rules. In 1979, Davidson College emerged as the winner of the US Championships and competed against Sidney Sussex College, Cambridge University under University Challenge rules. Once again, the UK team secured a win. There have been two television appearances since then; the 1984 tournament semi-finals and finals aired on NBC, hosted by Pat Sajak, and the entire 1987 tournament on Disney Channel, hosted by Dick Cavett. The University of Minnesota won both iterations.

In 1970, modern quiz bowl invitational tournaments began with the Southeastern Invitational Tournament, and the circuit expanded through the 1970s, 1980s, and 1990s. These tournaments increasingly made various modifications to the College Bowl format and came to be known as quiz bowl. Earlier invitational tournaments, such as the Syra-quiz at Syracuse University, had occurred in the 1950s and 1960s.

In 1976, the program became affiliated with the Association of College Unions International (ACUI), which continued to promote the competition as a non-broadcast event after the demise of the radio and television experiments. That affiliation ended in 2008, and the College Bowl campus program is no longer active. The College Bowl Company continues to create, produce and license versions of College Bowl in the United States and elsewhere, including Africa Challenge (2007–10), which featured schools from Ghana, Kenya, Malawi, Nigeria, Sierra Leone, Tanzania, Uganda and Zambia; University Challenge in New Zealand and India; University Challenge in the United Kingdom, which is seen every week in primetime on BBC 2; and the Honda Campus All-Star Challenge at historically black colleges and universities, sponsored by American Honda, which has awarded over $10,000,000 in institutional grants since its debut in 1989.

In the 1990s with the rise of the Academic Competition Federation and National Academic Quiz Tournaments, both with their national championships, several schools (such as the University of Maryland, the University of Chicago, both former national champions, and recent runner up Georgia Tech) "de-affiliated" from College Bowl. Factors that contributed to this process included, among other issues, eligibility rules for College Bowl (which limited the number of graduate students who could compete and required a minimum course load), higher participation costs for College Bowl relative to these other formats, and concerns regarding the quality and difficulty of the questions used in College Bowl competitions.

== 2021 revival ==
On November 24, 2020, it was announced that a 10-episode revival of the series had been ordered at NBC, with Peyton Manning as host (and producer) and his brother Cooper serving as sidekick. The revival, titled Capital One College Bowl, premiered on June 22, 2021. Twelve teams compete for $1 million in scholarship funds; each team fields four players, three starters and one alternate who can be brought in if a starter has to withdraw for any reason.

On April 28, 2022, NBC renewed the series for a second season, with Harry Friedman being named executive producer. The second season premiered on September 9, 2022.

=== Gameplay ===
From an episode of the 2021 version of College Bowl

The game is played using a modified version of the current Honda Campus All-Star Challenge rules, between two teams of three players, with no penalty for wrong answers. In each of the first two rounds, the teams are shown four categories. This round was known as the "Face-Off" in season one but was renamed the "Kickoff" in season two, with only one round being played. Each category contains one "Face-Off" question and two bonus "Follow-Up" questions, all worth 10 points each. The Face-Off questions are asked on the buzzers to all players, with no conferring allowed. The first player to buzz in and answer correctly wins control of the Follow-Ups, for which conferring is allowed. An incorrect response at any time gives the opposing team a chance to steal the points with a correct answer. In season two, a category that was used is replaced with a new one. One category is secretly designated as "Extra Credit," awarding 20 points per question if chosen. This was removed in the second season. Each of these rounds ends after three categories have been played.

A random draw decides which team will choose first in Round 1, and the trailing team at the end of this round chooses first in Round 2. During both rounds, the team that correctly answers the Face-Off question in a category earns the right to select the next one, regardless of the outcome of the Follow-Ups.

The second "Kickoff" round was replaced in season two by a new round dubbed "One-on-One," in which three categories, each with three questions, are shown and both teams determine who will participate. Correct answers are worth 20 points, while an incorrect response gives the opponent control.

The third and final round is the "Two-Minute Drill," in which each team has two minutes to answer as many questions as possible. In season one, teams chose their categories ("majors") from a group of six before the game began, and the trailing team went first. Teammates may confer on the questions, but only the captain may buzz in and answer. Each correct response scores 25 points, and a bonus is awarded after every fifth such answer, starting with 50 for the fifth and increasing by 25 for each additional set of five. The bonus was set to a flat 100 points in the second season.

Each qualifying contest consists of two complete games, with two new teams per game. The two highest-scoring teams from each contest advance to an eight-team elimination bracket, regardless of whether they won their respective games. The two highest scorers from the remaining six teams also advance as wild cards.

All matches beyond the qualifiers in the first season had three Face-Off rounds, with five categories available; each round ended when four of them have been played. The higher-seeded team in each match starts the first round. In season one, the Face-Offs were followed by a "Dropout Round," in which the host asks a question with multiple correct answers (e.g. naming the 30 teams in the NBA) and calls on one member at a time from alternating teams to respond. A miss or repetition of any previously given answer eliminates the contestant from the round. When called on, a contestant may challenge any one opposing team member to respond instead; if the opponent gives a correct answer, the challenger is eliminated. The first team to be eliminated must choose one of its members to sit out the Two-Minute Drill, while the opposing team plays the round with all three.

The "Dropout Round" was replaced in season two starting with the quarterfinals with a new round dubbed "The Handoff," in which three categories each feature a question with three correct answers. The trailing team goes first. Each correct response is worth 20 points, while an incorrect response moves on to the next teammate until all three chances have finished. Just like "The Knockout," a used category gets replaced with a new one. In subsequent turns, the contestant in the position corresponding to the question number goes first. The round ends after six questions.

In season two, a new round was added in between the quarterfinals and semifinals, called "The Blitz," consisting of the Kickoff and Two-Minute Drill. 3 matches are played, with the winner of each advancing to the semifinals, along with the runner-up team that scored the most points.

In the second season's semifinals, a new round dubbed "Pass-Play" was introduced. In this round, two categories are shown, and the controlling team chooses which one to play, with the remaining category being given to the opposing team. The trailing team goes first. Correct answers are worth 20 points, while an incorrect answer awards the opponents those points. The round consists of eight questions, with the latter half including two "Extra Credit" categories that not only double the points but also feature two answers.

The second season's finals consisted of the Kickoff, One on One, Handoff, Pass-Play and the Two-Minute Drill.

In season one, members of teams eliminated in the qualifiers, quarterfinals, or semifinals each receive $5,000, $10,000, or $15,000, respectively. In season two, members of teams eliminated in the qualifiers, quarterfinals, "The Blitz," or semifinals each receive $5,000, $10,000, $15,000, or $20,000 respectively. Members of the tournament champion and runner-up teams each receive $125,000 and $25,000, respectively. Alternates did not receive the same monetary award as their teammates. In addition, four contestants are chosen to receive $5,000 Merit Awards based on their character and leadership ability.

=== Results ===
==== Season 1 ====
The revival's first season took place over four rounds, with a qualifier round followed by a traditional playoff bracket including quarterfinals, semifinals, and a final.

After the end of the qualifier rounds, eight of the original 12 teams advanced to the quarterfinals. Listed by team name (seed), these were: Ole Miss (1), Tennessee (2), Michigan (3), USC (4), UCLA (5), Alabama (6), Columbia (7), and Auburn (8). Morehouse, UVA, Minnesota, and XULA were eliminated.

The quarterfinal results were as follows:

- Auburn (8) def. Ole Miss (1) 665–535
- Columbia (7) def. Tennessee (2) 925–510
- Alabama (6) def. Michigan (3) 860–540
- USC (4) def. UCLA (5) 760–500

For the semifinals, the remaining four teams were re-seeded based on their combined scores from the qualifier and quarterfinal rounds. The resulting order was: Columbia (1), USC (2), Alabama (3), and Auburn (4). USC was the only team to avoid being defeated by a lower-seeded opponent in the quarterfinals.

The semifinal results were as follows:

- Columbia (1) def. Auburn (4) 735–695
- USC (2) def. Alabama (3) 950–600

For the final, the team with the higher cumulative score in all previous matches (USC) won the right to choose the first category in Round 1. Columbia won the championship with a score of 790–775; team members Tamarah Wallace, Shomik Ghose, and Jake Fisher received $125,000 scholarships to put towards their college education, as did alternate Addis Boyd. USC's Ann Nguyen, Karan Menon, and Brendan Glascock, along with alternate Astrid, received $25,000 scholarships as the runner-up team.

==== Season 2 ====
The revival's second season took place over five rounds, with a qualifier round followed by a traditional playoff bracket including quarterfinals, "The Blitz," semifinal, and a final.

After the end of the qualifier rounds, twelve of the original 16 teams advanced to the quarterfinals. Listed by team name (seed), these were: Notre Dame (1), Oklahoma (2), Texas (3), Georgia (4), Washington (5), BYU (6), Penn State (7), Spelman (8), Syracuse (9), UC Santa Barbara (10), Columbia (11), and Duke (12). Ohio State, Florida, Albany State, and Morehouse were eliminated.

The quarterfinal results were as follows:

- BYU (6) def. Notre Dame (1) 650–605
- Georgia (4) def. Texas (3) 465–455
- Penn State (7) def. Oklahoma (2) 690–650
- Syracuse (9) def. Duke (12) 660–640
- UC Santa Barbara (10) def. Spelman (8) 530–445
- Columbia (11) def. Washington (5) 740–710

For "The Blitz," the remaining six teams were re-seeded based on their combined scores from the qualifier and quarterfinal rounds. The resulting order was: Penn State (1), Columbia (2), BYU (3), Georgia (4), Syracuse (5), and UC Santa Barbara (6). Penn State advanced to the semifinal, with the most points out of the runner-up teams.

The "Blitz" results were as follows:

- BYU (3) def. Penn State (1) 725–590
- Georgia (4) def. Syracuse (5) 565–540
- Columbia (2) def. UC Santa Barbara (6) 755–225

For the semifinal, the remaining four teams were re-seeded based on their combined scores from the qualifier, quarterfinal, and "Blitz" rounds. The resulting order was: Columbia (1), Penn State (2), BYU (3), and Georgia (4).

The semifinal results were as follows:

- Columbia (1) def. BYU (3) 925–590
- Georgia (4) def. Penn State (2) 805–610

For the final, Georgia won the championship with a score of 910–855; team members Layla Parsa, Aidan Leahy, and Elijah Odunade received $125,000 scholarships to put towards their college education. Columbia's Akshay Manglik, Albert Zhang, and Forrest Weintraub received $25,000 scholarships as the runner-up team.

== In popular culture ==
- In 2009, brief scenes from the early 1960s episodes of College Bowl with Allen Ludden appeared in the film Gifted Hands: The Ben Carson Story.
- A brief scene of GE College Bowl with Allen Ludden appeared in the 1982 film Diner.

== Criticism ==
In the 1987 regional tournament, College Bowl was accused of recycling questions from previous tournaments, thereby possibly compromising the integrity of results. Questions for tournaments need to be new for all teams involved, or certain teams could have a competitive advantage from having heard some questions previously. The 1987 National Tournament on the Disney Channel saw additional controversy, as several protested matches proved to strain the television format. Especially in the early 1990s, The College Bowl Company attempted to collect licensing fees based on copyright and trade dress claims from invitational tournaments that employed formats that it claimed were similar to College Bowl and threatened not to allow schools that failed to pay these fees to compete in College Bowl events. As it was, the company's intellectual property claims were never tested in court. These events and the growing Internet community of quiz bowl players led to a great increase in teams, tournaments, and formats.

== Top four finishers of CBI National Championship Tournament (1978–2008) ==
Year	Host	Champion	2nd place	3rd place	4th place
1978	University of Miami	Stanford University	Yale University	Cornell University	Oberlin College
1979	University of Miami	Davidson College	Harvard	Oberlin College	Cornell
1980	Washington University in St. Louis	Fresno State	Washington University in St. Louis	MIT	Washington St.
1981	Marshall University	University of Maryland	Davidson	Marshall	Michigan State
1982	New York University	UNC-Chapel Hill	Rice	UW-Madison	Vassar
1984	Ohio St.	University of Minnesota	Washington University in St. Louis	Princeton†	Vassar†
1986	Georgia Institute of Technology	UW-Madison	Princeton	Georgia Institute of Technology	Utah
1987	Orlando, Florida	University of Minnesota	Georgia Institute of Technology	NC State†	Western Connecticut State University†
1988	University of Illinois at Chicago	NC State	Emory	Princeton	Kent St.
1989	College of DuPage	University of Minnesota	Georgia Institute of Technology	Kent St.	George Washington University
1990	University of Minnesota	University of Chicago	MIT	George Washington University	Rice
1991	University of Illinois at Chicago	Rice	Cornell	University of Minnesota	University of Wisconsin
1992	George Washington University	MIT	Stanford	University of Pennsylvania	Cornell
1993	University of Southern California	University of Virginia	University of Michigan	University of Chicago	Harvard
1994	University of Florida	University of Chicago	University of Virginia	Brigham Young University††	George Washington University
1995	University of Akron	Harvard	University of Chicago	University of Michigan	Brigham Young University
1996	Arizona State	University of Michigan	University of Virginia	Princeton	Cornell
1997	Montclair St.	University of Virginia	Harvard	University of Oklahoma	University of Chicago
1998	University of Texas at Dallas	University of Michigan	Cornell	Stanford	Chicago
1999	University of Florida	University of Chicago	University of Michigan	University of Minnesota	Virginia Polytechnic Institute and State University
2000	Bentley College	University of Michigan	University of Arkansas	University of Chicago	Williams College
2001	California State University, Los Angeles	University of Michigan	University of Chicago	University of Texas at Austin	Cornell
2002	Kansas State University	University of Michigan	University of California, Los Angeles	University of Florida	University of Chicago
2003	University of Pennsylvania	University of Chicago	University of Florida	University of Rochester	UCLA
2004	Auburn University at Montgomery	University of Minnesota	University of Michigan	University of Florida	Georgetown University
2005	University of Washington	University of Minnesota	University of Rochester	Stanford	Truman State University
2006	University of Hartford	UCLA	University of Illinois at Urbana–Champaign	Washington University in St. Louis	University of Minnesota
2007	University of Southern California	University of Minnesota	University of Southern California	Williams College	Baylor University
2008	Macalester College	University of Rochester	University of New Mexico	University of Minnesota	The Ohio State University

Source: "NCT Results: Season = 1977-1978 to 2007-2008"

No tournament was held in 1983 or 1985, though regional tournaments were held each year.

†Tied for third (lost in semifinals, no playoff for third place).

††In 1994, Brigham Young University finished second in the round-robin, qualifying for the final series. However, as the final best-two-out-of-three series was held on Sunday, the team declined to participate, and the University of Virginia took their place instead. Brigham Young was awarded third place.
