= Tran Huu Dung =

American economist (1946–2023)

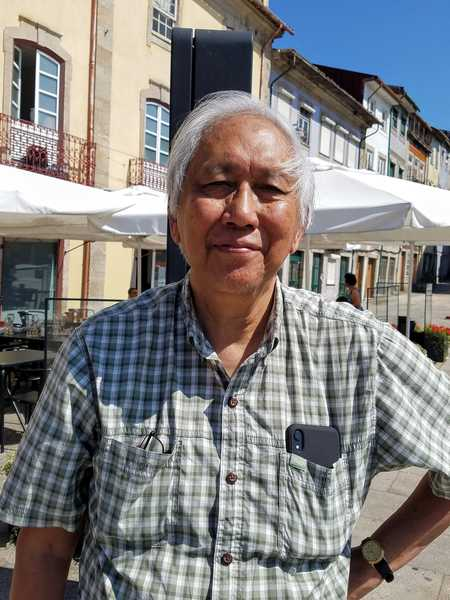
Tran Huu Dung

Tran Huu Dung (Vietnamese: Trần Hữu Dũng; 1946–2023) was a professor of economics at Wright State University in Dayton, Ohio. He was a specialist in the economies of East Asia, particularly Vietnam.

For more than twenty years, Dung (pronounced Zung) was also the managing editor of the web portal Arts & Letters Daily.

He received a Ph.D. in economics from Syracuse University in 1978.

== See also ==
- List of Vietnamese Americans
