= Arts & Letters Daily =

Web portal owned by The Chronicle of Higher Education

- Website type: Web portal and news aggregator
- Available in: English
- Owner: The Chronicle of Higher Education
- Website: aldaily.com
- Launched: September 28, 1998

Arts & Letters Daily is a web portal which links to news stories, features, and reviews from across the humanities. The site is owned by The Chronicle of Higher Education.

== Content ==
According to founder and former editor Denis Dutton, Arts & Letters Daily was inspired by the Drudge Report but was meant to reach "the kinds of people who subscribe to The New York Review of Books, who read Salon and Slate and The New Republic—people interested in ideas". Arts & Letters Daily has in turn been the inspiration for similar "idea based" blogs such as Abbas Raza's 3 Quarks Daily."

Robert Fulford characterized its value as follows:

"A & LD" does for ideas what the Bloomberg service does for commerce. It watches developments, sorts things out, tells you what you need to know. It doesn't produce the profits Bloomberg brings in, but over time its ability to make connections may turn out to be even more important than the stock market.

== Design ==
Arts & Letters Daily's layout, designed in July 1998 by Dutton, "mimics the 18th century English broadsheets and a 19th century copy of a colonial New Zealand periodical, the Lyttelton Times". Three columns of links dominate the site: Articles of Note, Book Reviews, and Essays/Opinions.

To the left of the main columns is a series of links to other online content providers, as well as a section titled “Nota Bene" (the Latin for "mark well"), which is the site's fourth and final collection of daily links to articles deemed to be of particular interest.

== History ==
Arts & Letters Daily originated from "Phil-Lit", a mailing list created in 1994 by Denis Dutton and D.G. Myers, which served as a symposium on articles and reviews found on the web. When the list reached eight hundred subscribers, Dutton suggested that the articles be put together on a single webpage.

Arts & Letters Daily went online in September 1998. Dutton was assisted in operating the site by three former Phil-Lit subscribers: Sharon Killgrove of the Mojave Desert; Harrison Solow of Malibu, California; and Kenneth Chen, then a student at University of California, Berkeley. Still in 1998, A&L Daily spawned a "sister site", SciTechDaily, run by Dutton's friend Vicki Hyde, a science editor and author whose web company hosted both sites.

By August 1999, A&L Daily was attracting 250,000 monthly readers and praise from USA Today, Wired, and The Observer; the latter called it the world's top website, ahead of The New York Times and Amazon.com. The site's high-profile led to a bidding war among several potential buyers, in which the online magazines Feed and Slate competed with The Chronicle of Higher Education, and Lingua Franca. Lingua Franca eventually became the owner.

In 2000, Dutton asked Tran Huu Dung, a professor of economics at Wright State University in Dayton, Ohio, to serve as managing editor of the website. Though Dutton and Dung had never met, the two had corresponded via e-mail.

In April 2002 The Webby Awards granted A&L Daily a "People's Voice Award" for Best News Website. By August, Lingua Franca had declared bankruptcy, and A&L Daily lost its only source of financial support. Dutton and Dung financed the site themselves until October 7, 2002, when A&L Daily went offline.

On October 25, 2002, The Chronicle of Higher Education purchased it along with "the assets of its parent company, which published the magazine Lingua Franca" - and A&L Daily came back online.

By March 2005 the site had attracted more than 2.5 million page views a month and was about to receive its 100-millionth impression.

In August 2007, PC Magazine included it among its list of "Top 100 Classic Web Sites", crediting the site for "pull[ing] together some of the most interesting reads available on the Web today".

On December 28, 2010, Denis Dutton died. The Wall Street Journal commented that A&L Daily sent "tens of thousands of new articles to readers whose readership might otherwise be painfully small".

Evan Goldstein of The Chronicle and Tran Huu Dung continue to produce the site.

== See also ==
- The Chronicle of Philanthropy
