= University Challenge (New Zealand game show) =

New Zealand game show

- Based on: College Bowl; University Challenge
- Presented by: Peter Sinclair (series 1–2, 5–14); Richard Higham (series 3–4); Tom Conroy (series 15–17)
- Country of origin: New Zealand
- Original language: English
- No. of series: 17
- No. of episodes: 204 in total; Series 1: 9; Series 2–14: 10; Series 15: 31; Series 16: 19; Series 17: 15

Production
- Producers: Wayne Cameron (series 1–5); Max Cryer (series 6–8); Derek Wooster (series 9–11); Brian Stewart (series 12–14); Sheree Carey (series 15–17)
- Production locations: Union Hall, University of Otago Student Union building (series 1); TVNZ Dunedin (series 2–14); SIT Centre Stage Theatre, Invercargill (series 15); Avalon Studios, Wellington (series 16–17)
- Camera setup: Split screen
- Production companies: TVNZ (series 1–14); Cue TV (series 15–17)

Original release
- Network: TV One (series 1–5, 8–14); TV2 (series 6–7); Prime (series 15–17)
- Release: 26 August 1976 – 5 November 1989
- Release: 22 November 2014 – 21 January 2017

University Challenge is a long-running New Zealand television quiz show, running originally from 1976 to 1989 before its revival in 2014 after a 25-year hiatus. The format was based on the British show of the same name, which was itself based on the American College Bowl. The 2014–2017 series were produced by Cue TV in Invercargill. The title holders are the University of Canterbury, who won the final series on 21 January 2017.

== History ==
At its inception in 1976, University Challenge was hosted by Peter Sinclair, though he was briefly dropped in the late 1970s and replaced by University of Otago lecturer Charles Higham. Sinclair returned after just two seasons, and continued in this capacity until the show went into hiatus in 1989. The first series was filmed in the Union Hall, in Otago University's student union building. Later series were filmed in TVNZ's Dunedin studio. It was sponsored by the BNZ, who provided prizes for some of the series. For example, one year, they gave each member of the winning team "an Apple Macintosh computer system, plus a BNZ campus pack account with a $500 credit balance". Ten episodes were aired each year, with the exception of the first season, when there were nine. Most seasons were broadcast on TVNZ channel TV One; those that were not screened on its partner channel TV2. When TVNZ's Dunedin studio was closed and TVNZ moved premises to Auckland, they decided to drop the show.

In July 2014, 25 years after TVNZ stopped producing University Challenge, Cue TV revived the show with station owner Tom Conroy as host. Some of the science questions were replaced with more populist material to enable greater involvement from the audience at home. It began airing on Prime in November 2014.

== Series overview ==
| Series | Year | Channel | Host | Winning team | |
| Series | Year | Channel | Host | University | Team members |
|---|---|---|---|---|---|
| 1 | 1976 | TV One | Peter Sinclair | University of Otago | Grant Liddell, Mark Allan, Dennis King, Bruce MacKay |
| 2 | 1977 | TV One | Peter Sinclair | University of Otago | Graham Pendreigh, Nicholas Dodd, Stephen Kennedy, Wayne McLachlan |
| 3 | 1978 | TV One | Richard Higham | University of Otago | Graeme Smaill, Robin St. Clair, Paul Corwin, Michael Jackson |
| 4 | 1979 | TV One | Richard Higham | University of Canterbury | Richard Surridge, Graham Buckley, Brian Wilson, Martin Browne |
| 5 | 1980 | TV One | Peter Sinclair | University of Otago | Jocelyn Brown (now Jaquiery), James McPetrie, Bruce Russell, Grant Holloway |
| 6 | 1981 | TV2 | Peter Sinclair | University of Canterbury | Liz Wilson, Jill Scott, Alistair Fletcher, Peter Clayworth |
| 7 | 1982 | TV2 | Peter Sinclair | Massey University | Bryan Kirk, Judith Bowen, Richard Major, Richard Rumball |
| 8 | 1983 | TV One | Peter Sinclair | Victoria University of Wellington | Daniel Morgan, Stewart Bartlett, Dean Sole, Jeremy Millar |
| 9 | 1984 | TV One | Peter Sinclair | University of Otago | James Dignan, Geoff Boon, Richard Soper, Nick Thompson |
| 10 | 1985 | TV One | Peter Sinclair | University of Auckland | Adam Lowe, Lindsay Diggelmann, Scott Mataga, Grant Shirreffs |
| 11 | 1986 | TV One | Peter Sinclair | University of Otago | Prudence Scott, Richard Nyhof, Camilla Owen, Clive Copeman |
| 12 | 1987 | TV One | Peter Sinclair | University of Auckland | Graham Coop, Sue Jensen, Charles Chauvel, Bruce Williams |
| 13 | 1988 | TV One | Peter Sinclair | University of Canterbury | Mark Wilson, Alex Lojkine, Jolisa Wood (now Gracewood), Tony Smith |
| 14 | 1989 | TV One | Peter Sinclair | University of Waikato | Keith Sircombe, Wendy Moffitt, Duncan Stewart, Stephen Brown |
| 15 | 2014 | Prime | Tom Conroy | University of Canterbury | Gerald Pfeifer (c), Rachael Harris, Daniel Redmond, Stewart Alexander, Liam Boardman |
| 16 | 2015 | Prime | Tom Conroy | University of Auckland | Alistair Kendrick (c), Hemanth Nair, Sana Oshika, David Parfitt, Lucy Harrison |
| 17 | 2016 | Prime | Tom Conroy | University of Canterbury | Stewart Alexander (c), Jack Hayes, Catherine O'Donnell-Jackways, Liam Boardman, Alexander Amies |

== Format ==
Waikato and Canterbury get set to face the questioning of Peter Sinclair (far right) during the 1986 series

As with the British show, "starter" questions are answered individually "on the buzzer", and are worth 10 points. The team answering a starter correctly gets a set of "bonus" questions worth a potential fifteen points, over which they can confer. In the last few series before the show's hiatus, a "jackpot bonus" was also available once per game, signalled by a bell. In that, each part of the bonus was worth five points, but getting all three parts right doubled the value of the question to 30 points.

An incorrect interruption of a starter results in a five-point penalty. The pace of questioning gradually increases through the show, becoming almost frantic in the last minute or so before the "gong" which signals the end of the game. In the event of a tied score at the sound of the gong, a "sudden death" question is to be asked (although in practice this has never occurred). In this circumstance the first team to answer correctly would be deemed the winner, with the process repeated until one of the teams answers correctly.

The format of the competition for its original run – with the exception of the debut season – was seven first-round matches, with each of the teams competing twice (having been randomly drawn against their opponents). Two semi-finals between the highest points-scorers followed, after which there was a single final match. In the first season, the first round consisted of three knockout heats, the seventh team then competing with the highest-scoring losing side for the last semi-final position. Unlike later series, the final in this series was staged over three legs.

For series 15, the competition was in a round-robin format. From series 16, the teams were divided into two pools.

Teams consist of four members, each team representing a New Zealand university. In the revived series, each team also has a reserve member. All six of the universities in New Zealand at the time competed (Auckland, Canterbury, Massey, Otago, Victoria and Waikato), along with a seventh team, representing Lincoln College (now Lincoln University). From series 15, the Auckland University of Technology also competes.

During the original run of 14 series, shows were half an hour in length, with question time being approximately 27 minutes during the first 13 seasons, and 21 minutes during the last season (the show was reduced to 25 minutes in length for this season). The show would occupy a mid-evening spot, generally around 8pm. This same spot was also occupied by the annual quiz series Mastermind, also hosted by Peter Sinclair, with University Challenge commencing one week after the Mastermind final.

The show is broadcast in a split screen format, which led to a widespread rumour in the 1980s that the set was constructed so that one team was seated immediately above the other.

== Notable contestants ==
Several team members from University Challenge have gone on to make a name for themselves in other fields, among them:

from the University of Auckland

- Charles Chauvel, MP
- Annette Morgan, winner of the New Zealand version of Mastermind in 1991

from the University of Canterbury

- Vicki Hyde (née Spong), science writer
- Jolisa Gracewood (née Wood), journalist

from the University of Otago

- Hamish McDouall, winner of the New Zealand version of Mastermind, political candidate
- Bruce Russell, musician
- Prudence Scott, Rhodes scholar
- Kathryn Tyrie, musician
- Mark Allan, winner of the New Zealand version of Mastermind

== Original run, 1976–1989 ==
=== Series 1 ===
The first series was filmed in Dunedin and screened on TV One in 1976. Unlike other series, it consisted of four knockout heats (the highest-scoring loser of the first three heats competed again, against the seventh university), and the final was held over three legs. The series was hosted by Peter Sinclair and produced by Wayne Cameron. The University of Otago won the series, defeating the University of Canterbury in the finals.

| Episode | Broadcast date | Team 1 | Score | | Team 2 |
Heats
| 1 | 26 August 1976 | Otago | ? | ? | Unknown |
| 2 | 2 September 1976 | Auckland | ? | ? | Unknown |
| 3 | 9 September 1976 | Unknown | | | |
| 4 | 16 September 1976 | Canterbury | ? | ? | Massey |
Semi-finals
| 5 | 23 September 1976 | Otago | ? | ? | Unknown |
| 6 | 30 September 1976 | Canterbury | ? | ? | Auckland |
Final (three legs)
| 7–9 | 7, 14, 21 October 1976 | Otago | 2 | 1 | Canterbury |

=== Series 2 ===
The second series was filmed in Dunedin in August 1977 and screened later in the same year on TV One. The University of Otago won the series, defeating Massey University in the finals.

| Episode | Broadcast date | Team 1 | Score | | Team 2 |
Heats
| 1 | 6 September 1977 | Unknown | | | |
| 2 | 13 September 1977 | Unknown | | | |
| 3 | 20 September 1977 | Unknown | | | |
| 4 | 27 September 1977 | Unknown | | | |
| 5 | 4 October 1977 | Unknown | | | |
| 6 | 11 October 1977 | Otago | | | Victoria |
| 7 | 18 October 1977 | Unknown | | | |
Semi-finals
| 8 | 25 October 1977 | Massey | ? | ? | Unknown |
| 9 | 1 November 1977 | Otago | ? | ? | Canterbury |
Final
| 10 | 8 November 1977 | Otago | ? | ? | Massey |

=== Series 3 ===
The third series was filmed in Dunedin on 18–21 August 1978 and screened later in the same year on TV One. The series was the first one to be presented by Richard Higham. The University of Otago won the series, defeating Victoria University of Wellington in the finals.

| Episode | Broadcast date | Team 1 | Score | | Team 2 |
Heats
| 1 | 5 September 1978 | Massey | 40 | 290 | Victoria |
| 2 | 12 September 1978 | Otago | 225 | 185 | Canterbury |
| 3 | 19 September 1978 | Waikato | 75 | 285 | Auckland |
| 4 | 26 September 1978 | Lincoln | 240 | 60 | Massey |
| 5 | 3 October 1978 | Victoria | 220 | 245 | Otago |
| 6 | 10 October 1978 | Canterbury | 235 | 110 | Waikato |
| 7 | 17 October 1978 | Auckland | 190 | 170 | Lincoln |
Semi-finals
| 8 | 24 October 1978 | Victoria | ? | ? | Canterbury |
| 9 | 31 October 1978 | Otago | ? | ? | Auckland |
Final
| 10 | 7 November 1978 | Otago | ? | ? | Victoria |

=== Series 4 ===
The fourth series was filmed in Dunedin in August 1979 and screened later in the same year on TV One. The University of Canterbury won the series, defeating the University of Auckland in the finals.

| Episode | Broadcast date | Team 1 | Score | | Team 2 |
Heats
| 1 | 18 September 1979 | Otago | 135 | 205 | Auckland |
| 2 | 25 September 1979 | Waikato | 130 | 285 | Victoria |
| 3 | 2 October 1979 | Massey | 215 | 175 | Canterbury |
| 4 | 9 October 1979 | Lincoln | 140 | 180 | Otago |
| 5 | 16 October 1979 | Auckland | 200 | 140 | Waikato |
| 6 | 23 October 1979 | Victoria | 185 | 275 | Massey |
| 7 | 30 October 1979 | Canterbury | 355 | 5 | Lincoln |
Semi-finals
| 8 | 6 November 1979 | Auckland | 275 | 225 | Massey |
| 9 | 13 November 1979 | Canterbury | ? | ? | Victoria |
Final
| 10 | 20 November 1979 | Canterbury | ? | ? | Auckland |

=== Series 5 ===
The fifth series was filmed in Dunedin in August 1980 and screened later in the same year on TV One. Peter Sinclair returned as host. The University of Otago won the series, defeating Victoria University of Wellington in the finals.

| Episode | Broadcast date | Team 1 | Score | | Team 2 |
Heats
| 1 | 17 October 1980 | Otago | | | Canterbury |
| 2 | 24 October 1980 | Victoria | | | Lincoln |
| 3 | 31 October 1980 | Auckland | | | Massey |
| 4 | 7 November 1980 | Waikato | | | Otago |
| 5 | 14 November 1980 | Canterbury | | | Victoria |
| 6 | 21 November 1980 | Lincoln | | | Auckland |
| 7 | 28 November 1980 | Massey | | | Waikato |
Semi-finals
| 8 | 5 December 1980 | Otago | ? | ? | Auckland |
| 9 | 12 December 1980 | Victoria | ? | ? | Massey |
Final
| 10 | 19 December 1980 | Otago | ? | ? | Victoria |

=== Series 6 ===
The sixth series was filmed in Dunedin in August 1981 and screened later in the same year. Unlike previous series, the 1981 edition screened on TV One's sister channel, TV2. The series was produced by Max Cryer. The University of Canterbury won the series, defeating the University of Otago in the finals.

| Episode | Broadcast date | Team 1 | Score | | Team 2 |
Heats
| 1 | 3 October 1981 | Massey | 130 | 235 | Canterbury |
| 2 | 10 October 1981 | Lincoln | 160 | 315 | Otago |
| 3 | 17 October 1981 | Auckland | | | Victoria |
| 4 | 24 October 1981 | Waikato | | | Massey |
| 5 | 31 October 1981 | Canterbury | | | Lincoln |
| 6 | 7 November 1981 | Otago | | | Auckland |
| 7 | 14 November 1981 | Victoria | | | Waikato |
Semi-finals
| 8 | 21 November 1981 | Massey | ? | ? | Otago |
| 9 | 28 November 1981 | Victoria | 160 | 195 | Canterbury |
Final
| 10 | 5 December 1981 | Canterbury | ? | ? | Otago |

=== Series 7 ===
The seventh series was filmed in Dunedin in August 1982 and screened later in the same year on TV2. Massey University won the series, defeating the University of Canterbury in the finals.

| Episode | Broadcast date | Team 1 | Score | | Team 2 |
Heats
| 1 | 25 September 1982 | Otago | ? | ? | Waikato |
| 2 | 2 October 1982 | Unknown | | | |
| 3 | 9 October 1982 | Unknown | | | Lincoln |
| 4 | 16 October 1982 | Canterbury | ? | ? | Otago |
| 5 | 23 October 1982 | Waikato | | | Unknown |
| 6 | 30 October 1982 | Unknown | | | |
| 7 | 6 November 1982 | Lincoln | ? | ? | Canterbury |
Semi-finals
| 8 | 13 November 1982 | Auckland | 170 | 210 | Canterbury |
| 9 | 20 November 1982 | Massey | ? | ? | Otago |
Final
| 10 | 27 November 1982 | Massey | ? | ? | Canterbury |

=== Series 8 ===
The eighth was filmed in Dunedin in August 1983, and returned to TV One, screening on Sundays later in the same year. Unusually, each university won one and lost one of their heats. This was the closest of all the original run of series, with three games decided by just five points. The final was low-scoring, due in part to the final being "Christmas themed" (for broadcast just prior to Christmas), something that none of the teams had prepared for or were aware of prior to filming. Victoria University of Wellington won the series, defeating the University of Auckland in the finals.

| Episode | Broadcast date | Team 1 | Score | | Team 2 |
Heats
| 1 | 15 October 1983 | Waikato | 135 | 185 | Canterbury |
| 2 | 22 October 1983 | Otago | 160 | 190 | Victoria |
| 3 | 29 October 1983 | Auckland | 170 | 175 | Massey |
| 4 | 5 November 1983 | Lincoln | 140 | 170 | Waikato |
| 5 | 12 November 1983 | Canterbury | 65 | 280 | Otago |
| 6 | 19 November 1983 | Victoria | 160 | 180 | Auckland |
| 7 | 26 November 1983 | Massey | 140 | 145 | Lincoln |
Semi-finals
| 8 | 3 December 1983 | Otago | 150 | 155 | Auckland |
| 9 | 10 December 1983 | Massey | 135 | 185 | Victoria |
Final
| 10 | 17 December 1983 | Victoria | 115 | 45 | Auckland |

=== Series 9 ===
The ninth series was filmed in Dunedin on 17–19 August 1984 and screened towards the end of the same year on TV One. The series was hosted by Peter Sinclair with booth announcer Hal Weston. The series was directed by Brian Stewart and produced by Derek Wooster. The University of Otago won the series, defeating the University of Auckland in the finals.

| Episode | Broadcast date | Team 1 | Score | | Team 2 |
Heats
| 1 | 21 October 1984 | Lincoln | 155 | 280 | Massey |
| 2 | 28 October 1984 | Auckland | 330 | 105 | Victoria |
| 3 | 4 November 1984 | Canterbury | 275 | 125 | Waikato |
| 4 | 11 November 1984 | Otago | 290 | 85 | Lincoln |
| 5 | 18 November 1984 | Victoria | 225 | 210 | Canterbury |
| 6 | 25 November 1984 | Massey | 105 | 320 | Auckland |
| 7 | 2 December 1984 | Waikato | 110 | 330 | Otago |
Semi-finals
| 8 | 9 December 1984 | Auckland | 300 | 120 | Canterbury |
| 9 | 16 December 1984 | Otago | 260 | 205 | Massey |
Final
| 10 | 23 December 1984 | Auckland | 190 | 280 | Otago |

=== Series 10 ===
The tenth series was filmed in Dunedin in August 1985 and screened later in the same year on TV One. The University of Auckland won the series, defeating the University of Canterbury in the finals.

| Episode | Broadcast date | Team 1 | Score | | Team 2 |
Heats
| 1 | 20 October 1985 | Victoria | 65 | 230 | Auckland |
| 2 | 27 October 1985 | Waikato | 125 | 220 | Canterbury |
| 3 | 3 November 1985 | Otago | 105 | 165 | Lincoln |
| 4 | 10 November 1985 | Massey | 210 | 100 | Victoria |
| 5 | 17 November 1985 | Canterbury | 175 | 155 | Otago |
| 6 | 24 November 1985 | Auckland | 220 | 95 | Waikato |
| 7 | 1 December 1985 | Lincoln | 160 | 135 | Massey |
Semi-finals
| 8 | 8 December 1985 | Massey | 100 | 265 | Canterbury |
| 9 | 15 December 1985 | Lincoln | 160 | 270 | Auckland |
Final
| 10 | 22 December 1985 | Auckland | 235 | 170 | Canterbury |

=== Series 11 ===
The eleventh series was filmed in Dunedin in August 1986 and screened between September and November on TV One. The series was presented by Peter Sinclair with John Jones replacing Hal Weston as booth announcer. The series was directed by Brian Stewart. The University of Otago won the series, defeating the University of Waikato in the finals.

| Episode | Broadcast date | Team 1 | Score | | Team 2 |
Heats
| 1 | 11 September 1986 | Otago | 225 | 200 | Waikato |
| 2 | 18 September 1986 | Canterbury | 235 | 210 | Victoria |
| 3 | 25 September 1986 | Massey | 65 | 245 | Auckland |
| 4 | 2 October 1986 | Lincoln | 130 | 230 | Otago |
| 5 | 9 October 1986 | Victoria | 70 | 280 | Massey |
| 6 | 16 October 1986 | Auckland | 145 | 180 | Lincoln |
| 7 | 23 October 1986 | Waikato | 160 | 275 | Canterbury |
Semi-finals
| 8 | 30 October 1986 | Canterbury | 185 | 240 | Otago |
| 9 | 7 November 1986 | Waikato | 250 | 200 | Auckland |
Final
| 10 | 14 November 1986 | Otago | 205 | 150 | Waikato |

=== Series 12 ===
The twelfth series was filmed in Dunedin on 19–21 August 1987 and screened towards the end of the same year on TV One. This series of the contest was unusual in that every one of the competing sides won one and lost one heat. The series was presented by Peter Sinclair with John Jones as booth announcer, and was produced and directed by Brian Stewart. Uniquely among the original run of the show, there was a two-week gap between the broadcasting of two heats, to allow for a television special to be played on 25 October. The University of Auckland won the series, defeating the University of Waikato in the finals.

| Episode | Broadcast date | Team 1 | Score | | Team 2 |
Heats
| 1 | 13 September 1987 | Canterbury | 225 | 180 | Otago |
| 2 | 20 September 1987 | Auckland | 210 | 140 | Victoria |
| 3 | 27 September 1987 | Lincoln | 140 | 110 | Waikato |
| 4 | 4 October 1987 | Massey | 130 | 115 | Canterbury |
| 5 | 11 October 1987 | Victoria | 160 | 130 | Lincoln |
| 6 | 18 October 1987 | Waikato | 195 | 110 | Massey |
| 7 | 1 November 1987 | Otago | 210 | 160 | Auckland |
Semi-finals
| 8 | 8 November 1987 | Auckland | 185 | 160 | Canterbury |
| 9 | 15 November 1987 | Otago | 105 | 140 | Waikato |
Final
| 10 | 22 November 1987 | Auckland | 245 | 85 | Waikato |

=== Series 13 ===
The thirteenth series was filmed in Dunedin in August 1988 and screened towards the end of the same year on TV One. The series was presented by Peter Sinclair with John Jones as booth announcer, and was produced and directed by Brian Stewart. The University of Canterbury won the series, defeating the University of Waikato in the finals.

| Episode | Broadcast date | Team 1 | Score | | Team 2 |
Heats
| 1 | 11 September 1988 | Otago | 225 | 200 | Waikato |
| 2 | 18 September 1988 | Canterbury | 235 | 210 | Victoria |
| 3 | 25 September 1988 | Massey | 65 | 245 | Auckland |
| 4 | 2 October 1988 | Lincoln | 130 | 230 | Otago |
| 5 | 9 October 1988 | Victoria | 70 | 280 | Massey |
| 6 | 16 October 1988 | Auckland | 145 | 180 | Lincoln |
| 7 | 23 October 1988 | Waikato | 160 | 275 | Canterbury |
Semi-finals
| 8 | 30 October 1988 | Otago | 185 | 240 | Canterbury |
| 9 | 6 November 1988 | Waikato | 250 | 200 | Auckland |
Final
| 10 | 13 November 1988 | Canterbury | 205 | 150 | Waikato |

=== Series 14 ===
The fourteenth and final series of the show's original run was filmed in Dunedin in August 1989 and screened towards the end of the same year on TV One. Episodes were 25 minutes in length, five minutes shorter than in previous series. The series was presented by Peter Sinclair with John Jones as booth announcer, and was produced and directed by Brian Stewart. The University of Waikato won the series, defeating the University of Auckland in the finals. Each member of the winning team won a Macintosh Classic. One still remains in the Waikato Students' Union Office as a trophy of their victory.

| Episode | Broadcast date | Team 1 | Score | | Team 2 |
Heats
| 1 | 3 September 1989 | Otago | 235 | 40 | Lincoln |
| 2 | 10 September 1989 | Victoria | 210 | 5 | Massey |
| 3 | 17 September 1989 | Waikato | 205 | 70 | Canterbury |
| 4 | 24 September 1989 | Auckland | 50 | 250 | Otago |
| 5 | 1 October 1989 | Massey | 85 | 175 | Waikato |
| 6 | 8 October 1989 | Canterbury | 90 | 180 | Auckland |
| 7 | 15 October 1989 | Lincoln | 120 | 175 | Victoria |
Semi-finals
| 8 | 22 October 1989 | Otago | 125 | 180 | Waikato |
| 9 | 29 October 1989 | Auckland | 155 | 130 | Victoria |
Final
| 10 | 5 November 1989 | Waikato | 115 | 110 | Auckland |

== International shows ==
Two international series were held in 1986 and 1987 between the British and New Zealand champions of the previous year. The first of these was held in Dunedin, New Zealand (the venue for the filming of the New Zealand domestic series); the second was held in Manchester, England. Each of these was a best of three series. Both series resulted in a win to the British team.

There was also a one-off match between the Australian and New Zealand champions in 1989, filmed immediately after the completion of the Australian filming in Hobart, Tasmania, resulting in an Australian win.

=== Results ===
| Year | Venue | Foreign Team | New Zealand Team | Result |
|---|---|---|---|---|
| 1986 | Dunedin | Jesus College, Oxford | University of Auckland | 2–1 to Great Britain |
| 1987 | Manchester | Keble College, Oxford | University of Otago | 3–0 to Great Britain |
| 1989 | Hobart | University of Tasmania | University of Waikato | Win to Australia |

== Revived series, 2014–2017 ==
=== Series 15 ===
The fifteenth series was filmed on 1–5 July 2014 and premiered on 22 November 2014 on Prime. It was in a new round-robin format, hosted by Cue TV director Tom Conroy and produced by Sheree Carey. Auckland University of Technology, newcomers to the show, lost all seven of their round-robin games. The final episodes aired on 4 April 2015, with the University of Canterbury winning the series after defeating the University of Auckland in the final.

==== Episode list ====
| Episode | Broadcast date | Team 1 | Score | | Team 2 |
Round 1
| 1 | 22 November 2014 | Waikato | 115 | 255 | Otago |
| 2 | 29 November 2014 | Auckland | 190 | 180 | Lincoln |
| 3 | 6 December 2014 | Victoria | 245 | 45 | AUT |
| 4 | 13 December 2014 | Canterbury | 205 (Note: The table at the start of episode 5 confirms a score adjustment applied after the show (a bonus on the deepest lake in New Zealand was wrongly given as incorrect).) | 90 | Massey |
Round 2
| 5 | 20 December 2014 | Victoria | 230 | 205 | Auckland |
| 6 | 27 December 2014 | Waikato | 140 | 170 | Massey |
| 7 | 3 January 2015 | Canterbury | 235 | 185 | Lincoln |
| 8 | 10 January 2015 | Otago | 210 | 105 | AUT |
Round 3
| 9 | 10 January 2015 | Canterbury | 165 | 190 | Victoria |
| 10 | 17 January 2015 | Otago | 265 | 185 | Auckland |
| 11 | 17 January 2015 | Waikato | 195 | 75 | AUT |
| 12 | 24 January 2015 | Massey | 130 | 150 | Lincoln |
Round 4
| 13 | 24 January 2015 | Otago | 90 | 220 | Canterbury |
| 14 | 31 January 2015 | Massey | 120 | 165 | Victoria |
| 15 | 31 January 2015 | AUT | 60 | 270 | Auckland |
| 16 | 7 February 2015 | Waikato | 145 | 125 | Lincoln |
Round 5
| 17 | 7 February 2015 | Massey | 60 | 280 (Note: The table at the start of episode 21 confirms a score adjustment applied after the show (scoreboard error, missing a correct bonus question on the name "Thatcher").) | Otago |
| 18 | 21 February 2015 | Auckland | 250 | 100 | Waikato |
| 19 | 21 February 2015 | AUT | 125 | 140 | Canterbury |
| 20 | 28 February 2015 | Lincoln | 180 | 265 | Victoria |
Round 6
| 21 | 28 February 2015 | AUT | 105 | 170 | Massey |
| 22 | 7 March 2015 | Lincoln | 200 | 225 | Otago |
| 23 | 7 March 2015 | Victoria | 260 | 140 | Waikato |
| 24 | 14 March 2015 | Auckland | 235 | 175 | Canterbury |
Round 7
| 25 | 14 March 2015 | Lincoln | 140 | 115 | AUT |
| 26 | 21 March 2015 | Waikato | 80 | 300 | Canterbury |
| 27 | 21 March 2015 | Auckland | 240 | 160 | Massey |
| 28 | 28 March 2015 | Victoria | 145 | 185 | Otago |
Semi-finals
| 29 | 28 March 2015 | Auckland | 300 | 120 | Otago |
| 30 | 4 April 2015 | Canterbury | 220 | 190 | Victoria |
Final
| 31 | 4 April 2015 | Canterbury | 210 | 155 | Auckland |

==== Round-robin ====
The following table should be read vertically. A green cell indicates a win, and a red cell indicates a loss. The number in each cell shows the points differential (the difference between the two teams' points). Two points were awarded for each win. The four teams with the most points at the end of the tournament went through to the semi-finals. Total points differential (shown in the bottom row) was used as a secondary ranking criterion in case multiple teams had the same number of points.

| vs. | Auckland | AUT | Canterbury | Lincoln | Massey | Otago | Victoria | Waikato |
|---|---|---|---|---|---|---|---|---|
| Auckland | —N/a | -210 | -60 | -10 | -80 | 80 | 25 | -150 |
| AUT | 210 | —N/a | 15 | 25 | 65 | 105 | 200 | 120 |
| Canterbury | 60 | -15 | —N/a | -50 | -115 | -130 | 25 | -220 |
| Lincoln | 10 | -25 | 50 | —N/a | -20 | 25 | 85 | 20 |
| Massey | 80 | -65 | 115 | 20 | —N/a | 220 | 45 | -30 |
| Otago | -80 | -105 | 130 | -25 | -220 | —N/a | -40 | -140 |
| Victoria | -25 | -200 | -25 | -85 | -45 | 40 | —N/a | -120 |
| Waikato | 150 | -120 | 220 | -20 | 30 | 140 | 120 | —N/a |
| Points | 10 | 0 | 10 | 4 | 4 | 12 | 12 | 4 |
| Points differential | 405 | -740 | 445 | -145 | -385 | 480 | 460 | -520 |

=== Series 16 ===
The sixteenth series was filmed in late August 2015 and premiered on 17 October 2015 on Prime. It was again hosted by Tom Conroy, and featured all eight of New Zealand's universities, which were split into two pools. Pool A consisted of Waikato and the three South Island teams (Canterbury, Lincoln, and Otago) and Pool B consisted of the remaining North Island teams (Auckland, AUT, Massey, and Victoria). The University of Auckland won the series, defeating the University of Canterbury in the final.

The first three rounds of the competition involved a round-robin within each of the pools. Round four consisted of cross-over games, where the first place team from Pool A played the fourth placed team from Pool B, the second from Pool A played the third from Pool B, and so on. At the end of round 4, the four teams with the most points went through to the semi-finals (with points differential as a secondary ranking criterion).

==== Episode list ====
| Episode | Broadcast date | Team 1 | Score | | Team 2 |
Round 1
| 1 | 17 October 2015 | Canterbury | 230 | 140 | Waikato |
| 2 | 24 October 2015 | Victoria | 430 | 15 | Massey |
| 3 | 31 October 2015 | Otago | 295 | 95 | Lincoln |
| 4 | 7 November 2015 | Auckland | 360 | 20 | AUT |
Round 2
| 5 | 14 November 2015 | Otago | 270 | 155 | Waikato |
| 6 | 21 November 2015 | Lincoln | 230 | 150 | Canterbury |
| 7 | 28 November 2015 | AUT | 65 | 125 | Massey |
| 8 | 5 December 2015 | Victoria | 295 | 220 | Auckland |
Round 3
| 9 | 12 December 2015 | Waikato | 285 | 125 | Lincoln |
| 10 | 19 December 2015 | AUT | 30 | 365 | Victoria |
| 11 | 26 December 2015 | Canterbury | 215 | 225 | Otago |
| 12 | 2 January 2016 | Massey | 55 | 345 | Auckland |
Round 4
| 13 | 9 January 2016 | Otago | 365 | 40 | AUT |
| 14 | 16 January 2016 | Victoria | 185 | 205 | Lincoln |
| 15 | 23 January 2016 | Canterbury | 295 | 45 | Massey |
| 16 | 6 February 2016 | Auckland | 370 | 100 | Waikato |
Semifinals
| 17 | 13 February 2016 | Otago | 170 | 215 | Canterbury |
| 18 | 20 February 2016 | Auckland | 435 | 70 | Victoria |
Final
| 19 | 27 February 2016 | Auckland | 345 | 95 | Canterbury |

==== Pool rounds ====
The following tables should be read vertically. A green cell indicates a win, and a red cell indicates a loss. The number in each cell shows the points differential (the difference between the two teams' points). For the inter-pool round, the opponent is written next to the differential score. Two points are awarded for each win. The two teams in each pool with the most points at the end of the tournament go through to the semi-finals. Total points differential (shown in the bottom row) is used as a secondary ranking criterion in case multiple teams have the same number of points.

===== Pool A =====
| vs. | Canterbury | Lincoln | Otago | Waikato |
|---|---|---|---|---|
| Canterbury | —N/a | 80 | 10 | -90 |
| Lincoln | -80 | —N/a | 200 | 160 |
| Otago | -10 | -200 | —N/a | -115 |
| Waikato | 90 | -160 | 115 | —N/a |
| INTER-POOL | 250 (Mas.) | 20 (Vic.) | 325 (AUT) | -270 (Auc.) |
| Points | 4 | 4 | 8 | 2 |
| Points differential | 250 | -260 | 650 | -315 |

===== Pool B =====
| vs. | Auckland | AUT | Massey | Victoria |
|---|---|---|---|---|
| Auckland | —N/a | -340 | -290 | 75 |
| AUT | 340 | —N/a | 60 | 335 |
| Massey | 290 | -60 | —N/a | 415 |
| Victoria | -75 | -335 | -415 | —N/a |
| INTER-POOL | 270 (Wai.) | -325 (Ota.) | -250 (Can.) | -20 (Lin.) |
| Points | 6 | 0 | 2 | 6 |
| Points differential | 825 | -1060 | -895 | 805 |

=== Series 17 ===
The seventeenth series premiered on 15 October 2016 on Prime. It was again hosted by Tom Conroy, and featured all eight of New Zealand's universities, which were split into two pools. Pool A consisted of AUT and the three South Island teams (Canterbury, Lincoln, and Otago) and Pool B consisted of the remaining North Island teams (Auckland, Massey, Victoria, and Waikato). The University of Canterbury won the series, defeating the University of Waikato in the final.

The first three rounds of the competition involved a round-robin within each of the pools. At the end of round 3, the four teams with the most points went through to the semi-finals (with points differential as a secondary ranking criterion).

==== Episode list ====
| Episode | Broadcast date | Team 1 | Score | | Team 2 |
Round 1
| 1 | 15 October 2016 | Victoria | 120 | 260 | Auckland |
| 2 | 22 October 2016 | Lincoln | 155 | 150 | Otago |
| 3 | 29 October 2016 | Massey | 145 | 245 | Waikato |
| 4 | 12 November 2016 | AUT | 195 | 205 | Canterbury |
Round 2
| 5 | 19 November 2016 | Auckland | 230 | 125 | Massey |
| 6 | 26 November 2016 | Canterbury | 220 | 70 | Lincoln |
| 7 | 3 December 2016 | Waikato | 205 | 195 | Victoria |
| 8 | 10 December 2016 | Otago | 155 | 120 | AUT |
Round 3
| 9 | 17 December 2016 | Auckland | 250 | 235 | Waikato |
| 10 | 24 December 2016 | Lincoln | 135 | 215 | AUT |
| 11 | 31 December 2016 | Massey | 120 | 280 | Victoria |
| 12 | 7 January 2017 | Otago | 125 | 290 | Canterbury |
Semifinals
| 13 | 14 January 2017 | AUT | 130 | 245 | Canterbury |
| 14 | 21 January 2017 | Waikato | 215 | 205 | Auckland |
Final
| 15 | 21 January 2017 | Waikato | 90 | 210 | Canterbury |

==== Pool rounds ====
The following tables should be read vertically. A green cell indicates a win, and a red cell indicates a loss. The number in each cell shows the points differential (the difference between the two teams' points). Two points are awarded for each win. The two teams in each pool with the most points at the end of the tournament go through to the semi-finals. Total points differential (shown in the bottom row) is used as a secondary ranking criterion in case multiple teams have the same number of points.

===== Pool A =====
| vs. | AUT | Canterbury | Lincoln | Otago |
|---|---|---|---|---|
| AUT | —N/a | 10 | -80 | 35 |
| Canterbury | -10 | —N/a | -150 | -165 |
| Lincoln | 80 | 150 | —N/a | -5 |
| Otago | -35 | 165 | 5 | —N/a |
| Points | 2 | 6 | 2 | 2 |
| Points differential | 35 | 325 | -225 | -136 |

===== Pool B =====
| vs. | Auckland | Massey | Victoria | Waikato |
|---|---|---|---|---|
| Auckland | —N/a | -105 | -140 | -15 |
| Massey | 105 | —N/a | 160 | 100 |
| Victoria | 140 | -160 | —N/a | 10 |
| Waikato | 15 | -100 | -10 | —N/a |
| Points | 6 | 0 | 2 | 4 |
| Points differential | 260 | -365 | 10 | 95 |
