= Honda Campus All-Star Challenge =

Quiz bowl competition for HBCUs

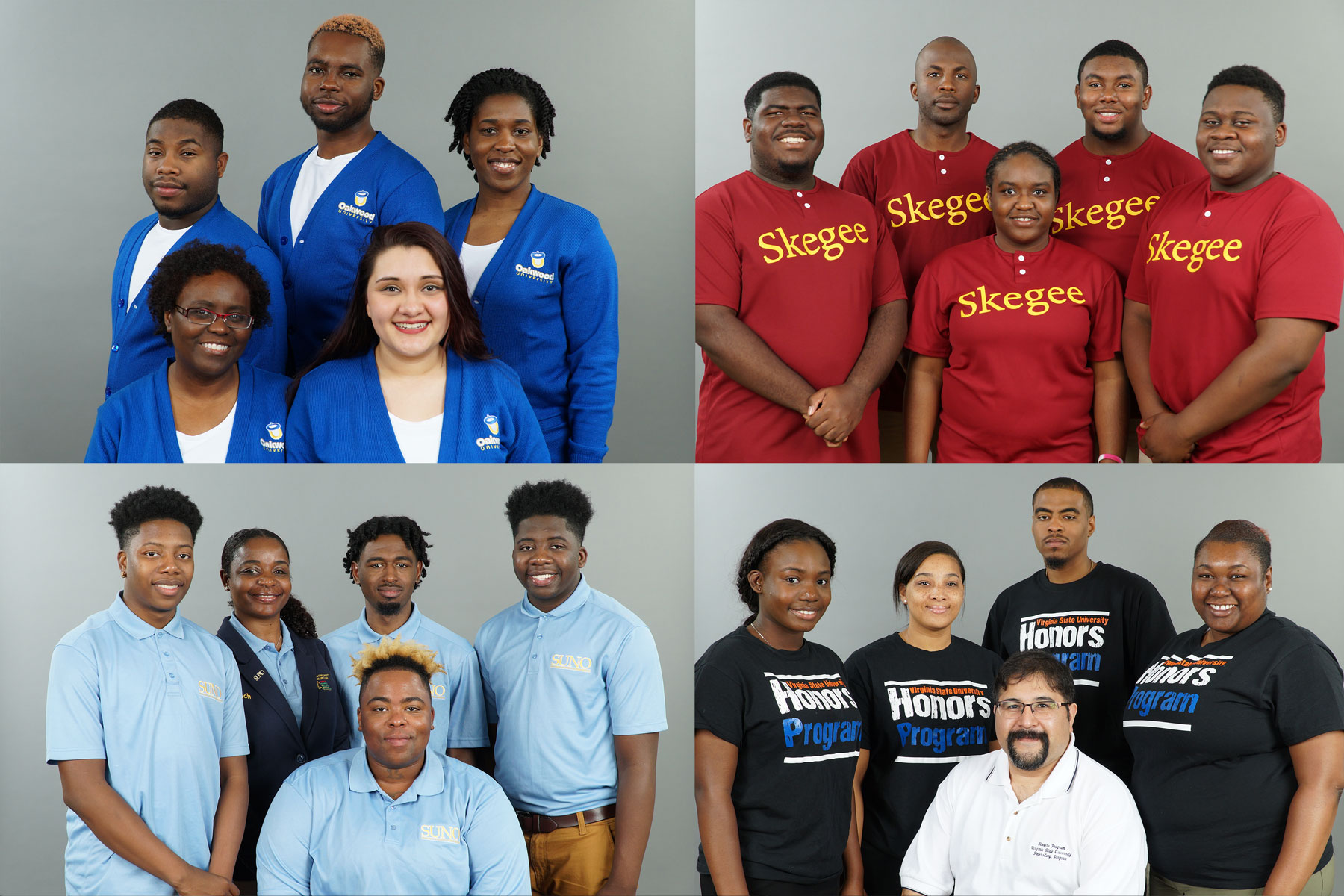
Teams from the 2019 National Championship Tournament.

Honda Campus All-Star Challenge (also known as HCASC) is a quizbowl academic competition for Historically Black Colleges and Universities (HBCUs). The game was created and co-founded by Richard Reid, president and owner of the College Bowl Company, which produces the program. The sponsor of HCASC is American Honda Motor Company. “HCASC exemplifies the aims of a liberal arts education by encouraging students to develop a mastery in multiple academic fields,” says Dr. Worth K. Hayes of Tuskegee University.

== History ==
Honda had Muse Cordero Chen, an advertising agency, do multiple focus groups in several major cities across the country to identify issues facing the African American community and their attitude towards Honda. One of the concerns they identified was African Americans wanted companies to be more responsive to the needs of their community, particularly with regards to education. Afterwards, education became a key element in Honda's advertising and public relations campaigns aimed at the African American audience. The agency helped Honda develop the Honda Campus All-Star challenge to help meet this need.

In 1989 Honda proposed a program to the College Bowl Company for HBCUs. College Bowl created a program in which all 4-year degree-granting HBCUs are eligible to enroll teams, and all participating HBCUs receive grants. From 1990 to 1995, the national championship games were broadcast on BET. These televised competitions were hosted by Clint Holmes. The college bowl type of competition became popular in the 60's and 70's, but it was rarely if ever, that African Americans were even allowed to compete in these tournaments. The HCASC was the first opportunity for black students to publicly display their talents, and airing the finals on cable television gave them an even larger audience.

== Game format ==
From 1990 to 1995, the competition format consisted of sectional matches that led up to televised National Championship games on BET. The current basic format was adopted in 1996, which abandoned the sectional games and the televising of games in favor of an all-encompassing 64-team National Championship Tournament (NCT) held each spring. From the 2010 to the 2019 season, sectional qualifying tournaments resumed and the national tournament field was reduced to 48 teams. In 2020, due to the COVID-19 pandemic, the tournament was canceled; it was played online via Zoom in 2021 and 2022. In 2023, the in-person national tournament was restored with a 32-team field.

=== 1989-2011 ===
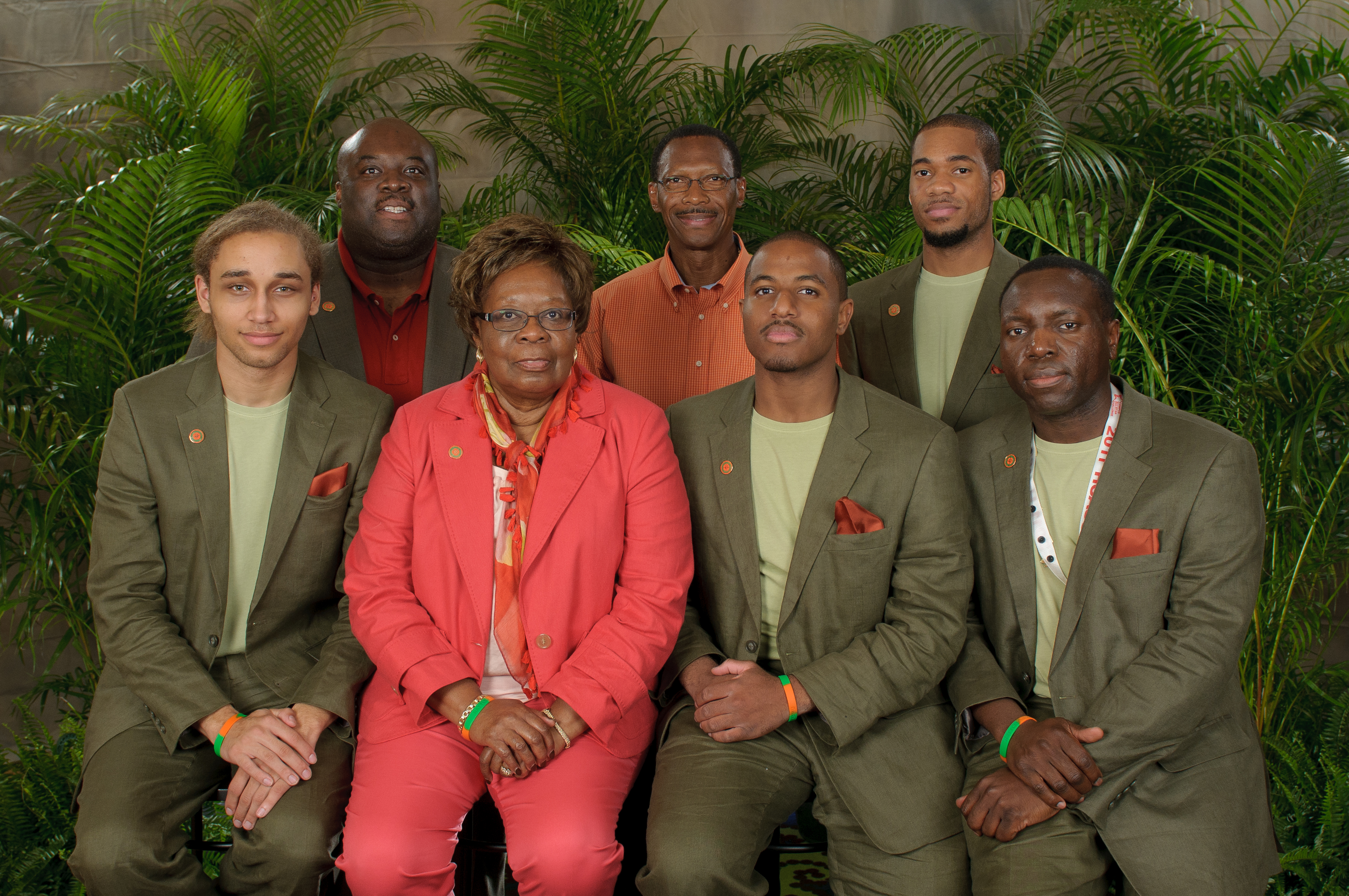
Florida A&M after their 2011 championship win in Orlando. This was the final year in which the championship was held in Orlando.

From 1989 to 2011, Honda Campus All-Star Challenge used the same gameplay structure as two of its sister shows, College Bowl and University Challenge.

Gameplay took place during two eight-minute halves and included toss-up and bonus questions. Toss-up questions were always 10 points in value and a correct response on a toss-up gave the team the right to answer a bonus question, which could be worth 20, 25, or 30 possible points. The toss-up questions did not permit conferring with other team members, with buzzers (using a lockout system) being used to designate who rang in to answer a question. Players could ring in before the moderator had completed the question (also known as an interrupt) but if an incorrect answer was given, the team would receive a five-point deduction, and the question was completed for the other team.

Teams could confer on bonuses, but responses were only accepted from the captain (or a designated player if the captain chose one). If team members had conflicting answers, then the captain would speak on behalf of the team. The bonus question might be one "all or nothing" question worth the full amount of the bonus, or could be a series of questions giving the team a chance to receive a portion of the maximum points (i.e. a 30-point bonus made up of three 10 point questions). Other bonuses might require a team to name items from a list at 5 points apiece, or award points based on how many clues it took the team to identify a famous person, place, or thing (a 30-20-10 bonus). Only the team who answered the tossup correctly got to answer the bonus question; there were no opportunities to "rebound".

At the end of two halves, the team with the higher score won the game. In case of a tie, toss-up questions were asked until there was a change in score (either one team answered correctly for 10 points, or interrupted with an incorrect answer, losing 5 points and the game.)

=== 2011-Present ===
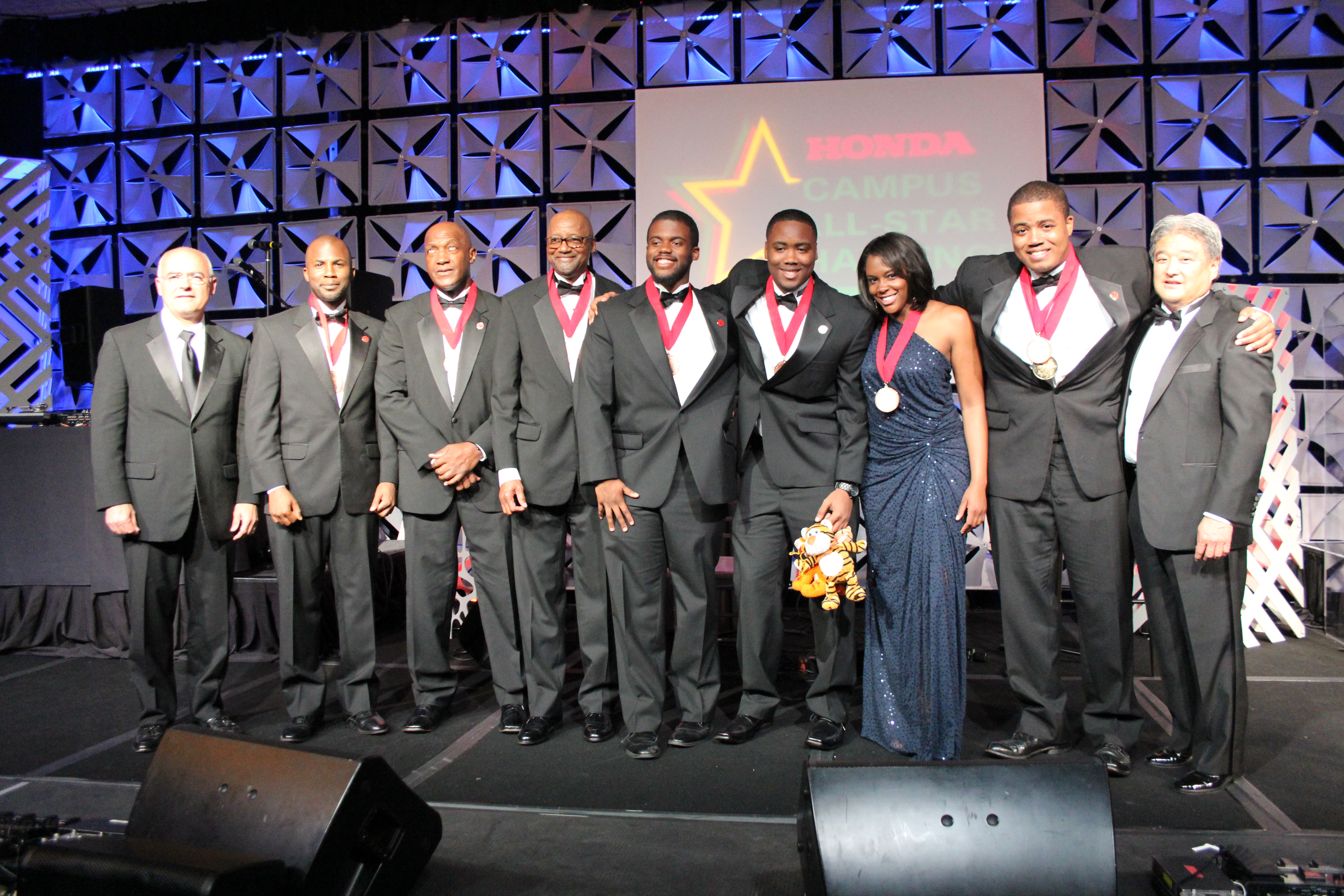
The Tuskegee University team receives their championship medallions.

Beginning with the 2011–12 season, the format was changed to reflect that of the Zain Africa Challenge, another academic competition created by Richard Reid, owned and produced by College Bowl.

Game play takes place over four rounds. The first three rounds are called Face Off Rounds. In each of the Face Off rounds, there are two types of questions: toss-ups, worth 10 points each and bonuses, worth 20 points. In each of the three Face Off rounds, a different player represents the team answering Face Off questions. That player is the only one who can ring in and answer for their team.

Each round has four categories in play. The team who wins a coin toss decides the first category. After the entire question is read, the first player to signal gets to answer. If that player answers correctly, their team gets a bonus question. If their answer is incorrect, the player representing the other team gets a chance to answer. Bonus questions come from the same category as their respective Face Off questions, are played by the entire team, and are always worth a possible 20 points. The team who answered the last correct tossup gets to choose the next category. In each category there are three face-off questions- once the third and final face-off question in a category is read, the category is out of play. At the beginning of Rounds 2 and 3, the face-off representative changes, and the team who is behind selects the category for the opening Face Off question.

At the end of the three Face Off rounds, teams play the final round, the Ultimate Challenge. The team that's behind plays first, and selects one of four new categories. The team has 60 seconds to answer 10 questions, each worth 50 points (originally 25). An incorrect answer is not penalized, but the moderator moves on to the next question, and as long as there is time remaining, teams can keep coming back to questions that they missed or passed on. After the trailing team plays, their opponents choose one of the three remaining categories to play. After both teams have played the Ultimate Challenge, the team in the lead wins. In semi-final and championship matches at the NCT, teams who sweep the Ultimate Challenge win additional grant money for their institutions.

If the team playing the first Ultimate Challenge does not accumulate enough points to bypass the team in the lead, the leading team still plays their Ultimate Challenge, except in playoff matches.

If there is a tie, the teams play Face Off questions until there is a change in score.

Personnel

- A moderator, who reads the questions
- A resetter, who opens and resets the lockout (buzzers) system as appropriate, This role is often held by the moderator.
- A scorekeeper
- A division team leader, who assists the game officials and teams, enforces procedural rules, and is in charge of the game room
- Two teams, each of up to three players and an alternate, with one player designated as captain
- Coach for each team
- A timekeeper (1990-2002); computer equipment made this position obsolete

== The National Championship Tournament (NCT) ==
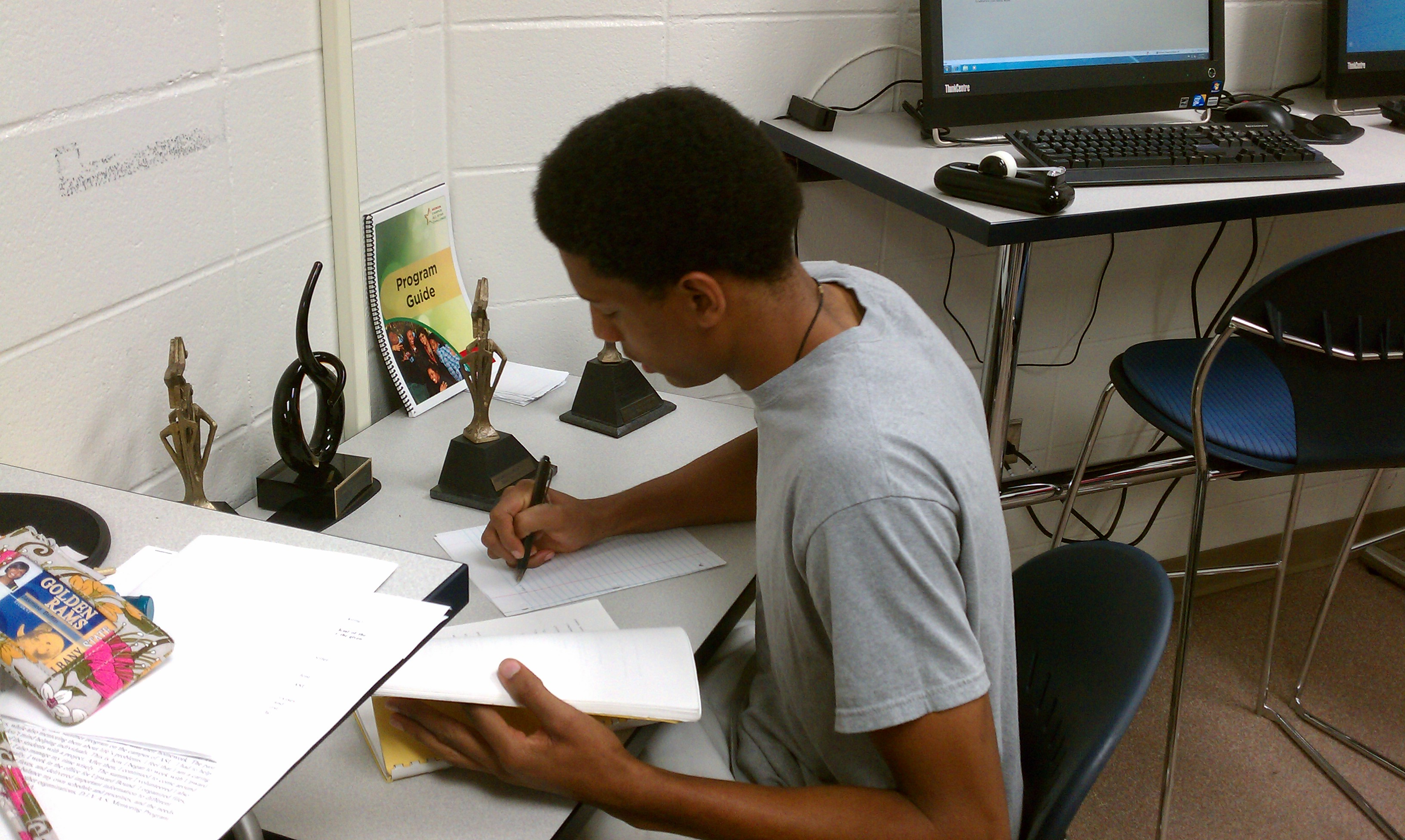
An Albany State student prepares for the qualifying tournament next to past trophies earned by his institution.

=== Qualifying stage ===
As part of a qualification process, each college/university must host a campus tournament to determine which players will represent the school's team. Schools must qualify for the NCT by competing in one of the National Qualifying Tournaments (NQT) that take place in February. 32 schools are chosen for the NCT based on their NQT performance and previous years' performance at the NCT. Schools may increase their chances of qualifying via other ways announced by HCASC officials, including service projects and "Rep My School" contests. Defending champions automatically qualify for the tournament.

=== The Tournament ===
After the NQTs are completed, qualifying schools compete at the NCT. Teams are placed into eight divisions and play a round robin tournament. The divisions are named after famous African Americans, with two of the eight divisions renamed each year. The preliminary round consists of divisional round robin games. The two teams from each division with the best win/loss record move onto the round of 16 playoffs. Teams are seeded based on overall performance, and the "super sixteen," "great eight," quarterfinal, and semifinal matches are single elimination, with the final two teams playing a best two-of-three series of final matches. Clint Holmes, who hosted the BET broadcasts, moderated the semifinal and final matches through 2008. From 2009 onward, moderators from the Round Robin have been used during the on-stage games on the final game day.

The tournament begins with an opening banquet, and concludes with a closing banquet/awards ceremony. Both banquets include speakers and entertainers. Since 2004, the opening banquet has also introduced new members into the HCASC Hall of Fame.

Tournament format

Year	Format
1990	16 team televised single-elimination playoff
1991-1993	16 team modified round robin, 8-team televised single-elimination playoff
1994-1995	8 team modified round robin, televised single-elimination playoff
1996-1998	64 team modified round robin tournament, 16-team single-elimination playoff
1999-2009	64 team modified round robin tournament, 16-team single-elimination playoff, best of 3 finals
2010-2019	48 team modified round robin tournament, 16-team single-elimination playoff, best of 3 finals
2021-2022	64 team modified round robin tournament, 16-team single-elimination playoff, best of 3 finals
2023-Present	32 team modified round robin tournament, 16-team single-elimination playoff, best of 3 finals

== Grants ==
For their efforts, schools that qualify for the NCT are awarded grants. The grant awards for the 2025-2026 season were:

- The NCT Champion school earns $100,000
- Runner-Up earns $40,000
- Semi-Finalists earn $25,000
- Quarter-Finalists earn $15,000
- Playoff Qualifiers earn $8,500
- NCT qualifiers earn $6,000
- An additional $3,500 grant is awarded to the schools of All-Star players, so designated as being the top individual scorers in each of the 8 divisions.
- The recipient of the Sportsperson of the Year Award earns their school an additional $3,500 grant
- Students can also earn additional grant money by earning a perfect score in Ultimate Challenge rounds during the playoffs.

== National Championship Tournament History ==
=== Year by Year Finalists ===
Year	Winner	Runner-up
1990	West Virginia State College	Alcorn State University
1991	Florida A&M University	West Virginia State College
1992	Norfolk State University	Langston University
1993	Tuskegee University	Morehouse College
1994	Tuskegee University (2)	Morehouse College
1995	Jackson State University	Howard University
1996	Florida A&M University (2)	South Carolina State University
1997	Alabama State University	Elizabeth City State University
1998	Florida A&M University (3)	Tuskegee University
1999	Florida A&M University (4)	Clark Atlanta University
2000	Clark Atlanta University	Southern University
2001	Morehouse College	Howard University
2002	Morehouse College (2)	Howard University
2003	Florida A&M University (5)	South Carolina State University
2004	Morehouse College (3)	University of Maryland Eastern Shore
2005	Florida A&M University (6)	Morehouse College
2006	Morehouse College (4)	North Carolina Central University
2007	Tennessee State University	Florida A&M University
2008	Oakwood University	Alcorn State University
2009	Oakwood University (2)	North Carolina Central University
2010	Prairie View A&M University	Mississippi Valley State University
2011	Florida A&M University (7)	Oakwood University
2012	Morgan State University	Oakwood University
2013	Morgan State University (2)	Florida A&M University
2014	Fisk University	Oakwood University
2015	Prairie View A&M University (2)	Cheyney University of Pennsylvania
2016	Florida A&M University (8)	Chicago State University
2017	Oakwood University (3)	Bowie State University
2018	Jackson State University (2)	Spelman College
2019	Spelman College	Florida A&M University
2020	No tournament was held due to the COVID-19 pandemic.	
2021	North Carolina A&T University	Florida A&M University
2022	Morehouse College (5)	Kentucky State University
2023	Stillman College	Tuskegee University
2024	Oakwood University (4)	Howard University
2025	Hampton University	Tennessee State University
2026	North Carolina Central University	Hampton University

Numbers in parentheses denote multiple championships

=== 1990-2009 ===
1990

In the first national championship, West Virginia State defeated Alcorn State in the finals that took place at Howard University in Washington, D.C. The Challenge received a special commendation from then President George H. W. Bush.

1991

Florida A&M University defeated defending champs West Virginia State in the finals.

1995

Jackson State University defeated Howard University in the finals that took place in Los Angeles, California. Participants received tributes from the mayors and governors in their college's home cities and states, as well as ones from Presidents Bill Clinton & Nelson Mandela.

1998

Florida A&M defeated Tuskegee University in the finals at Walt Disney World in Orlando, Florida. As winners they got to have an Oval Office meeting with President Bill Clinton.

1999

Florida A&M University won their second consecutive title defeating Clark-Atlanta University in the finals that took place in Washington D.C.

2002

Morehouse College won their second straight championship in a matchup against Howard University that took place in Orlando, FL.

=== 2010-Present ===
2014

Fisk University won their first championship, defeating Oakwood University at the American Honda Motor Company's campus in Torrance, California. Oakwood University coach R. Rennae Elliott was named Coach of the Year.

2015

Prairie View A&M University defeated Cheyney University of Pennsylvania in the finals that took place in Torrance, California. Moderator for the finals was attorney Pridgen "PJ" Green who was an HCASC alumni from Hampton University.

2016

Florida A&M University won their 8th national championship against Chicago State University. For the second year in a row the finals were both took place in Torrance, California, and moderated by Pridgen Green.

2017

Oakwood University defeated Bowie State University at the finals in Torrance, California. Bowie State's coach Robert Batten won Coach of the Year.

2019

Spelman College defeated Florida A&M University in the finals. Coach Daniel Bascelli from Spellman won Coach of the year.

2020

The 2020 national championship was cancelled due to the COVID-19 pandemic. Honda instead redirect the funds from the program to the HBCU's to support their local communities.

2021

North Carolina A&T University wins their first championship, defeating Florida A&M in the finals. The competition took place virtually due to the ongoing COVID-19 pandemic.

2022

Morehouse College wins their 5th championship, defeating Kentucky State University in the finals. For second year in a row, the competition was a virtual event. Morehouse's coach Robert Myrick was named Coach of the Year.

2023

Stillman College wins their 1st championship, defeating Tuskegee University in the finals and winning a $75,000 grant. Dr. Worth Hayes of Tuskegee was named Coach of the Year. The event was once again held at the Honda Campus in Torrance, California.

2024

Oakwood University wins their 4th championship, defeating Howard University and winning a $100,000 grant. Clayton Mack of North Carolina Central University won Coach of the Year.

2025

Hampton University wins their first championship, defeating Tennessee State University and winning a $100,000 grant. This year, students from the top two schools also won individual grants from Honda and the Thurgood Marshall College Fund.

2026

North Carolina Central University wins their 1st championship, defeating Hampton University and winning a $100,000 grant. Dr. John Miglietta of Tennessee State University won Coach of the Year.

== See also ==
- Honda Battle of the Bands
