= Robert Earle =

American game show host and voice actor (1926–2019)

- Earle hosting the College Bowl, c. 1960s
- Born: January 5, 1926; Baldwin, New York, U.S.
- Died: June 5, 2019 (aged 93); Ithaca, New York, U.S.
- Occupations: Game show host, voice actor
- Years active: 1950s–1975, 1984
- Spouse: Marion Hanna (m. 1948)
- Children: 4

Robert Earle (January 5, 1926 – June 5, 2019) was an American game show host, who was a host of G.E. College Bowl, an American game show that was broadcast first by CBS, later by NBC. Earle was the second host of the show, succeeding Allen Ludden, who left the show in 1962 to host Password. Earle hosted College Bowl during the first NBC run, from 1962 to 1970.

== Career ==
In the early 1950s, Earle was an announcer and news anchor for Utica, New York television station WKTV. After he left the station, he was replaced at the anchor desk by Dick Clark, another up-and-coming television personality. Earle then joined the staff of Ithaca College.

Earle was working in General Electric's public-relations office when he heard that Allen Ludden would be leaving College Bowl, and that the producers were seeking a replacement. Earle wanted the job, and his competition consisted of game-show hosts who were unfamiliar with the show's format. Earle prepared for his audition by recording the soundtrack of a College Bowl telecast, retaining the students' answers but removing Allen Ludden's questions. With the help of Ithaca College's audio-visual department, Earle had himself recorded, reading the questions and controlling the recorded answers with a foot pedal. Earle's clever demonstration tape won him the job.

Robert Earle had the same coloring and well-spoken manner as Allen Ludden. Columnist Bob Stahl wrote in TV Guide (Jan. 25, 1964), "When Earle first took over the show... a number of viewers noted his physical resemblance to Ludden. Both are fairly short, have sandy hair, wear horn-rimmed glasses, and sound almost alike." According to Ludden's wife Betty White (from her memoir Here We Go Again), the College Bowl producers deliberately emphasized the resemblance: "They took [Robert] to Allen's optometrist and ordered the same tortoiseshell frames that Allen wore at the time." The pleasant, unflappable Earle projected a calmer, more academic demeanor than Ludden had, which served the tone of the series well until 1970, when the series lapsed. (The sponsor thought it unwise to continue the series while student unrest was in the news.)

After College Bowl, Robert Earle became a familiar face and voice in television commercials. On the weekly Gadabout Gaddis program The Flying Fisherman, Earle represented the sponsor, Liberty Mutual Insurance.

Earle hosted a game show pilot for ABC in 1975 called King of the Hill. The pilot did not sell, but the premise of its endgame was adopted in 1978 as Card Sharks.

== Personal life ==
Earle served in the United States Navy. In 1951 he graduated from Utica College, then part of Syracuse University, with a bachelor's degree in English. He settled in Ithaca, New York, where he was a media lecturer at Ithaca College.

Earle married Marion Hanna in 1948 and remained married until he died of cancer on June 5, 2019, at age 93. Earle was later cremated. Marion died one year later of congestive heart failure in 2020, at age 96.
