= The Chronicle of Philanthropy =

American magazine on philanthropy

- Cover of The Chronicle of Philanthropy (January 2020)
- Type: Monthly magazine
- Owner: The Chronicle of Philanthropy Inc.
- Founder(s): Stacy Palmer, Phil Semas
- Founded: 1988
- Language: English
- Headquarters: 1255 Twenty-Third Street, N.W., Washington, D.C. 20037
- Circulation: 20,000+ (April 2019)
- ISSN: 1040-676X
- Website: www.philanthropy.com

The Chronicle of Philanthropy is a magazine and digital platform that covers the nonprofit world of philanthropy. Based in Washington, D.C., it is aimed at charity leaders, foundation executives, fund raisers, and other people involved in philanthropy. The Chronicle of Philanthropy publishes 12 print issues a year as well as weekday coverage and multiple e-newsletters, including Philanthropy Today.

The Chronicle of Philanthropy was founded in 1988 by editor Phil Semas and then managing editor Stacy Palmer. It was initially owned by The Chronicle of Higher Education Inc., which also publishes The Chronicle of Higher Education, a weekly newspaper covering colleges and universities. On May 4, 2022, The Chronicle of Philanthropy announced plans to spin off and become an independent, nonprofit organization, announcing in May nearly $6 million in funding, largely from the Hewlitt and Ford foundations. As of February 2023, with approval from the Internal Revenue Service, that transition took effect.

== Research projects ==
The Chronicle of Philanthropy is involved in research projects such as The Philanthropy 400, which annually ranks the nation's largest nonprofit groups based on the amount of money they raise, and The Philanthropy 50, which ranks the individuals who give the most money to nonprofit groups each year. According to a 2012 study by the Chronicle, the rich (those making over $100,000 a year) give a smaller share, averaging 4.2%, to charity than those poorer (between $50,000 - $75,000 a year), who give an average of 7.6%. In 2007, they evaluated the credibility of celebrity in charitable giving and found that often celebrity involvement is not as effective as the broader press attention it is given.

== Staff ==
The Chronicle of Philanthropy's chief executive is Stacy Palmer. Elbert Ventura was named the nonprofit's first editor-in-chief in July 2023.; he returned four months later to Vox. In March 2024, Andrew Simon was named the second editor-in-chief. The chair of its board of directors is Trabian Shorters, CEO of BMe.

In November 2025, the Chronicle of Philanthropy laid off one fifth of its staff , including Simon, changing the titles of its seven reporters to editors and naming no new editor-in-chief. According to its past two IRS Forms 990, revenue dropped from $16 million in 2024 to $8 million in 2025, with net income of -$2 million for the fiscal year ending March 2025. During that period, CEO Stacy Palmer's salary increased from $243,276 to $333,411 and Chief Revenue Officer Rodney Mahone's salary increased from $166,138 to $237,150.

== See also ==
- Arts & Letters Daily
- Institute for Nonprofit News (member)
