= SciTech (magazine) =

Popular science and technology website

SciTechDaily is a popular science website, containing sections on space, physics, biology, technology and chemistry. It was founded in 1998 by Vicki Hyde, originally as Sci Tech Daily Review, a companion site to Arts & Letters Daily. It became popular as a news aggregation site for science and technology content, featuring curated links with brief summaries to third-party sites such as NOVA: Science in the news; magazines such as The Discovery Channel, Scientific American, Popular Science; niche sites such as The Apothecary's Drawer, Brain.com, and the Glossary of Mathematical Mistakes; as well as international newspapers.

Since 2011, SciTechDaily has changed its format to publish articles directly on its site, rather than providing a daily digest of links. According to the publisher, its content is republished on sites such as Yahoo!News, Ars Technica, and Futurism, and many others.

== History ==
SciTech Daily Review was launched in 1998, as a companion site to Arts & Letters Daily, with the encouragement of Denis Dutton. Managing editor Hyde, a member of The Skeptics Society, worked on the website with a business partner out of Christchurch, New Zealand, during her spare time as a mother. In December 1998, an article in The New York Times characterized Sci Tech Daily Review and Arts & Letters Daily as "portholes" rather than portals, because they offered "narrower windows" to view an "expansive sea of on-line information".In 2002, SciTech Daily Review was selected as one of five final nominations in the Science Category for a Webby Award.

In April 2011, SciTech Daily recovered from a six-week hiatus, following the Christchurch earthquake in February. Later that year, the website transitioned to new management and overhauled its format and design to publish articles directly rather than providing links and digests. As of May 2022, it is estimated that SciTech has 8.7 million monthly readers, and is a top 30 science and education website by traffic worldwide.

== Reviews ==
In November 1999, a review of popular science websites in the Independent rated Sci Tech Daily as "the best science news site" at the time, with the caveat that it had a "perfunctory design"; the article described it as a links page that "culled the best science features, news stories and book reviews from dozens of science magazines, journals and newspapers."

A June 2000 review in Design News described www.scitechdaily.com as "a potpourri of links and information" with "news from around the world, a comprehensive listing of technology publications, plus a nice choice of a variety of 'techie' sites". A 2002 review in Industrial Engineer: IE found the content "riveting", covering topics such as the half-life of a teaspoon; why emotions and rational thought are similar; and why drug companies won't fund certain studies.

An in-depth review which appeared in Choice: Current Reviews for Academic Libraries in 2015 noted that "SciTechDaily appears to edit sources more heavily for readability and publishes fewer articles overall and so may be preferred by those who find ScienceDaily overwhelming".
