= The Chronicle of Higher Education =

American newspaper and website

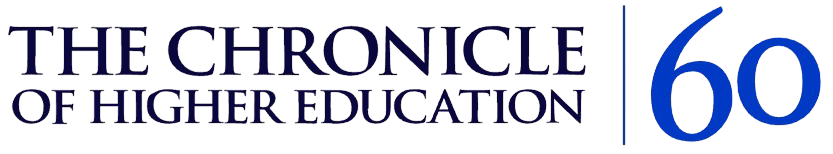

- September 18, 2009 front page of The Chronicle
- Type: Weekly newspaper, website
- Format: Tabloid
- Owner: Pamela Gwaltney (Board Chair)
- Founder: Corbin Gwaltney
- Publisher: The Chronicle of Higher Education Inc.
- Editor-in-chief: Michael G. Riley
- Staff writers: 165 employees, including 63 full-time writers and editors.
- Founded: 1966
- Language: English
- Headquarters: 1255 23rd Street, N.W., Washington, D.C., U.S.
- Circulation: 44,000 (February 2019)
- ISSN: 0009-5982 (print); 1931-1362 (web)
- OCLC number: 1554535
- Website: www.chronicle.com

The Chronicle of Higher Education is an American newspaper and website that presents news, information, and jobs for college and university faculty and student affairs professionals, including staff members and administrators. A subscription is required to read some articles.

The Chronicle is based in Washington, D.C., and is a major news service covering U.S. academia. It is published every weekday online and appears weekly in print except for every other week in May, June, July, and August and the last three weeks in December. In print, The Chronicle is published in two sections: Section A with news, section B with job listings, and The Chronicle Review, a magazine of arts and ideas. It also publishes Arts & Letters Daily.

== History ==
In 1957, Corbin Gwaltney, founder and editor of the alumni magazine at Johns Hopkins University in Baltimore, joined with editors from magazines of several other colleges and universities for an editorial project to investigate issues in higher education in perspective. The meeting occurred on the day the first Sputnik circled the Earth, October 4, 1957, so the Moonshooter project was formed as a supplement on higher education for the college magazines. The college magazine editors promised 60 percent of one issue of their magazine to finance the supplement. The first Moonshooter Report was 32 pages long and titled American Higher Education, 1958. They sold 1.35 million copies to 15 colleges and universities. By the project's third year, circulation was over three million for the supplement.

In 1959, Gwaltney left Johns Hopkins Magazine to become the first full-time employee of the newly created Editorial Projects for Education (EPE), which was later renamed "Editorial Projects in Education", starting in an office in his apartment in Baltimore and later moving to an office near the Johns Hopkins campus in Baltimore. He realized that higher education would benefit from a news publication.

He and other board members of EPE met to plan a new publication which would be called The Chronicle of Higher Education.

The Chronicle of Higher Education was officially founded in 1966 by Corbin Gwaltney, and its first issue was launched in November 1966.

Although it was meant for those involved in higher education, one of the founding ideas was that the general public had very little knowledge about what was going on in higher education and the real issues involved. Originally, it did not accept any advertising and did not have any staff-written editorial opinions. It was supported by grants from the Carnegie Corporation and the Ford Foundation. Later on in its history, advertising would be accepted, especially for jobs in higher education, and this would allow the newspaper to be financially independent.

By the 1970s, the Chronicle was attracting enough advertising to become self-sufficient, and in 1978 the board of EPE agreed to sell the newspaper to its editors. EPE sold the Chronicle to the editors for $2,000,000 in cash and $500,000 in services that Chronicle would provide to EPE. Chronicle went from a legal non-profit status to a for-profit company.

This sale shifted the focus of non-profit EPE to K-12 education. Inspired by the model established by the Chronicle, and with the support of the Carnegie Corporation and other philanthropies, EPE founded Education Week in September 1981.

In 1993, the Chronicle was one of the first newspapers to appear on the Internet, as a Gopher service.

The Chronicle grossed $33 million in advertising revenues and $7 million in circulation revenues in 2003.

== Awards ==
Over the years, the paper has been a finalist and winner of several journalism awards. In 2005, two special reports – on diploma mills and plagiarism – were selected as finalists in the reporting category for a National Magazine Award. It was a finalist for the award in general excellence every year from 2001 to 2005.

In 2005, its reporter Carlin Romano was a finalist for a Pulitzer Prize in criticism.

In 2007, The Chronicle won an Utne Reader Independent Press Award for political coverage. In its award citation, Utne called The Chronicle Review "a fearless, free-thinking section where academia's best and brightest can take their gloves off and swing with abandon at both sides of the increasingly predictable political divide." The New Republic, The Nation, Reason, and The American Prospect were among the finalists in the category.

In 2012, reporter Jack Stripling won a special citation for "beat reporting", from the Education Writers Association (EWA), as well as sharing a second-place Single-Topic News, Series or Feature award with Tom Bartlett and other Chronicle reporters for their seven-part series, "College for a Few". Brad Wolverton, earned a special citation for Investigative Reporting, "Investigating College Athletics".

In 2018, Bartlett and Nell Gluckman were named as the 2017 Runners Up in the Outstanding Higher Education Journalism category, presented by the United Kingdom's Chartered Institute of Public Relations (CIPR) Education Journalism Awards.
