= Peter Sinclair (broadcaster) =

New Zealand television personality and radio host (1938–2001)

Sinclair pictured during production of University Challenge in 1989

Peter Charles Sinclair ONZM (15 November 1938 – 8 August 2001) was an Australian-born New Zealand television personality and radio host.

== Biography ==
Born on 15 November 1938, in Sydney, Sinclair rose to fame in the 1960s and early 1970s firstly on New Zealand radio and then as host of Let's Go, Happen Inn and C'mon, New Zealand's primary pop music television shows of the time.

In 1976, he reinvented his place in New Zealand television as presenter and quizmaster on University Challenge and Mastermind, two popular television quiz shows that ran until the late 1980s. Sinclair's measured on-screen personality was suited to these kinds of interactive game shows. As a quizmaster he made the phrase "I've started, so I'll finish ..." (originally coined by Magnus Magnusson on the British version of Mastermind) a New Zealand cultural cliché. Sinclair also hosted the 1982 Mastermind International contest in New Zealand.

Sinclair was a noted writer, penning a novel called The Frontman and writing regular columns for the New Zealand Herald newspaper. He was a radio announcer from 1986 for Radio Avon in Christchurch, the city he grew up in, which became C93FM, before moving on to Easy Listening i98FM and finally Classic Hits FM, hosting the popular Lovesongs till Midnight programme. While in Christchurch he helped raise money to build a police kiosk in Cathedral Square, for people who needed a safe place to go at all times of the day in case of emergencies. In his later years, he developed a passion for computers and was one of the first New Zealanders to become actively involved with the Internet. He wrote a regular column for the New Zealand Herald on internet issues, software developments and content.

In the 2001 Queen's Birthday Honours, Sinclair was appointed an Officer of the New Zealand Order of Merit, for services to broadcasting.

Sinclair died in Auckland on 8 August 2001, from leukaemia, aged 62.

== See also ==
- List of New Zealand television personalities
