= Denis Dutton =

Professor and philosopher (1944–2010)

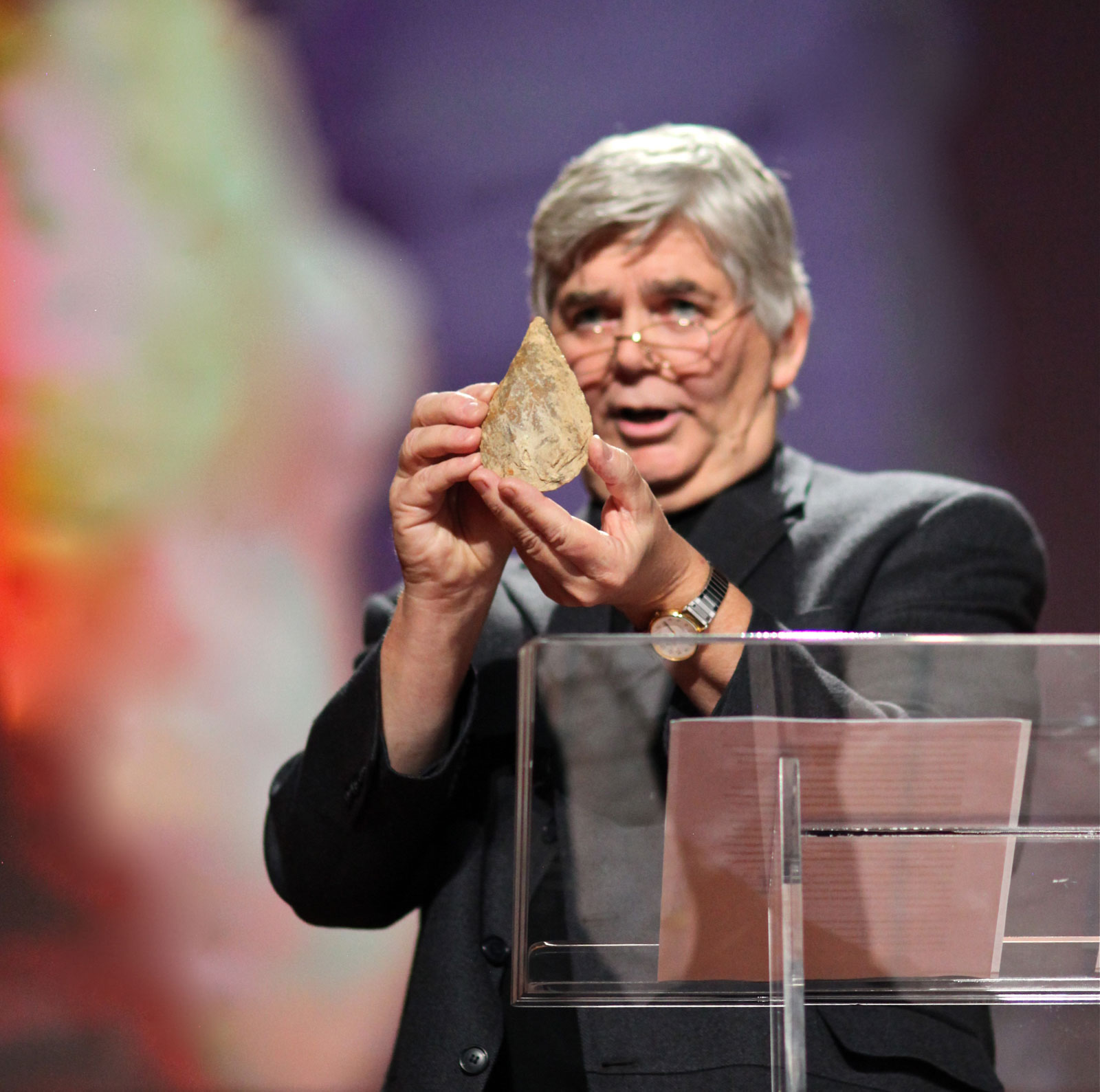
- Denis Dutton at a February 2010 TED Conference in Long Beach, California
- Born: Denis Laurence Dutton; 9 February 1944; Los Angeles, California, United States
- Died: 28 December 2010 (aged 66); Christchurch, New Zealand
- Education: University of California, Santa Barbara (B.A. 1966, PhD 1975)
- Occupations: Academic, internet entrepreneur, and media commentator
- Spouse: Margit Stoll Dutton (m. 1969)
- Children: 2
- Writing career
- Language: English
- Subjects: Art, evolution, and media
- Notable work: Arts & Letters Daily
- Website: denisdutton.com

Dr Denis Laurence Dutton (9 February 1944 – 28 December 2010) was an American-New Zealand philosopher of art, web entrepreneur, and media activist. He was a professor of philosophy at the University of Canterbury in Christchurch, New Zealand. He was also a co-founder and co-editor of the websites Arts & Letters Daily, ClimateDebateDaily.com, and cybereditions.com.

== Life and career ==
Denis Dutton was born in Los Angeles, California, United States, on 9 February 1944, as the second of four children of William and Thelma Dutton, who were booksellers and founded what became Dutton's Books, a chain of independent bookstores. He grew up in North Hollywood, graduated from North Hollywood High School, and was educated at the University of California, Santa Barbara, where he earned his bachelor's degree in philosophy in 1966 and his PhD in philosophy in 1975. Between taking these degrees, he went to India with the Peace Corps and learned to play sitar. Dutton taught at several American universities, including the University of California, Santa Barbara and the University of Michigan–Dearborn, before emigrating to New Zealand.

Dutton started teaching at the University of Canterbury, Christchurch, in 1984. From 2008 to 2010, he was the Head of the Philosophy school in an unofficial capacity and acted briefly as Head of Humanities. At its December 2010 graduation ceremony, the University of Canterbury awarded Dutton a research medal for his work.

He was a member of the editorial board for The Rutherford Journal.

On 28 December 2010, Dutton died from cancer.

== Arts & Letters Daily ==
Dutton was best known for the web aggregation site Arts & Letters Daily, which he founded in 1998 and which secured him a place among "the most influential media personalities in the world". The site, described as "the first and foremost aggregator of well-written and well-argued book reviews, essays, and other articles in the realm of ideas", features links to articles across the web about literature, art, science, and politics, for which Dutton wrote pithy teasers. In recognition of Arts & Letters Daily, Steven Pinker called Dutton a visionary for recognizing that a website "could be a forum for cutting-edge ideas, not just a way to sell things or entertain the bored".

== Cybereditions ==
Dutton served as executive director of Cybereditions, a print on demand publishing company he founded in 2000 which specializes in new and out-of-print copyright works, mostly of a scholarly nature. The editorial board of the company has included other academics such as Frederick Crews, Anthony Grafton and Marjorie Perloff.

== Aesthetics ==
Dutton wrote on authenticity in art and distinguished between nominal authenticity, in which a work of art is correctly attributed to its author rather than being a forgery, and expressive authenticity, where a work is a true expression of an individual's or a society's values and beliefs.

In his book The Art Instinct (2010) Dutton opposes the view that art appreciation is culturally learned, claiming instead that art appreciation stems from evolutionary adaptions made during the Pleistocene. He set out abbreviated versions of his theory in a 2009 Google Talk lecture and a 2010 TED talk.

Dutton also argued that progress in the arts and sciences had declined, especially since around 1800.

== Criticism of academic prose ==
As editor of the journal Philosophy and Literature, Dutton ran the Bad Writing Contest, which aimed to "expose 'pretentious, swaggering gibberish' passed off as scholarship at leading universities". In 1995, the contest was won by Homi K. Bhabha and Fredric Jameson. In 1998, the contest awarded first place to philosopher and University of California-Berkeley Professor Judith Butler, for a sentence which appeared in the journal diacritics. Butler defended their work against the charges of academic pedantry and obscurantism in the pages of The New York Times. Dutton then ended the contest.

The Bad Writing Contest emerged in an intellectual climate dominated by the fallout from the Sokal affair, in which the alleged opaqueness and obscurity of postmodern writing came in for criticism: Edward Said, for instance, deplored "diminishment and incoherence" in the writings of some of his colleagues and Martha Nussbaum condemned academic writing that was "ponderous and obscure".

== Politics and activism ==
Dutton supported "conservative ideas" and was a member of the Libertarian Party for some years.

Dutton was one of the founding members and first chair of the NZ Skeptics. In 2009, he stated that he believed that "climate change is still an open question".

He was also a passionate supporter of public radio. In the early 1990s, he founded the lobby group The New Zealand Friends of Public Broadcasting in response to proposals to devolve New Zealand's two non-commercial public radio stations.

In 1995 he was appointed to the board of directors of Radio New Zealand, where he served for seven years. After concluding his term as a director, Dr. Dutton and Dr. John Isles issued a report criticising Radio New Zealand for loss of neutrality in news and current affairs, failure to adhere to charter and opposed to contestable funding of broadcasting.

== Bibliography ==
Dutton's publications include:

- Denis Laurence Dutton (1974). Art and anthropology: aspects of criticism and the social studies. University of California, Santa Barbara.
- Denis Dutton (1983). The Forger's art: forgery and the philosophy of art. University of California Press. ISBN 0-520-04341-3.
- Denis Dutton; Michael Krausz (1985). The Concept of creativity in science and art. M. Nijhoff. ISBN 90-247-3127-5.
- Denis Dutton (2003). Jerrold Levinson (ed.). "Authenticity in Art". The Oxford Handbook of Aesthetics. Oxford University Press. Archived from the original on 7 January 2011.
- Charles A. Murray; Denis Dutton; Claire Fox (2008). In Praise of Elitism. Centre for Independent Studies, The. ISBN 978-1-86432-166-1.
- Denis Dutton (2009). The art instinct: beauty, pleasure, & human evolution. Oxford University Press US. ISBN 978-0-19-953942-0.
- Michael Krausz; Denis Dutton; Karen Bardsley (2009). The idea of creativity. Brill. ISBN 978-90-04-17444-3.
