= Homeopathic hospitals in the National Health Service =

The UK National Health Service has historically supported a number of hospitals which were created to primarily offer homeopathic treatments. Following declining support within the NHS for homeopathy as a treatment, all but one have now either closed down or substantially modified their activities.

The parliamentary Science and Technology Select Committee recommended in 2010 that prescription of homeopathy treatment on the NHS should cease.

In 2016 it was estimated that NHS expenditure on homeopathy amounted to about £5 million. There have been repeated campaigns to remove homeopathy from the list of treatments paid for by the NHS.

Following guidance from NHS England management that NHS spending on homeopathic treatments should cease, and that GPs should be advised to "de-prescribe" the treatments for existing patients, the British Homeopathic Association brought a lawsuit against the NHS. In 2018, the High Court ruled in favour of NHS England.

As of 2018, the NHS Centre for Integrative Care was the only remaining NHS hospital offering homeopathic treatment, with an annual budget of £1.7m.

== List of hospitals ==
NHS homeopathic hospitals included:

- The Royal London Homeopathic Hospital, founded in 1849. Renamed the Royal London Hospital for Integrated Medicine in 2010. Ceased offering homeopathy in 2018.
- Bristol Homeopathic Hospital, founded as a dispensary in 1832 and became a hospital in 1852; closed in 2015
- NHS Centre for Integrative Care, on the Gartnavel Hospital campus, still operating in 2018
- Liverpool Homeopathic Hospital, originally known as the Liverpool Hahnemann Hospital and Dispensaries, founded in 1887 and closed in 1976
- Tunbridge Wells Homeopathic Hospital, founded in 1902 and closed in 2009

== See also ==
- Regulation and prevalence of homeopathy#United Kingdom
