= Queenie Muriel Francis Adams =

British academic, physician, and missionary

Queenie Muriel Francis Adams, MRCS, LRCP, MFHom, (7 May 1902 – 19 August 1999), also known as Queenie Muriel Frances Adams, was a British academic, physician, and missionary. After her education, Adams worked in the medical field both at home in London and abroad in Egypt. In addition to her medical work, Adams was a noted lecturer at Medical Service Ministries, then known as the Missionary School of Medicine, and All Nations Bible College. A strong proponent of homeopathy and the autonomous nervous system, Adams dedicated a portion of her work to raising awareness and advocating for these fields.

Adams left behind a significant legacy through her teaching, medical work, founding of various organizations, and publication of Neither Male nor Female: A Study of the Scriptures, an analysis of women in the Bible. Her legacy of organizations included a Christian school in Cornwall, a charitable trust for Christian rehabilitation of patients with mental health issues, and a nursing home in Reading, England.

== Early life ==
Queenie Muriel Francis Adams was born on 7 May 1902 at Rose Cottage Stanmore in Hastings, Sussex, which is located on the south coast of England, and grew up in Little Stanmore, Middlesex. She was born to William Grylls Adams, who worked as a consulting engineer and patent agent, and Annie Louisa Kate Brothers. She had two older sisters, Winifred and Alice, and two younger siblings, John and Dorothy.

== Education ==
In 1928, Adams enrolled in Redcliffe Missionary Training College, the first school to provide formal missionary training for women in England. As Adams was a devout Christian, the college's curriculum, which focused on specifically training students for Christian mission work, aligned well with her spiritual beliefs. About a decade later, Adams enrolled in the Missionary School of Medicine, where she took a one-year course on serving as a medical missionary worker. In contrast to her time at Redcliffe, Adams' education at MSM represented an informal course as she never took a public exam or received a certification that licensed her to work with programs sponsored by organizations other than MSM. Finally, in 1946, Adams was awarded a license to practise medicine by the Royal College of Physicians of London as one of thirty-two women who had passed the final examination in medicine, surgery, and midwifery.

== Missionary work ==
=== Work with Children's Special Service Mission ===
At the age of 18, Queenie Adams joined the ranks of the Children's Special Service Mission, a Christian organization intended to bring children to the faith via the recommendations of their peers. Adams was engaged in CSSM's beach mission, in which volunteers go to popular vacation sites in efforts both to invite newcomers to the organization and to reinforce the spirituality of existing members.

=== Work in Egypt ===
Adams had a series of experiences as a religious, educational, and medical missionary in Egypt that were dispersed throughout her life. First, in 1931, she worked with the Church Mission to the Jews, now known as the Church's Ministry Among Jewish People, which sought to spread Christianity amongst the Jewish population. Later she taught at a mission college in Cairo named As-Salam College, also known as English Mission College. After her time at the Missionary School of Medicine in London, Adams returned to Egypt and worked for the Egyptian government during the cholera outbreak of 1948. While in Egypt, Adams had an experience with homeopathic treatment that resolved a fellow missionary's abscess; as a result she vowed to bring homeopathic treatment to London through teaching and publication.

== Work in England ==
=== Public medicine ===
In 1937, Adams applied to be a physician at the Royal Free Hospital in Hampstead, London. As it was a teaching hospital, it required tuition which Adams did not have the means to pay. Fortunately, she received two scholarships, which in an interview she attributed to the grace of God. A hospital meant to provide free care to those without the financial means to go elsewhere, the Royal Free Hospital and its ideals tapped into Adams' altruistic spirit, ultimately inspiring some of her later work. Thirteen years later, she qualified to work at the Royal London Homeopathic Hospital, where she lectured on the topic of nervous diseases in addition to working as a physician.

=== Private medicine ===
Towards the middle of the 20th century, Adams started her own homeopathic practice in North London, in the sitting room of a local minister. She charged a fee of one shilling, but eventually decided to stop the practice as she thought it would be "frowned upon" by the Royal Free Hospital. During her work at the Royal London Homeopathic Hospital, Adams received a copy of Materia Medica, which inspired her to once again create a private homeopathic practice. The practice originated in Harley Street, but was so successful that it expanded to Reading, Hastings, Wimborne, and Bournemouth. In the same spirit as the Royal Free Hospital, Adams reduced her fees to provide treatment to those who otherwise would not have been able to afford it. In 1965, Adams moved herself and her practice to Cornwall, where she came highly recommended and was described by a fellow doctor as "brilliant, unconventional, and limitlessly kind." Adams' last position as a physician was at PYE Barn Limited in Cornwall, where she worked from 17 January 1992 until her resignation on 7 February 1996, a little more than a year before her death.

=== Teaching ===
Adams returned to the Missionary School of Medicine, one of her alma maters, in the 1950s to serve as a teacher in general medicine with an emphasis on her overseas work in Egypt. Later she also taught Tropical Medicine at All Nations Bible College.
