= Regulation and prevalence of homeopathy =

Alternative medicine

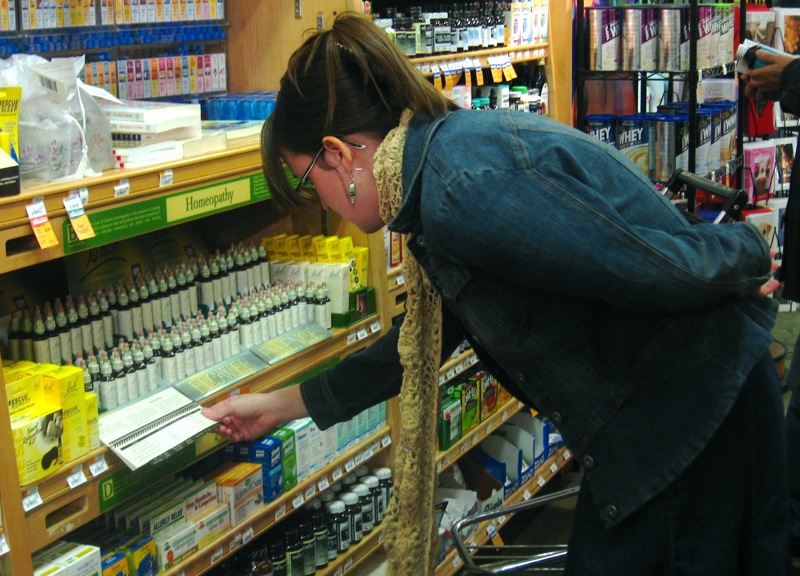
Woman looking at homeopathic remedies

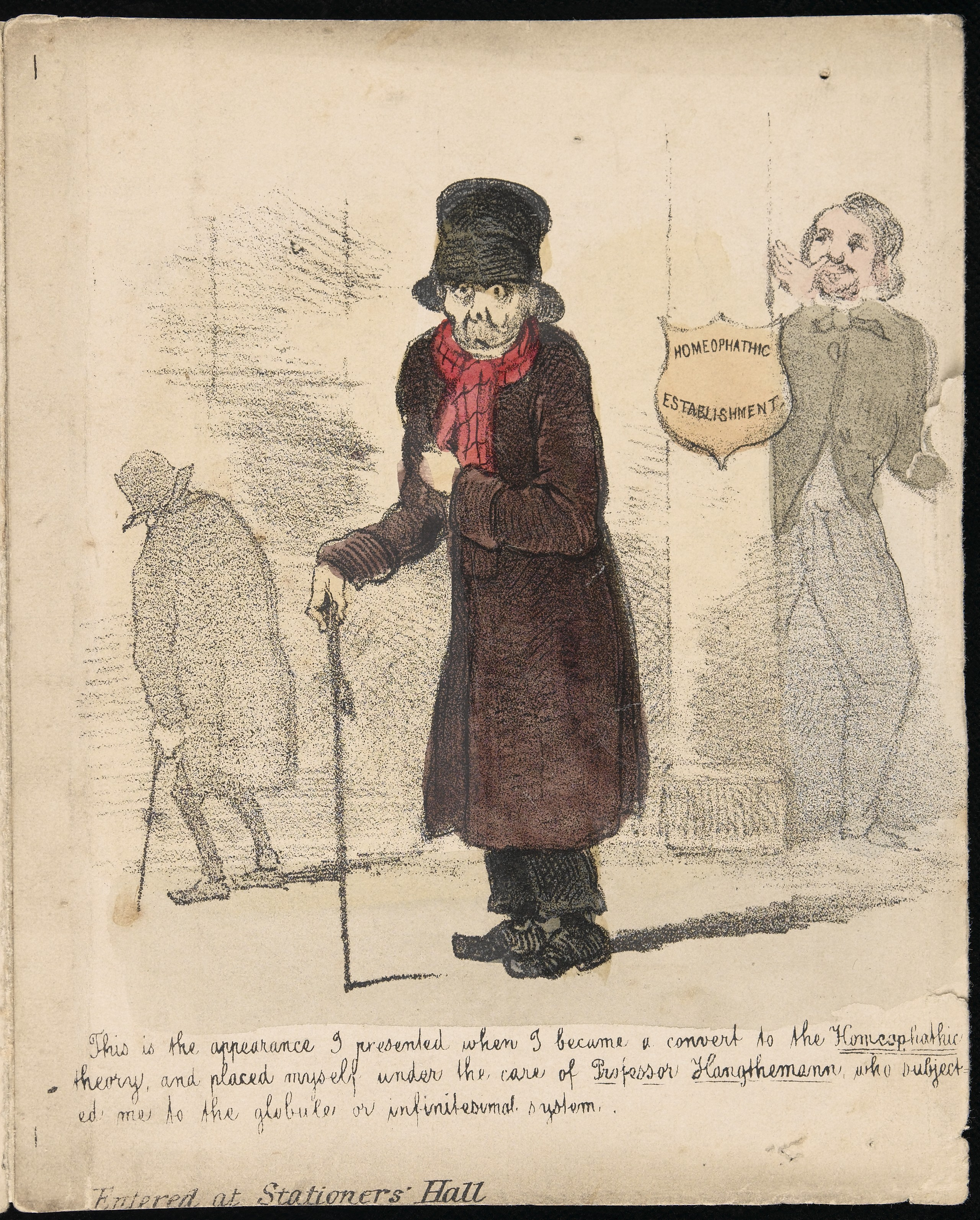
A patient suffering from the effects of homeopathic treatment (Wellcome Trust)

Homeopathy is fairly common in some countries while being uncommon in others. In some countries, there are no specific legal regulations concerning the use of homeopathy, while in others, licenses or degrees in conventional medicine from accredited universities are required.

Homeopathic preparations are not effective for treating any condition. Scientists and evidence based medical practitioners consider homeopathy a sham or a pseudoscience, and the mainstream medical community regards it as quackery.

== Europe ==
Regulations vary in Europe depending on the country. In Austria and Germany, no specific regulations exist, while France and Denmark mandate licenses to diagnose any illness or dispense of any product whose purpose is to treat any illness. Some homeopathic treatment is covered by the national insurance of several European countries, including Denmark, some parts of the United Kingdom, and Luxembourg. In other countries, such as Belgium, France, and the Czech Republic, homeopathy is not covered. In 2004, Germany, which formerly offered homeopathy under its public health insurance scheme withdrew this privilege, with a few exceptions. In June 2005, the Swiss Government, after a five-year trial, withdrew insurance coverage for homeopathy and four other alternative treatments, stating that they did not meet efficacy and cost-effectiveness criteria. However, following the result of a referendum in 2009 the five therapies were reinstated for a further six-year trial period from 2012.

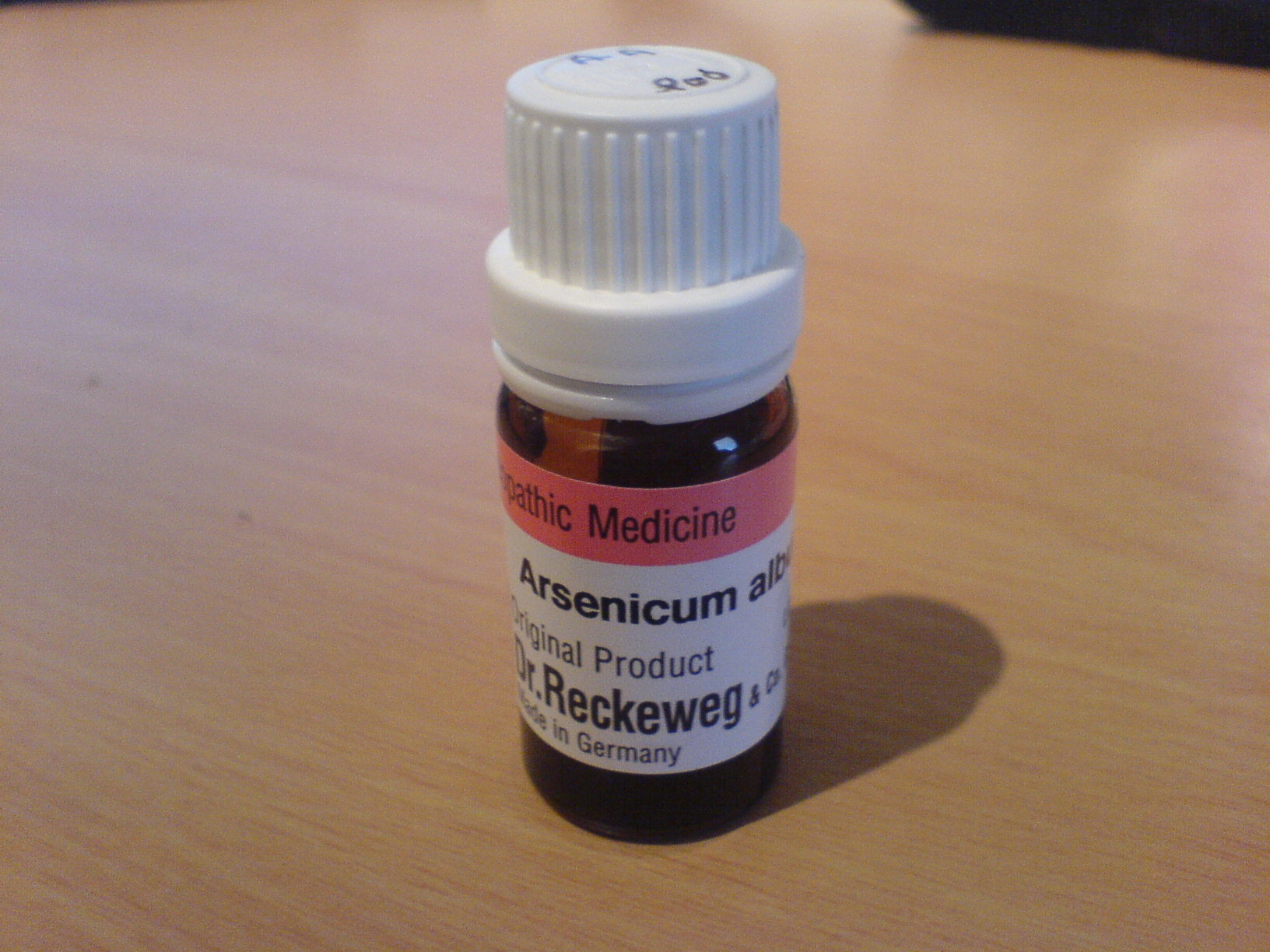
The homeopathic remedy arsenicum album, derived from arsenic

=== European Union ===
In 1992, the Council of the European Communities stated in the preamble to its directive that homeopathy was officially recognized in certain member states but only tolerated in others. In any case it was prescribed and used in all member states. To harmonize the market of homeopathic products, the council, by Directive 92/73/EEC directed the member states to implement certain changes in their national legislation. Directive 92/73/EEC was replaced by Directive 2001/83/EC on the Community code relating to medicinal products for human use.

Member states are required to ensure that homeopathic products (for oral or external use) can be registered without proof of therapeutic efficacy, provided that there is a sufficient degree of dilution to guarantee the safety of the product; in particular, the product may not contain either more than one part per 10,000 of the mother tincture or more than 1/100 of the smallest dose used in mainstream medicine, with regard to active principles whose presence in a medicinal product results in the obligation to submit a doctor's prescription. In other words, the dilution must be at least D4/4X/C2, and even higher in special cases. Other homeopathic products can still be registered under the normal rules, and products such as Arnica D1 are legally available.

The labels of homeopathic products registered without proof of efficacy must include the words "homeopathic medicinal product without approved therapeutic indications" as well as "a warning advising the user to consult a doctor if the symptoms persist during the use of the medicinal product".

==== Belgium ====
As of 12 May 2014, the exercise of homeopathy in Belgium is reserved by law to only doctors, dentists and midwives, and should only be used for those indications for which the exercise is shown to be effective according to evidence-based medicine. The Belgian Council of Ministers agreed on 12 July 2013, with the draft royal decree as proposed by the Minister of Social Affairs and Public Health Laurette Onkelinx. The law follows the recommendations of the Belgian Health Care Knowledge Centre, who concluded on the basis of a systematic review of the scientific literature that there is no evidence that homeopathic treatments work better than a placebo. It advised against reimbursement by the compulsory health insurance and advised that only doctors should be allowed to practice homeopathy.

==== France ====
Homeopathy is the most popular form of alternative medicine in France. Its use rose from 16% of the population in 1982 to 29% in 1987 and 36% in 1992. In a 2018 survey, 77% of French answered to have used homeopathic remedies at least once, 58% have used them "several times", and more than 40% have used homeopathy for over 10 years. Nevertheless, in July 2019 the French ministry of health declared homeopathic medicines would no longer be reimbursed starting in 2021 as they are deemed to "not provide sufficient public health benefits".

==== Germany ====
In Germany, the legislation for homeopathic remedies follows European Union (EU) regulations. Homeopathic remedies are subject to registration, but they need not be tested. However, homeopathic remedies that are less diluted than D4, or for which a danger of adverse effects exists, cannot be registered under this rule. They can be sold over-the-counter in pharmacies. Germany is the only member state of the EU in which homeopathic remedies based on minerals or plants, and produced only in very low quantities, do not need to be registered. In other member states only remedies individually prepared in a pharmacy are exempt.

In 2017, homeopathic remedies accounted for 2.74% of sold units in the pharmaceutical sector (0.90% of business volume); 0.14% of prescriptions covered by public health insurance were for homeopathic remedies. A 2008 telephone survey of German adults found that 11.5% had used homeopathy. Homeopathy accounts for 27.4% of patient contacts in the area of alternative medicine.

==== Italy ====
A survey of more than 70,000 citizens showed that approximately 4.7 million people in Italy (8.2% of the population) used homeopathy from 1997 to 1999, including being given to 7.7% children under 14 years. Homeopathy use rose from 2.5% in 1991 to 8.2% in 1999, but, despite the increase these numbers are still considered to represent comparatively light use compared to other countries.

==== Netherlands ====
In 1991, 40% of general practitioners used homeopathy.

==== Romania ====
Romania follows the general practices of EU regarding homeopathy. It is regulated by the National Agency of Drugs and Medical Devices (ANMDM) and is not permitted without a license. Most homeopathic drugs are sold over the counter. Approval of homeopathic drugs was simplified, considering there is no need for excessive testing for most of them.

==== Spain ====
In 2018, the Collegiate Medical Organization of Spain published a report in which it rejected homeopathy and other non-scientific medical practices; this report changed the organization's previous position, dating from 2009, when it had approved the recognition of homeopathy as a "medical procedure". The change was prompted by the activity of the Association to Protect the Sick from Pseudoscientific Therapies, which, among other actions, has produced a European manifesto for the change of laws that protect the sale of homeopathy in Europe.

In 2020, a judge from Spain dismissed a lawsuit for slander that a group of homeopaths had filed against two critics of homeopathy (Fernando Cervera and Aurelio Duque). The sentence, which cited the Royal National Academy of Pharmacy, stated "no solo no funcionaba, sino que la homeopatía puede poner en riesgo la salud" ("it is not only ineffective, homeopathy can put [a person's] health at risk"). It was the first time that a Spanish court ruled against homeopathy.

In 2026, the Spanish ministry of Health ruled that homepathy was a "placebo" and that it could pose "a risk to health", without any evidence supporting its effects.

==== Sweden ====
In September 2011, after the National Board of Health and Welfare put a doctor on probation for recommending homeopathy to a patient, Sweden's Supreme Administrative Court ruled that "doctors can recommend homeopathy". In October 2013 a legal review conducted by the National Board of Health and Welfare on behalf of the government concluded that the use of homeopathy by licensed medical professionals is limited to patient-initiated last-resort treatments.

=== Switzerland ===
State insurance funding of homeopathy and four other alternative therapies had been withdrawn after a review in 2005, and a 2009 referendum vote called for state backed health insurance to once more pay for these therapies. In 2012 the government reinstated them for a trial period until 2017, pending an independent investigation of the efficacy and cost-effectiveness of the therapies.

The rules for the registration of homeopathic remedies without a concrete field of application are more liberal in Switzerland than they are in member countries of the EU. For homeopathic medicines based on well-known low-risk substances, Swissmedic, the regulatory authority, offers inexpensive registration by means of a simplified electronic registration procedure.

=== United Kingdom ===
While the practice of homeopathy in the United Kingdom (UK) is not regulated by law, homeopathic products sold as remedies or medicines are regulated by the Medicines and Healthcare products Regulatory Agency.

In the United Kingdom, homeopathy in the public health sector has steadily declined over recent years. The number of National Health Service (NHS) prescriptions for homeopathic remedies dropped by over 85% between 2000 and 2010 (from 134,000 to 16,359), with homeopathy accounting for only 0.001% of the total 2010 prescribing budget. The Tunbridge Wells Homeopathic Hospital, formerly one of four homeopathic hospitals operated by the NHS, was closed in 2009 following a drop in referrals and a review by the West Kent Primary Care Trust of funding of homeopathy. In September 2010, one of the three remaining NHS-funded homeopathic hospitals, the Royal London Homeopathic Hospital, was renamed as the Royal London Hospital for Integrated Medicine to more accurately reflect the nature of its work. A fifth homeopathic hospital run by the NHS, the Hahnemann Hospital in Liverpool, had been closed in 1976.

In 1991 up to 37% of general practitioners (GPs) used homeopathy, but a review carried out by West Kent NHS Primary Care Trust in 2007 found that less than 1% of registered patients were referred for homeopathic treatment, and that this was almost always at the patient's request rather than as the result of a clinical decision. In 2011 the British Homeopathic Association said that 400 GPs used homeopathy in their everyday practice. The British Homeopathic Dental Association (BHDA) claimed to have 69 dentists, while the British Association of Homeopathic Veterinary Surgeons had 36 vets listed as members. There are over 41,000 GPs and around 24,000 registered veterinary surgeons in the UK, and almost 23,000 dentists doing NHS work in England.

In 2009 there were approximately 2,000 homeopaths, who are not GPs, registered with various organisations. A systematic review of surveys, published in April 2013, concluded that homeopathy is used by UK medical professionals to a minor degree, and that on average referral rates are low.

Around 2009, UK universities began to close or review their courses on homeopathy and alternative medicine, after accusations that they were teaching pseudoscience. These courses had been attracting bad publicity and criticism for the universities teaching them. In May 2010, the NHS announced that junior doctors' training would no longer include placements at the Glasgow Homeopathic Hospital. In March 2021 the last UK university validating a degree in homeopathy announced that it was ceasing to do so.

In February 2010, the Science and Technology Select Committee concluded that: "the NHS should cease funding homeopathy. It also concludes that the Medicines and Healthcare products Regulatory Agency (MHRA) should not allow homeopathic product labels to make medical claims without evidence of efficacy. As they are not medicines, homeopathic products should no longer be licensed by the MHRA." Part of the conclusions state that "When the NHS funds homeopathy, it endorses it. Since the NHS Constitution explicitly gives people the right to expect that decisions on the funding of drugs and treatments are made 'following a proper consideration of the evidence', patients may reasonably form the [misleading] view [inferred from the fact of any NHS financial support] that homeopathy is an evidence-based treatment." Since no evidence of benefit was found – other than the placebo effect – the report's recommendation was that "The Government should stop allowing the funding of homeopathy on the NHS." The government stated that this decision would be left open to the primary care trusts (PCTs), the smaller bodies in charge of regional NHS management, instead of being done by the government itself.

In June 2010, the British Medical Association voted three to one in favour of a motion that homeopathy should be banned from the NHS, and kept from being sold as medicine in pharmacies. In February 2011, out of 104 PCTs who responded to queries, 72 said they did not fund homeopathy, with 10 of these having stopped funding homeopathy in the last four years. By the 2011-2012 financial year, the percentage of PCTs funding homeopathy had fallen to 15%.

In July 2013, the Advertising Standards Authority concluded that homeopathy sellers were engaging in false advertising regarding their claims of efficacy of homeopathic products and that at the same time they discouraged users from seeking essential treatments for conditions for which they were needed.

In 2016, it was estimated that NHS expenditure on homeopathy still amounted to about £5 million, in spite of repeated campaigns to remove homeopathy from the list of treatments paid for by the NHS. In July 2017, the NHS announced a policy of not funding homeopathic medicine because it is "a misuse of resources"; they also called on the UK Department of Health to add homeopathic remedies to the blacklist of forbidden prescription items, and the NHS ceased funding homeopathic remedies in November 2017. Following guidance from NHS England management that NHS spending on homeopathic treatments should cease, and that GPs should be advised to "de-prescribe" the treatments for existing patients, the British Homeopathic Association brought a lawsuit against the NHS. In 2018, the High Court ruled in favour of NHS England.

== Australia ==
A review of the existing evidence by the National Health and Medical Research Council, Australia's principal agency for medical and public health research, concluded that homeopathy is not an effective treatment for any medical condition. To prevent bias, the studies were also reviewed and appraised by an independent company.

According to one 1996 study, approximately 4.4% of Australian adults have used homeopathic remedies at least once in their lives, including 1.2% that sought treatment exclusively from homeopathic practitioners.

== North America ==
=== Canada ===
In Canada, a 1994 study detailing the use of alternative medicines by children in Quebec found that 11% of the sampled 1,911 children used alternative medicines, and 25% of those who did use alternative medicines (less than 3% of all children sampled) used homeopathy. The study also pointed out that homeopathy is more commonly used in children in Canada than in adults, of whom only 19% of alternative medicine users used homeopathy. Physicians who choose to use alternative medicines such as homeopathy must follow guidelines set by their province's College of Physicians and Surgeons. Provincial health care generally does not cover homeopathy.

=== United States ===
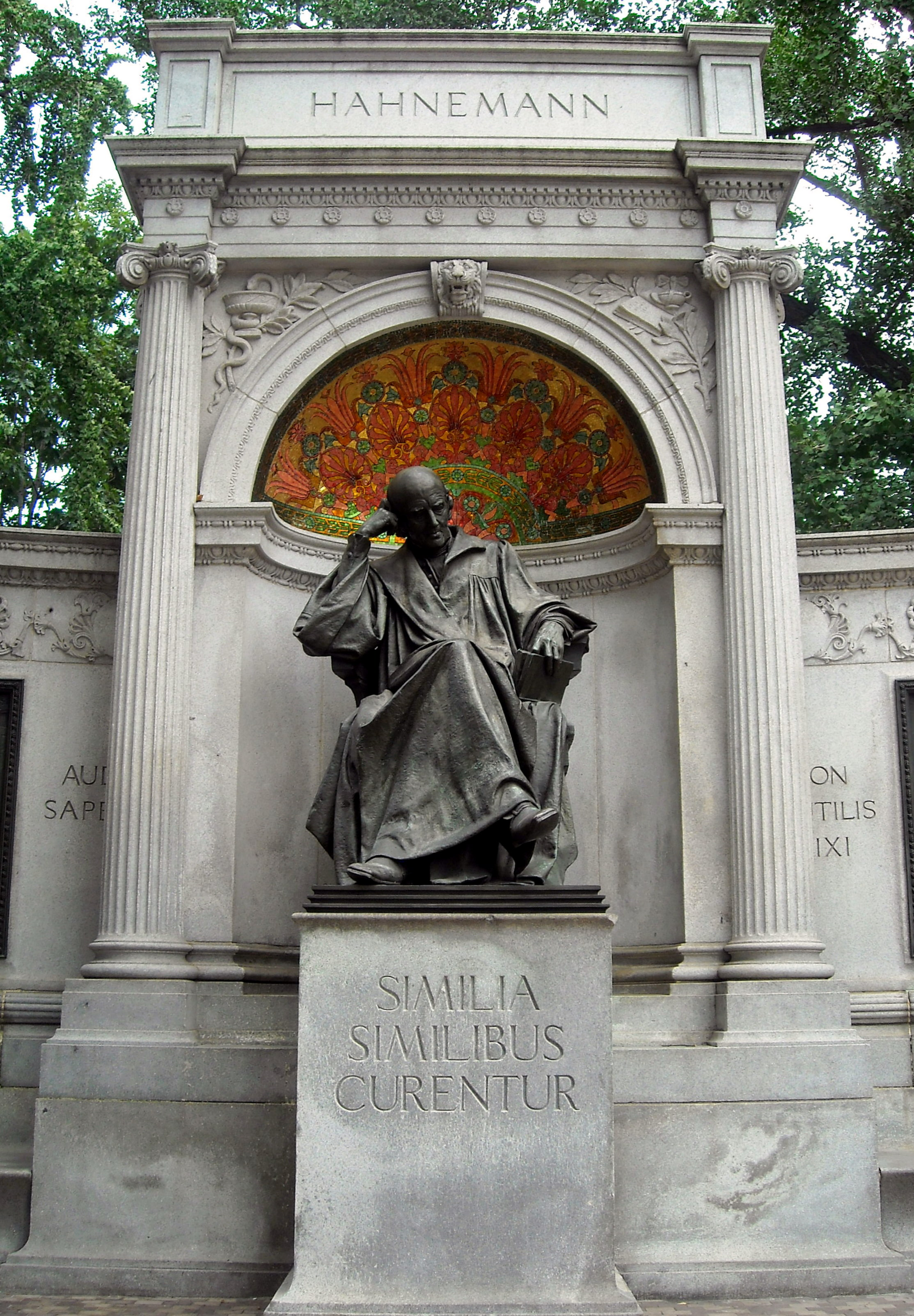
Samuel Hahnemann Monument, Washington, D.C., with "Similia Similibus Curentur" - Like cures Like

The Federal Food, Drug, and Cosmetic Act (FD&C Act) of 1938 recognized homeopathic preparations as drugs, but with significant exceptions. A principal sponsor of the Act was New York Senator and homeopathic physician Royal Copeland, who ensured that homeopathy's own Homœopathic Pharmacopœia of the United States (HPUS) be included, as it expressed the "self-professed quality standards" of the homeopathic profession. The finished Act thus created loopholes for the regulation of homeopathic drugs, and they are thus exempted from many of the rules regulating other drugs. The inclusion of HPUS in the Act has since been questioned by "lawyers, doctors, homeopaths, historians, and Food and Drug Administration (FDA) officials."

Homeopathic remedies are regulated by the Food and Drug Administration (FDA), which regulates manufacturing and other standards that are appropriate for homeopathic drugs, mainly through The Homœopathic Pharmacopœia of the United States (HPUS) as administered by the Homœopathic Pharmacopœia Convention of the United States and section 400.400 of the FDA Compliance Policy Guidance Manual. Homeopathic drugs must be tested for scope of effect, and manufactured and labeled according to the Federal FD&C Act and the HPUS before they are considered official homeopathic drugs. The last bound paper edition of HPUS was published in 1979. It has been replaced by an online database available to subscribers. Official homeopathic drugs can be marketed according to their classification in the HPUS. They are not regulated under the Dietary Supplement Health and Education Act of 1994. Many homeopathic drugs can be sold "over-the-counter"; however, some are classified as prescription-only under all circumstances, and some are classified as prescription-only in various low dilutions. As with all drugs, the labeling requirements are important, as that is one of the primary ways the FDA can regulate drugs. Homeopathic pharmaceutical techniques are not technologically complicated, and the drugs are generally considered to be biologically safe because they are so diluted to the point where there are no molecules from the original solution left in a dose of the final remedy.

The FDA makes significant exemptions for homeopathic remedies as compared to other drugs. Here are a few:

1. They are not required to submit new drug applications to the FDA.
2. They are "exempt from good manufacturing practice requirements related to expiration dating".
3. They are exempt from "finished product testing for identity and strength".
4. They may "contain much higher amounts" of alcohol than other drugs, which may contain "no more than 10 percent ... and ... even less for children's medications".

By 2007, in the United States, $3.1 billion were spent on homeopathic medicine and 2.3% of the persons age 18 or over had consulted a practitioner that year. Homeopathy was first established in the United States by Hans Birch Gram in 1825 and rapidly gained popularity. The height of its influence was the end of the 19th century where hardly any city with over 50,000 people was without a homeopathic hospital. In 1890, there were 93 regular schools, 14 of them were fully homeopathic and 8 of them were eclectic. In 1900, there were 121 regular schools, with 22 of them being homeopathic and 10 eclectic. Teaching of homeopathy in the United States declined rapidly in the 20th century. The last purely homeopathic medical school closed in 1920, although homeopathic electives continued to be offered by the Hahnemann Medical School in Philadelphia until the 1940s.

According to one study, in 1990, 0.7% of individuals used homeopathy in the year prior to being questioned; in 1997, 3.4% had used homeopathy at least once in the previous year. According to the same study, of those who used homeopathy, 31.7% had seen a homeopathic practitioner in the past year in 1990 and the number dropped to 16.5% by 1997.

The FDA held a hearing April 20 and 21, 2015, requesting public comment on regulation of homeopathic drugs. Citing the growth of sales of over-the-counter homeopathic medicines, $2.7 billion as of 2007, many labeled as "natural, safe, and effective", the FDA asked:

1. What are consumer and health care provider attitudes towards human drug and biological products labeled as homeopathic?
2. What data sources can be identified or shared with FDA so that the Agency can better assess the risks and benefits of drug and biological products labeled as homeopathic?
3. Are the current enforcement policies under the CPG appropriate to protect and promote public health in light of the tremendous growth in the homeopathic drug market? Are there alternatives to the current enforcement policies of the CPG that would inform FDA's regulatory oversight of drugs labeled as homeopathic? If so, please explain.
4. Are there areas of the current CPG that could benefit from additional clarity? If so, please explain.
5. Is there information regarding the regulation of homeopathic products in other countries that could inform FDA's thinking in this area?
6. A large majority of human drug products labeled as homeopathic are marketed as OTC drugs.These products are available for a wide variety of indications, and many of these indications have never been considered for OTC use under a formal regulatory process. What would be an appropriate regulatory process for evaluating such indications for OTC use?
7. Given the wide range of indications on drug products labeled as homeopathic and available OTC, what processes do companies currently use to evaluate whether such products, including their indications for use, are appropriate for marketing as an OTC drug?
8. Do consumers and health care providers have adequate information to make informed decisions about drug products labeled as homeopathic? If not, what information, including, for example, information in labeling, would allow consumers and health care providers to be better informed about products labeled as homeopathic?

On 15 November 2016, FTC declared that homeopathic products cannot include claims of effectiveness without "competent and reliable scientific evidence." If no such evidence exists, they must state this fact clearly on their labeling, and state that the product's claims are based only on 18th-century theories that have been discarded by modern science. The agency said failure to do so would be considered a violation of the FTC Act, a separate authorizing law from the FDA's. (The Wheeler–Lea Act of 1938 established FTC authority to regulate advertising claims of non-prescription drugs.)

=== Mexico ===
In Mexico, homeopathy is currently integrated into the national healthcare system. In 1895, a presidential decree by Gral. Porfirio Díaz established the first homeopathic school and hospital as well as regulations specifying training requirements for homeopathic doctors. Of those individuals who use alternative medicines, over 26% use homeopathy.

== South America ==
Some countries in South America, such as Argentina or Colombia, allow only professional doctors who are qualified and have graduated from a recognised medical school to practice homeopathy. Homeopathy has been regulated in other South American countries, such as Colombia, since the beginning of the 20th century. In Brazil, homeopathy is included in the national health system, and since 1991, physicians who want to practice homeopathy must complete 2,300 hours of education prior to receiving the proper licenses.

== Middle East and Asia ==
India has the largest homeopathic infrastructure in the world, with low estimates at about 64,000, but going as high as 300,000 practising homeopaths. In addition, there are 180 colleges teaching courses, and 7500 government clinics and 307 hospitals which dispense homeopathic remedies. The Ministry of AYUSH was formed on 9 November 2014 to ensure the optimal development and propagation of AYUSH systems of health care. Earlier it was known as the Department of Indian System of Medicine and Homeopathy (ISM&H) which was created in March 1995 and renamed as Department of Ayurveda, Yoga and Naturopathy, Unani, Siddha and Homoeopathy (AYUSH) in November 2003, with focused attention for development of Education and Research in Ayurveda, Yoga and Naturopathy, Unani, Siddha and Homoeopathy. In China and Japan, homeopathy appears to be almost unknown.

Asian countries many times were exposed to both homeopathic and non-homeopathic ideas about medicine through invading armies that had ties to Europe. In Malaysia, homeopathy was introduced during World War II by Indian military personnel that formed the bulk of the British army in Asia. The French army brought early modern medicine to Laos during their 1893 invasion. In China, Shanghai had one homeopathic hospital in 1911, and had four later in 1934. In this region, the European models of medicine complemented, but did not replace, the local traditional medicines.

=== Middle East ===
Homeopathy is becoming popular in the United Arab Emirates (UAE) and in Iran. The UAE Ministry of Health (MOH) recognizes and regulates the practice of homeopathy in a systematic way. Both medical doctors and lay practitioners can practise homeopathy but they all should pass MOH exams which cover both medical science and homeopathy. The Ministry of Health of Iran recognizes homeopathy as a legal alternative treatment. The Iranian Homeopathic Association, formed with the permission of the Ministry of the Interior and the Ministry of Health, is the reference association for providing standards of homeopathy. In Iran only medical doctors can practice homeopathy.

=== India ===
Homeopathy came to India in early 1810, with travelers, missionaries and military personnel from the West.

Homeopathy research and education is looked after by the Ministry of Ayurveda, Yoga & Naturopathy, Unani, Siddha and Homeopathy (AYUSH) formed on 9 November 2014, which also takes care of educational standards in the Indian Systems of Medicines and Homeopathy colleges and promotes research in respective fields. Central Council for Research in Homoeopathy (CCRH) was established as an autonomous organization at New Delhi in 1978 by the Government of India.

Homeopathic education is regulated by Central Council of Homoeopathy (CCH), a statutory body under the Ministry of Health & Family Welfare, formed in 1973 through Act of Parliament is one of Professional Councils of University Grants Commission (UGC), which monitors all higher education across India. The CCH also regulates the practice of registered homeopaths.

In 2007 in the state of Uttar Pradesh (population 166 million in 2001) there were 27,548 registered homeopathic practitioners compared with 38,950 medical doctors (referred to as allopaths by those practicing alternative medicine), and 59,783 ayurvedic and 14,905 unani practitioners.

The number of homeopathic doctors in India increased from 105,000 in 1980 to 246,000 in 2010, and the number of homeopathic hospitals/dispensaries increased fourfold — from 1,686 in 1980 to about 7,000 in 2010.

A national health survey in 2014 found that homeopathy was used by about 3% of the population.

== Africa ==
=== South Africa ===
In South Africa, homeopathy is currently regulated by the Allied Health Professions Act, 1982 (Act 63 of 1982) together with the Regulations to the said Act which was set up to provide for the establishment of a statutory body, the Allied Health Professions Council of South Africa (AHPCSA) to regulate the homeopathic profession, amongst ten others. The AHPCSA is one of five Statutory Health Professional Councils regulating health professions in South Africa. Any person wishing to practice Homeopathy in any way whatsoever within the borders of South Africa must be registered with the AHPCSA. Registration is a legal requirement and under South African Law it is a criminal offense to practice homeopathy without registration. Homeopathic registration in South Africa enjoys a standing, rights and privileges similar to that of conventional medical practitioners. This means that the legal scope of practice of a homeopathic practitioner is very similar to that of a conventional medical practitioner. The scope of practice includes also what would generally be applicable to Naturopathic practitioners in countries like the USA.

A Homeopathic Practitioner may diagnose, in fact being a diagnostic primary health care profession, a Homeopathic Practitioner is legally compelled to make a diagnosis and provide the appropriate ICD-10 diagnostic codes. Homeopathic Practitioners also have to be licensed to compound Homeopathic medicine and to dispense any medicine falling within their scope of practice. Both conventional pharmacology and Homoeopharmaceutics are a legal training requirement.

Training therefore is based upon the medical curriculum with homeopathy as the primary therapeutic focus. From this perspective it is understandable that (as for Medical Practitioners where the requirement for registration is a MBChB or equivalent) in the case of Homeopathy the requirement for registration is a master's degree in Homeopathy MTech(Hom) or equivalent.

Homeopathic practitioners are trained diagnosticians, recognised as primary contact practitioners. Whereas the vast majority of international homeopathic schools offer skills-oriented homeopathic training, South Africa offers professional training at a level required for the practising of homeopathy as a primary contact health profession in accordance with the scope of practice of such a profession.

All private Homeopathic colleges were closed during the late 1970s by the South African Department of Health (read the History and Development of Homeopathic Education in South Africa). Existing practitioners were put into a closed register and in terms of the new legislation, and medical doctors were allowed to keep practicing homeopathy regardless of their knowledge of the subject. Nowadays, the only training recognised by the AHPCSA is a five-year full-time master's degree in Homoeopathy offered at the University of Johannesburg and Durban University of Technology. The M.Tech(Hom) consists of a five-year full-time medico-scientific course based on the medical curriculum with the core focus on classical, clinical, modern and conventional homeopathy, Homoeopharmaceutics and ending with a masters research dissertation. Graduates are registered as Homoeopathic practitioners only after having completed their post-graduate internship.

The practice of homeopathy in South Africa requires medical training as prerequisite. Two routes thus exist for entrance into homeopathy, either via the medically based homeopathic master's degree course (MTech-Hom) or once a medical practitioner is registered for independent practice, by way of the Post Graduate Diploma in Homeopathy offered by the South African Faculty of Homoeopathy (SAFH). Medical practitioners may register as homeopathic practitioners only after successful completion of the post graduate diploma. Once registered, homeopathic practitioners may do the prescribed Compounding and Dispensing course through the University of Pretoria and thereafter apply for a License to Compound and Dispense Homeopathic Medicine from the National Department of Health.

22C. Licensing

(1) Subject to the provisions of this section-

(a) the Director-General may on application in the prescribed manner and on payment of the prescribed fee issue to a medical practitioner, dentist, practitioner, nurse or other person registered under the Health Professions Act, 1974, a licence to compound and dispense medicines, on the prescribed conditions;

(5) No person shall compound or dispense a medicine unless he or she is authorised thereto in terms of the Pharmacy Act, 1974, is a veterinarian or is the holder of a licence as contemplated in subsection(1)(a).

The Medicines Control Council was set up in 1965, and it put all types of medicine under the same standards. It was replaced in 1998 by the South African Medicines and Medical Devices Regulatory Authority, which placed separate procedures for registering regular and alternative medicines, in order to regulate them better.

=== Nigeria ===
Both medically qualified practitioners and lay persons can practice homeopathy, with the Congress of Homoeopathic Medicine Practitioners having 30 medical doctors on its register in 2005. The All-Nigeria Homeopathic Medical Organization was founded in 1961, and the first homeopathic practitioner, I. Okogeri, began practice the following year. The Nigerian College of Homoeopathic Medicine, founded in 1972, is recognised by the government of the East Central State. The Nigerian Institute of Homeopathy has special consultative status with the United Nations Department of Economic and Social Affairs.

== See also ==
- Regulation of therapeutic goods
