= Eric Ledermann =

German naturopath and psychiatrist

- Born: 16 May 1908; Berlin
- Died: 7 May 2005 (aged 96); London
- Occupation: Psychiatrist

Eric Kurt Ledermann (16 May 1908 – 7 May 2005) MRCS LRCP was a German psychiatrist, homeopath, naturopath and philosopher.

== Biography ==
Ledermann was born in 1908 to Jewish parents in Berlin. He studied medicine at the University of Freiburg and took interest in philosophical vitalism. He attended a lecture of Alfred Adler and was deeply influenced by his work. He also took influence from Jan Smuts' book Holism and Evolution. In 1932, he obtained his MD from the University of Freiburg.

He fled Nazi Germany in 1933 to become House Physician at Glasgow Homeopathic Hospital. He qualified at L.R.C.P. Edinburgh in 1934. He moved to London in 1935 to start his own medical practice. In 1936, he joined the Nature Cure Clinic where he practiced for over 50 years. He worked at the Children’s Homoeopathic Dispensary in Shepherds Bush for 20 years and joined the Royal London Homeopathic Hospital where he became consultant physician in 1965. He was a psychiatrist at Marlborough Day Hospital.

He married Marjorie Alice Smith on 2 June 1943. From 1948 he worked for the British National Health Service. He was a member of the Faculty of Homoeopathy and a Fellow of the Royal College of Psychiatrists. He was a lifelong vegetarian and exercised regularly. He was an anti-vaccinationist and a Medical Vice President for the National Anti-Vaccination League's The Vaccination Inquirer and Health Review.

Ledermann developed a type of psychotherapy he termed "true-self psychotherapy", which aimed to make "the unconscious conscience conscious". He took a holistic approach to medicine and authored several books on the topic. He opposed the "mechanistic materialism" of orthodox medicine. His holistic medicine was derived from existential and phenomenological philosophy. During his later years Ledermann researched acupuncture and in 2001 received an honorary membership of the Chinese Medical Institute and Register.

== Selected publications ==
- Status of Naturopathy (The British Medical Journal, 1951)
- Natural Therapy: An Exposition of the Scientific and Educational Aspects of Nature Cure (1953)
- Philosophy and Medicine (1970)
- Existential Neurosis (1972)
- Good Health Through Natural Therapy (1977)
- Ethics in Psychiatry: The Patient's Freedom and Bondage (Journal of Medical Ethics, 1982)
- Mental Health and Human Conscience (1985)
- Your Health in Your Hands: A Case for Natural Medicine (1989)
- Medicine for the Whole Person: A Critique of Scientific Medicine (1997)
