= Medical Service Ministries =

Trust organization supporting Christian missions

Today, Medical Service Ministries (since 1992) is a trust organization that provides support via grants to Christian mission affiliated applicants who are looking to further their specializations in courses such as community health and tropical medicine. Prior to 1992, Medical Service Ministries was known as the Missionary School of Medicine (1903-1992) and provided homeopathic training to Christian missionaries who found that they were ill-equipped to help themselves and others in a tropical climate. MSM was formed through the collaborative efforts of the London Homeopathic Hospital and the British Homeopathic Association in 1903. While class size was always relatively small, the 1990s showed particularly small class size. This spurred the Missionary School of Medicine to be renamed Medical Service Ministries in 1992. The implications behind the word “missionary” were thought to be driving students away. However, the increasing cost of running the school coupled with the demands brought on by qualifications required by many developing countries at this time caused MSM to close the school portion of the organization (1996) in order to become strictly a trust fund for funding applicants supported by Christian communities/organizations.

== Background ==
During the 19th century, many missionaries sought to expand trade and spread the Christian gospel in the developing British colonies. However, many found that they were ill-equipped in the tropical climate; many missionaries and their families became ill. Due to this lack of medical knowledge, many missionaries returned to England to receive first aid training at the end of the 19th century. As a supporter of the newly formed British Homeopathic Association, the London Homeopathic Hospital was one such place that offered to train missionaries in first aid. The British Homeopathic Association's Educational Committee ran these trainings in partnership with the London Homeopathic Hospital. Lectures were offered in both basic medicine and surgery. Finding increased interest from returning missionaries, in the autumn of 1903, the Missionary School of Medicine was opened at the London Homeopathic Hospital to accommodate the training. Upon its opening, Dr. Edwin A. Neatby became the first Dean of the Missionary School of Medicine, presiding over the 24 students enrolled in the school's first class.

== Mission and Work ==
=== Organization ===
The Missionary School of Medicine was organized with a President, and a general council. There were additionally a treasurer and a warden, responsible for both running the school day-to-day and teaching nursing procedures,

Presidents of the school include Edwin A. Neatby (beginning in 1903), H. Dodd (beginning in 1952), and Kathleen Priestman (serving from 1981-1991).

John Weir was a notable treasurer for the Missionary School of Medicine due to his contributions to the formation of the school's endowment fund. Wardens that served at the school include:

- Miss Goodwin (1903-1934)
- Miss Elizabeth Bargh (1934-1965)
- Miss Lyle Bottom (1965-1980)
- Mrs. Jean Hayward-Lynch (1980-1996)

The teaching staff included homeopathic physicians experienced in tropical medicine and other specialties. M Some of the teaching staff and their subjects include:

- Children's diseases: Donald Foubister and Kathleen Priestman
- Skin diseases: Alva Benjamin
- General medicine: Charles Wheeler, John MacKillop, Muriel Adams
- Surgery: W Eldon Tucker and P Cutner
- Dentistry: N E Gillham
- Podiatry: J N LeRossignol

=== Teaching Program ===
The teaching program was delivered over the course of three terms. Early course offerings included lectures in basic medicine and surgery, and later expanded to the other medical areas, as well as to Homeopathic pharmacy The goal of the curriculum was to enable missionaries to care for themselves, their families, and others when abroad and when there was no additional medical aid available. Lectures were held at The Wellcome Museum as well as at the London Homeopathic Hospital. The London Homeopathic Hospital also allowed students at their clinics and to study there. Further, St. John's Ambulance Association taught first aid at the school.

Upon graduation from the school, graduates received both homeopathic remedies and certificates. The remedies were donated by homeopathic pharmacies that were involved in teaching at the school, and were given to the graduates to take with them on their missions.

=== Finances ===
In the early 1900s, the “Scholarship Fund” was formed by Reverend Omri Jenkins. It was hoped that an endowment fund could be created from this to cover costs of running the school. The treasurer was responsible for overseeing this fund. Treasurer John Weir was particularly successful in gathering donations for the fund, attracting funds through private connections.

In addition to these funds, student fees were used to help cover the cost of running the school. Since student fees were kept low, they never could fully cover the cost of running the school. Here is a progression of the student fees at the school:

- 1909-1926: full-time course cost six guineas per student
- 1950s: one term cost 30 guineas per student
- 1978: one term cost £50 per student
- 1979-1980: one term cost £400 per student (only 15 students enrolled)

=== Students ===
Most students were sponsored by the Missionary Societies that sent them abroad. MSM students were supported by 115 different Societies.

Many different countries were represented in MSM. From the 1960s to the 1970s, students came from England, Japan, Norway, Germany, and Korea. In the 1980s, students also came from Angola, the Netherlands, Indonesia, South America, Finland, India, Kenya, Spain, Sri Lanka, and Switzerland.

In the first 50 years of the school, class sizes ranged from 20-30 students. In later years, class sizes were much less, averaging to about 10 students or less per class.

=== Graduates ===
Upon graduating from the school, many graduates went abroad to serve in places including Africa, Japan, South America, India, and Iceland. Supported by home churches and mission organizations, many graduates set up clinics in the places where they served. Often, the clinics and Mission hospitals in which MSM graduates worked formed the basic network for the development of healthcare in many countries.

=== Homeopathy and Natural Medicines ===
Main articles: Homeopathy

Homeopathy and natural medicine were the focus of the studies of the students at MSM.

Two main principles guide the use of medicine in homeopathy: the Similia Principle and the Dose. The Similia Principle states that a substance that can cause a symptom complex in a healthy person can be used to treat similar symptoms in a sick person. The Dose states that the quantity of medicine used should be the smallest possible to affect a cure and should not be repeated as long as improvement lasts. In addition, MSM focused on the use of natural medicine. Natural medicine seeks to combine the advantages of both traditional and modern medicine. Traditional medicine refers to the use of knowledge of the use of locally grown plants coupled with an understanding of the language and culture of local villages. Modern medicine refers to the use of drugs that are regulated and produced to a high standard. Through combining these two types of medicine, natural medicine seeks to develop a new culturally appropriate and cost effective health service.

=== MSM Moves ===
In 1925, the London Homeopathic Hospital found that it needed the study room it lent to MSM as a place for it to train its own nurses. As a result, the school moved from London Homeopathic Hospital to 2 Powis Place, where it remained until it closed in 1996.

=== Aims of the School ===
In 1936, John Weir (treasurer), stated the aims of the Missionary School of Medicine:

1. To enable missionaries to look after their own health.
2. To enable missionaries to nurse and treat one another on the mission field when ill or miles away from medical aid.
3. To enable missionaries to start dispensaries for the local people and so open the door for the gospel tidings.

=== A New Name for MSM ===
While class size was always relatively small, the 1990s showed particularly small class size. Leaders in the school assumed that lack of interest could be attributed to the implications of the word “missionary” in modern day culture. As a result, the Missionary School of Medicine was renamed Medical Service Ministries in 1992. One goal of the renaming was to attract more students to take their 10-week summer courses. However, as class size did not show a significant improvement, the school closed in 1996.

== Closing of the School and Conversion to a Trust ==
=== From School to Trust ===
The 1990s showed a major development in the health ministries of emerging nations, like Africa. As a result, these developing nations requested that those offering medical treatment have required registered qualifications. In order to provide academically recognized qualifications, Medical Service Ministries found that it would have to merge with a university. However, since class sizes were so small and the cost to run the school was only increasing, Medical Service Ministries decided to discontinue training in 1996.

When the school closed, investment income was transferred to the Scholarship Fund, reducing administration costs. As a result, with the work of the Administrator of Trust, Mrs. Glennis Powling, Medical Service Ministries was able to make its financial resources available to fund applicants traveling elsewhere.

=== MSM Today ===
As a grant-making trust, Medical Service Ministries provides grants to candidates undertaking specialist training in these areas:

- Child health
- Community healthcare
- Disaster relief
- Midwifery
- Palliative care
- Travel and tropical medicine

In addition, MSM generally considers funding applicants who are primary healthcare trainers or workers in impoverished areas of underdeveloped countries. Further, applicants must show evidence of sponsorship or support of a Christian mission or local community.

One example of a trust fund applicant success story can be found in Tamara Filmer, a missionary working in rural, undeveloped Nepal. Filmer writes:

“With MSM’s assistance I was able to attend training in logistics and management regarding pharmaceuticals. In December 2012, I travelled from the mid-west of Nepal to India’s capital, Delhi, to attend a two-week course entitled “International Procurement and Supply Chain Management”. ... I want to thank Medical Service Ministries and their supporters for the funding that enabled me to attend this course. On our missionary living allowance, it just wouldn't have been possible to afford the course, so I am grateful for this opportunity.”

=== Mission statement ===
The current mission statement of Medical Service Ministries is as follows:

“To encourage full-time Christian workers in the UK and elsewhere to prepare for Personal and Community Healthcare work in the developing world, in association with Christian organizations, and to witness to their faith in obedience to Christ’s command to preach and heal. Funding is available for approved healthcare candidates.”

Recently retired treasurer, Brian Weller, shows that this mission statement is alive in the everyday actions of MSM and its leadership when he states: “It is my belief that overseas Christian service in response to Our Lord’s commission to preach and heal calls for continued effort and support, and will not lack His supply as we rise to the challenge. Our vision is to make healthcare accessible and to raise standards. It will continue to be achieved through individuals called by God to play their part here at home and overseas.”
