= Maurice Slevin =

British medical oncologist

- Citizenship: United Kingdom
- Education: University of Cape Town
- Occupation: Oncologist
- Known for: Cancerbackup
- Medical career
- Research: Oncology

Maurice Slevin is a British medical oncologist specialising in the treatment of breast, ovarian and gastrointestinal cancers. He has made contributions to the field through both his clinical practise and research. He practised at St Bartholomew's Hospital and was a founding partner of Leaders in Oncology Care (LOC) on Harley Street.

== Education ==
Slevin graduated from the University of Cape Town and completed his postgraduate training at Groote Schuur Hospital in Cape Town and St Bartholomew's Hospital in London, where he worked as head of chemotherapy for solid cancers. He is a Fellow of the Royal College of Physicians.

== Career ==
His research primarily focused on clinical pharmacology, with particular emphasis on etoposide and cytosine arabinoside, as well as psychosocial oncology. He has published over 150 peer-reviewed papers in academic journals and has an h-index of 58.

He helped establish the cancer support charity Cancerbackup, which he chaired from 1985 to 2008, when it merged with Macmillan.

Slevin and his colleagues carried out a study, funded by the Imperial Cancer Research Fund, which showed that cancer patients were more likely to opt for radical and intensive treatment with minimal chance of benefit than were their doctors.

Slevin gained attention for his controversial papers on the National Health Service (NHS), where he argued that reform was more crucial than increased funding. He suggested that the NHS had almost as many managers as nurses, a claim that was slammed by the NHS federation. He led a movement in 2000 demanding a wholesale overhaul of NHS treatment of the disease, along with Karol Sikora, in which they argued for faster cancer treatment timelines.

Slevin was a founder member of Doctors for Reform, a group of 1000 consultants who advocated a social insurance model of funding the NHS.

== Publications ==
Slevin has over 150 published peer-reviewed papers in academic journals, including:

- Slevin, M L; Clark, P I; Joel, S P; Malik, S; Osborne, R J; Gregory, W M; Lowe, D G; Reznek, R H; Wrigley, P F (1989). "A randomized trial to evaluate the effect of schedule on the activity of etoposide in small-cell lung cancer". Journal of Clinical Oncology. 7 (9): 1333–1340. doi:10.1200/JCO.1989.7.9.1333. ISSN 0732-183X. PMID 2549204.
- Clark, P I; Slevin, M L; Joel, S P; Osborne, R J; Talbot, D I; Johnson, P W; Reznek, R; Masud, T; Gregory, W; Wrigley, P F (1994). "A randomized trial of two etoposide schedules in small-cell lung cancer: the influence of pharmacokinetics on efficacy and toxicity". Journal of Clinical Oncology. 12 (7): 1427–1435. doi:10.1200/JCO.1994.12.7.1427. ISSN 0732-183X. PMID 8021734.
- Slevin, M L (1990). "Low-dose oral etoposide: a new role for an old drug?". Journal of Clinical Oncology. 8 (10): 1607–1609. doi:10.1200/JCO.1990.8.10.1607. ISSN 0732-183X. PMID 2170588.
- Slevin, M L; Piall, E M; Aherne, G W; Harvey, V J; Johnston, A; Lister, T A (1983). "Effect of dose and schedule on pharmacokinetics of high-dose cytosine arabinoside in plasma and cerebrospinal fluid". Journal of Clinical Oncology. 1 (9): 546–551. doi:10.1200/JCO.1983.1.9.546. ISSN 0732-183X. PMID 6583325.
- Slevin ML, Piall EM, Aherne GW, Johnston A, Sweatman MC, Lister TA (October 1981). "The pharmacokinetics of subcutaneous cytosine arabinoside in patients with acute myelogenous leukaemia". British Journal of Clinical Pharmacology. 12 (4): 507–10. doi:10.1111/j.1365-2125.1981.tb01258.x. PMC 1401912. PMID 6945865.
- Slevin ML, Stubbs L, Plant HJ, Wilson P, Gregory WM, Armes PJ, Downer SM (June 1990). "Attitudes to chemotherapy: comparing views of patients with cancer with those of doctors, nurses, and general public". BMJ (Clinical Research Ed.). 300 (6737): 1458–60. doi:10.1136/bmj.300.6737.1458. PMC 1663147. PMID 2379006.
- Slevin M, Mossman J, Bowling A, Leonard R, Steward W, Harper P, McIllmurray M, Thatcher N (June 1995). "Volunteers or victims: patients' views of randomised cancer clinical trials". British Journal of Cancer. 71 (6): 1270–4. doi:10.1038/bjc.1995.245. PMC 2033847. PMID 7779722.
- Slevin ML, Terry Y, Hallett N, Jefferies S, Launder S, Plant R, Wax H, McElwain T (September 1988). "BACUP--the first two years: evaluation of a national cancer information service". BMJ (Clinical Research Ed.). 297 (6649): 669–72. doi:10.1136/bmj.297.6649.669. PMC 1834344. PMID 3140928.
