= Cancerbackup =

British charity for people affected by cancer

- Formation: 1984
- Founder: Vicky Clement-Jones
- Type: Charitable organisation
- Purpose: Cancer patient support and information
- Region served: United Kingdom
- Key people: Vicky Clement-Jones (Founder and Chairman); Maurice Slevin (Chairman, 1987–2008)
- Website: www.macmillan.org.uk/cancer-information-and-support
- Formerly called: BACUP; CancerBACUP

Cancerbackup was a UK charity that provided information and support for cancer patients and their families. Founded in 1984 as BACUP, the charity operated as an independent entity until 2008, when it merged with Macmillan.

== History ==
Vicky Clement-Jones launched BACUP (British Association of Cancer United Patients and their families and friends) in October 1985 as a cancer information service. Clement-Jones was elected chairman and Honorary Director and Maurice Slevin was elected Deputy chairman. On her death in 1987, Slevin took over as chairman and chaired Cancerbackup from 1987 to 2008, when it merged with Macmillan.

According to Clement-Jones, the intention was to "kick cancer out of the closet" and end "the conspiracy of silence" affecting cancer patients and their families and friends, which was very prevalent at that time. The name BACUP was changed to CancerBACUP in 1998 and to Cancerbackup in 2006, in an effort to more clearly define what the charity did.

In 1985, there was no publicly available internet, and Cancerbackup provided the only publicly available cancer information service at that time, via telephone, e-mail, and letter and also produced booklets on all common cancers as well as hundreds of factsheets on individual cancer drugs.

In the first two years, over 30,000 inquiries were received: 23,527 (80%) were from women, 9,445 (32%) were from cancer patients, 11,574 (39%) were from relatives of patients, and 2,869 (10%) were from health professionals. By 2010, Cancerbackup was helping over 50,000 cancer patients and their families per year.

In 1997, in the early days of the internet, Cancerbackup launched its website with all its publications available in full online. The new site designed for cancer patients featured over 1,500 pages of cancer information covering all aspects of cancer, plus a searchable database of over 700 support groups and organisations for cancer patients in the UK.

In 2008, Cancerbackup merged with Macmillan Cancer Support, a British charity that provides specialist health care, information, and financial support to people affected by cancer, and Macmillan Cancer Support has continued to provide and expand the service.

== See also ==
- Macmillan Cancer Support
