= Karol Sikora =

British physician specialising in oncology

- Born: June 17, 1948 (age 78); UK
- Education: Dulwich College, University of Cambridge, Stanford University
- Known for: Oncology
- Scientific career
- Fields: Medicine, Oncology
- Workplaces: Royal Postgraduate Medical School; University of Buckingham

Karol Sikora (born 17 June 1948) is a British physician specialising in oncology, who has been described as a leading authority on cancer. He was a founder and medical director of Rutherford Health, a company that provided proton therapy services, and is Director of Medical Oncology at the Bahamas Cancer Centre.

He is currently Professor of Medicine at the University of Buckingham, and a partner in and dean of Buckingham's medical school.

== Early life ==
Karol Sikora was born in 1948. His father was a captain in the Polish Army who arrived in Great Britain during World War II and his mother was a Scottish schoolteacher. His childhood was spent in Edinburgh, Stafford and London.

He attended Dulwich College on a London County Council scholarship before going to Corpus Christi College, Cambridge where he became a Foundation Scholar and obtained a double first. He received his PhD at Stanford University, where he also served a clinical fellowship.

== Career ==
After leaving Stanford University, Sikora returned to Cambridge to direct the Ludwig Institute for Cancer Research. From 1985 to 1997, he served as the clinical director for cancer services at Hammersmith Hospital in London, where he established a cancer research laboratory, and was Professor of International Cancer Medicine at the Royal Postgraduate Medical School, later the Imperial College School of Medicine. During the 1990s Sikora was also deputy director of clinical research at charity the Imperial Cancer Research Fund, the predecessor to Cancer Research UK.

In 1997 he became the Chief of the Cancer Program of the World Health Organization before resigning in 1999 over a disagreement with the UN regarding their proposals to restructure work on non-communicable diseases, stating this would create a "top-heavy bureaucracy". He served as the Vice-President of Global Clinical Research in Oncology at the Pharmacia Corporation from 1999 to 2002. He has also been a member of the UK Health Department's Expert Advisory Group on Cancer, as well as the Committee on Safety of Medicines.

In 2022, Rutherford Health, a company he founded in 2015 and was Medical Director of, was liquidated. He is dean of the University of Buckingham's medical school, the only private medical school in the UK. He is also a member of the Oncology Scientific Advisory Board at biopharmaceutical company Cyclacel Limited, and serves as an oncology consultant for AstraZeneca. Sikora also served as the Interim Director of Radiation Oncology for the newly constructed Cancer Centre Eastern Caribbean in Antigua.

He is an unpaid member of the Meat Advisory Panel, a group of scientists that provide information and advice about meat as part of a balanced diet, and is patron of several cancer and other charities, including Medical Detection Dogs, which trains dogs to detect the odour of human disease to assist in diagnosis.

Sikora has published over 300 papers and written or edited 20 books, notably the "standard" UK postgraduate textbook Treatment of Cancer. He appeared in Michael Apted's 1999 documentary film Me & Isaac Newton, which featured interviews with scientists and researchers.

== Criticism of National Health Service ==
Sikora is known for his outspoken views on National Health Service (NHS) reform, and has written for the Times, the Observer, the New Statesman, and other publications on the subject. He has been critical of the quality of cancer care available on the NHS and has argued for its restructuring, suggesting that while the UK spends as much per patient on cancer care as the rest of Europe, survival rates are substantially lower: "there are 10 new drugs routinely available in Boulogne but not in Brighton".

Along with Maurice Slevin, he argued that the NHS should offer faster cancer treatment timelines.

In a 2017 Newsnight opinion piece, he described the NHS as "the last bastion of communism – it is a monolithic, unmanageable and inefficient system [...] the staff are great but the system is not". He proposed instead regarding it as a tax-based insurance scheme covering "basic costs", and allowing private providers to enter the market.

An interview with Sikora, in which he suggested the NHS system led to patients losing control over their own healthcare, was featured in a May 2009 Republican Party attack ad in the US during US President Barack Obama's push to enact healthcare reform. Sikora later told The Guardian that he did not know his interview would be used in the ad campaign, and that he agreed with Obama that the main problems with the American system were "the high cost of medical treatment" and the large number of uninsured people.

In a piece published online by the New Hampshire Union Leader the same day as the advertisement, Sikora was referred to as professor of oncology at Imperial College. This led Imperial to seek legal advice to stop Sikora being referred to as a current professor of cancer medicine at Imperial; a claim that he was also alleged to have made earlier in the previous five years. On 29 January 2009, Sikora was said to have introduced himself to a Commons health select committee as "...professor of oncology at Imperial College for 22 years." Prior to 2004, Sikora had held the honorary post of Professor of Cancer Medicine at the Imperial College School of Medicine, Hammersmith, having been the founding chair of cancer medicine at its predecessor, the Royal Postgraduate Medical School.

In the context of the National Institute for Health and Care Excellence (NICE) considering whether to apply age criteria when prescribing expensive drugs, he suggested that "within limited budgets" younger patients might be given priority over the frail elderly.

== Views on alternative medicine ==
Sikora has in the past suggested that alternative or "complementary" medicine might have some utility in providing psychological care to cancer patients; he has commented "I personally don't think that complementary medicine is itself a cure [...] but I do believe it [...] allows you to get on top of the fact that you have cancer and live with it in a way that doesn't disturb you psychologically too much". He has stated that after being invited in the 1980s to work with the Bristol Cancer Help Centre, which employed complementary therapists alongside conventional medicine, he came to believe that complementary therapies such as counselling or acupuncture could "help patients to complete their course of orthodox treatment" and "improve quality of life".

Sikora was a Foundation Fellow of Prince Charles' now-defunct alternative medicine lobby group The Prince's Foundation for Integrated Health. He is also a "professional member" of the College of Medicine, a patient-oriented healthcare lobby group also linked to the Prince of Wales that appeared shortly after the collapse of the FIH. Correspondents to the British Medical Journal have criticised the College for its promotion of alternative medicine, claims which it has contested. Sikora is on the advisory panel of complementary cancer care charity Penny Brohn Cancer Care (formerly the Bristol Cancer Help Centre) of which Prince Charles is a patron, and is a patron of the Iain Rennie Hospice at Home.

The pharmacologist David Colquhoun noted that the School of Medicine at Buckingham University, of which Sikora is Dean, had briefly offered a diploma in "integrated medicine" (a euphemism for alternative medicine) run by the "Faculty of Integrated Medicine", adding that Sikora's own views on the subject were a "mystery wrapped in an enigma".

Sikora has however, elsewhere been critical of alternative medicine; after Parliament member Lord Maurice Saatchi proposed a bill allowing doctors to use unproven experimental therapies, he noted that this could give false hope to terminally ill patients. He has contrasted therapies having "a profound psychological base", such as counselling, with others "founded on completely spurious pseudoscientific logic".

== Release of Abdelbaset al-Megrahi ==
In September 2009, the man convicted of the Pan Am Flight 103 bombing, Abdelbaset al-Megrahi, was released from a Scottish prison on compassionate grounds. The Daily Telegraph reported that Sikora, along with Professors Jonathan Waxman and Ibrahim Sharif, was one of three doctors hired by the Libyan government to assess Megrahi's condition prior to the release.

Sikora's report concluded that Megrahi would "likely" die within three months due to terminal prostate cancer; Sharif agreed and Waxman conceded Megrahi did not have long to live. Megrahi outlived the prognosis and died on 20 May 2012, two years and nine months after his release. Sikora later denied that he had been pressured by Libya to agree Megrahi had under three months to live: "on the balance of probability, you could justify that [claim], but you couldn't say he was definitely going to be dead in three months". The Scottish government confirmed Sikora's report was not used by the Scottish Justice Minister in making the decision to release Megrahi, which was instead based on their own medical reports and input from the parole board and governor.

Sikora has since complained about the way journalists have reported his views and stated that he was not paid to make claims, and there was probably a less than one percent chance of Megrahi living 10 years.

== Commentary on UK response to COVID-19 ==
Sikora has commented in the UK media on the UK's public health response to COVID-19, expressing concerns that policies of lockdown could impact treatment of other conditions, particularly cancer. On 21 September 2020, Sikora alongside Carl Heneghan, Sunetra Gupta and 28 other signatories, wrote an open letter to top UK government officials asking for a rethink to the Covid strategy. It called for a targeted approach to lockdowns advising that only over-65s and the vulnerable should be shielded.

== Works ==
- Interferon and cancer, 1983
- Clinical Physiology (with Campbell, Dickinson, Slater and Edwards), 1984
- Endocrine Problems in Cancer (with Roland T. Jung), 1984
- Monoclonal Antibodies (with Howard Smedley), 1984
- Molecular Biology and Human Disease (with Sandy McCleod), 1984
- Cancer – what it is and how it's treated (with Rob Stepney and Howard Smedley), 1985
- Cancer – a study guide (with Howard Smedley), 1985
- Cancer (with Howard Smedley), 1988
- The Molecular Biology of Cancer (with Jonathan Waxman), 1989
- Fight Cancer (with Hilary Thomas), 1989
- Treatment of Cancer (with Keith Halnan and Pat Price), 1990, 1995, 2002, 2008
- Genes and Cancer (editor), 1990
- The cancer cell (with Gerard Evan and James Watson), 1991
- Human genetic therapy (with Jonathan Harris), 1994
- Cancer: a positive approach (with Hilary Thomas), 1995
- Handbook of oncology (with Victor Barley and Jeff Tobias), 1998, 2004
- The Realities of Rationing (with John Spiers et al.), 1999
- The cancer survival kit (with Rosy Daniel), 2004
- Cancer 2025: The future of cancer care (editor), 2005
- Economics of Cancer Care (with Nick Bosanquet), 2006
