= John Weir (physician) =

Scottish physician and homeopath

- Born: 19 October 1879; Paisley, Scotland
- Died: 17 April 1971 (aged 91)
- Education: University of Glasgow
- Occupations: Physician, homeopath

Sir John Weir GCVO (19 October 1879 – 17 April 1971) was a Scottish physician and homeopath who served as Physician Royal to several twentieth-century monarchs.

== Early life and education ==
Weir was born in the town of Paisley, in Renfrewshire, son of joiner James Weir, of East Kilbride, and Agnes, née Baird. He attended Allan Glen's School in Glasgow, a school noted for its emphasis on science, and subsequently worked as an engineer until embarking on his medical education, first at the University of Glasgow (MB ChB 1906), following which he held several positions at the Glasgow Western Infirmary.

He was awarded a Tyler scholarship to study homoeopathy at Hering Medical College, Chicago under James Tyler Kent during 1908–9, along with H. Fergie Woods and Douglas Borland.

== Career ==
Weir was appointed Consultant Physician at the London Homeopathic Hospital in 1910, and was appointed the Compton-Burnett Professor of Materia Medica in 1911; he would become President of the Faculty of Homeopathy in 1923.

Weir became Physician Royal to King George V (reigned 1910–36; Weir his physician from 1918), King Edward VIII (reigned 1936), King George VI (reigned 1936–52), Queen Elizabeth II (physician 1952–68), and King Haakon VII (1872–1957) of Norway, whose wife Maud (1869–1938) was the youngest daughter of King Edward VII (1841–1910).

Weir reputedly first learned of homeopathy through his contact with Dr Robert Gibson Miller (1862–1919) head of the Glasgow Homeopathic Hospital, who had an important influence on the future Physician Royal, who he treated for boils and converted to homeopathy [Bodman, 1971]. "It was Dr Gibson Miller who advised Sir John Weir to go to the United States." [Stewart, 1967, p. 260] This influence tended to be passed on: Dr Douglas Gibson (1888–1977) "became interested in homeopathy in 1936 through a meeting with Sir John Weir," [Gibson obit, 1977, 225].

He spoke on homeopathy before the Royal Society of Medicine in 1932, and was knighted by King George V that same year. The renovated Manchester Homoeopathic Institute and Dispensary was opened in Oxford Street by Sir John Weir in May 1939. Weir said in an "address: homeopathy…is no religion, no sect, no fad, no humbug…remedies do not act directly on disease; they merely stimulate the vital reactions of the patient, and this causes him to cure himself." [Sir John Weir, 1931, 200-201] Having advanced through all levels of the Royal Victorian Order he was, as a rare distinction, awarded the Royal Victorian Chain in 1949, possibly as a mark of the medical care he gave to the ailing King George VI.

== Publications ==
- Homeopathy and its Importance in Treatment of Chronic Disease (1915)
- The Trend of Modern Medicine (1922)
- The Science and Art of Homeopathy, British Homoeopathic Journal (1925)
- The Present Day Attitude of the Medical Profession Towards Homeopathy, British Homoeopathic Journal XVI, 1926, p. 212ff
- Homeopathy: a System of Therapeutics (1928)
- "The Hahnemann Convalescent Home, Bournemouth", British Homoeopathic Journal 20, 1931, 200–201
- Homeopathy: An Explanation of its Principles (1932)
- "British Homeopathy During the Last 100 Years", British Homoeopathic Journal 23, 1932: II, pp. 603–5
- "Samuel Hahnemann and his Influence on Medical Thought", Trans. Roy. Soc. Med. (1933)
- Hahnemann on Homeopathic Philosophy (1935)

== Sources ==
- The Medical Directory 1948
- Nisbet's Medical Directory, 1913
- T Fergus Stewart, Dr Tom Paterson, Brit Homeo Jnl, 56, 1967, pp. 257–60
- Obituary, The Times 19–4–1971
- Dr Margery Blackie, Obituary to Sir John Weir, Brit Homeo Jnl 60, 1971, pp. 103–4
- Dr Frank Bodman, Obituary to Sir John Weir, Brit Homeo Jnl 60:1, 1971, pp. 224–8
- Anonymous, Obituary to Dr Douglas Gibson, Brit. Homeo. Jnl 66, 1977, p. 225
- Weir's entry in the Oxford Dictionary of National Biography
