= Douglas Macmillan =

English cancer charity founder (1884–1969)

Douglas Macmillan MBE FRSS
- Born: 10 August 1884; Castle Cary, Somerset, England
- Died: 9 January 1969 (aged 84); Castle Cary, Somerset, England
- Education: Birkbeck, University of London
- Occupations: Civil servant, activist, charity founder
- Years active: 1911–1945
- Known for: Founding Macmillan Cancer Support
- Spouses: Margaret Fielding Miller (m. 1907; died 1957) Nora Primrose Owen (m. 1958)

Douglas Macmillan MBE FRSS (10 August 1884 – 9 January 1969) was an English civil servant, vegetarianism activist and founder of the Macmillan Cancer Support charity, now one of the largest charities in the UK.

== Early life and education ==
Douglas Macmillan was born on 10 August 1884, in Castle Cary, Somerset, the seventh of eight children of William Macmillan (1844–1911) and his wife Emily, formerly White (1843–1937). His father became managing director of John Boyd & Co. (manufacturers of horsehair-based products), was a Somerset County Alderman, and for 15 years edited and published the monthly Castle Cary Visitor.

Macmillan was educated at Sexey's School, Bruton (1894–1897), the Quaker Sidcot School, Winscombe (1897–1901), and then at Birkbeck, University of London in 1901.

== Career ==
Macmillan entered the civil service in London in 1902. He worked as a civil servant for more than forty years – in the Board of Agriculture and later in the Ministry of Agriculture and Fisheries. He retired as a staff officer in 1945, having been made MBE, for his government service, the previous year. He specialised in public health and was elected a member of the Royal Institute of Public Health and Hygiene. He was a Fellow of the Royal Statistical Society.

He was prominent in the affairs of the Society of Somerset Folk in London, founding and chairing its Arts Circle which promoted interest in folklore and dialect, drama, literature and music. He edited the Society's journal, the Somerset Year Book, from 1921 to 1932 and was Director of its London-based publishing arm, Folk Press Ltd. Among Folk Press's numerous publications in the 1920s were several monographs on historical topics by Macmillan and two volumes of his poetry (Sea Drift and By Camel and Cary) which contain verses celebrating some of the districts that lie along the route now known as the Macmillan Way West.

== Founding cancer charity ==
Macmillan was a Baptist but also influenced by Quakerism. He published the magazine The Better Quest in 1911 "devoted to truth and humaneness" which supported animal welfare and Christian vegetarianism. In March 1911, Macmillan authored an article "In Cancer's Clutch" which suggested that "cancer is the fault of sin". Macmillan argued that meat eating was a major cause of cancer and the first chapter of the Book of Genesis supported a vegetarian way of life. He was a staunch anti-vivisectionist and believed that good health was linked to Godliness and thus opposed conventional cancer treatments that took research from animal experimentation.

In July, 1911 Macmillan's father died of cancer. This made a profound impression on him. The following year, despite having no medical background himself, he set up the Society for the Prevention and Relief of Cancer, with a donation of £10. The aim was to establish what caused cancer and how best to treat it. In founding the Society, Macmillan "wanted to see homes for cancer patients throughout the land, where attention will be provided freely or at low cost, as circumstances dictate... [and]... panels of voluntary nurses who can be detailed off to attend to necessitous patients in their own homes."

Macmillan's Society was strictly anti-vivisectionist. In the Society's first publication, Macmillan stated that the new organization "had no connection or any sympathy whatever with existing systems of cancer research, the representatives of which appear to be persuaded that "research" means "vivisection". In a 1912 leaflet for his Society he argued that the cause of cancer was known and that the one reasonable and reliable treatment was also known but was denied by medical and surgical orthodoxy. He stated that the cure and treatment of cancer could be found with the application of vegetarian dietetic principles rather than the surgeon's knife. The first annual meeting for the Society for the Prevention and Relief of Cancer was held on 12 December 1912 at Macmillan's house in Belgravia. In 1912, Charles W. Forward was elected Chairman of the Society. Members included Frederic Cardew, Robert Bell (who became president), the Duchess of Hamilton (the first patron) and Vice-presidents Lord Charles Beresford, Roy Horniman, George William Kekewich, Sir John Kirk and Lizzy Lind af Hageby. Medical practitioners that were elected included Charles Reinhardt, H. Fergie Woods and J. Stenson Hooker. In 1912, the Society had 44 members.

The Society for the Prevention and Relief of Cancer released five pamphlets on cancer published in a collection called the Cancer Crusade Series. All but one of the booklets were written by Macmillan. The first was Robert Bell's The Prevention and Relief of Cancer which argued for a vegetarian diet high in fruit and vegetables to prevent cancer. The second Crusade pamphlet written by Macmillan was The Tea-Habit in Relation to Cancer, which argued that stimulants such as caffeine and tannic acid found in tea cause inflammation in the body. The pamphlet ranked tea with alcohol, meat and tobacco as a cause of cancer. Macmillan also authored On the Use of Violet Leaves which advocated the use of violet leaves in various forms as a cancer treatment. The most significant Pamphlet of the series was entitled The Cancer Mortality Statistics of England & Wales 1851-1910, published in 1913 and became known as the "blue book". It was a comprehensive examination of statistics of cancer mortality in England and Wales over a period of sixty years. Macmillan's analysis included a county map that showed different deaths rates of cancer. The last pamphlet was on anti-vivisection and cited the research of Bell, Stenson Hooker and other doctors that vivisection was not an ethical or productive route for cancer research.

The Society also published The Journal of Cancer and in 1913 adopted an emblem of a drawing of the ancient statue of Apollo with the ancient proverb nullum numen abest si sit prudentia, which meant where there is prudence, there will be divine protection. This was based on the idea that knowledge and a prudent lifestyle would prevent cancer. The Society's income suffered during World War I and it struggled to distribute copies of its journal and pamphlets. In 1918, the Society's honorary solicitor Lieutenant Charles Deards was killed in action. At that time the National Health Service (NHS) had yet to be established; registration of nurses was not introduced until 1919. No health and safety acts had been passed by Parliament, and public health had yet to become a priority for the state.

In 1922, the Society's journal folded and there was only limited financial support. The Society failed to obtain new members and through deaths and resignations its member list declined. The Society had no paid staff and relied on the voluntary work of Macmillan, his wife and other members. Because of the Society's anti-vivisection and vegetarian views it alienated potential supporters from the medical community. Initially Macmillan ran the charity while continuing to work full-time as a civil servant. He was aided by his wife, but only after twelve years did he take on his first volunteer assistant. In 1924, he and the charity moved to Knoll Road, Sidcup. In 1930 they recruited a first full-time member of staff, and the offices were relocated to Victoria in 1936. In the 1930s, the Society's income and membership increased and its welfare work for patients became more widespread across the UK. Although Macmillan remained a vegetarian in his personal life the Society's early campaign for anti-vivisection and vegetarianism was dropped and it was now supporting poor cancer patients with meat extracts. The old emblem was also discarded. The new emblem in 1931 was a picture of a distressed woman standing outside an occupied bedroom used to reflect the pain and despair of cancer. The Society became known as the National Society for Cancer Relief, and often shorthand, Cancer Relief.

Macmillan retired from running the organisation in 1966, in which year he moved from Sidcup back to Castle Cary. The organisation he founded has since flourished and is today known as Macmillan Cancer Support.

== Personal life ==
Macmillan married Margaret Fielding Miller in 1907, and the couple afterwards lived in her parents' house at 15 Ranelagh Road, Pimlico, which provided office space for the Folk Press operation and served as the first headquarters of the Cancer Relief charity. Margaret was a vice-president of the charity and organised its annual sale of work. She died, from cancer, in 1957 and in the following year Macmillan married Nora Primrose Owen. He had no children.

Macmillan was a vegetarian. In 1909, he wrote an open letter to all Christians entitled "Shall we slay?", which encouraged them to consider vegetarianism.

== Death and legacy ==
Macmillan died of cancer on 9 January 1969 at his home Carylande, Ansford in Castle Cary, aged 84.

A blue plaque was erected to honour him at his former residence of 15 Ranelagh Road, Pimlico, in 1997 and another in 2019 at his birthplace in Castle Cary. In October 2010, The Bexley Civic Society invited the Mayor of Bexley, Cllr Val Clark, to unveil another plaque on his house in Knoll Road, Sidcup where he lived for 30 years.

== Selected publications ==
- Shall We Slay? (1909)
- The Better Quest (1911)
- On the Use of Violet Leaves (1913)
- The Tea-Habit in Relation to Cancer (1913)
- Cancer Research and Vivisection (1919)
