= H. Fergie Woods =

English physician and homeopath

H. Fergie Woods LRCP MRCS
- Born: Harold Fergie Woods; 1883
- Died: 15 January 1961 (aged 77–78)
- Occupations: Physician, writer

Harold Fergie Woods LRCP MRCS (1883 – 15 January 1961) was an English physician, homeopath and anti-vivisection activist.

== Biography ==
Woods qualified L.R.C.P. and M.R.C.S. from Middlesex Hospital in 1908. After he qualified, he went to the United States with John Weir to study homeopathy under James Tyler Kent. Woods had a long career at the Royal London Homeopathic Hospital where he was Resident Medical Officer, Physician for Diseases of Children and a Consulting Physician. In 1925, he co-founded the International Homoeopathic League.

Woods was a staunch opponent of vaccination and vivisection. He was a member of the British Union for the Abolition of Vivisection and gave speeches at anti-vivisection meetings. He stated that animal experimentation is scientifically useless and unethical as the animals are kept in mutilated and suffering conditions for considerable periods. Woods concluded that abolition of vivisection is the only way to protect animals. He was a Vice-President of the National Anti-Vaccination League. In 1945, Woods signed a petition for the formation of a group of homeopathy within the British Medical Association.

Woods was a germ theory denialist who held the view that germs were the result, not the cause of disease. He was an elected medical member of Douglas Macmillan's Society for the Prevention and Relief of Cancer, an anti-vivisection cancer organization.

Woods died on 15 January 1961.

== Selected publications ==
- The Futility of Animal Experiments (1920)
- Homoeopathic Treatment in the Nursery (1948)
- Essentials of Homoeopathic Prescribing with Rapid Repertory (1949)

== See also ==
- List of homeopaths
