= Vicky Clement-Jones =

Physician and medical researcher

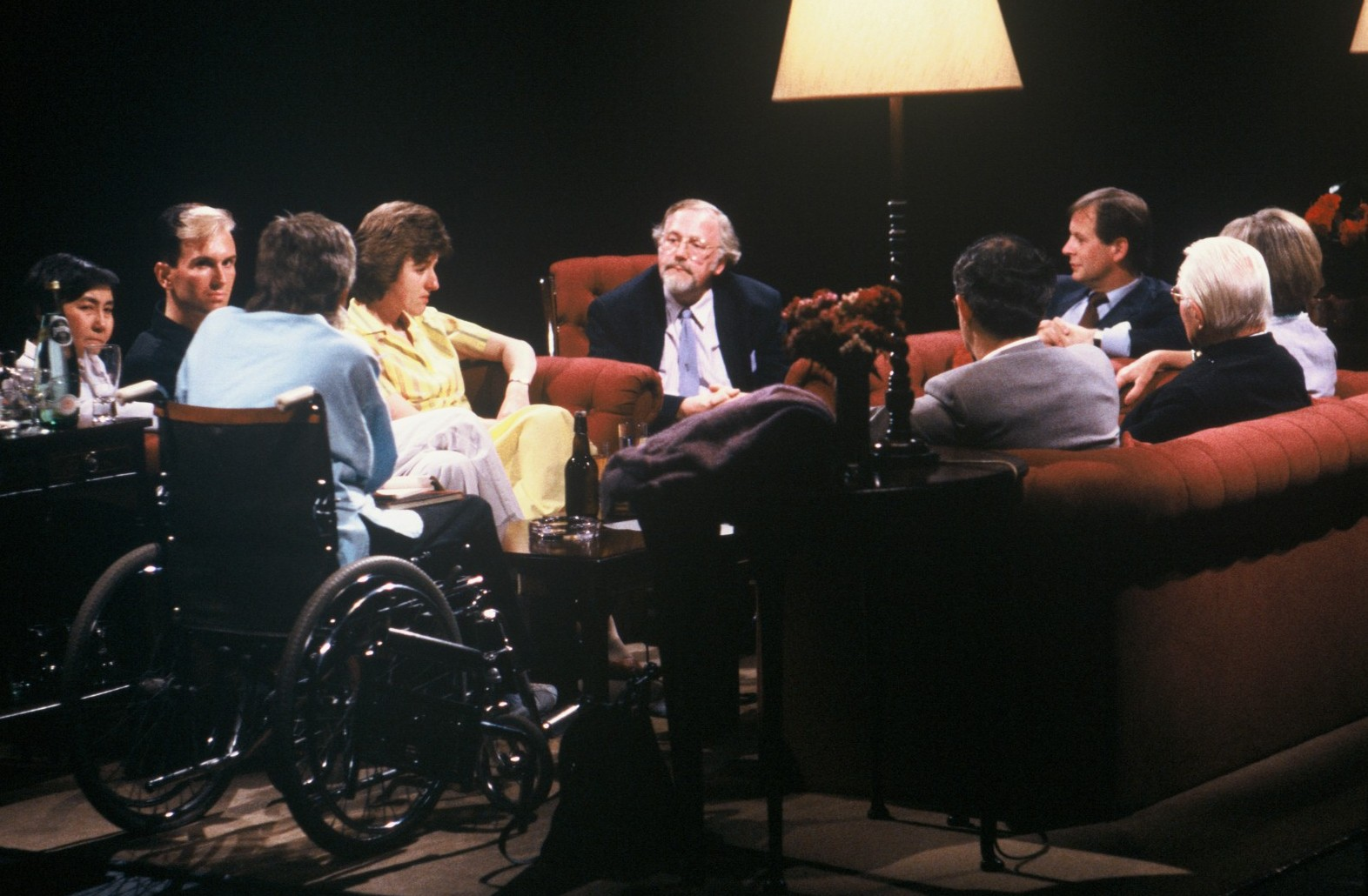
- Appearing on After Dark (far left) in 1987, more here
- Born: Vicky Veronica Yip; 23 December 1948; Hong Kong
- Died: 30 July 1987 (aged 38)
- Occupations: Physician, Medical researcher
- Medical career
- Field: Neurology, Thoracic medicine
- Institutions: St Bartholomew's Hospital
- Research: Opioid peptides

Vicky Veronica Clement-Jones (née Yip; 23 December 1948 – 30 July 1987) was a Hong Kong-born English physician and medical researcher. Her own diagnosis with ovarian cancer led her to found the British Association for Cancer United Patients (BACUP) in 1984.

== Biography ==
Vicky Veronica Yip was born in 1948 in Hong Kong to Teddy Yip, a Chinese businessman, and Susie Ho. In 1957, Yip and her four siblings moved with their mother to East Grinstead, West Sussex. She was educated at the Notre Dame Convent School in Lingfield, Surrey, and East Grinstead County Grammar School. She graduated from Girton College, Cambridge, in 1971 with a first in medical science, archaeology and anthropology, and went on to study medicine at St Thomas's Hospital Medical School.

She married Timothy Clement-Jones in 1973 and graduated from St Thomas's with an MB BCh in 1974. After qualifying, she held house posts at St Thomas's and was eventually promoted to senior house physician in neurology and thoracic medicine. She was appointed a medical registrar at St Bartholomew's Hospital in 1976 and was awarded a bursary to research the opioid peptides involved in responses to pain. After designing a radioimmunoassay for one of these peptides, her findings were published in Nature.

Clement-Jones was diagnosed with ovarian cancer in 1982, at which point she said she "crossed the divide from doctor to patient". This led her to establish the British Association for Cancer United Patients (BACUP), an organisation to provide information, advice and emotional support to cancer patients. BACUP was registered as a charity in 1984 and later became the largest organisation of its kind in the United Kingdom. The name BACUP was changed to CancerBACUP in 1998 and to Cancerbackup in 2006, in an effort to more clearly define what the charity did.

On 26 June 1987 she made an extended appearance on the British television discussion programme After Dark, discussing "Killing With Care?". The following month, on 30 July, Clement-Jones died, aged 38, exactly five years from the day she was diagnosed with ovarian cancer.
