= As-Salam College =

Former Episcopalian missionary school in Cairo, Egypt

- Cairo; Egypt

Information
- Type: Episcopalian missionary school
- Established: 1936

As-Salam College, formerly English Mission College, was an Episcopalian missionary school located in the province of Heliopolis in Cairo, Egypt.

== History ==
The school was established on 24 April 1936, as an English missionary school. It is one of the largest English schools in Heliopolis. It was located in Qubbah Palace on a 5-acre (2.0 ha) property bought for £11,000. The money was donated by friends from England and Egypt. The name of the school was English Mission College and remained as such until 1956 when the British missionaries handed the school to the Episcopal Church of Egypt. In the early days, the school matriculated students primarily from the bourgeoisie class. The British government granted the school £1,500 in 1939 in order to expand the campus.

It is divided into a kindergarten, a preparatory school which is co-educational, and two separate schools for each gender during junior and secondary stages. It has a garden and a large garage for buses.

In 1956, the name was changed to Episcopal Mission College. In 1958, the school name was changed into As-Salam College by the Egyptian Ministry of Education which had taken over all the British and French schools in Egypt.
