= Macmillan Cancer Support =

British charity for people affected by cancer

- Formation: 1911; 115 years ago
- Founder: Douglas Macmillan
- Founded at: Castle Cary, Somerset, United Kingdom
- Type: Charitable organisation
- Headquarters: The Forge, 105 Sumner Street, SE1 9HZ
- Location: London
- Coordinates: 51°30′26.7″N 0°5′36.4″W
- Region served: United Kingdom
- Patron: The King
- Key people: Gemma Peters (CEO); Richard Simcock (Chief Medical Officer); Claire Taylor (Chief Nursing Officer; Karen Watson (Chief Finance & Operations Officer); Steven McIntosh (Chief Partnerships Officer)
- Revenue: £230 million (2023)
- Staff: 1,687 (2022)
- Website: www.macmillan.org.uk
- Formerly called: Society for the Prevention and Relief of Cancer; Cancer Relief Macmillan Fund; Macmillan Cancer Relief

Macmillan Cancer Support is one of the largest British charities and provides specialist health care, information and financial support to people affected by cancer. It also looks at the social, emotional and practical impact cancer can have, and campaigns for better cancer care. Macmillan Cancer Support's goal is to reach and improve the lives of everyone affected by cancer in the UK.

== History ==
The charity was founded 1911 as the Society for the Prevention and Relief of Cancer, by Douglas Macmillan following the death of his father from the disease. In 1924, the name was changed to the National Society for Cancer Relief, which it retained until 1989 when it was changed to Cancer Relief Macmillan Fund, later changed again to Macmillan Cancer Relief. From 5 April 2006, Macmillan Cancer Relief became known as Macmillan Cancer Support, as this more accurately describes its role in supporting people who have cancer. It has adapted the principles of being a "source of support" and a "force for change".

As the National Society for Cancer Relief, the organization provided funding to support the work of the Breast Care and Mastectomy Association of Great Britain, which would later become Breast Cancer Care.

In 2023, Macmillan Cancer Support were listed as the top ranked charity in the United Kingdom in terms of which charities people would be likely to donate to tomorrow, according to YouGov's UK Charity rankings 2023. It is governed by a Board of Trustees and Executive Management Team.

The charity's head office is based in London. Macmillan Cancer Support merged with cancer information charity Cancerbackup in 2008.

Macmillan works in partnership with other cancer research organisations and is a partner of the National Cancer Research Institute. Macmillan is part of the Richmond Group of Charities, which is a coalition of 14 leading health and social care organisations in the voluntary sector.

== Cancer Support ==
Macmillan Cancer Support provides support for people affected by cancer, including local information and support centres, cancer support groups, benefits advisers and cancer support specialists. The charity offers practical, medical, financial and emotional support to those living with and affected by cancer.

In 2024, Macmillan's services reached and supported an estimated 2.4 million people affected by cancer.

=== Virtual support ===
Macmillan provides several forms of virtual support for people affected by cancer, including:

- A free telephone Support Line, offering access to cancer information nurse specialists and money advisers.
- The Macmillan Online Community, where people can share experiences and connect with others in similar situations.
- The Macmillan Buddies service, which matches individuals with trained volunteers for regular emotional support.
- Email-based information and guidance services.

=== In-person support ===
In addition to virtual support, Macmillan Cancer Support offers in-person assistance through:

- Information and Support Centres located across the United Kingdom.
- Macmillan nurses who work in hospitals, hospices and community settings.
- No 7 Boots Macmillan Beauty Advisors, who provide free advice on managing visible side effects of cancer treatment.
- Boots Macmillan Information Pharmacists and Opticians, who can answer questions about medication and treatment-related issues.

== Events ==
Macmillan hosts a series of annual fundraising events, which include running, golf, swimming, and cycling events. The most notable event is the World's Biggest Coffee Morning, which made £16.8 million in 2023, compared to £13.7 million in 2022. Macmillan also hosts other large fundraisers, including Brave the Shave, which raises over £4,000,000 each year, as well as their Mighty Hikes series, which raised £12.3 million in 2023, compared to £11.2 million in 2022.

== See also ==
- Cancer in the United Kingdom
