= Homeopathy UK =

British association of homeopaths

Homeopathy UK previously the British Homeopathic Association (BHA) is a British charity founded in 1902 by John Epps to promote homeopathy and advocate for its training and research. The BHA was re-branded in 2021 to Homeopathy UK. It supports the use of homeopathy within general and specialist healthcare, and provides a listing of homeopathic practitioners. From 1902, the BHA co-sponsored the Missionary School of Medicine, a school of medicine for medical missionaries. The charity also campaigns for more homeopathy in Britain's National Health Service (NHS).

Homeopathy is a form of alternative medicine in which practitioners treat patients using highly diluted preparations based on the Law of Similars of Paracelsus, one of the first documented proponents of modern toxicology".

The BHA has been accused of misrepresenting evidence submitted to the House Of Commons Evidence Check On Homeopathy. Analysis of the evidence submitted by the British Homeopathic Association contains many examples of quote mining, where the conclusions of scientific papers were selectively quoted to make them appear to support the efficacy of homeopathic treatment. For example, one paper's conclusion was reported as "There is some evidence that homeopathic treatments are more effective than placebo" without the immediately following caveat "however, the strength of this evidence is low because of the low methodological quality of the trials. Studies of high methodological quality were more likely to be negative than the lower quality studies."

NHS England's public consultation in July 2017 "to drive out wasteful and ineffective drug prescriptions" resulted in the recommendation, in November 2017, that GPs should stop prescribing homeopathy to patients. The BHA "believed it had identified serious flaws" in the consultation's process and sought a judicial review, crowdfunding donations from supporters to support the legal action. In May 2018, Mr Justice Supperstone heard the case at the Royal Courts of Justice, London and, in June, he upheld NHS England's original decision to cease funding homeopathy. NHS England announced its intention to "reclaim £120,000 in legal costs" from the BHA, arguing "that taxpayers should not pick up the tab for “tap water masquerading as medicine”".

In May 2019, the charity changed its name to Homeopathy UK.

== See also ==
- Faculty of Homeopathy
- Society of Homeopaths
- Homeopathy in the United Kingdom
