= Tunbridge Wells Homeopathic Hospital =

Hospital in England, specialised in homeopathic treatments

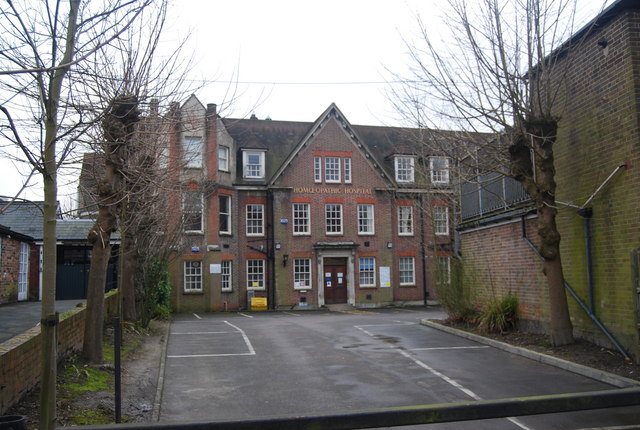
- Tunbridge Wells Homeopathic Hospital

- Shown in Kent

Geography
- Location: Tunbridge Wells, Kent, England, United Kingdom
- Coordinates: 51.1321°N 0.2598°E

Organisation
- Care system: Public NHS
- Type: Specialist

Services
- Speciality: Homeopathic

History
- Founded: 1902
- Closed: 2009

Links
- Lists: Hospitals in England

Tunbridge Wells Homeopathic Hospital was a former NHS hospital in Tunbridge Wells, England, that specialised in homeopathic treatments.

== History ==
The facility was founded by the merger of a group of four homeopathic dispensaries in Bristol into a single premises in Church Road, Tunbridge Wells in 1902. A new wing was added in 1924 and further extensions were added in 1930.

Following a drop in referrals and a review by the West Kent Primary Care Trust of funding for homeopathy, the hospital, then one of four homeopathic hospitals operated by the National Health Service, closed in 2009.
