= NHS Centre for Integrative Care =

Hospital in Gartnavel Hospital Campus, Glasgow, specialising in homeopathic treatments

- NHS Greater Glasgow and Clyde
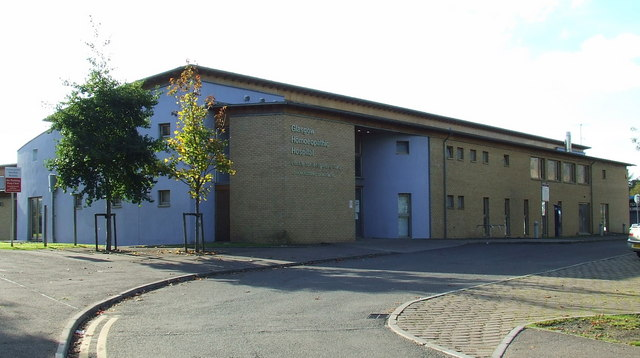
- NHS Centre for Integrative Care

- Shown in Glasgow

Geography
- Location: Gartnavel Hospital Campus, Glasgow
- Coordinates: 55.8807°N 4.3131°W

Organisation
- Care system: NHS Scotland
- Type: Specialist

Services
- Speciality: integrative medicine

Links
- Website: NHS Centre for Integrative Care
- Other links: List of hospitals in Scotland

The NHS Centre for Integrative Care, formerly the Glasgow Homeopathic Hospital, is an NHS treatment centre specialising in holistic treatments, including the use of homeopathy, on the Gartnavel Hospital campus in Glasgow, Scotland. It is managed by NHS Greater Glasgow and Clyde.

== History ==
The hospital has its origins in a small facility located at Berkeley Street which was funded by the Houldsworth family and opened as the Houldsworth Homeopathic Dispensary in March 1909. It moved to 5 Lynedoch Crescent in May 1914 and then to a substantial villa in Great Western Road in 1931 before joining the National Health Service as the Glasgow Homeopathic Hospital in 1948.

It moved to the Gartnavel Hospital campus in 1999 and became the NHS Centre for Integrative Care in 2014.

== Proposed closure ==
There have been prolonged efforts to de-fund homeopathic treatments within the NHS. As of October 2015, NHS Lanarkshire, NHS Highland and NHS Lothian had ceased to make referrals to the centre. NHS Greater Glasgow and Clyde has proposed that the centre may be reassigned to become a new centre for the treatment of chronic pain. Plans to close the unit were put forward by Greater Glasgow and Clyde Health Board in 2017. As of 2018, the Centre for Integrative Care was still operating, with an annual budget of £1.7M.

As of 2021 NHS Greater Glasgow and Clyde continues to mention homeopathic treatments on its website.
