= List of recipients of the St Peter's Medal =

This is a list of recipients of the St Peter's Medal, the highest award of the British Association of Urological Surgeons (BAUS).

== 1949-1959 ==
St Peter's Medal Recipients 1949-1959
Year	Recipient	Comments
1949	James B. Macalpine	Macalpine was the first to be awarded the medal for his series on bladder cancers associated with the dye industry.
1951	Ronald Ogier Ward, Terence J. Millin	
1954	Albert Clifford Morson	
1959	Leslie N. Pyrah	Urologist in Leeds

== 1960-1969 ==
St Peter's Medal Recipients 1960-1969
Year	Recipient	Comments
1960	Cuthbert E. Dukes	
1962	David Band	
1964	Sir Eric Riches	
1965	Arthur Jacobs	
1967	David Innes Williams	
1968	Henry Hamilton Stewart	
1969	John Swinney	

== 1970-1979 ==
St Peter's Medal Recipients 1970-1979
Year	Recipient	Comments
1970	Sir Michael Woodruff	
1971	Dennis S. Poole-Wilson	
1973	David M. Wallace	
1974	Alec Williams Badenoch	
1975	Howard G. Hanley	
1976	John P. Mitchell	
1977	John D. Fergusson	
1978	Richard Turner-Warwick	
1979	Harold H. Hopkins	Physicist.

== 1980-1989 ==
St Peter's Medal Recipients 1980-1989
Year	Recipient	Comments
1980	J. Herbert Johnston	
1981	Roger C. B. Pugh	
1982	John P. Blandy	
1983	W. Keith Yates	
1984	G. F. Murnaghan	
1985	John Wickham	
1986	Norman Gibbon	
1987	Giles Brindley	
1989	Geoffrey Chisholm	

== 1990-1999 ==
St Peter's Medal Recipients 1990-1999
Year	Recipient	Comments
1990	David G. Thomas	
1991	John L. Williams	
1993	Robert E. Williams	
1994	Robert H. Whitaker	
1995	John P. Pryor	
1996	W. Brian Peeling	
1997	Joseph C. Smith	
1998	Philip G. Ransley	
1999	James G. Gow, William F. Hendry	

== 2000-2009 ==
St Peter's Medal Recipients 2000-2009
Year	Recipient	Comments
2000	J. Clive Gingell	
2001	David E. Neal	
2002	Anthony R. Mundy	
2003	Hugh N. Whitfield	
2004	John M. Fitzpatrick	
2005	James Bramble, Roger Kirby	
2006	Alison Brading, Patricia Neville	
2007	Christine Evans, Christopher Woodhouse	
2008	Gordon Williams	
2009	Paul Abrams	

== 2010-2020 ==
St Peter's Medal Recipients 2010-2020
Year	Recipient	Comments
2010	Clare Fowler	
2011	Christopher Chapple	
2012	Freddie Hamdy	
2013	Malcolm Lucas	
2014	Ian Eardley, Timothy B. Hargreave	
2015	Pat Malone	
2016	Margaret Anne Knowles	
2017	Robert Pickard	
2018	Noel Clarke	
2019	Ruaraidh MacDonagh	
2020	Prokar Dasgupta	

== 2021-2026 ==
St Peter's Medal Recipients 2021-2026
Year	Recipient	Comments
2021	Howard Kynaston	
2022	David Ralph	
2023	James N'Dow	
2024	Shamim Khan	
2025	Suks Minhas	
2026	Graham Watson	
