= Peter Freyer =

Irish surgeon

Sir Peter Freyer KCB
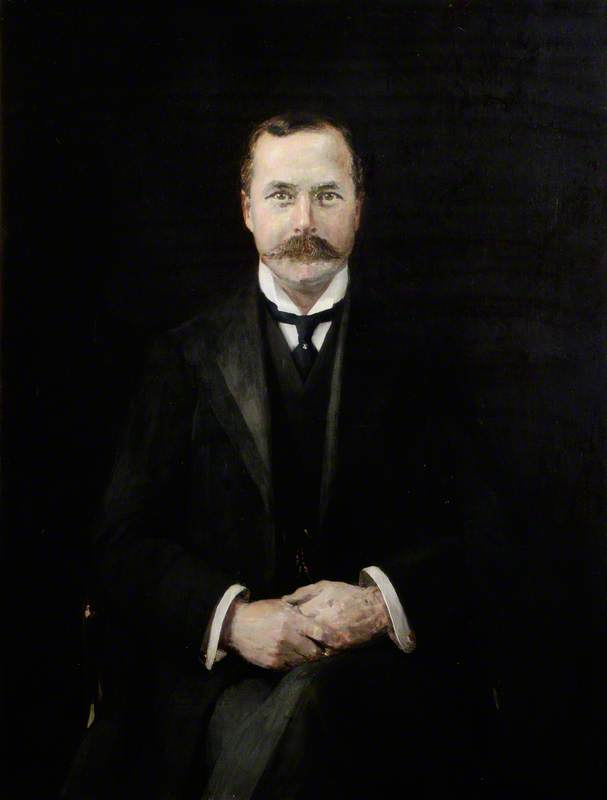
- Sir Peter Freyer by Alice Grant. n.d.
- Born: 2 July 1851; Galway, Ireland
- Died: 9 September 1921 (aged 70); London, England
- Education: Erasmus Smith's College, Galway; Queen's College; Dr Steevens' Hospital
- Occupation: Urologist
- Known for: Operations on bladder stones; Suprapubic prostatectomy for benign large prostates; First president of the section of urology of the Royal Society of Medicine
- Medical career
- Profession: Surgeon
- Institutions: Prince of Wales Hospital (Benares); St Peter's Hospital for stone; Queen Alexandra Military Hospital; King Edward VII's Hospital
- Sub-specialties: Urology
- Research: Prostate surgery

Sir Peter Freyer KCB (2 July 1851 – 9 September 1921) was an Irish surgeon with an expertise in genitourinary surgery, best known at first as an Indian Medical Service (IMS) officer, for making popular the procedure for crushing bladder stones to allow them to be evacuated through the natural passages, a procedure known as a litholapaxy. Following retirement from the IMS after 20 years of service in India, he returned to England and popularized a procedure for benign large prostates. This was known as the suprapubic prostatectomy, a transvesical prostatectomy or the Freyer operation, where the prostate is removed through an abdominal incision above the pubic bone but below the umbilicus and through the bladder, and it included using suprapubic drainage post-operatively.

He entered the Bengal Medical Service as a surgeon in 1875 and served almost exclusively in civil employment in the North-Western Provinces and Oudh in the United Provinces of India. While based at Moradabad in 1888, he successfully operated on Muhammad Mushtaq Ali Khan, the Nawab of Rampur, crushing his bladder stone with a lithotrite. Freyer defended the remuneration he received from the Nawab, which had caused a controversy with the British establishment in India at the time. This and an eye injury caused while serving the civil surgeoncy of Benares contributed to Freyer taking early retirement and returning to England in 1896.

In England he set up a private practice in Harley Street and was appointed a consulting surgeon in the surgery of the urinary organs at St Peter's Hospital for stone, London. He first performed the procedure of suprapubic prostatectomy in 1900, on a man who then survived 12 years. Although Freyer was not the first to introduce this operation, despite his claim otherwise causing the second significant controversy in his career, he is credited with popularising it. In 1920, he was elected the first president of the section of urology of the Royal Society of Medicine and in his presidential address, claimed to have performed 1,674 of these operations with a low mortality.

The Department of Surgery, NUI Galway, hosts the annual Sir Peter Freyer Memorial Lecture and Surgical Symposium in his honour, and the James Hardiman Library at the NUI hold around 660 items of his memorabilia.

== Early life and education ==
Peter Johnson Freyer, named after his paternal grandfather who was a chief officer in the Irish Coast Guard, was born in County Galway on 2 July 1851, the eldest child of landholder Samuel Freyer and his wife Celia Burke, who was a Roman Catholic. Freyer and his siblings however, were brought up as Protestant, a likely effect of the influence of the Irish Church Missionss (ICM) on the people in the area at that time. On 26 July of that year, he was baptised in Ballinakill's parish church. In 1855, his father, who was a tenant of the ICM supporter Sir Christopher Lighton, had in possession 17 acres of land at Moorneen and property and land in Knockbrack, both of which are located in Clifden. Twenty one years later, in 1876, when a list of those owning more than one acre was compiled, he was recorded as owning 210 acres.

Freyer was educated at Erasmus Smith's College, Galway, and won a scholarship to attend Queen's College (now NUI Galway). He graduated in 1872 with a gold medal and a first class honors degree in arts. Two years later, in 1874, he earned his MD and M.Ch. having won another gold medal. While a medical student he also spent some time as a resident pupil at Dr Steevens' Hospital in Dublin. Following a short time working in Paris, he returned to sit the competitive examination of the Indian Medical Service.

== Indian Medical Service ==
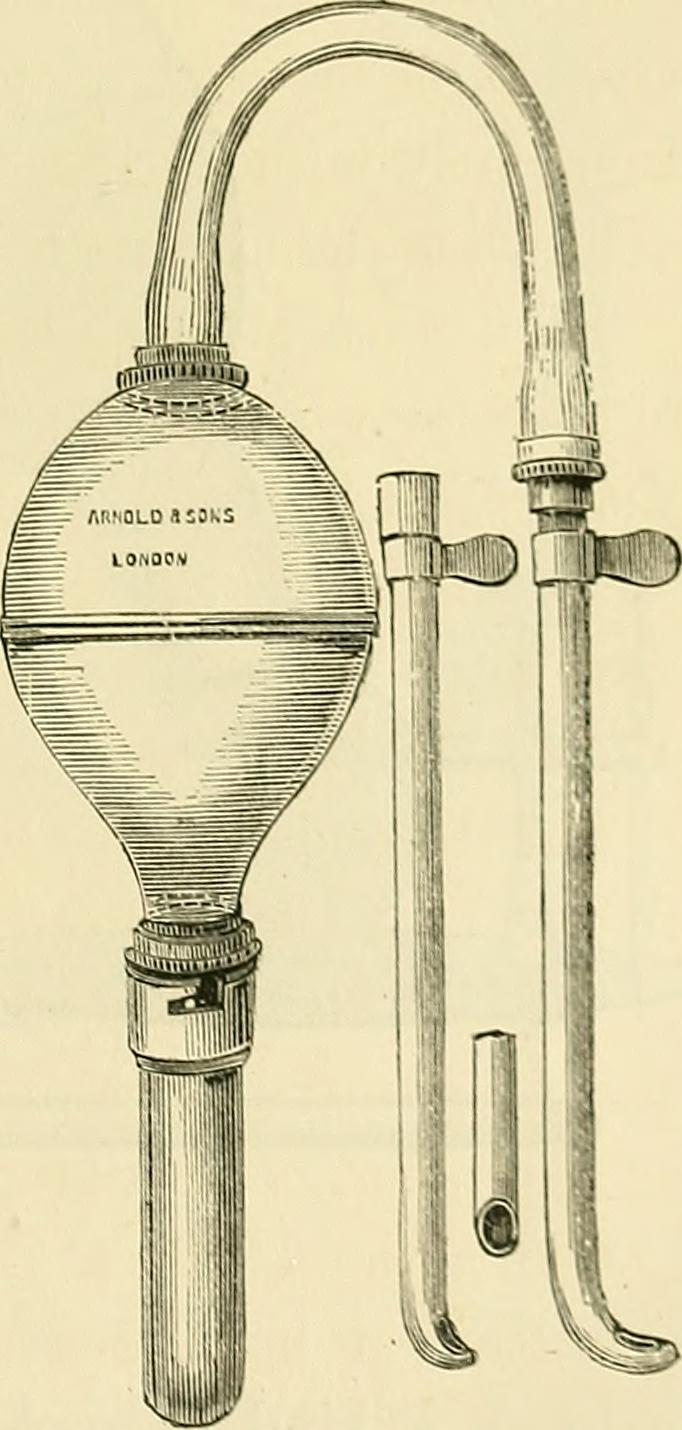
The treatment of stone in the bladder by litholapaxy

=== Admission to the Bengal Medical Service ===
Freyer came first in the competitive examination for a commission as a medical officer in the Bengal Medical Service, which later became part of the IMS. Entering the service as a surgeon on 30 September 1875, he became a civil surgeon in Azamgarh in April 1877. He started publishing his medical articles in The Indian Medical Gazette in 1878. Subsequently, he became a surgeon-major and surgeon lieutenant-colonel after 12 and 20 years' service respectively and retired from service on 3 May 1896. He served almost exclusively in civil employment in the North-Western Provinces and Oudh in the United Provinces of India, where he then held the civil surgeoncies successively of Moradabad, Bareilly, Allahabad, Mussoorie and Benares, and was also for a short time surgeon on the staff of the Lieutenant-Governor.

=== The controversy in India ===
During his time in India, he became reputable in cataract surgery and the operation of removing bladder stones, litholapaxy. In 1888, while based at Moradabad, Freyer operated on the Nawab of Rampur, Muhammad Mushtaq Ali Khan, crushing his bladder stone with a lithotrite. In return for his services, the Nawab gave Freyer a lakh (100,000) of rupees, equivalent to £10,000, or £598,900 at the time. He also treated General Azim Uddin Khan, the Nawab's chief administrator. This remuneration caused conflict between Freyer and his superiors in the Indian Government of the time, the British administrative authority in India. Freyer had been attending to the Nawab for over 16 months, providing regular treatment including the operation. The government of India raised objections to the receipt by a medical officer of so large a sum of money, and first ordered him to return the money to the Nawab, and later either to do so or to retire from the service. Arguing that there were no grounds in any regulation of the time, he refused to either return the fees or to resign. He was of the opinion that he had earned the money and in doing so had broken no role of the service, but had only done what he was entitled to do. In the end, his view of the case prevailed. The grant and receipt of this large fee, however, was what gave rise to the rules and regulations regarding acceptance of fees from Indian chiefs and gentlemen of high position, which although were later amended on fairly reasonable terms, proved unpopular with IMS officers who in turn put the blame on Freyer.

=== Later years in India ===
In 1894, Freyer represented the Indian government at the International Medical and Surgical Congress in Rome, where he presented his study on 598 cases of bladder stone removal by transurethral lithopaxy, using the same technique as Henry Jacob Bigelow. At the time, the mortality for open lithotomy was 12.5%, but Freyer demonstrated a 1.84% mortality.

Following a promotion to the civil surgeoncy of Benares, he became surgeon to the Prince of Wales Hospital in Benares, later renamed the Shiv Prasad Gupta Hospital. His troubles with his superiors in India and an eye injury from an assault by a patient at the Benares asylum contributed to Freyer taking early retirement in 1896 and he returned to England. He had served in the IMS for more than 20 years.

== Career in London ==
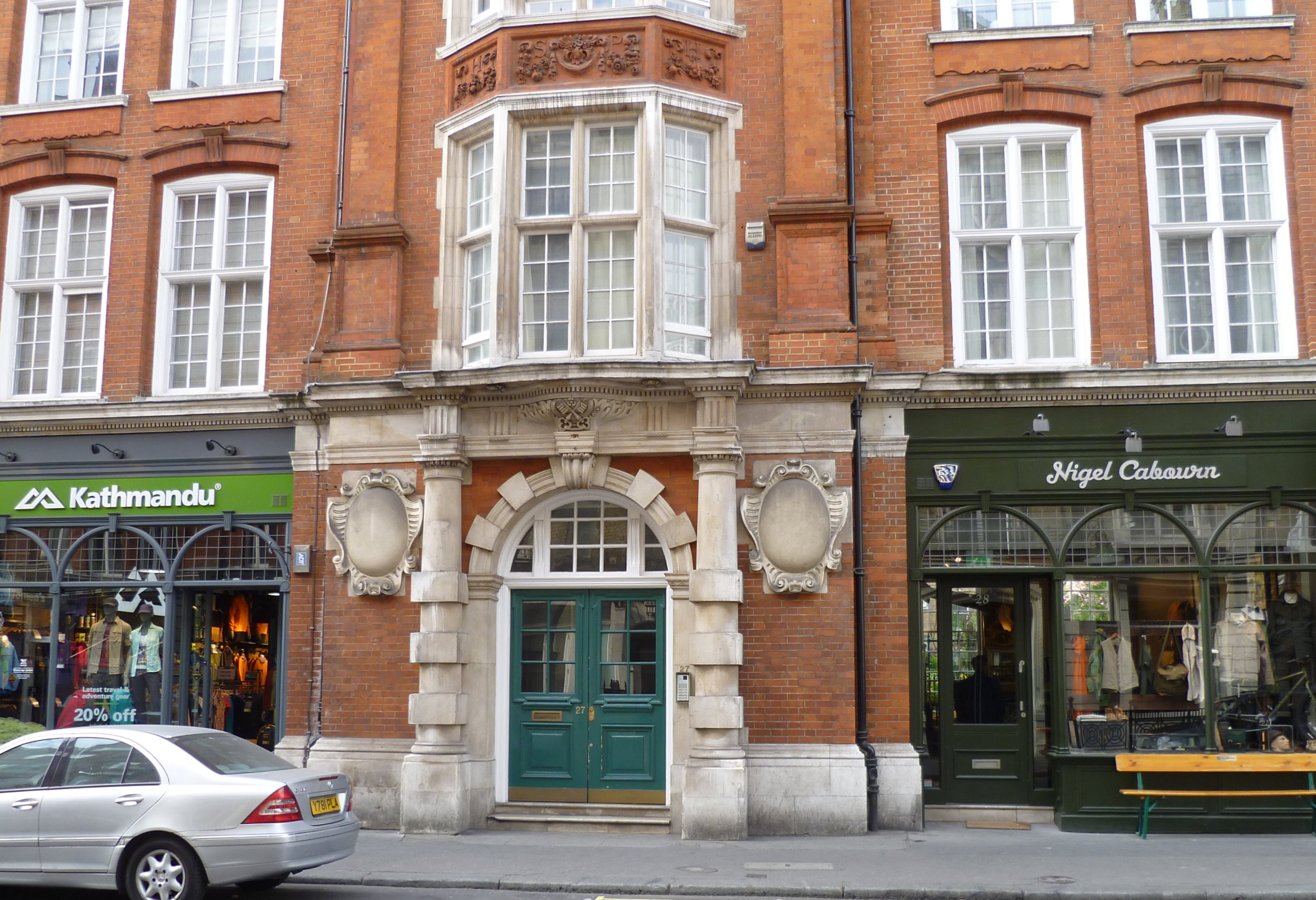
Former buildings of St. Peter's Hospital

In 1897, Freyer was appointed a consulting surgeon in the surgery of the urinary organs at St Peter's Hospital for stone, London, at a time when it was customary for young surgeons to tour French and English surgical centres. In August 1900, on route to Paris from New York, Ramon Guiteras made a stopover in London. Guiteras presented his suprapubic prostatectomy, which he modified from Eugene Fuller's version and then wrote to Fuller that "Dr. Freyer was very much pleased with the description of the operations, and said that he would try the method". The following year, in 1901 in the British Medical Journal, Freyer published his first four cases of suprapubic prostatectomy. He became an immediate success and was referred to by Lord Moynihan as a "Pee Free-er". Freyer performed before international audiences, running his own commentary and even speaking Hindi and French with some visiting surgeons. His claims of introducing the surgery without credit to Fuller led Fuller to later state that "if he wishes to claim to be the original scratcher in connection with suprapubic prostatectomy, I certainly will not protest against that his only valid claim."

In 1905, Astley Paston Cooper Ashhurst, with an introductory letter from Richard Harte, stopped over in London to observe Freyer. He described Freyer in a letter to his brother, as a "brusque, blunt, rather aggressive man in manner...He seems to have rather a high opinion of himself and I certainly thought him a skilful operator". He continued in his letter that Freyer "showed me his large collection of prostates, over a hundred in all" and pointed out a number from notable men including one from Lord Kelvin.

William Belfield, Arthur McGill and Eugene Fuller had all performed, for benign large prostates, the operation of removing the prostate through an incision made above the pubic bone but below the umbilicus and through the bladder. However it remained unpopular. Although Freyer was not the first to introduce this procedure, he is credited with popularising it, particularly following his report in 1920, presented at the RSM, on the low mortality of 1,674 cases of suprapubic prostatectomies, utilising suprapubic drainage post-operatively. He stated;

On December 1, 1900, I performed for the first time my operation of total enucleation of the prostate, and in July, 1901, published in the British Medical Journal, for the consideration of the profession at large, a lecture delivered by me at the Medical Graduates' College, giving a full description. of the operation, with details of four successful cases. I have now completed 1,674 cases of the operation, details of 1,550 of which have been recorded in the numerous papers published in the medical journals. I believe I may say that this operation is now almost universally practised by surgeons.

Morson, however, later stated that Freyer performed a total of 1,337 prostatectomies. The number of articles and lectures Freyer gave, in addition to the publicity surrounding the controversies regarding his claims that he had introduced the operation, likely helped make the procedure widely known. In addition to the scandal in India caused by receiving fees from the Nawab, being accepted into the London's medical circles was not likely helped by being Irish.

A. Clifford Morson had later noted that Freyer was just one of two surgeons appointed without a FRCS. He also recounted a story where a general practitioner referred to Freyer as a "quack". However, the operation had a lower mortality in Freyer's hands compared to others, at a time before antibiotics and with only basic anaesthesia. Freyer's skill lay in his speed.

John Thomson-Walker, first honorary secretary of the section of urology at the RSM, later described Freyer's surgery as "decided, purposive and rapid, and in some operations, especially that of litholapaxy, the manipulation was graceful".

When Cuthbert Dukes became president of the urology section of the RSM in 1956, he disclosed that when he took up the appointment of pathologist at St Peters 26 years previously, he had come to be in possession of the medical notes and pathological specimen of the prostate removed from Freyer's first transvesical prostatectomy case of John Thomas in 1900. Thomas survived 12 years, and wrote to Freyer in 1912 "I must say I am perfectly right in my urinary organs and for which I shall never be able to thank you enough". The procedure was later superseded by the retropubic prostatectomy popularised by Terence Millin following his publication of the technique in 1945.

=== Other roles ===
In 1902, he became examiner in surgery at the University of Durham and from 1904 to 1909 he was a member of the honorary medical staff of King Edward VII's Hospital for Officers. Thereafter he was appointed a consulting surgeon to the Queen Alexandra Military Hospital, Millbank, London. In 1904, he was awarded the Arnott Memorial Medal for original surgical work.

== First World War ==
When the First World War began in 1914, Freyer rejoined for service as consulting surgeon to Queen Alexandria's military hospital, to be Indian hospitals in England, and to the eastern command in general.

He received the CB on 1 January 1917 and the KCB six months later on 4 June 1917.

Between 10 April 1918 and 10 April 1919, he held a temporary colonelcy in the Royal Army Medical Corps and upon resignation of post was promoted to an honorary full colonelcy on the retired list.

In October 1919, he received an honorary doctorate from the National University of Ireland.

== Later career ==
After the war and with a greater recognition of urology as a specialty, Freyer at the age of 69, was elected the first president of the section of urology of the RSM in 1920, when the RSM's president was Sir Humphry Rolleston.

His presidential address covered the achievements in urology over the previous 45 years and he hoped the section would result in a co-ordination of work in the field of urology. Freyer was succeeded the following year by Lord Horder, and the section continued with meetings and with its annual president's address.

== Personal and family ==
Freyer married Isabelle McVittie, daughter of Robert McVittie of Dublin, and they had one son, Dermot Johnston and one daughter, Kathleen Mary. In 1914, Isabelle died.

Freyer was seen to be a "staunch Home Ruler", and the papers held at the NUI, Galway, provide evidence that he was friends with the Redmond brothers, William and John, who he operated on in March 1918. John subsequently died post-operatively. He was also friends with T P O'Connor, an Irish Nationalist member of Parliament.

== Death and legacy ==
Freyer died from a cerebral haemorrhage at 27 Harley St., London, on 9 September 1921, aged 70 years. He was buried beside his father in the Church of Ireland cemetery at Clifden, County Galway.

A portrait of Freyer, painted by Alice Grant in 1919, hangs in the boardroom of St Peter's Hospital for Stone.

Harold Ellis later recalled that Freyer's procedure remained popular for some time, recounting that in 1948, as a house surgeon, he assisted in many of these.

Every year, the Sir Peter Freyer Memorial Lecture and Surgical Symposium, established in 1975 by professor O'Beirn, is hosted by the Department of Surgery, NUI Galway. Past lecturers have included Peter Froggatt in 1984, Thomas E. Starzl in 1985, Mutsuo Sugiura in 1986, Thomas J. Fogarty in 1987, Bernard Fisher (scientist) in 1988, Norman Stanley Williams in 1989, Geoffrey Duncan Chisholm in 1991, Patrick J. Kelly in 2001, Ara Darzi in 2002, Steven D. Wexner in 2004, Peter T. Scardino in 2006 and Patrick Gullane in 2009.

A detailed account of Freyer is given in C. P. MacLoughlin's "From Sellerna to Harley Street".

In 1980, the Department of Surgery at NUI Galway acquired Freyer's personal papers and memorabilia from his grandsons. Subsequently, in 2002, the James Hardiman Library at the NUI acquired them and now hold around 660 items consisting of his letters, newspaper cuttings, official records, photographs, memorabilia and publications. Other items have also been added.

The Freyer Unit in Galway Clinic is named in his honour.

== Selected publications ==
=== Articles ===
- Freyer, PJ (1886). "On the Instruments Required in the Operation of Litholapaxy". Ind Med Gaz. 21: 1–7. PMC 5000880. PMID 28999493.
- Freyer, PJ (1900). "The Symptoms of Stone in the Kidney". Ind Med Gaz. 35: 14–15. PMC 5152238. PMID 29003274.
- Freyer, PJ (1901). "A Clinical Lecture on Total Extirpation of the Prostate for Radical Cure of Enlargement of that Organ: With Four Successful Cases: Delivered at the Medical Graduates' College, London, June 26th". Br Med J. 2 (2116): 125–9. doi:10.1136/bmj.2.2116.125. PMC 2505938. PMID 20759747.
- Freyer, PJ (1919). "Total Enucleation of the Prostate: A Further Series of 550 Cases of the Operation". British Medical Journal. 1 (3031): 121–120.2. doi:10.1136/bmj.1.3031.121. PMC 2340709. PMID 20769349.
- Freyer, P (1921). "President's Address: Modern Progress in Urinary Surgery". Proc R Soc Med. 14 (Sect Urol): 1–11. doi:10.1177/003591572101402001. PMC 2152618. PMID 19982053.

=== Books ===
- Clinical Lectures on the Surgical Diseases of the Urinary Organs. William Wood & Company, New York (1909).
