= Margaret Anne Knowles =

Professor of cancer research

Margaret Anne Knowles is professor of cancer research at Leeds Institute of Medical Research at St James's, where she has led research on bladder cancer. In 2016 she was awarded the St Peter's Medal of the British Association of Urological Surgeons.

== See also ==
- List of recipients of the St Peter's Medal
