= Leslie Norman Pyrah =

British urologist

Leslie Norman Pyrah (11 April 1899 - 30 April 1995), was a British urologist in Leeds, who played a leading role in setting up urology as a specialty in the UK. In 1959 he was awarded the St Peter's Medal of the British Association of Urological Surgeons. He became president of the section of urology at the Royal Society of Medicine.

== See also ==
- List of recipients of the St Peter's Medal
