= Casualty 1900s =

British hospital drama spin-off miniseries

- Casualty 1906 title sequence
- Also known as: Casualty 1906
- Genre: Medical drama
- Country of origin: United Kingdom
- No. of episodes: 1

Production
- Running time: 60 minutes

Original release
- Network: BBC One
- Release: 3 December 2006

Related
- Casualty 1907

Casualty 1900s
- Also known as: Casualty 1907
- Genre: Medical drama
- Country of origin: United Kingdom
- No. of episodes: 3

Production
- Running time: 60 minutes

Original release
- Network: BBC One
- Release: 30 March – 17 April 2008

Related
- Casualty 1906 (Pilot); Casualty 1909

Casualty 1900s
- Also known as: Casualty 1909
- Genre: Medical drama
- Directed by: Bryn Higgins (eps 1–3); Mark Brozel (eps 4–6)
- Country of origin: United Kingdom
- No. of episodes: 6

Production
- Producer: Bryn Higgins
- Running time: 58 Minutes
- Production company: Stone City Films

Original release
- Network: BBC One; BBC HD
- Release: 14 June – 19 July 2009

Related
- Casualty 1907

Casualty 1900s, broadcast in the US as London Hospital, is a British hospital drama inspired by but otherwise unrelated to BBC One drama Casualty.

It places the viewer in the Receiving Room of the London Hospital, in London's East End. The drama is shot with the pace and action of its modern-day counterpart A&E. Every case and character is based on real cases, characters and events taken from the hospital records, nurses' ward diaries, and memoirs.

It began with a single episode of Casualty 1906, followed by three episodes of Casualty 1907, and six episodes of Casualty 1909.

== Episodes ==
=== Casualty 1907 ===
==== Episode 1 ====
Nurse Ada Russell has to decide whether or not to take the job of Ward Sister of Wellington ward, as it threatens to spoil her engagement to Dr James Walton. The hospital is using a radical new technique, ultra-violet light, to treat skin disease caused by unsanitary living conditions in the East End. Queen Alexandra visits with her sister the dowager empress of Russia to see the hospital.

==== Episode 2 ====
Probationer Ethel Bennett goes through a night of rising tension as she nurses Thomas Hooley, the injured docker whose leg wounds are not healing. She clashes with ward sister Ada Russell, who is overwhelmed by the strain of running of a large, busy ward and worried about her true feelings for her fiancé. Nobby Clark, leader of the violent Blind Beggar Gang, is hospitalised with alcoholic cirrhosis of the liver, aged just 15. Driven mad by cravings and nightmares, his path crosses with Ada with unexpected results.

==== Episode 3 ====
With the hospital facing imminent financial collapse, chairman Sydney Holland launches an inspired campaign to raise money. The cost of building the modern city is revealed when workers on the new Rotherhithe Tunnel are admitted with agonising diver's bends. Ethel, working in the receiving room, contracts scarlet fever from a patient.

=== Casualty 1909 ===
==== Episode 1 ====
Revolution grips the East End as an explosion brings fears of a bomb, and Ethel Bennett and Dr Millais Culpin struggle to control the angry victims. When detectives arrive, Matron Luckes and Chairman Sydney Holland fear the hospital is in danger of becoming an extension of Scotland Yard. Meanwhile, Sister Ada Russell battles with irascible star surgeon Mr Henry Dean, whose addiction to cocaine is an open secret. And ambitious young Dr Ingrams faces catastrophe in the operating theatre.

==== Episode 2 ====
A scandal brews as Nurse Goodley suspects that Mr Dean is ignoring the terrible side-effects of a new anaesthetic, and battles internally as whether she should risk everything and turn whistleblower. Sister Ada Russell copes with her first day in reception following reassignment. Nurse Bennett fears that her secret alliance with Dr Culpin has been discovered when Matron Luckes sends her into private nursing.

==== Episode 3 ====
The strain of being 'married to the hospital' takes its toll on Sister Ada Russell, as she nears collapse. On one of the London's Jewish wards, Nurse Goodley finds herself increasingly drawn to the charismatic radical Saul Landau – but Saul has a life-threatening illness.

==== Episode 4 ====
Sister Russell discovers the secret of probationer Nellie Bowers when she catches her sneaking out to see a mysterious young man. The London admits a woman brought in wearing pauper's clothes yet with silk underwear underneath. Meanwhile, the brilliant pioneer Dr Henry Head commits to performing a dangerous experiment on himself.

==== Episode 5 ====
Dr Culpin is powerless to help when Ethel Bennett rushes to her dying brother in a naval hospital. Star surgeon Mr Dean faces destruction through his cocaine addiction. Sister Russell breaks the strict rules of Matron Luckes when she sneaks out of the London to help a young mother.

==== Episode 6 ====
All the secrets burst open, as Matron Luckes clashes with Sister Russell for leaving the London to help a family in the slums, while Dr Culpin clashes with Bennett for giving up studying to be a doctor. Mr Dean, supposedly clean, returns to work in the Operating Theatre. In the dead of night a sweatshop catches fire, bringing in scores of injured children, and the staff struggle to avert tragedy.

== Medicine as portrayed in Casualty 1900s ==
Casualty 1900s portrays the use of early anesthesia, predominately chloroform and ether, the first standardised use of spinal anesthesia, and the growing need for trained anesthetists. No electronic equipment means doctors have to physically check a patient's pulse during surgery. CPR is largely based on the Silvester Method in which a patient's arms are raised above their head and then back down in an effort to stimulate muscles.

With penicillin still undiscovered, infections such as Erysipelas are largely incurable. Emphasis is placed on keeping wards and operating theatres clean.

The effectiveness of the anti-streptococcus serum that cures Ethel's scarlet fever was reported in the Journal of the American Medical Association in 1897.

The hospital is shown to have an X-ray room complete with X-ray machine. At the time protection against radiation emitted from such a machine was inadequate, little more than a thick pair of gloves was standard. Ernest Wilson, portrayed by Jason Watkins, was one of Britain's first radiologists and is shown with burns to both hands due to the unsafe levels with which he must work.

Nurse Bennett's dream of becoming a doctor meant facing a challenge, but not an impossibility. Elizabeth Garrett Anderson, the first woman in Great Britain to graduate from medical school, began to practice in 1865. The London School of Medicine for Women was founded in 1874.

== Broadcast ==
Casualty 1907 was broadcast on BBC One. After the initial broadcast of each episode, they were repeated four days afterwards but only in certain areas.

Episode	Channel	Broadcast date	Viewer avg.	Share	Refs
One	BBC One	30 March 2008	6.7 million	27%	
Two	BBC One	6 April 2008	5.3 million	22%	
Three	BBC One	13 April 2008	3.5 million	14%	

Casualty 1909 was broadcast on Sunday nights through June and July 2009 at 9pm on BBC One and – a first for the Casualty 1900s series – BBC HD. Episodes were repeated on BBC Four a couple of months after their original broadcast. February 2011 saw the series broadcast on BBC Entertainment in Europe, South Africa, U.A.E & Israel as London Hospital.

Episode	Broadcast date	Channels	Viewer avg.	Share	Refs
One	14 June 2009	BBC One & BBC HD	3.5 million	16%	
Two	21 June 2009	BBC One & BBC HD	3.1 million	13%	
Three	28 June 2009	BBC One & BBC HD	3.1 million	13%	
Four	5 July 2009	BBC One & BBC HD	3.3 million	14%	
Five	12 July 2009	BBC One & BBC HD	2.9 million	12%	
Six	19 July 2009	BBC One & BBC HD	3.3 million	15%	

== DVD release ==
The complete Casualty 1900s series has been released on Region 2 DVD in the UK. The DVD comprises Casualty 1906, Casualty 1907 and Casualty 1909.

== Cast ==
=== Casualty 1906 ===
- Tim Baker as Begging Boy
- Paul Brightwell as Mr Hills
- Nigel Cooke as Dr Burgess
- Dorothy Duffy as Nurse Rafferty
- Bella Emberg as Mrs Hard Up
- Nicholas Farrell as Sydney Holland
- Ronnie Fox as Policeman
- Fiona Gillies as Minnie Piatkov
- Colin Heber-Percy as Gould
- Rebecca Johnson as Sister Spencer
- Hattie Ladbury as Miss Kenneally
- Elliot Levey as Abe Goldman
- Cherie Lunghi as Matron Eva Luckes
- John Maude as Sailor
- Tamzin Merchant as Probationer Eastwood
- Cathy Murphy as Mrs Sarah Hills
- Connor Quilty as Teddy
- Tom Riley as Dr James Walton
- Sarah Smart as Nurse Ada Russell
- Hywel Simons as Dr Lawes
- David Troughton as Hurry Fenwick
- Katie Ventress as Nurse Mary Green
- Jason Watkins as Ernest Wilson
- Lyall B. Watson as Hard Up
- Antonia Willans as Polly
- Mike Lockley as Doctor
- Adam Sarath as Patient
- Jasmine Lundon as Singing Patient
- Joshua Lundon as Singing Patient

=== Casualty 1907 ===
- Alfie Allen as Nobby Clark
- Leah Bracknell as Mrs Turner
- Nicholas Farrell as Sydney Holland
- Neil Fitzmaurice as Thomas Hooley
- William Houston as Dr Millais Culpin
- Dominic Jephcott as Bedford Fenwick
- Lilli Ella Kelleher as Dora
- Lydia Leonard as Laura Goodley
- Mike Lockley as Doctor
- Cherie Lunghi as Matron Eva Luckes
- Jessica Mullins as Maud
- Youkti Patel as Corisande Veveers
- Tom Riley as Dr James Walton
- Lewis Robinson as Reggie
- Hywel Simons as Dr Lawes
- Sarah Smart as Ada Russell
- Adam Sopp as Frank Gorman
- David Troughton as Mr Hurry Fenwick
- Charity Wakefield as Ethel Bennet

=== Casualty 1909 ===
==== Main characters ====
- Cherie Lunghi as Matron Eva Luckes
- Sarah Smart as Sister Ada Russell
- Will Houston as Dr Millais Culpin
- Nicholas Farrell as Chairman Sydney Holland
- Charity Wakefield as Nurse Ethel Bennet
- David Troughton as Hurry Fenwick
- Paul Hilton as Henry Percy Dean
- Lydia Leonard as Nurse Laura Goodley
- Tom Hughes as Dr Harry Ingrams
- Anton Lesser as Dr Henry Head
- Tessa Parr as Nellie Bowers
- Andrew Readman as Ernest Morris
- Jo Hartley as Anna
- Rebecca Johnson as Sister Spencer
- Aidan McArdle as Saul Landau
- Imogen Bain as Mrs Anderson
- Eleanor Bron as Miss De Burgh

==== Supporting characters ====
- Kenneth Colley as Frederick Smith
- Dorothy Atkinson as Nurse Granger
- Eamon Geoghegan as Hospital Steward
- Aimee-Ffion Edwards as Deborah Lynch
- Kate Fleetwood as Grace Barnes
- Clare Higgins as Mrs Ramsbury
- Amy Stratton as Mrs Tabard
- Jon Lolis as Stepanovs
- John Davies as Uncle Mick
- Grace Cassidy as Teenage Girl
- David de Keyser as Mr Fischoff
- Caroline Harding as Edith Dean
- Lisa Brookes as Nurse Ansett
- Jennie Stoller as Mrs Gold
- Tim Woodward as DSI Hatton
- Christopher Wright as Mr Knopf
- Colin Tierney as Prescott
