= Arthur McGill =

Arthur McGill may refer to:

- Arthur C. McGill (1926–1980), American theologian and philosopher
- Arthur Fergusson McGill (1846–1890), British surgeon, anatomist and author
- Arthur McGill (rugby union) (born 1944), Australian rugby union player
