= Bernard Joseph Ward =

British urologist (1879–1950)

Bernard Joseph Ward (19 March 1879 – 30 July 1950), was a British urologist, who contributed to the Société Internationale d'Urologie, was president of the section of urology at the Royal Society of Medicine, and vice-president of the British Association of Urological Surgeons (BAUS), to which he presented the St Peter's Medal die.
