= David Innes Williams =

British paediatric urologist

David Innes Williams FRCP
- David Williams in 2013
- Born: 12 June 1919; London
- Died: 3 May 2013 (aged 93)
- Occupation: Surgeon
- Medical career
- Profession: Paediatric Urologist
- Awards: St Peter's Medal (1967)

Sir David Innes Williams (12 June 1919 – 3 May 2013) was a British paediatric urologist.

== Early life and education ==
Williams was born in London on 12 June 1919 and educated at Sherborne School and Trinity Hall, Cambridge. He served in the Royal Army Medical Corps from 1945 until 1948, during which time he was appointed Surgical Specialist.

After leaving the Army Williams became a resident at St Peter's Hospital for Stone, a London hospital for the treatment of bladder stones and other urological complaints.

== Contribution to medical field ==
Williams is widely regarded as the founder of the modern medical field of paediatric urology. In 1948, Williams was a resident in Urology at St Peter's. A boy was brought to the hospital who was suffering from urinary retention. Williams was shocked to know that not even senior staff in the hospital had any knowledge on how to treat the child.

Williams also came to know that there was no literature in the field. Deciding that the field needed to be studied more, he began collaboration for a book with Twistington Higgins, a general surgeon interested in urology. Williams, Higgins, and DF Ellison Nash co-wrote The Urology of Childhood, which was published in 1951 and the book became a milestone in the development of child urology.

The Urology of Childhood started a productive phase in Williams' writing life. The next few decades Williams wrote and added to the existent literature. He also enlarged and worked on the previous research, thereby strengthening the field. He wrote and published several papers based on his own surgical observations. He also worked tirelessly to establish a small body of fellow specialists.

One of his first initiatives on being appointed in 1952 to the new position of senior genito-urinary surgeon at the Great Ormond Street Hospital was to found the Society for Paediatric Urologists. He achieved this aim in 1963, an organization that today has members around the world.

== Awards and honors ==
The contributions and improvements Williams made in the field of genito-urinary conditions, especially in finding new treatments for children, led to many regarding him the founder of paediatric urology clinically, academically and educationally. It was achievements such as these that led to a knighthood in 1985. Some of the prestigious posts he held throughout his career are Pro-Vice-Chancellor of the University of London (1985–87), Chairman of Council, Imperial Cancer Research Fund (1982–91), President of the British Medical Association (1988–89), and President of the Royal Society of Medicine (1990–92).

In 1967 he was awarded the St Peter's Medal by the British Association of Urological Surgeons (BAUS).
