= Albert Clifford Morson =

British surgeon

Albert Clifford Morson OBE
- Occupation: Urologist
- Medical career
- Institutions: St Peter's Hospital for stone
- Awards: St Peter's Medal (1954)

Albert Clifford Morson OBE, (1881 - 5 January 1975), was a surgeon who pioneered radiotherapy treatments for urinary tract cancers. After the First World War, he was appointed assistant surgeon to St Peter's Hospital for stone, with Peter Freyer, and became consultant in 1923. In 1933, he was elected president of the Section of Urology of the Royal Society of Medicine and, in 1947, he became president of the British Association of Urological Surgeons (BAUS).

In 1954 he was awarded the BAUS's St Peter's Medal.

== Selected publications ==
- St. Peter's Hospital for Stone, 1860-1960. Edinburgh & London, 1960
- "Sir Peter Freyer and Sir John Thomson Walker". Editorial in the Postgraduate Medical Journal. 1 August 1949, pp. 353–358.
