= James Barlow Macalpine =

British genitourinary surgeon

James Barlow Macalpine (11 February 1882 – 17 March 1960), was a British genitourinary surgeon at Salford Royal Hospital. In 1929 he described the first series of bladder tumours due to the dye industry in Britain. He was president of the section of urology at the Royal Society of Medicine in 1934, Hunterian professor at the Royal College of Surgeons in 1947, and in 1951 was the first to be awarded the St Peter's Medal of the British Association of Urological Surgeons. In 1927 he published Cystoscopy and Urography, which at the time of his death was in its third edition.

== See also ==
- List of recipients of the St Peter's Medal
