= Scardino =

Scardino is a surname. Notable people with the surname include:

- Don Scardino (born 1948), American television director and producer
- Hal Scardino (born 1982), American actor
- Marjorie Scardino (born 1947), American-born British business executive
- Peter T. Scardino (born 1945), American cancer surgeon
