= James N'Dow =

British urological surgeon and academic

James N'Dow OBE DL FRCSEd
- Born: James Michael Olu N'Dow
- Education: University of Aberdeen
- Known for: Urology research
- Awards: Officer of the Order of the British Empire; Deputy Lieutenant; St Peter's Medal
- Scientific career
- Fields: Urological surgery; global health
- Institutions: University of Aberdeen; NHS Grampian

James N'Dow OBE DL FRCSEd is a British urological surgeon, academic, and global health advocate. He is Professor of Urological Surgery and Director of the Academic Urology Unit at the University of Aberdeen, and also serves with NHS Grampian as a consultant urological surgeon. N'Dow is the Adjunct Secretary General (Education) of the European Association of Urology (EAU). His work spans clinical research, urological guideline development, big-data collaborations, and charitable health initiatives in Scotland and internationally.

== Early life and education ==
N'Dow originally arrived in Aberdeen in 1985 as a medical student on a British Council scholarship from The Gambia. He studied medicine at the University of Aberdeen, earning his MB ChB in 1990. He later completed surgical training, receiving FRCS (Ed) in 1994, FRCS (Urol) in 1999, and an MD with Commendation in 1999. He obtained his Certificate of Completion of Specialist Training in 2000.

== Career ==
N'Dow has been Professor of Urological Surgery and Director of the Academic Urology Unit at the University of Aberdeen since 2001, working jointly with NHS Grampian as a consultant urological surgeon. He is also a Trustee of the University of Aberdeen Development Trust.

Since 2024, he has served as the Chair of the Legacies of Slavery Listening Exercise at the University of Aberdeen.

=== European Association of Urology ===
N'Dow has held senior roles within the European Association of Urology (EAU). He served on the EAU Guidelines Board (2010–2022) and was Chairman of the EAU Guidelines Office from 2014 to 2021. Since 2021, he has served as the EAU Adjunct Secretary General (Education).

== Research ==
N'Dow coordinates major European research consortia under the Innovative Medicines Initiative. He leads the PIONEER consortium, a €12 million project utilising big data to improve outcomes for prostate cancer patients. He also coordinates OPTIMA, a €21.3 million project focused on artificial intelligence and data for patients with solid tumours (prostate, breast, and lung cancer). He has been a principal investigator for several clinical trials, including the CATHETER, SUSPEND, and OPEN trials.

== Philanthropy ==
=== UCAN ===
In 2005, N'Dow co-founded UCAN, a urological cancer charity in Scotland, serving as its managing director until 2025. The charity has so far raised over £7 million, supporting the establishment of Scotland's first Urological Cancer Care Centre in 2008 and the acquisition of the first robotic surgical system in Scotland.

=== Horizons Trust ===
N'Dow founded the Horizons Trust UK (2010) and Horizons Trust Gambia (2012). The organisations work to improve maternal and infant health in The Gambia. The charities have implemented infection prevention and control programmes in childbirth facilities and provided training for over 500 healthcare workers.

N'Dow has also been involved in the Horizons Clinic Gambia Limited, a major social-enterprise healthcare initiative supported by international financing. In 2024, the initiative secured US$16.8 million from the African Export–Import Bank to develop a new medical tourism and specialist treatment facility in The Gambia.

== Awards and honours ==
- 2025: Honorary member of the Czech Urological Society
- 2024: Officer of the Order of the British Empire (OBE)
- 2023: St Peter's Medal, British Association of Urological Surgeons
- 2022: Appointment as Deputy Lieutenant of Aberdeenshire
- 2019: Christchurch Medal, Urological Society of Australia and New Zealand (USANZ)
- 1994: Fellow of the Royal College of Surgeons of Edinburgh

== Selected publications ==
- Pickard R, Lam T, Maclennan G, et al. (2012). "Antimicrobial catheters for reduction of symptomatic urinary tract infection in adults requiring short-term catheterisation in hospital: a multicentre randomised controlled trial". The Lancet. 380 (9857): 1927–1935. doi:10.1016/S0140-6736(12)61380-4. hdl:2164/2745. PMID 23134837.
- James ND, Tannock I, N'Dow J, et al. (2024). "The Lancet Commission on prostate cancer: planning for the surge in cases". The Lancet. 403 (10437): 1683–1722. doi:10.1016/S0140-6736(24)00651-2. PMC 7617369. PMID 38583453.
- Omar MI, Roobol MJ, Ribal MJ, et al. (2020). "Introducing PIONEER: a project to harness big data in prostate cancer research". Nature Reviews Urology. 17 (6): 351–362. doi:10.1038/s41585-020-0324-x. hdl:2164/15415. PMID 32461687.
