= Eric Riches =

British urologist (1897–1987)

Sir Eric William Riches, MC, FRCS (29 July 1897 – 8 November 1987) was a British surgeon, urologist, and decorated British Army officer. In 1955, he developed a new cystoscope, which was named after him as the Riches Cystoscope, in order to standardise the equipment and its attachments. He gave the Hunterian Oration at the Royal College of Surgeons in 1938 and 1942, and the Bradshaw Lecture in 1962.

== Early life and education ==
Eric Riches was born on 29 July 1897 in Alford, Lincolnshire, England.

He attended Queen Elizabeth's Grammar School, Alford until 1909, where his father William Riches was the deputy head under Mr Staley. He was given a scholarship to another school.

== Career ==
=== Military service ===
In 1915, having deferred his entry to university, Riches joined the British Army to fight in the First World War. On 4 January 1916, he was commissioned into the Lincolnshire Regiment as a temporary second lieutenant. He then served with the 10th Battalion, Lincolnshire Regiment.

== Honours ==
In the 1958 Queen's Birthday Honours, he was appointed a Knight Bachelor in recognition of his service as "surgeon and urologist to Middlesex Hospital". On 15 July 1958, he was knighted by Prince Philip, Duke of Edinburgh during a ceremony at Buckingham Palace.

T./2nd Lt. Eric William Riches, attd. Linc. R.
For conspicuous gallantry and devotion to duty. When in charge of an ammunition dump which was set on fire by an enemy shell, with the aid of a corporal, under heavy shell fire, he rushed at once to put out the fire; rifle grenades were exploding at the time in the dump. By his prompt action in putting out the fire the destruction of the dump and loss of life were averted. He displayed great coolness and courage.

— Military Cross citation in the London Gazette

In 1964 he was awarded the BAUS's St Peter's Medal.

== Selected works ==
- Riches, Sir Eric, ed. (1960). Modern trends in urology. London: Butterworth & Co.

== See also ==
- List of recipients of the St Peter's Medal
