= Henry Head =

British neurologist (1861–1940)

Sir Henry Head
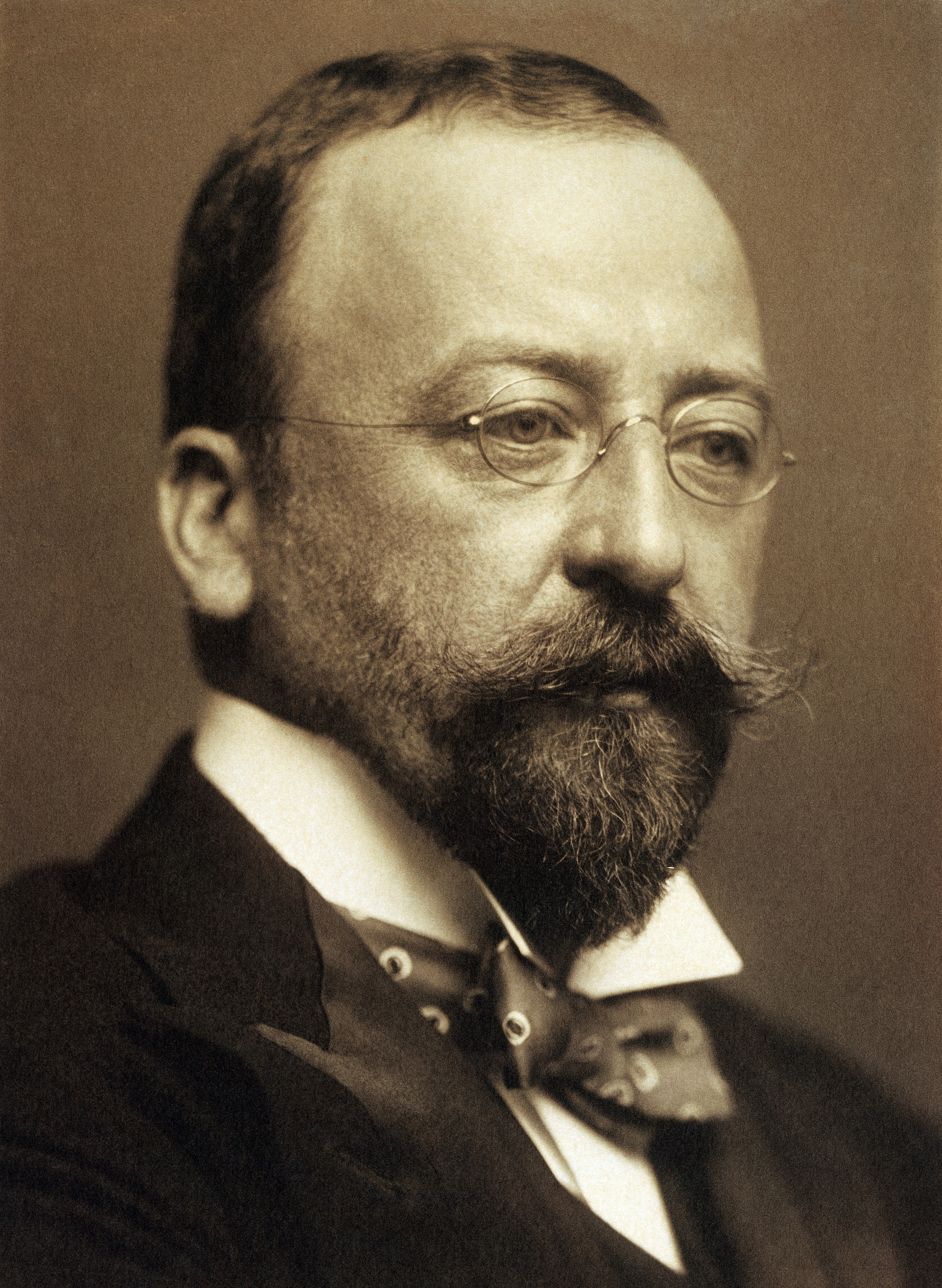
- Born: 4 August 1861; Stoke Newington, Middlesex, England
- Died: 8 October 1940 (aged 79); Reading, Berkshire, England
- Education: Trinity College, Cambridge
- Known for: Self-administered experiments on cutaneous sensibility
- Spouse: Mary Ruth Mayhew (m. 1904)
- Awards: Royal Medal, 1908; Knighthood, 1927; Gold Medal of the Royal Society of Medicine, 1929; Honorary Fellowship at Trinity College, Cambridge, 1930, Fellow of the Royal Society
- Scientific career
- Fields: Physiology; Neurology; Psychiatry
- Workplaces: University College Hospital; National Hospital, Queen Square

Sir Henry Head, FRS (4 August 1861 – 8 October 1940) was an English neurologist who conducted pioneering work into the somatosensory system and sensory nerves. Much of this work was conducted on himself, in collaboration with the psychiatrist W. H. R. Rivers, by severing and reconnecting sensory nerves and mapping how sensation returned over time. Head-Holmes syndrome and Head-Riddoch syndrome are named after him.

== Biography ==
=== Early life ===
Henry Head was born on 4 August 1861 at number 6, Park Road, Stoke Newington (a district in the London Borough of Hackney), as the eldest son of Henry Head and his wife Hester Beck and one of eleven children. 'Harry', as he was called throughout his childhood, was of strong Quaker roots and Head once described his parents as being "the centre of a multitude of friends and relations."

Head's father was an insurance broker for Lloyd's Bank and the third son of Jeremiah Head, formerly the Mayor of Ipswich, and Mary Howard. His mother was the daughter of Richard Beck, who had been a partner of his uncle J.J Lister in a wine business in London, and his wife Rachel. Head inherited a strong love of literature from his mother's side of the family through which he was related to E.V Lucas, the author. Through his mother Head also had surgical blood, related as she was to Marcus Beck. Several of Head's siblings were also to be successful in their own fields: Francis Head joined Lloyd's alongside his father and became the director of Henry Head and Co. until his death, aged 37, in 1905. Christopher Head, a Conservative Party councillor and mayor of Chelsea from 1909 to 1911, took over from his brother until his own death aboard the RMS Titanic in 1912.

Early in his childhood, Head's family moved from Stoke Newington to Stamford Hill where they inhabited a house decorated for them by William Morris. Henry had, by this time, attended two-day schools and he now enrolled as a weekly boarder at Friends' School, Grove House, Tottenham. It was here that he met his first mentor, Mr. Ashford, a master at the school. Head described Ashford as "one of the best teachers of natural science I have ever encountered." This was the man, he said, to whom he "[owed] the fact that [he] was firmly grounded in the elements of natural science at an age when boys at an ordinary school in my day were ignorant of its existence." Perhaps it is to Ashford that we owe the direction Head’s later studies took, though it is clear that Head had a natural propensity for scientific learning, even at this early age.

From preparatory school he went on to Charterhouse, which had recently moved from London to Godalming. Here he came under the influence of a second science master, W.H.W. Poole, who recognised his pupil's innate talents. Under Poole's guidance he was given a grounding not only in the prescribed Biology, but also elements of Physiology. He was also given private home tuition in dissection and cutting microscopic sections.

Having gained a place at Trinity College, Cambridge, the budding scientist decided to forgo his final term at Charterhouse in favour of foreign study. Studying physiology and histology at Halle University in Germany and Head was soon proficient in the German language. Later in his life, Head would be repeatedly mistaken for a German at frontier posts due both to his aptitude for the language and his markedly Germanic physical appearance.

Looking at Head's life and the clearly scientific route that it took, it is often easy to forget that he was also to become a poet. Through his mother he had gained a love of literature and this would do much to direct his choice of acquaintances in later life when he was to become firm friends with authors (most notably to Thomas Hardy) and a mentor to the poet Siegfried Sassoon. This passion was also to initiate another, as in literature he and his future wife Ruth (a writer in her own right) were to find common ground.

Returning to England in time to go up to Cambridge where he made friends and acquaintances who would become distinguished in their own rights: D'Arcy Thompson, W.R Sorley, A.N Whitehead and William Bateson were among them.

=== Medical career ===
Head once stated that he could not recall a time in his life when he had not wished to pursue a career in medicine. He often thought that the dream of becoming a doctor could have first been formed at the age of eight when his family was involved in an epidemic of scarlet fever. He remembered being taken to spend a few days with the family doctor, Mr. Brett, and one morning at breakfast he startled his family by repeating a procedure that the doctor had used during his illness. Pouring a little tea onto a teaspoon, he had heated it over an oil lamp and carefully inspected the result, checking the tea for albumin as Mr. Brett had done with his urine.

Head left Cambridge with a first class degree in both parts of the Natural Science Tripos, and decided to travel abroad once more, this time to inspect laboratories in Germany. Dissatisfied with some that he visited, he decided to travel to Prague to visit Ewald Hering. He was immediately impressed, both by the facilities and the man and indeed the feeling seems to have been mutual as Hering invited Head to stay with him at once. In Prague, Head carried out work on the physiology of respiration and was given an account of his own researches in colour vision. Head would later pass on what he had learned about vision to his friend and colleague W. H. R. Rivers who came to be eminent in this field amongst others.

Head remained in Prague for two years, expanding his knowledge and his interests before returning to Cambridge to complete courses in anatomy and physiology and joining University College Hospital, London, where he was to qualify as a doctor in 1890. There he was house physician whilst also working under Dr. Thomas Buzzard at the National Hospital, Queen Square. His earlier experiences in Prague had created an interest in the physiology of respiration and he was later attracted to the Victoria Hospital for Diseases of the Chest, where he became a house physician.

While respiratory disease intrigued him, it is clear even from his earliest writings that his developing fervour was for neurology. His Cambridge M.D thesis 'On disturbances of sensation with especial reference to the pain of visceral disease,' was based upon patients Head had seen and was later published in Brain (Head, 1893). Which begins: "Several years ago I was led to examine the positions occupied by pain in disorders of the stomach and I soon came to the conclusion that the usual description was incomplete in several respects.... I then began to investigate the distribution of herpes zoster in the hope that a skin lesion which was notoriously of nervous origin might throw some light on the meaning and significance of the tender areas in visceral disease.... I next attempted to determine to what level of the nervous system these areas belonged, with the help of cases in which gross organic lesions were present.... This opened up the whole question of sensation in its various forms, but in this paper I shall not do more than touch upon the relations between the distribution of the sensations of pain, of heat, of cold and of touch." This early work on sensation was later to form the basis for one of his most ground-breaking studies 'A Human Experiment in Nerve Division.'

While Head's main interests are clear, he never limited himself solely to one particular area of study. In his second paper on the subject of pain produced by visceral disease (Head, 1894), again based upon evidence from the hospitals he had worked in, we find him covering a wide field of medicine; considerable attention is paid to diseases of the heart and lungs. He was a general physician with a speciality in physiology, driven by experience into an interest in pain which later led him to find a neurological basis for sensation in general. While his academic interests varied and evolved, professionally he was a general physician from first to last.

=== "Some men find teaching difficult: others are born teachers" ===
Russell Brain comments that while Head was a physician by profession, he was a born teacher. Appointed medical registrar to the London Hospital in 1896 and elected assistant physician four years later, there is a verbatim report of one of his rounds in 1900. On this day he showed the young men a patient with mitral stenosis, adherent pericardium and heart failure. Almost twenty years later, one of these young men (a Dr. Donald Hunter) recorded him as teaching on the difference between bronchial and cardiac asthma.

Head first showed his talent for teaching at the age of 21 when he addressed the Stoke Newington Mutual Instruction Society at the Friends Meeting House, Park Street, on the fertilization of plants. Professor H. M. Turnbull writes of Head's devotion to teaching:

I had the good fortune when first going to the hospital to meet daily in the mornings on the steam engine underground railway Dr. Henry Head. He told me to buy Gee's little book on percussion, and kindly taught me throughout our journeys about physical signs, much to the annoyance of our fellow travellers; indeed in his characteristic keenness he spoke so loudly that as we walked to the hospital from St. Mary's station people on the other side of the wide Whitechapel Road would turn to look at us. I was greatly interested in the central nervous system when learning physiology and anatomy, and so I enjoyed greatly my three months as a clerk to him, his sessions in the out-patient department, and his wonderful demonstrations on clinical evenings. ... He devoted a great deal of time to teaching. In his rounds of the wards his clerks read the histories and examinations they had written, and he criticized even the English. He did not confine himself to nervous diseases, but took more pains than any other physician for whom I clerked to teach us physical signs and – how to examine patients of all kinds. He was a little too anxious to get exactly correct results when demonstrating to students; thus when he was mapping out areas of anaesthesia or hyperaesthesia the cottonwool, pin, etc., would pass more slowly, and the 'say when' would become a little more rapid and insistent, as the correct boundary was approached.

Head's unwillingness to be wrong was not always of benefit to him. One day a fellow of his, William Bullock, decided to test the extent of Head's 'omnipotence'. Asking the doctor at lunch whether he had read Hagenheimer's new book on locomotor ataxia. Head replied he had only had time to glance at it. Bullock commented, "Well, you have done better than the rest of us. There is no such book."

While this experience would appear more 'uncomfortable' than harmful, Head's need to be certain did prove a hindrance when his sensations were being tested by Rivers in their "Human Experiment in Nerve Division". As is written in the report, if Head concentrated too closely on the task, his anxieties about being right tended to make him give the wrong answer. It was only when he forgot completely about the experiment that he managed to be precise about his sensations.

Despite his "need to know", Sherrington states that "as a teacher he had himself a wide and devoted following". His ward rounds were often crowded with students, attracted, as Brain puts it, by his "gift of exposition, enthusiasm, and sense of the dramatic." He endeared people to him with mannerisms which Sherrington states to have been "very symbols of him." One example of Head's confidence and unflappability occurred when he was listening to a female patient's heart. Without warning the patient threw her arms around the doctor and kissed him. Without hesitation, Head turned to his students, telling them calmly that this was "typical, gentlemen, typical".

After the First World War, suggestions were made that Head should become the first professor of medicine at London. This proposal got far but it was not to be. Brain states that it "would have been an exciting experiment for Head" as he had such strong views on medical education. Almost twenty years previously he had written in his diary: "Medical education in England suffers from the fact that the great hospitals are manned by practitioners of medicine who sometimes teach, instead of by professors of that science who occasionally practise."

=== Henry and Ruth ===
Henry Head and Mary Ruth Mayhew (1866–1939), daughter of Mr. A.L Mayhew of Wadham College, Oxford, were married in 1904, seven years after having met.

A young Ruth Mayhew

They were an eminently well-matched pair. Both were unquestionably keen minded. Henry made every effort to be on equal terms with his wife; one prime example of this occurred in 1911 when, frustrated by his inability to speak French as well as his wife, he went to France for several weeks to remedy this. She too took an interest in everything that he did; as Gordon Holmes writes "she shared his interests, stimulated his enthusiasms, criticized his writings and relieved him of many of the petty worries of life."

Henry was a keen writer and on this too he and his wife shared common ground. Ruth was also the author of several books, including two novels ('Compensation' and 'A History of Departed Things'), a collection of the works of Thomas Hardy (with a foreword by her husband) and a translation of 'Der kleine Tod' ('The Little Death') by the German author Irene Forbes-Mosse. Often she published books as 'Mrs. Henry Head' and most of Head's poems are dedicated to his wife; 'Destroyers and other verses', for example, is inscribed 'To Her without whose touch the strings would have been mute'.

As close as they were, often their jobs kept them apart for long periods. Particularly at the start of their relationship they were able to see very little of each other. She had been an assistant mistress at Oxford High School and later became a headmistress in Brighton and his medical career had kept him in London. Even after their marriage they found it hard to spend time together as Head spent most weekends from 1903 to 1907 in Cambridge experimenting with Rivers. To cope with the long periods of separation, they started writing a joint diary and commonplace book. Each had a volume and they would exchange them from time to time so that they could comment on each other's experiences, thoughts and reading.

The one disappointment of their marriage was that it remained childless. Head adored children, as can be seen in his poems and his poetry also gives considerable insight into Head's great desire for a child of his own. In his poem "Long Ago I used to Pray", for example, he takes on the perspective of a woman yearning for 'the fierce joy of motherhood' and presents a sympathetic view of her plight. Head's deeply personal poems also could be said to suggest that Ruth had at some point been pregnant (maybe more than once) and perhaps even to term.

Whatever the case, it is clear that nature was unkind to them but Ruth remained optimistic, stating that this had been more than compensated for by the part he had played in her life. She was his constant companion through the disease that slowly and cruelly destroyed him. As Holmes writes, "in his later years her philosophical outlook, her joy in life and her encouragement helped him to bear an illness which otherwise would have been an intolerable fate to one of his active mind and body." Ruth died almost exactly a year before her husband.

=== Regeneration ===
Henry and Ruth Head appear alongside Rivers in the novel Regeneration by Pat Barker, a name derived partially on the 'regenerating' of the minds of soldiers and the opinions of civilians in the First World War which takes place during the book and partially from Head's experiments with Rivers on nerve regeneration.

From the earliest stages of his career, Head had had a keen interest in sensation, especially in relation to the symptoms of clinical disease. He first looked at sensation through physiological eyes, using his training from Prague and Cambridge, but he soon became aware that psychological factors also had a major part to play.

The first piece he ever published was on the subject of pain and areas of abnormal sensibility and his observations were so accurate that these became universally known as 'Head's areas'.

Head thought it probable that sensation related to innervation of the skin, but there was no accurate knowledge of cutaneous distribution of afferent fibres which enter the spinal cord by each dorsal root and terminate in one spinal segment. To remedy this lack of understanding, Head chose to investigate the anatomic distribution of cutaneous disturbances caused by herpes zoster. A careful study with A.W. Campbell enabled him to demonstrate the zones of skin affected by disease and from this he could chart the cutaneous distribution of different fibres originating from cells of each ganglion and reaching the corresponding segment of the spinal cord.

From these investigations, Head and Campbell made two important discoveries. Firstly, they demonstrated the cutaneous distribution in man of each afferent root, a valuable aid to the localisation of diseases of the spinal cord and its roots. Secondly, they revealed the mechanism of 'referred pain' so often associated with visceral disease.

What they found was that many herpetic areas representing the peripheral distribution of single roots or individual sections of the cord, corresponded closely with areas of referred pain from diseases of different internal organs. This led Head to conclude that irradiation of abnormal afferent impulses produces a state of excessive irritability in the grey matter of the dorsal horn at the level which they enter it. As a result of this, impulses from the skin that pass through it are exaggerated or disordered so that a stimulus that would not usually provoke a painful reaction does so.

Head also became increasingly interested in the mental changes brought on by visceral disease and he based his Goulstonian Lectures before the Royal College of Physicians on this topic.

For the next twelve years, Head devoted himself to the study of the physiological basis for sensation. To do this he studied the manner in which afferent impulses subserving sensation are integrated and conducted to the forebrain. He also paid close attention to the function of the brain in integrating impulses of a different nature and from the various sense organs. Throughout the many arduous and time-consuming experiments of this period, Head is described as maintaining his energy and enthusiasm with his vivid imagination suggesting new lines of thought for every problem. Head also recognised that his enthusiasm could sometimes limit his judgement so he always consulted a multitude of peers when conducting a new experiment.

Beginning by examining patients in whom nerves had been divided, Head and his co-worker J. Sherren soon realised the folly in using patient subjects. Being unacquainted with medicine, the patients were unable to provide accurate accounts of their sensations and thus they were inappropriate subjects for psycho-physical testing. With this in mind, Head offered himself up as the test subject.

In April 1903 an operation was performed by Sherren to divide two cutaneous nerves in Head's left forearm: the radial and the external. The regeneration of these nerves was charted over the next four years. Every Friday, Head would travel to Rivers' rooms in St John's College, Cambridge to conduct the experiments. It had soon become obvious that external distractions had an adverse effect on results and so Head sat every weekend with his eyes closed as Rivers charted the areas of sensitivity.

Head described the data they collected as being 'completely out of accord with any view of the mechanism of sensation as yet put forward'. Head and Rivers had discovered two constituents of cutaneous sensibility: the protopathic system, through which pain and degrees of heat and cold beyond normal thresholds can be recognised but not accurately localised, and an epicritic system which is concerned with the perception of light touches, degrees of temperature natural to the skin, accurate localisation of stimulus and discrimination of two simultaneous contacts. They also discovered that the 'all or nothing' protopathic system was the first to recover after the operation so that painful stimulus was the first to register.

Head spent the next few years following up on his findings. With Theodore Thompson he grouped afferent impulses within the spinal cord whilst studying the brain for its pain centres. During the First World War his studies continued as he worked with G. Riddoch to test reflex activities of isolated portions of spines subjected to gunshot wounds.

Head's final study was one of degeneration, a project made all the more poignant and fascinating by the fact it was, in part, his own degeneration that he was to be studying. As Parkinson's disease worked away at his own faculties of speech he combined his knowledge of neurology with his intensive war studies on defects of speech produced by brain injuries to produce two large volumes under the title Aphasia and Kindred Disorders of Speech (1926). These volumes were devoted not only to the clinical or symptomatic aspects of disturbances of speech, but were also an attempt to investigate the psychical processes concerned therein, and the physiological integrations necessary for the comprehension and expression of ideas as language.

=== 'To Courage, Seated' ===
During the First World War, Head treated patients with brain injuries in London. The war prompted Head to write poetry which was later published in 1919 in the volume Destroyers and Other Verses, it also brought him together with fellow poet Siegfried Sassoon, who was under Rivers's care. After Rivers's premature death in 1922, Head adopted the mentoring role that he had once occupied, comforting a distraught Sassoon with remembrances of their friend and reassurances that nothing mattered except life.

Shortly after the war as Head preceded his guest, Grantly Dick-Read, into the hospital dining room Read heard Head's shuffling footsteps. Head turned and said, "Ah I see I have taught you too well!" This marked the onset of Parkinson's symptoms which would lead him to retire from the hospital in 1919. It was Sassoon who suggested that the Heads go to live in Dorset as a neighbour of their mutual friend Thomas Hardy.

Throughout his illness, Head remained as mentally alert as ever. In 1921 he delivered a Croonian Lecture to the Royal Society on 'Release of function of the nervous system' and he continued to edit the medical journal Brain (which he had been doing since 1910) until 1925.

Head's 'complex personality', the vibrant mix between scientist and artist and his enthusiasm for all that he loved is something that never left him. He talked "equally readily on literature, art, music, the latest scientific achievements and the affairs of everyday life." Gordon Holmes recalled one occasion when he spent a few days in the country with Head. On one evening when they were playing bowls he began developing a theory on how greater accuracy could be obtained; the next day he heard him demonstrate to a chance acquaintance, who unknown to him was an authority on the subject, the architecture of an ancient cathedral, and that evening discuss an abstruse musical problem with an expert musician.

As Robert Nichols stated in The Times:

Sir Henry possessed the fullest as well as the wisest mind I have ever known. It was no unusual thing to hear him in the course of one evening discourse on topics so various as: the influence of reasoning upon Goethe and Mozart, types of apprehension in listeners to symphonic music, sensations while looping the loop (he was over 60 when he did so), the painting of Guardi, 'co-ordination' in a star golfer, Ninon de Lenclos, Conrad as a narrator (Sir Henry was far the ablest literary critic I have ever known), religious ecstasy, the relation of art and science, the social customs of Melanesia. On each of such topics he not only appeared to have more information than anybody in the room, but spoke after a more illuminating fashion, for, like Leonardo (on whom he was an authority) he had a supreme eye for the significant. Nor did he resemble Leonardo in mind only. He had Leonardo's lofty human compassion, humility, patience, and profound serenity of spirit." (10 October 1940)

Head faced his debilitating illness with a great degree of heroism. As Dr.George Riddoch wrote:

When his final work on aphasia was finished we discussed the situation together. With his practical philosophy he accepted it at once, and his amazing power of adaptation enabled him to plan the rearrangement of his life. With his excellent general health he well knew what he had to face – long years of steadily increasing physical disablement, with his mind unimpaired except in its capacity for continuous effort; in the grip of a relentless foe which medical science could not restrain. Without a word of self-pity, with distress only for his devoted wife's heavy burden, he set himself in his methodical way to make his plans, and nothing was omitted. It was as if he was dealing with one of his own patients. His attitude of mind, as always, was constructive and never defeatist. Essentially an individualist, whilst dependent upon friends and kindred spirits, he succeeded in keeping alive his wide interests and, through the attraction of his personality, the contacts which were necessary to him. Science, literature, music, human affairs, all retained their accustomed importance, although in a increasingly restricted sense as the enemy, whom he could not conquer, but who never defeated his active mind, encircled him ever more tightly. Each outpost lost led to new adjustments, every cold or minor ailment added to the rate of downward progress without hope of improvement. But his courage, tenacity and constructiveness remained unimpaired.

To Head, ever the scientist, the illness was his "second personal experiment" and he described its progress as thoroughly as the first. His final wish was to aid 'the purpose of the advancement in England of the science of medicine in the widest sense' with the Royal Society as residuary legatee.

He had been rewarded with many honours for his art of science. Granted membership and, in 1900, fellowship to the Royal College of Physicians, he was also elected as a fellow of the Royal Society in 1899 and was to be given a role on the council, a silver Royal Medal and a vice-presidency in turn. Knighted in 1927, he was also to be granted an Honorary Fellowship at his alma mater, Trinity College, in 1929. All of this well-deserved recognition for a man who, had his headmaster had his way, would never have completed his education.

Eleven months after his wife's death, Henry Head died at Hartley Court. The Death Certificate states cause of death as being bronchopneumonia and paralysis agitans. He was cremated at Reading Crematorium on 11 October 1940 and his ashes scattered in the Gardens of Remembrance. In his Will he left a legacy to science but through the force of his personality and the lasting remembrance of his courage, he left a legacy to humanity:

That valiant spirit has not passed away,

But lives and grows

Within us as a penetrating ray

Of sunshine on a crystal surface glows

With many-hued refraction. He has fled

Into the unknown silence of the night,

But cannot die till human hearts are dead.

(Died of His Wounds, Henry Head, 1918)

== Bibliography ==
=== Science ===
==== 1890s ====
- On disturbances of sensation with especial reference to the pain of visceral disease. (Brain, 1893, 16, 1–133.)
- On disturbances of sensation with especial reference to the pain of visceral disease. (Part H: Head and neck, Brain, 1894, 17, 339–480)
- Some mental states associated with visceral disease in the sane. (Brit. M. J., 1895, 2 768–769)
- On disturbances of sensation with especial reference to the pain of visceral disease. (Part M: Pain in diseases of the heart and lungs, Brain, 1896, 19, 153–276.)
- Mental states associated with visceral disease in the sane- Abstract (Ment. Sc, 1896, 42, 31–35.)
- Ueber die negativen und positiven Schwankungen des Nervenstromes. (Pfluger's Arch f. d. ges. Physiol., 1886–7, 40, 207–273.)
- Die Sensibilitatsstorungen der Haut bei Visceralerkrankungen. (W. Seiffer. 8vo. Berlin, 1898.)
- Trigeminal neuralgia. (Allbutt's System of Medicine, 1899, 6, 724–752.)
- Herpes zoster. (Allbutt's System of Medicine, 1899, 8, 616–636.)
- On the regulation of respiration. (2 parts, J. Physiol., 1889, 1–70, 279–90.)

==== 1900s ====
- With A. W. Campbell: The pathology of herpes zoster and its bearing on sensory localization (Brain, 1900, 23, 353–523.)
- Abstract of a paper on the necessity for isolating the phthisical insane (Discussion, Ment. Sc, 1900, 46, 28–29.)
- Certain mental changes that accompany visceral disease. (The Goulstonian Lectures for 1901, Brain, 1901, 24, 345–429.)
- With C. S. Ham: The processes that take place in a completely isolated sensory nerve. (Proc. Physiol. Soc, 1902–3, pp. vi–vii.)
- With W. H. R. Rivers and J. Sherren: The afferent nervous system from a new aspect (Brain, 1905, 28, 99–115.)
- Case of myoclonus. (Brain, 1905, 28, 362.)
- With J. Sherren: The consequences of injury to the peripheral nerves in man. (Brain, 1905, 28, 116–338.)
- A case of Huntington's chorea. (Brain, 1905, 28, 98.)
- A case of Huntington's chorea. (Brain, 1905, 28, 362.)
- With T. Thompson: The grouping of afferent impulses within the spinal cord. (Brain, 1906, 29, 537–741.)
- With W. H. R. Rivers: A human experiment in nerve division. (Brain, 1908, 31, 323–450.)
- Ueber Sensibilitat und Sensibilitatspriifung. Verhandlungen des Kongresses fSr Innere. (Medizin, 26. Kongress, Wiesbaden, 1909, pp. 168–181, 193–194.)
- Thrombosis of cerebral arteries. (Proc. R. Soc. Med., 1909–10, 3, Neurol. Sect., 30.)
- Cerebral haemorrhage from luetic vessels. (Proc. R. Soc. Med., 1909–10, 3, Neurol. Sect., 31.)
- Congenital lues causing optic atrophy and ultimately leading to dementia paralytica juvenilis. (Proc. R. Soc. Med., 1909–10,3, Neurol. Sect., 33.)

==== 1910s ====
- Occupation neuroses (Allbutt and Rollestori's System of Medicine, 1910, 8, 667–686.)
- Case of syringomyelia with symptoms precipitated by trauma. (Proc. R. Soc. Med., 1910–11, 4, Neurol. Sect., 34–40.)
- With E. G. Fearnsides: A case of functional hysterical trophcedema. (Br. J. Dermatol., 1911,23,150–153.)
- With Gordon Holmes: Sensory disturbances from cerebral lesions. (Brain, 1911–12, 34, 102–254.)
- With Gordon Holmes: A case of lesion of the optic thalamus with autopsy. Brain, 1911–12, 34, 255–271.)
- Case showing an abnormal condition of the nails of the hands associated with secondary carcinomatosis. Proc. R. Soc. Med., 1911–12, 5, Dermat. Sect., 102–104.)
- With J. H. Sequeira: Case of double cervical ribs associated with vascular phenomena suggesting Raynaud's disease. Proc. R. Soc. Med., 1911–12, 5, Dermat. Sect., 110–113.)
- Three brothers illustrating an unusual form of family paralysis (familial sclerosis) with amyotrophy. (Proc. R. Soc. Med., 1911–12,5, Neurol. Sect., 144–148.)
- Double cervical ribs associated with vaso-motor disturbances- Raynaud's phenomena- of left forearm and hand and of right hand, with slight wasting and weakness of muscles of left hand. (Br. J. Dermatol., 1912, 24, 152–154.)
- With Gordon Holmes: Researches into sensory disturbances from cerebral lesions (Lancet, 1912, 1, 1–4, 79–83, 144–152.)
- Six clinical lectures on the diagnostic value of sensory changes in diseases of the nervous system. (Clin. J., 1912, 40, 337, 358, 375, 396,408; 1913, 42, 23.)
- Nystagmoid movements of palate and lids, lateral and rotatory nystagmus, cerebellar incoordination. (Proc. R. Soc. Med., 1912–13, 6, Neurol. Sect., 53.)
- Athetosis of left hand with tremor of right hand. (Proc. R. Soc. Med., 1912–13, 6, Neurol. Sect., 81–84.)
- With J. Mclntosh, P. Fildes, and E. G. Fearnsides: Parasyphilis of the nervous system. (Brain, 1914, 36, 1–30.)
- With E. G. Fearnsides: The clinical aspects of syphilis of the nervous system in the light of the Wassermann reaction and treatment with neosalvarsan. (Brain, 1914–15, 37,1–140.)
- Hughlings Jackson on aphasia and kindred affections of speech; together with a complete bibliography of Dr. Jackson's publications on speech, and a reprint of some of the most important papers. (Brain, 1915, 38, 1–190.)
- With G. Riddoch: The automatic bladder, excessive sweating and some other reflex conditions, in gross injuries of the spinal cord. (Brain, 1917, 40, 188–263.)
- Sensation and the cerebral cortex. (Brain, 1918, 41, 58–253.)
- Cases of wounds of the nervous system. (Proc. R. Soc. Med., 1918, 11, Sect. Neurol. 27–29.)
- With G. Riddoch: Traitement des complications secondaires et tardives des blessures du cerveau par coups de feu. (Arch, de mid. et pharm. mil, 1918, 69, 259–263.)
- President's address. Some principles of neurology. (Proc. R. Soc. Med., 1918–19, 12, Sect. Neurol., 1–12. Also in Brain, 1918, 41, 344–354; and Lancet, 1918, 2, 657–660.)
- Obituary notice of Edwin Greaves Fearnsides. (Brit. M. J., 1919, 2, 61.)
- The sense of stability and balance in the air. (Reports of the Air Medical Investigation Committee. Medical Research Committee, Special Report Series, No. 28. London, H.M. Stationery Office, 1919.)
- Time, space, and material, are they, and if so in what sense, the ultimate data of science? (In Problems of Science and Philosophy, Supplementary Volume II of the Aristotelian Society. London, 1919.)
- Shell wound of head, right temporal region, sensory paresis of left hand and foot; mental and physical symptoms due to hole in skull; effect of closure with osteoplastic graft. (Proc. R. Soc. Med., 1919–20, 13, Sect Neurol., 29–31.)

==== 1920s ====
- Studies in neurology. By Henry Head. In conjunction with W. H. R. Rivers, G. Holmes, J. Sherren, T. Thompson, G. Riddoch. (2 vols. London, Oxford Univ. Press, 1920.)
- Discussion on aphasia. (Sect of Neurology, Royal Society of Medicine, 11 November 1920; Brain, 1920, 43, 412–413, 447–450.)
- Discussion on early symptoms and signs of nervous disease and their interpretation. (Brit. M. J., 1920, 2, 691–693.)
- Observations on the elements of the psycho-neuroses. (Brit. M. J., 1920,1, 389–392.)
- Aphasia: a historical review. (The Hughlings Jackson Lecture for 1920, Brain, 1920, 43, 390–411; also in Proc. R. Soc. Med., 1920–21, 14, Sect. Neurol., 1–22.)
- Aphasia and kindred disorders of speech. (The Linacre Lecture for 1920, Brain, 1920, 43, 87–165.)
- With G. Riddoch: Sensory disturbances in the hand following injuries of the cerebral cortex. (Brit. M. J., 1920, 2, 782–783.)
- Disorders of symbolic thinking and expression. (Br. J. Psychol., General Sect., 1920–21, 11, 179–193.)
- Release of function in the nervous system. (Croonian Lecture. Proc. Roy. Soc, Lond., 1920–21, s.B, 92, 184–209; also in Psychiat. en Neurol. Bl, Amst., 1922, 26, 13–47; and depsychol. norm, etpath., Paris, 1923, 20, 501–532.
- W. H. R. Rivers, M.D., D.Sc., F.R.S.: an appreciation. (Brit. M. J., 1922, 1, 977–978.)
- An address on certain aspects of pain. (Brit. M. J., 1922, 1, 1–5.)
- An address on the diagnosis of hysteria. (Brit. M. J., 1922, 1, 827–829.)
- Speech and cerebral localization. (The Cavendish Lecture, 1923, West Lond. M., 1923, 28, 99–122.)
- Speech and cerebral localization (Brain, 1923, 46, 355–528.)
- A case of acute verbal aphasia followed through the various stages of recovery. Schweiz. Arch.f. Neurol. u. Psychiat., 1923,13, 313–324.)
- The conception of nervous and mental energy II. ('Vigilance'; a physiological state of the nervous system, Br. J. Psychol. Gen. Sect., 1923–24, 14, 126–147.)
- The importance of mental factors in the life of the community. (A paper read at the Annual Meeting of the Dorset Voluntary Association for Mental Welfare, 23 April 1924. 8vo. Dorchester, 1924.)
- Aphasia and kindred disorders of speech. (2 vols. Cambridge, Univ. Press, 1926.)

=== Poetry ===
- 'Pastoral'. (Published privately.)
- 'Spring Death'. (Published privately.)
- 'Songs of La Mouche and Other Verses'. (Published privately.)
- 'Destroyers and Other Poems'. (Oxford University Press, 1919; New York, 1919.)

== Television portrayal ==
Dr Henry Head is played by Anton Lesser in the BBC series Casualty 1909 (known as London Hospital when broadcast by TVOntario).

== See also ==
- Body image
