= Syclix =

Surgical instrument

- [edit on Wikidata]

Syclix is a surgical tool used in minimally invasive surgical procedures, inspired by surgeon John Wickham and designed by Random Design Ltd. It was the winner of the 2006 Horner’s Plastics Innovation and Design Award. Instead of a traditional ring handle, it is operated by rolling it between the thumb and forefinger, similar to holding a pen, allowing precise control with very little arm movement. It is built and assembled by Sovrin Plastics.
