= Peter Christopher Caldwell =

British zoologist (1927–1979)

Peter Christopher Caldwell, FRS, (25 January 1927 – 1 June 1979) was a professor of Zoology at the University of Bristol.

== Early life and education ==
He was born in Appleton, Cheshire, and schooled at the Benedictine Ampleforth College. He studied Natural Science at Trinity College, Oxford for which he received a scholarship.

== Research ==
Following his undergraduate studies, Peter Caldwell worked with Professor Cyril Hinshelwood, completing his PhD on the influences on the growth rate of bacteria, which led to important ideas about the ways in which cells synthesized proteins. The key new idea was that a coded sequence of nucleic acids specified the sequence of amino acids in a protein.

In 1950 he moved to University College London to work with the Nobel prize winning Archibald Hill, where he developed new methods for measuring pH.

In 1955 he joined the Marine Biological Association's Laboratory in Plymouth, working with squid nerves and crab muscles to study the energy sources for the complex processes involved in the neuronal communication and muscle contraction.

IN 1960 he moved to the University of Bristol Department of Zoology as a lecturer, then reader (1966), then "personal chair" (Professor; 1978). While there, his work included the introduction of EGTA as a tool to study the regulation of Ca^{2+} inside cells, using it to make the first accurate measurements of the very low free Ca^{2+} concentration in muscle.

== Personal life ==
He married Phoebe-Ann Hill, the daughter of Air Chief Marshal Sir Roderic Hill, who was Rector of Imperial College London, subsequent having five children. He was an excellent pianist and music theorist.

== Influence ==
In addition to his direct scientific contributions, his PhD students have gone on to be influential scientists in medical research, including Professors Alison Brading and Clive Ellory (Oxford).
