= Ronald Ogier Ward =

British urologist

Ronald Ogier Ward (6 March 1886 4 April 1971) was a British urologist, past president of the urology section of the Royal Society of Medicine and the first president of the British Association of Urological Surgeons (BAUS). In 1951, together with Terence Millin, he received the St Peter's Medal.
