= Millais Culpin =

English physician and psychotherapist

- Born: January 6, 1874; Ware, Hertfordshire, England
- Died: September 14, 1952 (aged 78); St Albans, England
- Occupations: Physician, psychotherapist

Millais Culpin FRCS (January 6, 1874 –September 14, 1952) was an English physician and psychotherapist. Culpin is commemorated by a blue plaque in Meads, Loughton. Most known for his work during the First World War, Culpin treated shell-shocked soldiers at the Ewell War Hospital.

Culpin is a character in the television series Casualty 1900s, played by William Houston.

== Early life and education ==
Culpin was born on 6 January 1874, in Ware, Hertfordshire, the second of six children born to Millice Culpin (1847–1941) and Hanna Louisa (née Munsey) Culpin (1848–1934). Culpin spent his early years in Stoke Newington, where he attended the Hackney Downs School and acquired a lifelong interest in entomology.

Culpin then attended the University of London in 1891 while the rest of his family emigrated to Australia. Culpin's father settled the family in Brisbane and set up a medical practice.

== Career ==
In 1892, Culpin took a temporary assistant teaching position at a school in Laura, Queensland following an unprofitable time in the Gympie Goldfields. While in the teaching position, Cuplin wrote multiple letters that were later published by his daughter and pursued an interest in insects. After four years of the teaching position, he moved to Ross Island, Townsville and continued to assistant teach.

In 1897, Culpin returned to England to study at the London Hospital in Whitechapel, becoming a Licentiate of the Royal College of Physicians in 1902. He went back to Queensland for a year to assist his father in Brisbane before re-enrolling at the London Hospital. He graduated with a Bachelor of Medicine and a Bachelor of Surgery in 1905 and became a Fellow of the Royal College of Surgeons in 1907.

Culpin traveled to Shanghai where he worked as a surgeon treating casualties during the Revolution of 1911. Although the revolution only lasted around four months, Culpin remained in Shanghai. While in Shanghai, Culpin met Ethel Maude Bennett (1874–1966), a nurse at the Shanghai-Nanking Railway Hospital. They married in 1913 and had their only child Frances Millais Culpin in Young, New South Wales in 1914.

After the birth of their daughter, the family returned to England where Culpin had the hopes of opening a practice. However, Culpin was commissioned into the Royal Army Medical Corps as a surgeon when World War I broke out. While working in France he encountered many cases of Shell Shock.

Culpin was one of the first doctors to suggest that Shell Shock was an emotional disturbance rather than physical trauma. In 1917 Culpin became a neurological specialist to the Army and worked at the forefront of research pertaining to causes and treatments of Shell Shock.

Culpin left the Army in 1919 where he was appointed as a lecturer in psychoneuroses at the London Hospital as well as maintained a private practice as a psychotherapist.

Culpin was approached with researching industrial health and telegraphists' cramp where he was able to show that it conformed to a group of disabilities known as psychoneuroses. This brought him into being appointed as a Professor of Medical Industrial Psychology at the School of Hygiene and Tropical Medicine in London in 1931.

== Later and personal life ==
Culpin retired in 1939 but continued to investigate problems of miner's nystagmus, became president of the British Psychological Association in 1944, was involved in the China Medical Aid Committee, and maintained his interests in mental traumas during throughout World War II.

Culpin died on 14 September 1952, aged 78, in St Albans from pulmonary embolism.

== Publications ==
- Mental Abnormality: Facts and Theories (1948)
- Psychology in Medicine (1945)
- Recent Advances in the Study of Psychoneuroses (1931)
- Spiritualism and the New Psychology: An Explanation of Spiritualist Phenomena and Beliefs in Terms of Modern Knowledge (1920)
- Medicine and the Man (1927)

== Sources ==
- Frances Millais MacKeith, 'Culpin, Millais (1874–1952)', Oxford Dictionary of National Biography, Oxford University Press, 2004; online edn, Oct 2006 http://www.oxforddnb.com/view/article/51592 accessed Millais Culpin (1874–1952): doi:10.1093/ref:odnb/51592
- CULPIN, Millais', Who Was Who, A & C Black, 1920–2008; online edn, Oxford University Press, Dec 2007 accessed 29 Jan 2012
- obituary: Smith, M (1953). "Professor Millais Culpin". British Journal of Industrial Medicine. 10 (1): 60. doi:10.1136/oem.10.1.60. PMC 1037443.
- http://hopc.bps.org.uk/document-download-area/document-download$.cfm?file_uuid=DB90CC9A-BD85-6D7B-0B27-82B9F9046938&ext=pdf
- Australian Dictionary of Biography https://adb.anu.edu.au/biography/culpin-millais-12872
