= Mary Ruth Mayhew =

English teacher and writer

Ruth Mayhew
- Head before her marriage, c. 1900
- Born: 1866
- Died: 1939 (aged 72–73)
- Occupations: Novelist, headmistress
- Spouse: Sir Henry Head (m. 1904)

Mary Ruth Mayhew, Lady Head, also known by her married name Ruth Head, or as Mrs Henry Head (1866–1939), was an English teacher and a writer of fiction and non-fiction. She was the daughter of A.L Mayhew, a lexicographer and the chaplain of Wadham College, Oxford. In 1897 she met the neurologist Henry Head (later Sir Henry Head) and they began a correspondence, eventually marrying in 1904.

Ruth worked as a schoolmistress at Oxford High School, and was later headmistress of Brighton High School for Girls. At the time of their marriage, Head was aged 42 and Ruth was 38 and "a fit companion for him in intelligence". The marriage was childless.

== In fiction ==
Ruth Head is a character in the novel Regeneration by Pat Barker, which features Head's experiments on nerve regeneration with fellow neurologist W.H.R. Rivers.

== Publications ==
=== Novels ===
- A history of departed things (London, 1918.)
- Compensation (London, 1921.)

=== Other ===
- A simple guide to pictures (London, 1914.)
- Pictures and other passages from Henry James (London, 1916.)
- The weather calendar (Oxford, 1917.)
- A day-book of Benjamin Disraeli (Oxford: The Clarendon Press, 1920.)
- The little death (translation of Irene Forbes-Mosse's novel) (London, 1921.)
- Pages from the works of Thomas Hardy, with an introduction by Henry Head. (London: Chatto & Windus, 1922.)
