= Patrick Gullane =

Irish-Canadian head and neck surgeon

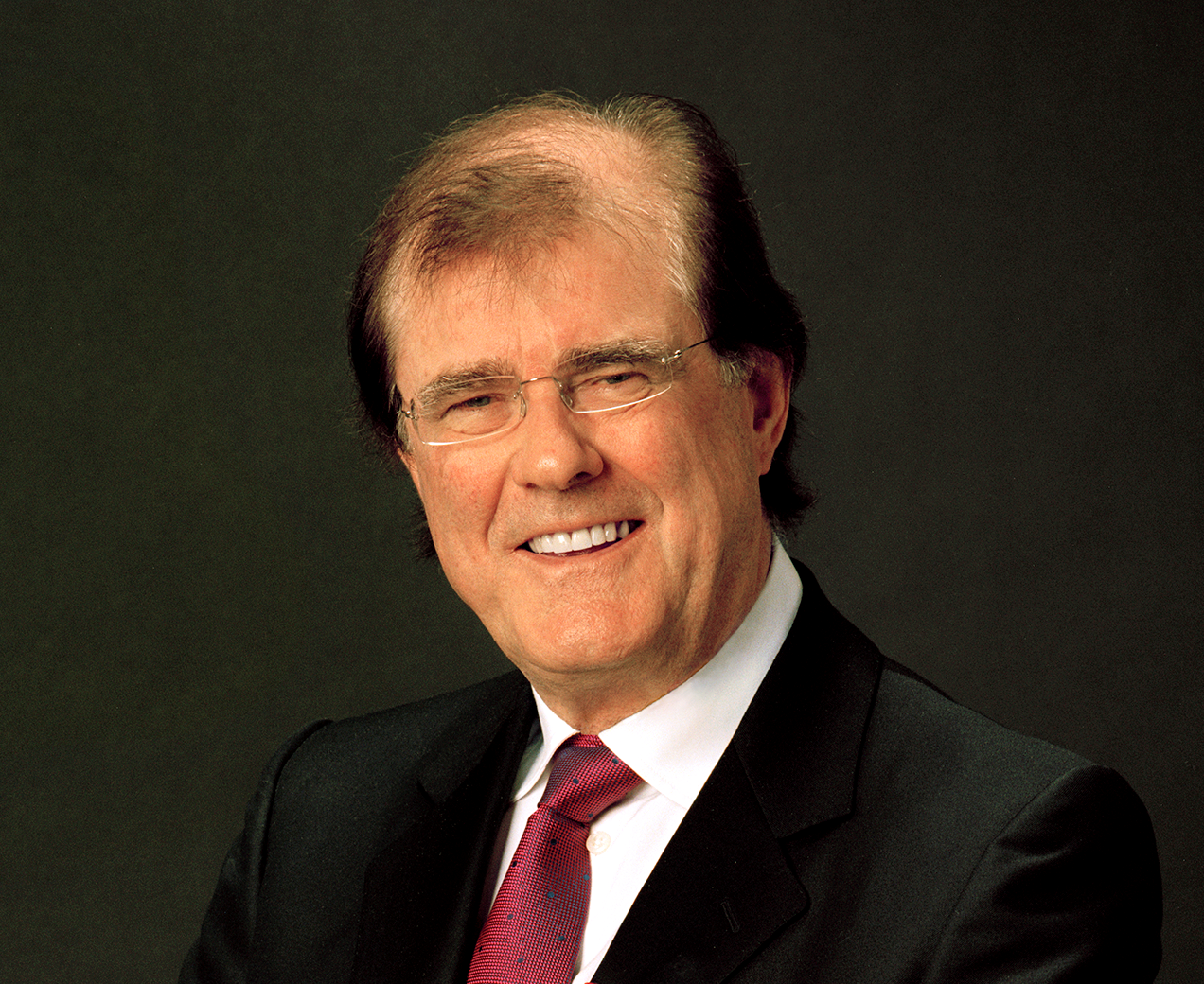
- Patrick Gullane, CM, OOnt
- Born: Ireland
- Occupations: Academic; surgeon
- Years active: 1970–present
- Employer: University Health Network University of Toronto
- Spouse: Barbara Cruickshank
- Children: 2

Patrick J. Gullane is a Canadian academic and surgeon specializing in otolaryngology–head and neck surgery. He is a professor in the Department of Otolaryngology–Head and Neck Surgery at the University of Toronto.

== Early life and education ==
Gullane was born in Ireland. He received his medical degree from National University of Ireland, Galway in 1970. In 1975, he was selected as the McLaughlin Fellow and trained in head and neck oncology in Pittsburgh and New York.

== Career ==
In 1978, Gullane was appointed to the Department of Otolaryngology–Head and Neck Surgery at the University of Western Ontario in London, Ontario. While there, he focused on integrating multidisciplinary cancer care into surgical practice and initiated several clinical training programs for residents. In 1983, he was recruited to the University of Toronto, where he expanded the head and neck oncology program and contributed to developing fellowship opportunities for international surgeons.

In 1989, he was appointed Otolaryngologist-in-chief at the University Health Network, which includes the Toronto General Hospital, Princess Margaret Cancer Centre, and Toronto Western Hospital. In 2002, he became Professor and Chair of the Department of Otolaryngology–Head and Neck Surgery at the University of Toronto, serving two terms until June 2012. He was elected a Fellow of the Canadian Academy of Health Sciences in 2011.

== Research ==
Gullane’s research focuses on head and neck oncology, including oral cavity, salivary gland, and skull base cancers, as well as microvascular reconstruction. He has published over 384 peer-reviewed articles, 98 textbook chapters, and 10 books, including Principles and Practice of Head and Neck Surgery and Oncology. He serves on the editorial boards of ten journals and has trained more than 100 fellows from over 30 countries.

He has been an invited visiting professor in more than 85 countries, delivering over 830 keynote and invited lectures worldwide. These have included the Eugene Myers International Lecture in 2006, Sir Peter Freyer Memorial Lecture in 2009, John J. Conley Lecture in 2012, Hayes Martin Lecture in 2014, and Gunnar Holmgren Lecture in Sweden in 2018. In 2008, he was one of six international faculty members to lead the International Federation of Head and Neck Oncologic Societies (IFHNOS) Head and Neck World Tour Program.

== Other engagements ==
Gullane served as the president of the American Head & Neck Society, North American Skull Base Society, and Canadian Society of Otolaryngology–Head and Neck Surgery. He was the vice president of the Triological Society.

Gullane has been a strong advocate for HPV vaccination policies in Canada to prevent oropharyngeal cancers.

== Honours and awards ==
Institution	Date	Award
Triological Society	1990	Harris P. Mosher Award
Governor General of Canada	1992	Commemorative Medal for the 125th Anniversary of Canadian Confederation
American Academy of Otolaryngology	2004	Millennium Society Award
American Academy of Otolaryngology	2005	Distinguished Service Award
University of London	2005	George Davey Howells Memorial Prize
Royal Australasian College of Surgeons	2006	Honorary Fellowship
International Academy of Oral Oncology (IAOO)	2005-2007	Appreciation of Service
Princess Margaret Hospital	2006	Tribute Event and Gala Evening for contributions and leadership
National University Ireland - Galway	2007	Medtronic Alumni Award
Royal College of Surgeons of England	2010	Honorary Fellowship
Governor General of Canada	2010	Member of the Order of Canada
Canadian Academy of Health Sciences	2011	Elected Fellow
Royal College of Surgeons of Ireland	2012	Honorary Fellowship
University of Toronto / University Health Network	2014	Endowed chair named in his honour the Gullane/O'Neill Chair
Governor General of Canada	2012	Diamond Jubilee Medal
Lieutenant Governor of Ontario	2015	Member of the Order of Ontario
Western University	2022	Honorary Doctorate (DSc)
Princess Margaret Cancer Centre	2025	Inducted into Hall of Fame
