= Prince of Wales Hospital (Benares) =

Shiv Prasad Gupta Hospital formerly Prince of Wales Hospital

Geography
- Location: Benares, British, India
- Coordinates: 25.320035039737913°N 83.00886562415242°E

History
- Opened: 1877

Links
- Lists: Hospitals in India

The Prince of Wales Hospital was a hospital in Benares, British India, built to celebrate the visit to Benares in 1876–77, of the Prince of Wales, who later became his Majesty King Edward VII. The hospital was opened by Lord Ripon in 1877. Initially it consisted of one operating theatre and eight wards. Private residents could stay in accompanying accommodation. Peter Freyer, surgeon with an expertise in operating on bladder stones, was once appointed at the hospital. The hospital was later renamed the Shiv Prasad Gupta Hospital.

== History ==
Ishwari Prasad Narayan Singh, Maharaja of Benares, and other nobles of Benares presented an address pouch to King Edward VII when the Prince of Wales on January 5, 1876, to lay the foundation stone for the hospital in Benares. The pouch was a traditional form of an envelope called kharita that was used by Indian nobility to send letters.
