= Alison Brading =

British scientist

- Born: 26 February 1939; Bexhill-on-Sea, Sussex, England
- Died: 7 January 2011 (aged 71)
- Education: The Maynard School; University of Bristol
- Awards: St Peter's Medal (2006)
- Scientific career
- Fields: Physiology
- Workplaces: University of Oxford
- Doctoral students: Anant Parekh

Alison Brading (26 February 1939 – 7 January 2011) was a British scientist who studied the physiology and pharmacology of smooth muscle, particularly in the urinary tract.

== Education and early life ==
Alison Brading was born in Bexhill-on-Sea and educated at The Maynard School, Exeter, where she excelled academically and in sport, winning the Victor ludorum. While visiting her parents in Nigeria as a teenager, she acquired poliomyelitis, the side effects of which she lived with throughout her life. She was only saved by an iron lung, introduced to Nigeria by her father Brigadier Norman Brading.

An 18-month period of recovery in the Wingfield Hospital (Oxford; now Nuffield Orthopaedic Centre) from the acute phase of her illness meant that she was unable to accept a position to study Medicine at the University of Oxford. Instead, she studies zoology at the University of Bristol, graduating with a 1st class honours degree. She continued in Bristol, gaining a PhD exploring the function of muscle in the tapeworm (Ascaris lumbricoides), under the supervision of Peter Caldwell.

== Research and career ==
In 1965, she moved to the University of Oxford to work with Edith Bülbring, being appointed as fellow and tutor in physiology at Lady Margaret Hall, Oxford in 1968, lecturer in pharmacology in 1972 and a professor in 1996.

Her research focussed on the function of smooth muscle, particularly that which controls the contraction of the urinary bladder and urethra. Her early work focussed on the role of ions (particularly chloride) in the regulation of smooth muscle, developing new ways to measure the concentration of ions inside cells.

In mid-career, she studied the function of drugs that relax smooth muscle, particularly potassium channel activators, moving on to develop important ties with Urological surgeons in Oxford to form the Oxford Continence Group. Her later work was on the treatment of the unstable urinary bladder, bladder outflow obstruction, anal sphincter function (particularly the role of nitric oxide), the role of the pelvic floor in maintaining urinary continence and the role of Interstitial Cells (of Cajal) in the urogenital tract.

=== Role in training and education ===
In the laboratory, Professor Brading was instrumental in training a generation of urological surgeons in laboratory techniques, and also inspired basic science research. She was particularly proud of her contributions to the study of smooth muscle in Japan, where three of her former DPhil students, postdoctoral researchers or fellows subsequently became professorial heads of department (including Hikaru Hashitani (Nagoya) and Noriyoshi Teramoto (Saga)). She continued regular work in the Oxford Department of Pharmacology until just before her final illness. Her contributions are recognised in at Lady Margaret Hall through a scholarship fund.

=== Awards and honours ===
In 2006, she was awarded the St Peter's Medal of the British Association of Urological Surgeons. She was awarded the title of honorary member of the Physiological Society (2008) and honorary Fellowship of the British Pharmacological Society.

=== Engagement with professional societies ===
She was an editor for the Journal of Physiology and served on the governing council of the Physiological Society.

=== Books ===
- Smooth muscle, with Edith Bülbring, T. Tomita, and A.W. Jones.
- Autonomic Nervous System and Its Effectors

== Personal life ==
In her later life she lived next to the canal in Thrupp, Oxfordshire, where she captained her own narrowboat, assisted by family, friends and colleagues.

Alison developed post-polio syndrome meant that she had trouble standing unaided and had breathing problems that progressed as she aged. While still active in scientific research, she acquired pneumonia in September 2010, which, through many months in hospital, she unable to conquer, arguable due to her ongoing post-polio syndrome weakness. As a biographer wrote,

the role of warrior queen was indeed hers: a leader of men and women, a fierce defender and supporter of those in her care, a discerning and critical judge. Cheerful, optimistic, fiercely independent, efficient, and direct, with a special glow for her scientific and clinical friends
