= Edwin Hurry Fenwick =

British urologist (1856–1944)

Edwin Hurry Fenwick (1856–1944), British urologist, early adopter of cystoscopic and x-ray technologies. It was largely through the efforts of Fenwick that urology was shaped into a specialty in Great Britain, recognized by the Royal Society of Medicine.

He is depicted by David Troughton in the BBC serial Casualty 1909, during his tenure at the London Hospital.

His name is engraved on the St Peter's Medal.
