= John Wickham (urologist) =

British urologist (1927–2017)

- Born: 10 December 1927; Chichester, West Sussex, England, United Kingdom
- Died: 26 October 2017 (aged 89)
- Citizenship: British
- Education: St Bartholomew's Hospital Medical School
- Occupation: Urologist
- Known for: Coined the term "minimally invasive surgery".
- Medical career
- Awards: St Peter's Medal (1985)

John Ewart Alfred Wickham (10 December 1927 – 26 October 2017) was a British urologist and surgeon, who was a pioneer of keyhole surgery and the autonomous transurethral resection of the prostate (TURP) robot, foreseeing the subsequent revolution in robotic surgery.

== Early life ==
John Wickham was born on 10 December 1927 to Alfred Wickham and Hilda (née Cummins). Alfred died when John was five years old, which resulted in a move to Littlehampton. He was educated at Chichester Grammar School where his interest in engines and cars developed. Later, Wickham gained a place at St Bartholomew's Hospital Medical School to study medicine.

== Early surgical career ==
Wickham's original ambition was to practice in neurology and neurosurgery, but after working with Ralph Shackman at Hammersmith Hospital, he diverted his interest to renal medicine. He ran the early Necker dialysis unit with Geoff Chisolm, following which he pursued his interest in urology under Alec Badenoch and Ian Todd. Wickham was later awarded the Fulbright scholarship, which led him to Lexington, Kentucky and the experience in intra-operative cooling for ischemic renal surgery.

In 1985 he was awarded the BAUS's St Peter's Medal.

== Robotics ==
Wickham is considered the "godfather" of robotics in urological surgery and also coined the term "minimally invasive surgery". In April 1991, soft tissue was removed from a patient by an active robot, the PROBOT. Wickham, along with Malcolm Coptcoat, performed the first European laparoscopic kidney removal at King's College Hospital, London in 1991; the first laparoscopic nephrectomy for renal cell carcinoma in the world. He encouraged international networking amongst urologists and founded the European Intrarenal Surgical Society (EIRSS) in 1983 with Peter Alken of Mainz, and Joe Segura from the Mayo Clinic. He was an early advocate for the use of percutaneous nephrolithotomy in the United Kingdom, insisting that National Health Service patients and urology trainees have access to the secured Dornier HM1 Lithotripsy machine in the private sector. He was also the first to introduce extracorporeal shock wave lithotripsy to the UK.

Wickham's impact across specialties is reflected in the widespread use of minimally invasive surgery. He introduced extracorporeal shock wave lithotripsy, percutaneous nephrolithotomy, and laparoscopic nephrectomy to the UK. The founding president of the Endo-Urology Society, he was also a pioneer with the Minimally Invasive Society.

Wickham was frequently frustrated at the slow rate of uptake of "minimally invasive surgery" by his colleagues and told The Times, "We still have far too many surgeons who believe that unless you cut a hole big enough to get your head in, you cannot see well enough to perform a proper operation".

After his retirement in 1992, Wickham invented the Syclix, a surgical instrument with a pen-like grip to grab tissue. For this he was awarded the Horners Award in 2006 and for overall outstanding contributions to laparoscopic urology, the Cheselden medal from the Royal College of Surgeons of England in 2013.

== Death and legacy ==
Wickham died of heart disease on 26 October 2017. He is quoted as saying "I hope our efforts over these years may have had some small impact in reducing unnecessary surgical injury to our ever trusting patients." The European Association of Urology's John Wickham Lifetime Achievement Award is named for him.
