= Peter T. Scardino =

American surgeon (born 1945)

Peter T. Scardino (born 1945) is an American cancer surgeon, researcher, and author expert in genitourinary and urological cancers particularly cancer of the prostate. He is chair of the Department of Surgery at Memorial Sloan Kettering Cancer Center.

== Life and work ==
Scardino joined Memorial Sloan-Kettering in New York in 1998, as head of MSKCC's Prostate Cancer Program and chief of the Urology Service, where he was awarded the Murray F. Brennan Chair in Surgery. He currently holds the David H. Koch Chair. He became Chair of the Department of Surgery in 2006. He is also a professor in the Department of Urology at Weill Cornell Medical College and at SUNY Downstate Medical Center.

Scardino is an editor of The Comprehensive Textbook of Genitourinary Oncology He co-wrote the consumer book, Dr. Peter Scardino’s Prostate Book The Completed Guide to Prostate Cancer, Prostatitis, and Benign Prostate Hyperplasia.

== Awards ==
Scardino received the Barringer Medal from the American Association of Genitourinary Surgeons in 2009. The American Urological Association awarded Scardino its Distinguished Contribution Award in 2008. And he received the Society of Urologic Oncology Medal in 2005.
