= Arthur Fergusson McGill =

Arthur Fergusson McGill (8 November 1846 – 10 December 1890) was a British surgeon, anatomist and author, who pioneered methods in prostate surgery. In 1888, he published "On Suprapubic Prostatectomy with Three Cases."
