= John Thomson-Walker =

Scottish surgeon

Sir John William Thomson-Walker, OBE, DL, FRCS (born 6 Aug. 1871, died 5 Oct. 1937, aged 67) was a Scottish surgeon, Hunterian Professor of Surgery at the Royal College of Surgeons of England and a leader in the field of urology. He was knighted in 1922, was President of the Urology Section of the Royal Society of Medicine in 1922, president of the Medical Society of London in 1933 and president of the Société internationale d'Urologie Congress in 1933.

== Career ==
Thomson-Walker was born in Newport-on-Tay, Fife, Scotland and was educated at the High School of Dundee, The Edinburgh Institution and Edinburgh University where he obtained his medical degree. He did post graduate work in Jena, Germany, and Vienna, Austria where he became interested in urology. He joined St Peter's Hospital for Stone in London in 1905 and also worked at the Cancer Laboratories of the Middlesex Hospital.

He was a Surgeon Lieutenant to the East London (Tower Hamlets) Royal Engineers (Volunteers) from April 1902. During the First World War, with the rank of captain, he was consulting urologist to King George V Red Cross Hospital, King Edward VII Hospital for Officers, and the Star and Garter Home for disabled soldiers. Treatment of wounded soldiers convinced him that there was a high chance of infection and death, when "spinal bladders" were treated by catheterisation. He promoted widely instead the early use of cystoscopy which dropped deaths from 80 to 20%. With his surgical skill he was able to reduce the mortality rate of prostate removal from the previous high rate down to 2%. He treated Philip Snowden, 1st Viscount Snowden, David Lloyd George, Robert Baden Powell, and the first Lord French.

He married Isabella Nairn, daughter of Sir Michael Nairn, 1st Baronet in 1909 and had a son and daughter by her.

== Thomson-Walker Collection ==
As well as a surgeon he also was a passionate collector of prints and throughout his lifetime, he amassed a collection of engraved portraits of medical men., in his will he bequeathed this collection to the University of Edinburgh "in the hope of encouraging the study of the history of medicine on which this great medical school has had such a profound and lasting influence". The collection came to the University in 1939. and is composed of more than 3,000 prints.

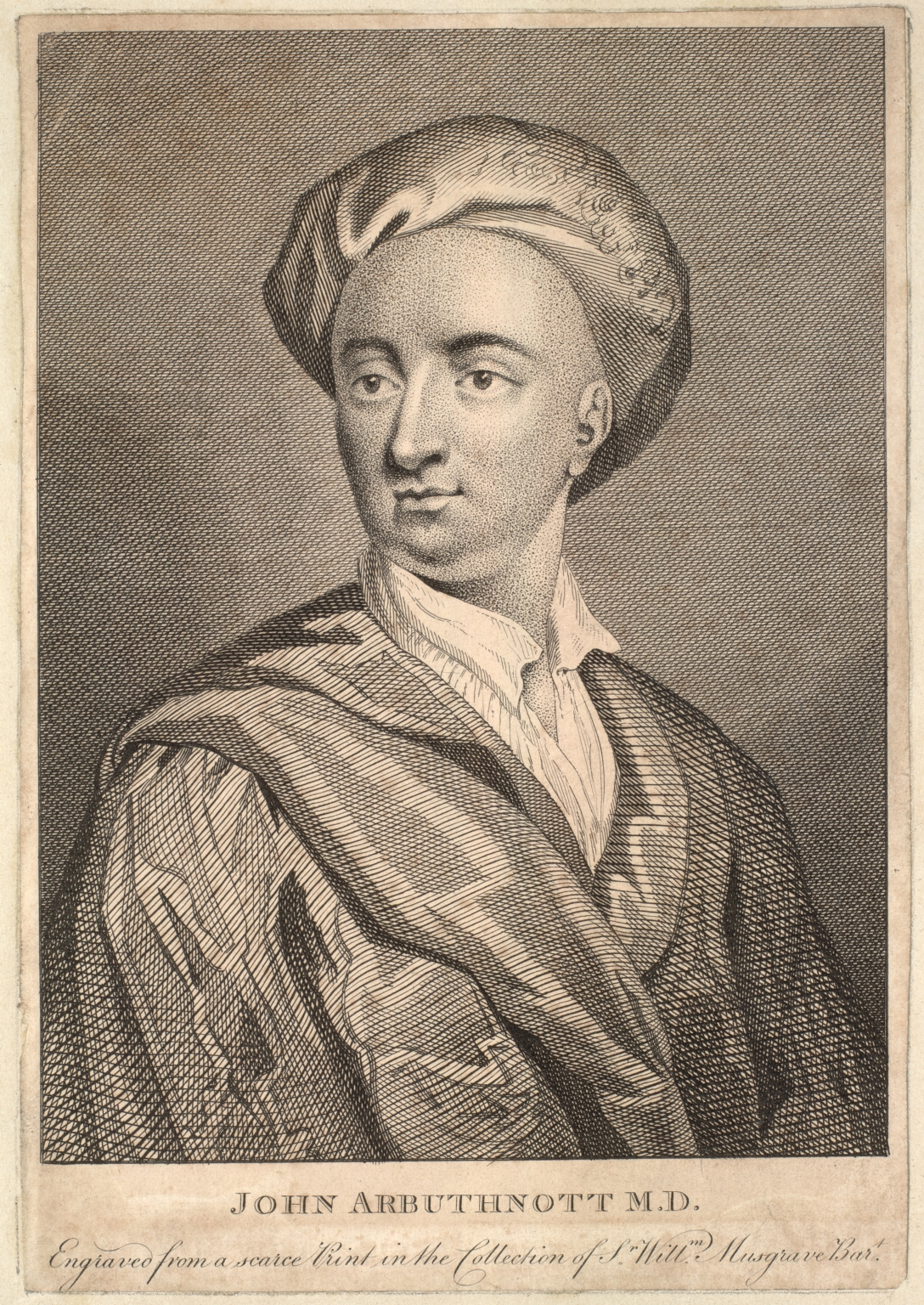
John Arbuthnott was Physician Extraordinary to Queen in 1709

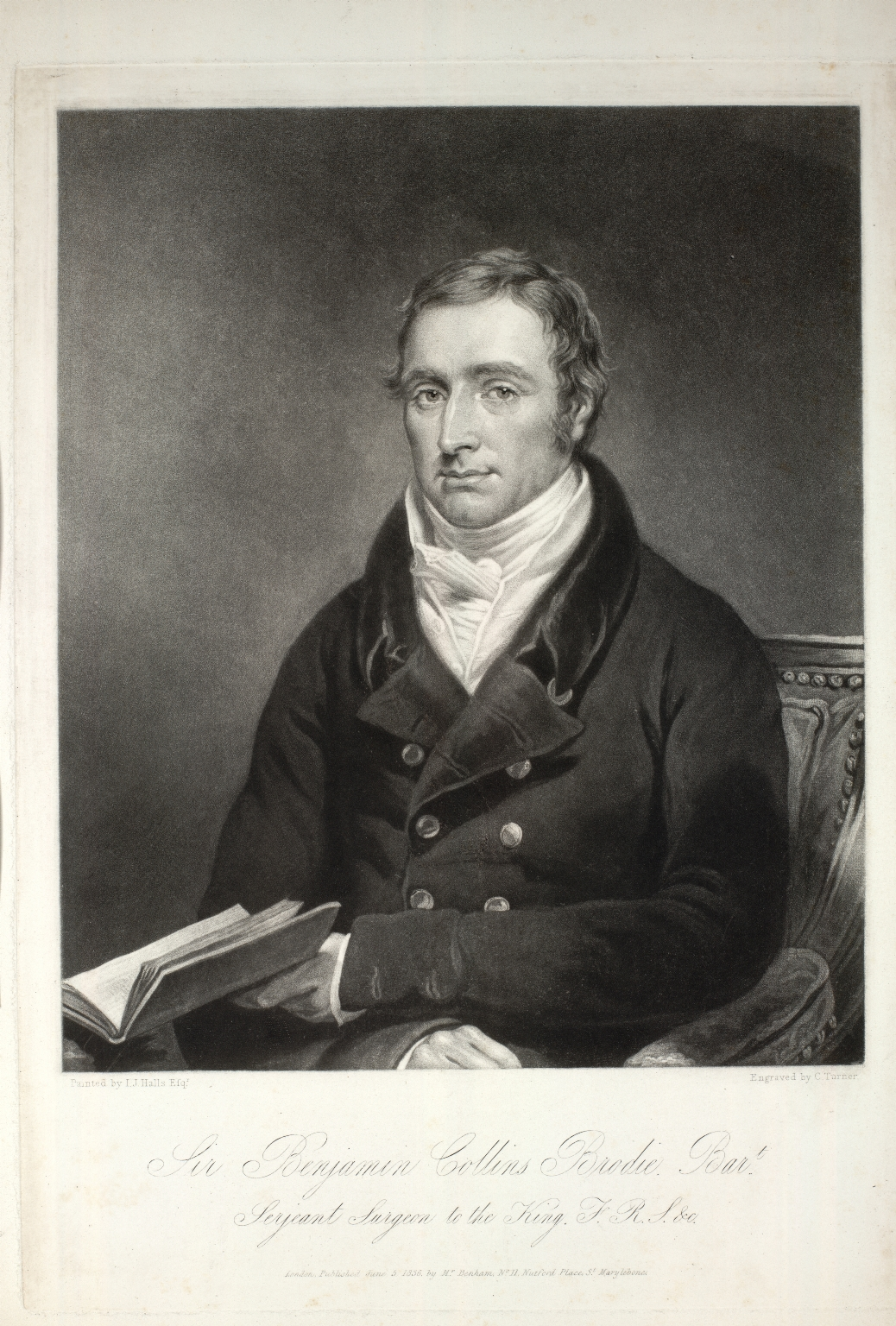
Benjamin Collins Brodie, English physiologist and surgeon

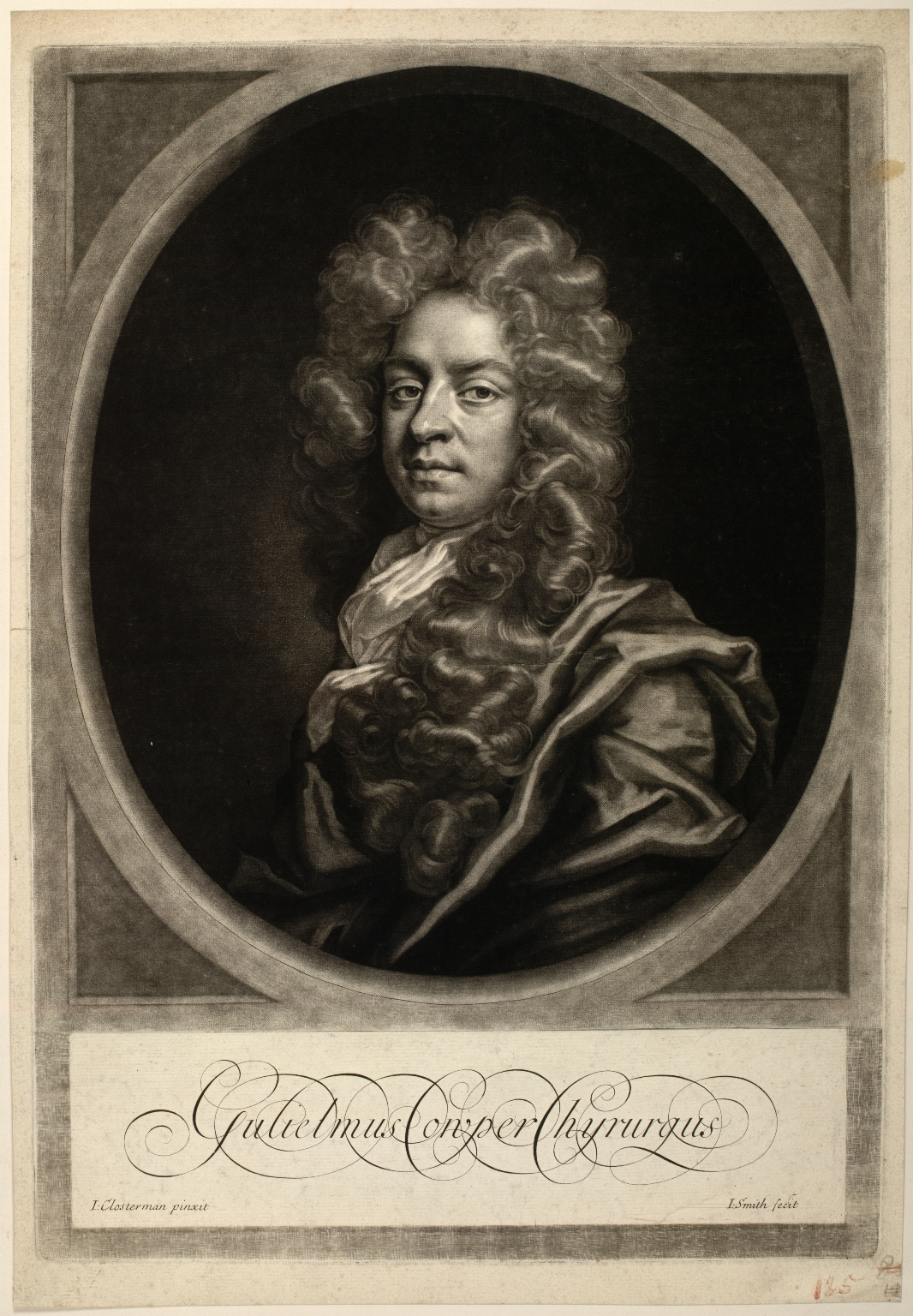
William Cowper was instrumental in changing the standard approach to the study of anatomy and the practice of surgery.

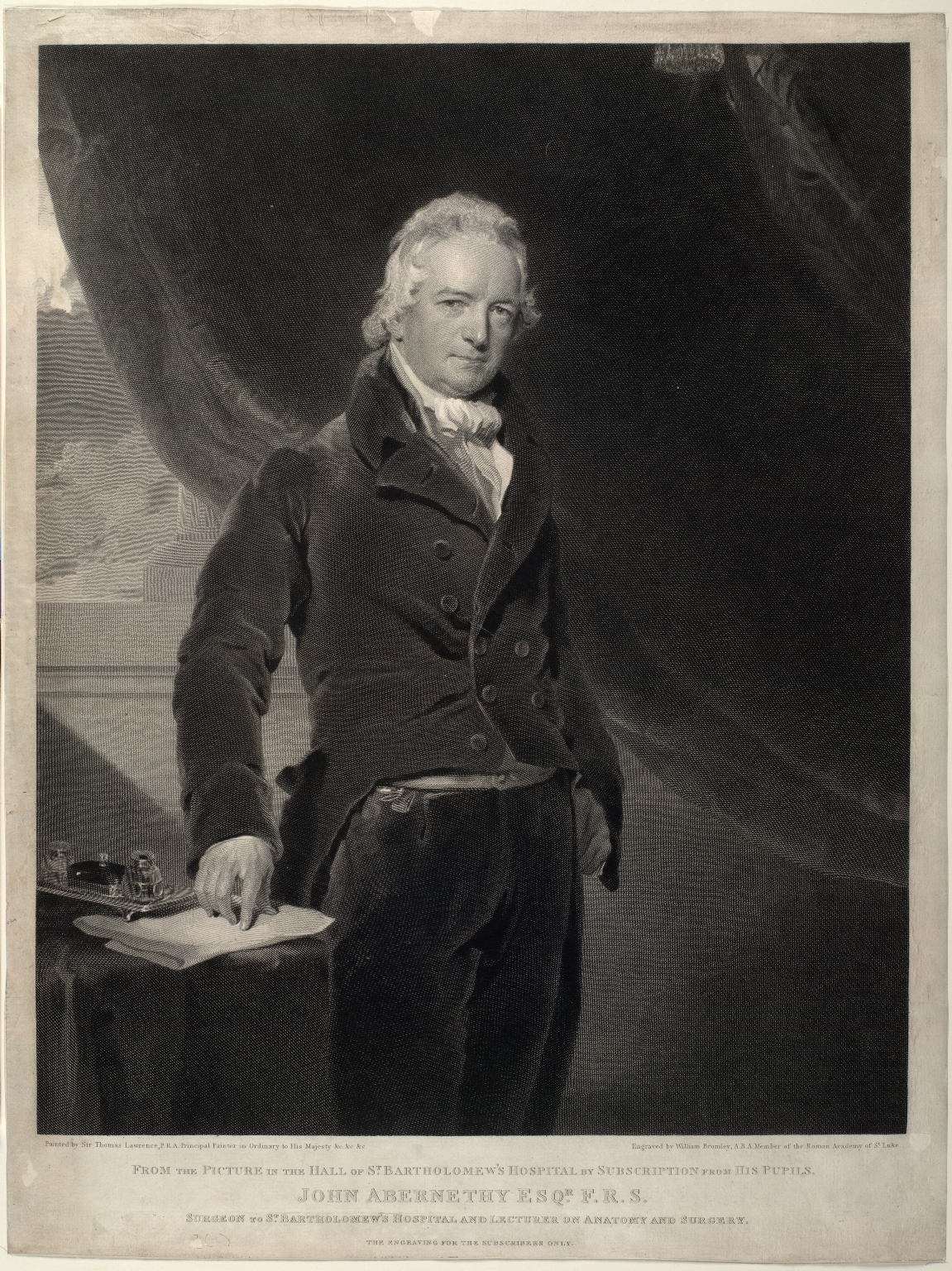
John Abernethy was a surgeon at St Bartholomew’s Hospital, London
