= St Peter's Medal =

- Awarded for: Contributions to the surgical field of urology
- Date: 1949
- Hosted by: British Association of Urological Surgeons (BAUS)

Highlights
- First recipient: J. B. Macalpine

The St Peter's Medal is awarded annually by the British Association of Urological Surgeons (BAUS) for contributions to the surgical field of urology.

The medal was designed and produced by sculptor William Bloye of the Birmingham School of Art and presented to the BAUS in 1948 by Bernard Joseph Ward, the BAUS's first vice-president. The first medal was awarded in 1949 to J. B. Macalpine who was the first to report bladder cancers associated with the dye industry. St Peter on the medal is identified by a key engraved on the bible that he holds. On the reverse is a laurel wreath within which the recipient's name is engraved, and around the circumference are the names of Edwin Hurry Fenwick, Peter Freyer and John Thomson-Walker.

== Origin and history ==
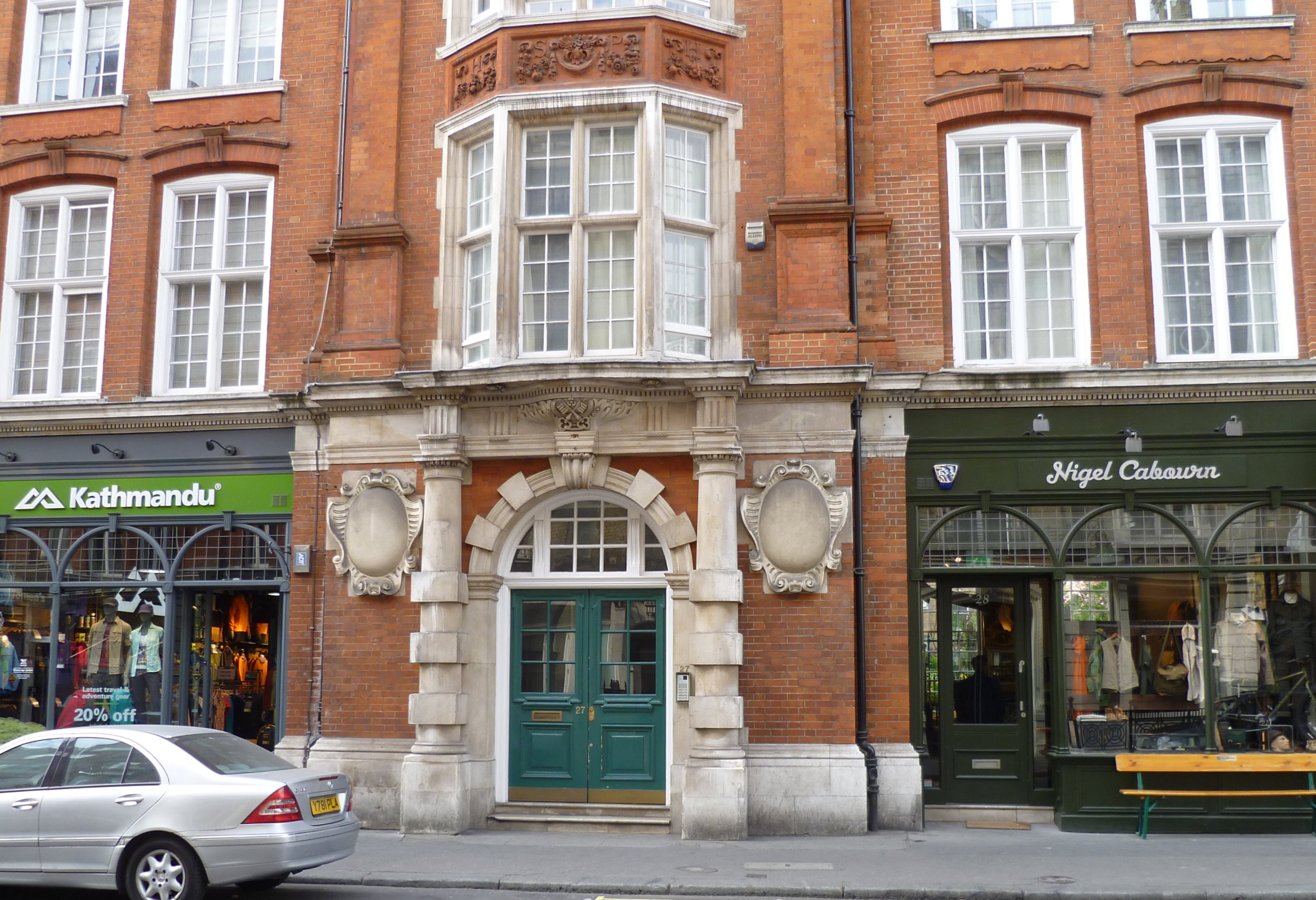
St. Peter's Hospital, Covent Garden, London.

The St Peter's Medal was designed and produced by sculptor William Bloye of the Birmingham School of Art, for the purpose of being awarded to a person who has made significant contributions to the field of urology and is a member of the British Isles or Commonwealth.

The stamping die for the medal was presented to the British Association of Urological Surgeons (BAUS) in 1948 by Bernard Joseph Ward, the BAUS's first vice-president and urologist at Queen Elizabeth Hospital. The first medal was awarded in 1949 to J. B. Macalpine who first reported bladder cancers associated with the dye industry. It has subsequently been awarded annually by the BAUS, usually to one recipient, apart from 1951, 1999, 2005, 2006, 2007 and 2014, when there were two recipients.

The medal is engraved with the names of the three teachers who influenced Bernard Ward: Edwin Hurry Fenwick, Peter Freyer and John Thomson-Walker. On presenting the medal in 1948, Ward stated in his speech that "although they were individually attached to other hospitals, they all came together in one hospital, St. Peter's; and the suggestion therefore was that in order to honour all three of them, we should call it the St. Peter's Medal. The hospital, the first urological hospital in Britain, was named after Saint Peter, whose name derives from the Latin for rock, petrus, and who was said by Christ to be the foundation upon which the Christian church was to be constructed.

St Peter on the medal is identified by the iconography of a key engraved on the bible that he holds. On the reverse of the medal is a laurel wreath, within which the recipient's name is engraved, and around the wreath are the names of Fenwick, Freyer and Thomson-Walker.

== Recipients ==
In 1951, the medal was presented for the second time, and for the first time to two recipients, when Ronald Ogier Ward and Terence J. Millin were given the award. In 1959 the medal was awarded to Harold H. Hopkins, a physicist, and in 2006 to Alison Brading, a physiologist. Other recipients have included Sir Michael Woodruff, Richard Turner-Warwick, John Wickham, Howard Kynaston, Geoffrey Chisholm, John M. Fitzpatrick, Roger Kirby and Prokar Dasgupta.

== Influence ==
In 1975 the International Medical Society of Paraplegia proposed to offer a similar award based on the BAUS's St Peter's Medal.

== See also ==
- List of recipients of the St Peter's Medal
