= British Association of Urological Surgeons =

British medical association

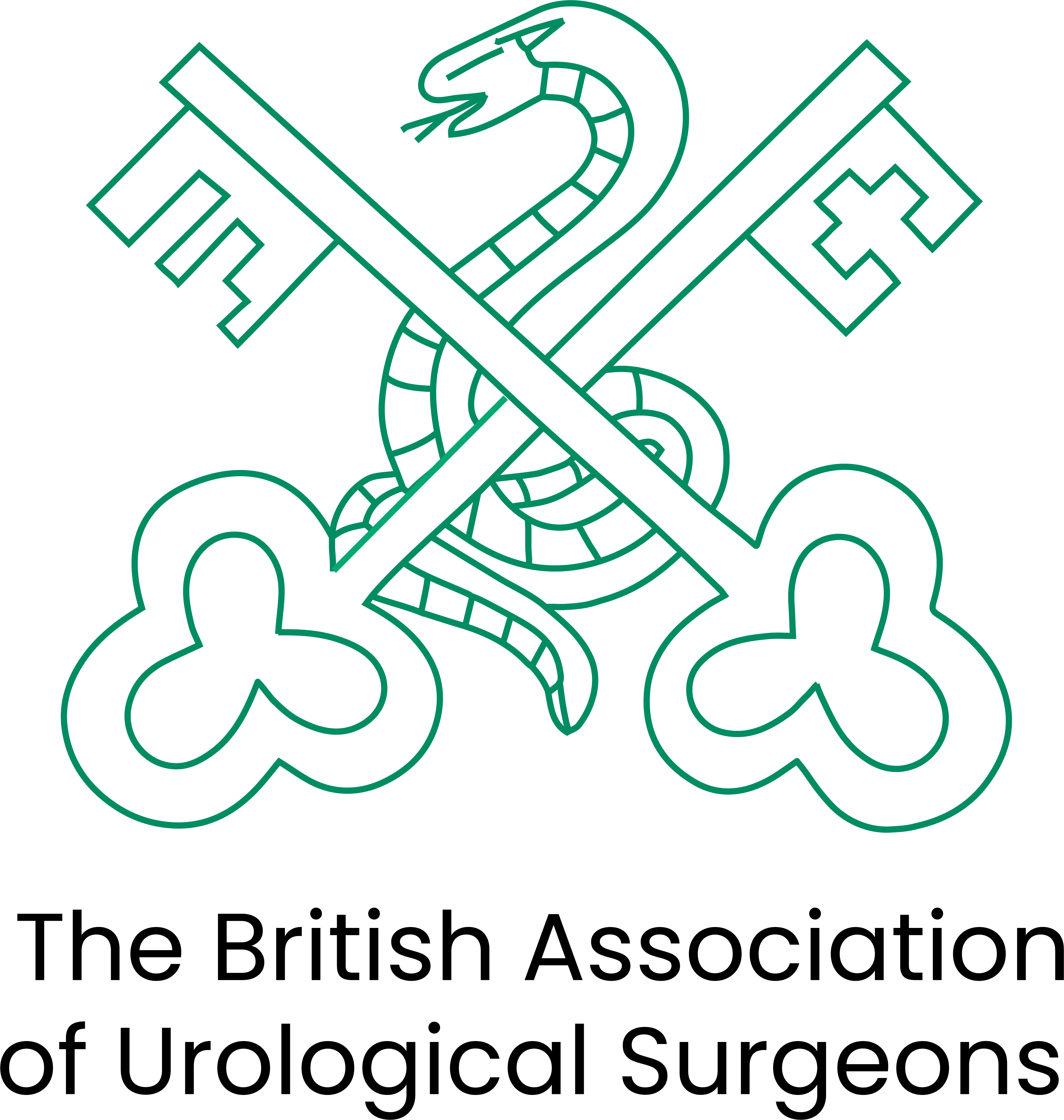
- Type: Professional association
- Branding: Urology
- Country: United Kingdom
- Founded: 1945
- Official website: www.baus.org.uk

The British Association of Urological Surgeons (BAUS) is a professional association in the United Kingdom for urologists. Its official journal is the Journal of Clinical Urology, formerly the British Journal of Medical and Surgical Urology.

BAUS has close affiliate links with the BJU International, established in 1929, which is also the journal of the Urological Society of Australia and New Zealand, the Irish Society of Urology, the Caribbean Urological Association, the Hong Kong Urological Society, and the Swiss Continence Foundation; and the "affiliated journal" of the Urological Society of India, the Indonesian Urological Association and the Investigative and Clinical Urology journal.

Its website carries public data about how many prostatectomies and other procedures each surgeon carries out, so that patients can make informed decisions if they wish to choose a surgeon. The BAUT awards honorary membership, awards and medals to people who have made an outstanding contribution to the field.

== History and governance ==
Formed against the backdrop of post-war reconstruction, the British Association of Urological Surgeons (BAUS) was conceived by London surgeon Ronald Ogier Ward, who gathered 37 consultant urologists at the Royal College of Surgeons of England on 17 March 1945. Ward was elected the first president, with Eric Riches as honorary secretary, and an inaugural scientific meeting followed on 29 June 1945. The new body's early priorities were to speak for the specialty within the forthcoming National Health Service and to agree standards for specialist training.

BAUS is now a registered charity (no. 1127044) and a company limited by guarantee, headquartered at the Royal College of Surgeons in London. It represents more than 2,500 members - over four-fifths of consultant urological surgeons in the British Isles - as well as trainees and overseas affiliates. Governance is vested in an elected council, supported by specialist sections covering andrology and urethral surgery, endourology, functional and reconstructive urology, oncology and other fields; the Endourology Section, for instance, originated in 2002 as the British Society for Endourology before being absorbed into BAUS.

== Activities and impact ==
The association's annual scientific meeting is the principal national forum for urological research and education, drawing several thousand delegates; the 2026 conference is being staged in hybrid format at Olympia, with live streaming for virtual attendees. Throughout the year BAUS delivers continuing professional development via skills courses, webinars and section-led curricula - among them the Scientific Basis of Urology course, FRCS (Urol) Revision Course, FRCS Mock VIVA courses, Core Urology courses. In addition, there has been a robot-assisted surgery training syllabus developed by the Endourology Section - to ensure surgeons keep pace with evolving technique and technology.

In 2004 BAUS launched a national Data and Audit Programme that captured case-level information on complex procedures such as radical prostatectomy, nephrectomy and urethroplasty. Early iterations published surgeon-specific volumes and complication rates online, enabling patients to compare individual performance; later registries remain available for research and underpin peer-reviewed studies of outcome benchmarking. BAUS also provides extensive public-facing resources. Its patient-information portal offers plain-language leaflets on common conditions, while an interactive "virtual museum" curates artefacts tracing urology from ancient surgical tools to modern endoscopes, including a history of the flush toilet. The association confers medals, travelling fellowships and honorary memberships, and in 2022 introduced a Silver Ureteroscope Award for excellence in endourology, first awarded to Gareth Jones of NHS Greater Glasgow and Clyde.
