= Roger Kirby =

British surgeon (born 1950)

Roger Kirby FRCS(Urol), FEBU
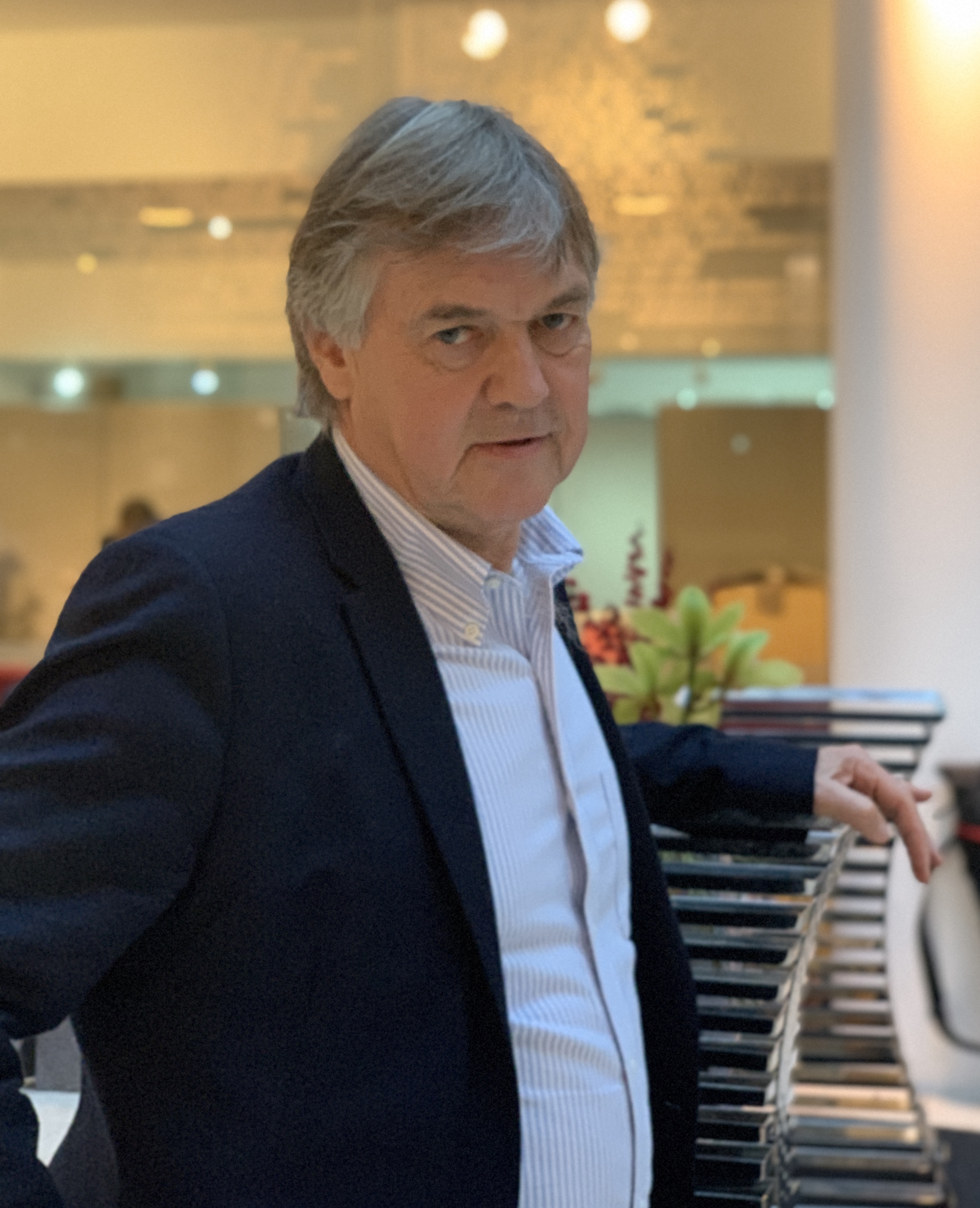
- Born: November 1950 (age 75); Buckinghamshire, England
- Education: St John's College, Cambridge (BA, MB BChir)
- Known for: Robotic prostate surgery Prostate Cancer and Prostatic Diseases (founding editor); Trends in Urology and Men's Health (founding editor); The Urology Foundation; President of the Royal Society of Medicine (2020–2024); President of the Hunterian Society (2026)
- Spouse: Jane Cooper
- Children: 3, including Vanessa and Joe
- Awards: Hunterian Professorship (1986); St Peter's Medal (2005); Clement Price Thomas Award (2016)
- Scientific career
- Fields: Urology
- Workplaces: Middlesex Hospital; Cheltenham General Hospital; St Bartholomew's Hospital; St George's Hospital; King Edward VII's Hospital; Royal Society of Medicine
- Thesis: "Urethro-vesical Dysfunction in Autonomic Neuropathy" (1986)

Roger Sinclair Kirby FRCS(Urol), FEBU (born November 1950) is a British retired prostate surgeon, professor of urology, and president of the Hunterian Society. He is prominent as a writer on men's health and prostate disease, the founding editor of the journal Prostate Cancer and Prostatic Diseases and Trends in Urology and Men's Health and a fundraiser for prostate disease charities, best known for his use of the da Vinci surgical robot for laparoscopic prostatectomy in the treatment of prostate cancer. He is a co-founder and president of the charity The Urology Foundation (TUF), vice-president of the charity Prostate Cancer UK, trustee of the King Edward VII's Hospital, and from 2020 to 2024 was president of the Royal Society of Medicine (RSM), London.

Following his medical education and training at St John's College, Cambridge, and Middlesex Hospital, London, and with a distinction in surgery, Kirby took various surgical posts across England. In 1979 he gained fellowship of the Royal College of Surgeons of England. His early research involved looking at how nerves work to control the muscles used to control passing urine, findings of which disproved the then held belief that retention of urine in some women was psychological, and work that contributed to gaining his MD in 1986. In the same year, he was both elected Hunterian professor with his lecture titled "The Investigation and Management of the Neurogenic Bladder", and appointed consultant urologist at St Bartholomew's Hospital, London. He later took over from John Wickham and subsequently became one of the first urologists in the UK to perform open radical prostatectomy for localised prostate cancers. In 1995, he became a professor of urology and Director of Postgraduate Education at St George's Hospital, London, and in 2005 he established The Prostate Centre in Wimpole Street, London, with the purpose of offering minimally invasive laparoscopic prostatectomy with a more holistic approach, advising on a wide range of men's health, including diet and exercise.

An advocate of monitoring one's own personal PSA level and having spent his surgical career researching and treating prostate cancer, he was diagnosed and treated for prostate cancer himself in 2012, and featured in the 2013 "Tale of Four Prostates", where he was one of four surgeons who freely discussed the diagnosis, treatment and its implications, with the aim of dispelling its surrounding taboos.

== Early life and education ==
Roger Kirby was born in Buckinghamshire to Janet Hazel Sturgess, born in Aston, Warwickshire, and Kenneth Stanley Kirby, born in Whitby, Yorkshire. His father was a professor of biochemistry and fellow of the Royal Society who worked as head of cell chemistry at what was then called the Chester Beatty Research Institute. He died in 1967 at the age of 49, when Kirby was 17. He attended Berkhamsted School for Boys with his older and younger brother, where the three also played on the school's rugby team.

== Surgical career ==
Kirby graduated in medical sciences from St John's College, Cambridge, in 1972 and completed his clinical training at the Middlesex Hospital (later merged with University College), where he was inspired by lead urologist Richard Turner-Warwick. He gained his MB BChir from Cambridge in 1975, with a distinction in surgery, the decisive turning point that led him towards surgery rather than cardiology.

Kirby's first house job was at the Cheltenham General Hospital, where he worked with surgeon Peter Boreham, who encouraged him to pursue the field of urology and particularly prostate disease. Subsequently, he took up posts at Brighton, Wolverhampton, and Gloucester. His other teachers have included Ken Shuttleworth and Wyndam Lloyd Davies. He passed in the final Fellowship of the Royal Colleges of Surgeons in 1979. Kirby later described how a number of people in the 1970s had not heard of the prostate gland. During this time, he had attended to a number of people with large prostates that blocked urine flow and a number of people with inflammation of the prostate, which caused pain. When he did see someone with prostate cancer, only two basic surgical options were available on offer: removing the testicles or an operation that removed the middle of the prostate, the latter being performed to improve the flow of urine.

In 1985, Kirby spent five weeks at the Duke University Medical Center, North Carolina, USA, on a Royal College of Surgeons travelling scholarship. Earlier, as a research fellow at the Middlesex, he met Clare Fowler and together they published research articles on how nerves work to control the muscles used to control passing urine, work that formed the basis of both Fowler's future contributions to continence issues in people with neurological conditions, and Kirby's doctoral thesis. In 1986 they published their findings that disproved the then widely held belief that retention of urine in some women was psychological or hysterical. The condition came to be known as Fowler's syndrome and has been found to be potentially treatable. In the same year he gained his MD from Cambridge, and was elected the Hunterian Professorship with a lecture titled "The Investigation and Management of the Neurogenic Bladder". It was published in the Annals of the Royal College of Surgeons of England, where Kirby showed how the use of EMG could distinguish between people with pelvic nerve injury, distal autonomic neuropathy, progressive autonomic failure– multiple system atrophy, and idiopathic Parkinson's disease, thus influencing the selection of people for surgery via the urethra. In 1986, as the PSA test was coming into use, Kirby was also appointed consultant urologist at St Bartholomew's Hospital, London, and later took over from John Wickham.

Kirby subsequently became one of the first urologists in the UK to perform open radical prostatectomy for localised prostate cancers. After watching American urologist Patrick C. Walsh at the Johns Hopkins University, Baltimore, perform open radical prostatectomies for prostate cancer, while simultaneously preserving pelvic nerves, he became a staunch advocate of the procedure. In 1995, he became a professor of urology and director of Postgraduate Education at St George's Hospital, London. By 2005, using a suprapubic transverse incision, Kirby was performing around 130 of these operations a year. Most of these procedures were performed with colleague and anaesthetist Peter Amoroso.

=== The Prostate Centre ===
In 2005, Kirby established The Prostate Centre in Wimpole Street, London. He had previously been watching the development of robotic prostatectomies, and in 2005, for the purpose of performing laparoscopic prostatectomies, a da Vinci surgical robot was acquired. This provided better vision of the pelvic nerves and at the age of 55, he became one of the first surgeons in England to use one. From 2005, the Centre therefore offered minimally invasive laparoscopic prostatectomy with a more holistic approach, advising on a wide range of men's health, including diet and exercise.

Over the course of his surgical career, he undertook over 2000 radical prostatectomy operations, of which most of the later ones were robotic.

His high-profile patients have included Corin Redgrave, Tony Elliott and Stephen Fry.

== Fundraising and charities ==
In 1995, Kirby helped found two charities: Prostate Research Campaign and The British Urological Foundation, later renamed The Urology Foundation, which was established with funds from the British Journal of Urology International and the British Association of Urological Surgeons. His fundraising activities have included climbing Mount Kilimanjaro, trekking in Nepal and cycling across the Andes. By 2005, he had completed three London Marathons.

In 2010, he stepped down as chairman of Prostate UK to become trustee of the newly merged charity Prostate Action. The Prostate Cancer Charity founded by Jonathan Waxman subsequently merged with Prostate Action in 2012 to form one organisation under the title of Prostate Cancer UK, of which Kirby became vice-president. He is also affiliated with the King Edward VII's Hospital, a charity-registered private hospital in Marylebone, west London.

Some of his fundraising activities have been accomplished with his late colleague, John M. Fitzpatrick and in 2018, he hiked with Sir Marcus Setchell. Kirby's efforts to raise awareness of prostate issues have also involved raising significant funds for prostate charities.

== Awards and honours ==
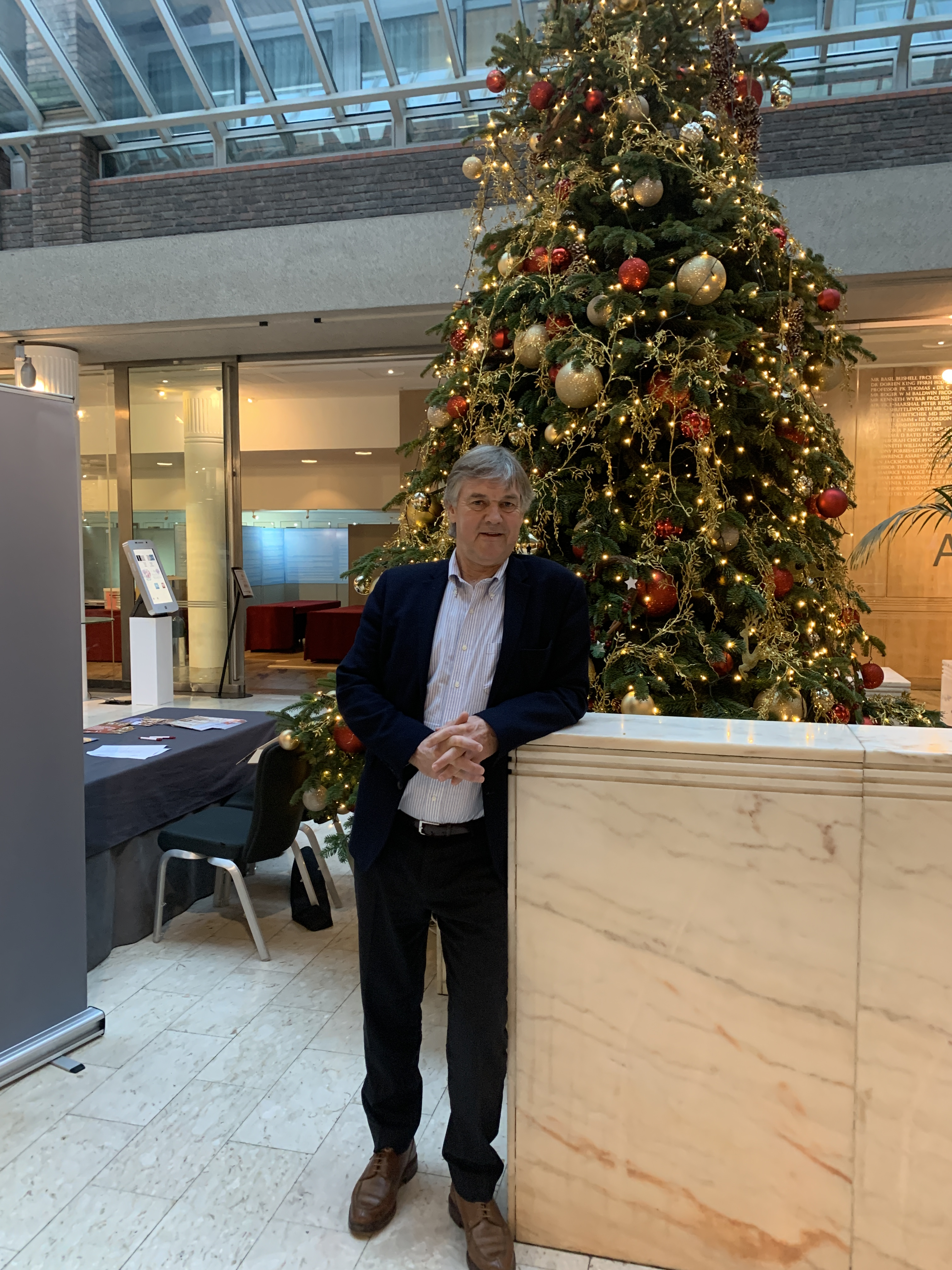
Roger Kirby, president RSM

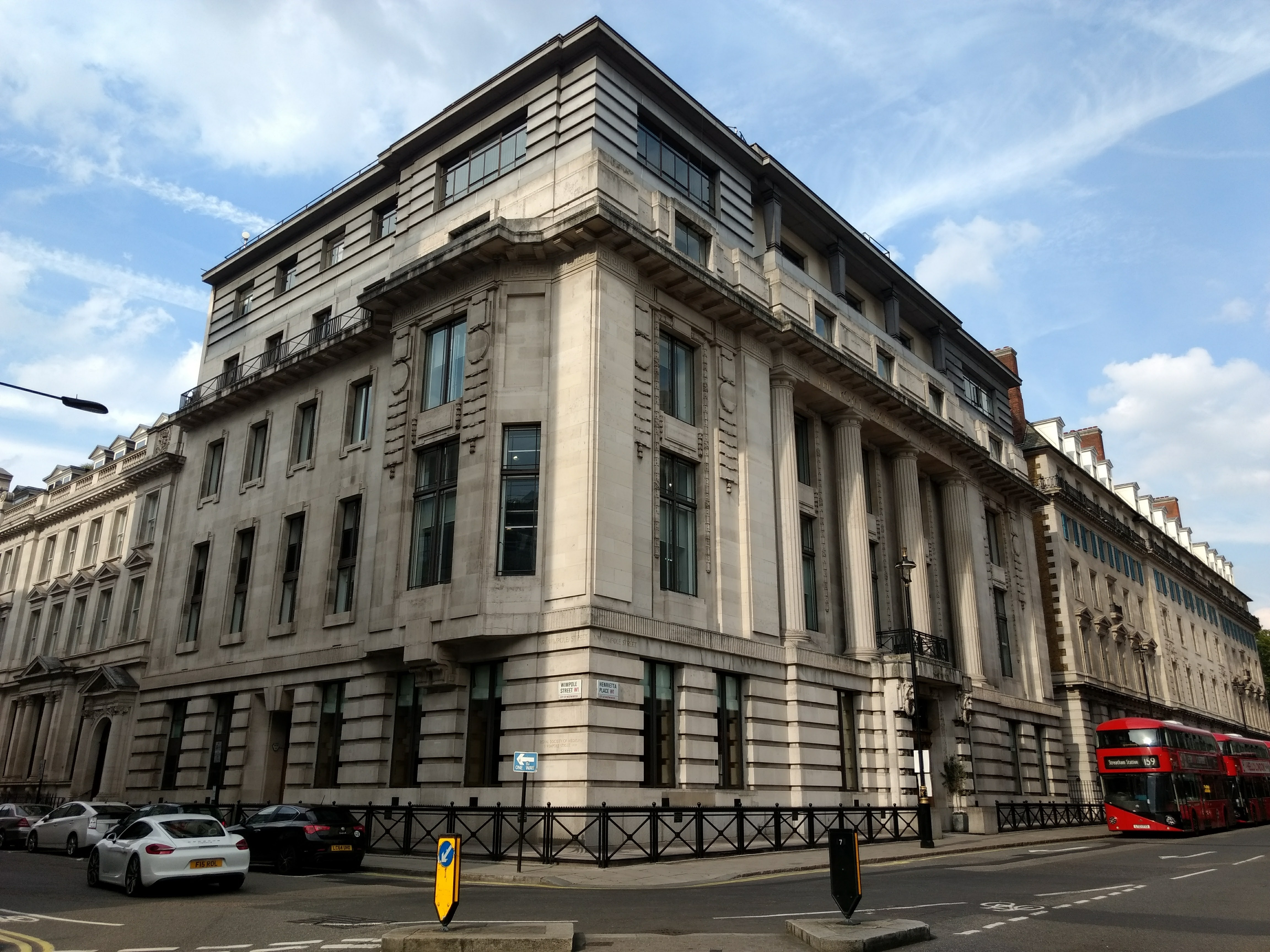
Royal Society of Medicine 1 Wimpole Street

In 2005, Kirby was jointly awarded the St Peter's Medal by the British Association of Urological Surgeons.

Until 2015, he was council member, secretary and trustee of the British Association of Urological Surgeons. Subsequently, he was elected president of the urology section of the Royal Society of Medicine RSM for 2016/17.

In 2016 he received the Royal College of Surgeons' Clement Price Thomas Award. In the same year, he stepped down from the board of trustees of the Urology Foundation and was subsequently made its life president, and took up the role of chair of the academic board of the RSM, In 2019, he was elected to become president of the RSM for 2020, succeeding Sir Simon Wessely. His inauguration as president of the RSM took place on 28 July 2020. In July 2024, he was succeeded by Gillian Leng. In 2026, he was appointed president of the Hunterian Society.

== Personal life and family ==
Kirby married Jane Cooper, who edited Country Living magazine before working as the business manager at her husband's clinic. They have three children: theatre agent Juliet, teacher Joe, and Academy Award nominated and BAFTA winning actress Vanessa.

=== Health ===
Kirby checked his PSA annually, constructing his own personal PSA slope which remained low. However, in 2012, at the age of 61, he noticed a rise and following a 3-tesla magnetic resonance imaging, transrectal ultrasound-guided biopsy and bone scan, he was diagnosed with prostate cancer and underwent surgical treatment for the condition he had treated throughout his surgical career. A Gleason 3+4=7 1.3cc adenocarcinoma was completely resected and he made a full recovery.

Following treatment, he was one of four surgeons who freely discussed the diagnosis, treatment and its implications, and featured in a "Tale of Four Prostates" with an accompanying video in 2013. He stated that he "hope(d) that the openness about our own diagnoses and management will help to dispel the taboo that still haunts this most common of cancers of men".

== Selected publications ==
Kirby has published more than 350 peer-reviewed scientific publications, authored 68 books and founded two scientific journals: Prostate Cancer and Prostatic Diseases and Trends in Urology and Men's Health. He has also been an associate editor of the British Journal of Urology International.

In The Prostate: Small Gland Big Problem, one section was written by Clive Turner, who had undergone a radical prostatectomy himself and subsequently counselled other men considering the same option. In his textbook Men's Health, dedicated to premature death in men, particularly his father, he, his brother Mike Kirby and colleague Culley C. Carson III, attempt to address the gender gap in mortality. His book Fast facts: Prostate Cancer entered its tenth edition in 2020.

=== Books ===
- Kirby, Roger S. (17 November 2003). An Atlas of Erectile Dysfunction. Taylor & Francis. ISBN 978-1-84214-241-7.
- Kirby, Roger S.; Taylor, Claire (2005). Your Guide to Prostate Cancer. Hodder Arnold. ISBN 978-0-340-90620-0.
- Kirby, Roger S.; Partin, Alan W.; Feneley, Mark; Parsons, J. Kellogg (13 January 2006). Prostate Cancer: Principles and Practice. Taylor & Francis. ISBN 978-1-84184-458-9.
- Kirby, Roger S. (October 2006). The Prostate: Small Gland Big Problem. Health Press Limited. ISBN 978-1-903734-89-6.
- Kirby, Roger; Mundy, Tony (1 June 2007). Succeeding as a hospital hoctor: 3rd edition. Karger Medical and Scientific Publishers. ISBN 978-1-903734-79-7.
- Kirby, Roger S., ed. (2009). Men's health (3rd ed.). New York, NY: Informa Healthcare. ISBN 978-0-415-44733-1.. Co-edited with Carson C. Cully III, Michael Kirby and Adrian White
- Dasgupta, Prokar; Kirby, Roger S. (19 October 2011). ABC of Prostate Cancer. John Wiley & Sons. ISBN 978-1-4443-4691-6.
- Kirby, Roger S.; Patel, Manish I. (2017). Fast facts: Prostate cancer (Ninth ed.). Abingdon, UK: Health Press. ISBN 978-1-910797-37-2.

=== Articles ===
- Studies of the neurogenic bladder, Annals of the Royal College of Surgeons England, (A summary of a Hunterian Lecture delivered at the Royal College of Surgeons of England, 4 September 1986), Vol. 70, No. 5. (1988), pp. 285–288
- "Urethro-vesical dysfunction in progressive autonomic failure with multiple system atrophy", co-authored with Clare Fowler, John Gosling and Roger Bannister, Journal of Neurology, Neurosurgery, and Psychiatry, Vol. 49, (1986), pp. 554–562
- Kirby, Roger; Kirby, Michael; Carson, Culley; Fitzpatrick, John M. (March 2012). "The Trouble with Men". BJU International. 109 (6): 821–822. doi:10.1111/j.1464-410X.2012.10985.x. ISSN 1464-4096. PMID 22360803.
- "Richard Turner-Warwick" British Journal of Urology International (2014). (With Christopher Chapple)
- "A tale of four prostates". Trends in Urology and Men's Health, March/April 2013 (With Damian Hanbury, John Anderson and Sean G. Vesey)

=== News ===
- "Portrait of a Prostate UK supporter". 16 March 2009
- "UK Prostate Charities Merge". British Journal of Urology International, First published: 29 August 2012. (With Owen Sharp, Paul Forster, and Jonathan Waxman)
- "Are you ready to go to prison on a manslaughter charge?". British Journal of Urology International (2014)
- Five ways to stop men dying from prostate cancer. The Telegraph, 2 February 2018
- "Surge in prostate cancer referrals following Stephen Fry's diagnosis - Trends in Urology & Men's HealthTrends in Urology & Men's Health". trendsinmenshealth.com. Archived from the original on 16 July 2019.

== See also ==
- Centre for policy research on men and boys
