= Clare Fowler =

British emeritus professor of uro-neurology

Clare Fowler CBE
- Education: Middlesex Hospital Medical School
- Occupation: Physician
- Known for: Fowler's syndrome; Botox injections for overactive bladders; Creating the specialty uro-neurology
- Medical career
- Field: Urology and neurology
- Institutions: Middlesex Hospital; National Hospital for Neurology and Neurosurgery; Institute of Neurology, University College London
- Sub-specialties: Uro-neurology
- Research: Clinical neurophysiology
- Awards: St Peter's Medal (2010)

Clare Fowler CBE is an English physician and academic who created the subspecialty of uro-neurology, a medical field that combines urology and neurology. This work was done at the Institute of Neurology, University College London, where she is an emeritus professor.

Early in her career, she worked at the Middlesex Hospital and then the National Hospital for Neurology and Neurosurgery, Queen's Square, London, and carried out research in the field of clinical neurophysiology, looking at how nerves work to control the muscles used to control passing urine, work that formed the basis of Fowler's future contributions to continence issues in people with neurological conditions. Her name is given to Fowler's syndrome, a potentially treatable condition in which young women experience urinary retention. With colleagues, she disproved that these women's symptoms were primarily psychological or hysterical and showed that a significant proportion of them could be treated using a type of electrical stimulation therapy, sacral neuromodulation.

In 1987, she established the Department of Uro-Neurology and led trials looking at treatments for urinary retention in women, sildenafil in men with multiple sclerosis and sexual dysfunction, as well as treatments for the symptoms of severe overactive bladders. She assisted with establishing botox detrusor injections as a treatment for people with overactive bladders who did not improve with usual medications.

In 2001, she became professor of Uro-Neurology, and was awarded the British Association of Urological Surgeons's (BAUS) St Peter's Medal in 2010. In 2012 she received the award of Commander the British Empire for services to Uro-neurology.

Her book Pharmacopoeia Londinensis 1618 and its descendants, was published by the Royal College of Physicians in 2018.

== Early life and education ==
Clare Fowler was educated at Wycombe Abbey school, Buckinghamshire, while her parents worked in Bolivia, where her father was a tin ore smelter. She gained admission to study medicine at the Middlesex Hospital Medical School (later merged with University College), and graduated in 1973.

== Career ==
=== Fowler's syndrome ===
Early in her career, while working for neurologist Pamela Margaret Le Quesne at the Middlesex, she met the then surgical research registrar Roger Kirby, and together they published research articles on how nerves work to control the muscles used to control passing urine, work that formed the basis of Fowler's future contributions to continence issues in people with neurological conditions and earned Kirby an MD. In 1986 they disproved the belief that retention of urine in young women was primarily a psychological or hysterical disorder. By measuring electromyographical signals from the urethral sphincter in these women, they demonstrated that some had a neurophysiological disorder and showed that sacral neuromodulation, a type of electrical stimulation therapy was effective in a significant proportion of them. The condition came to be known as Fowler's syndrome, and is named for her. She later showed that some of these women had associations with hormone imbalances and polycystic ovaries. The response to sacral neuromodulation was impressive and more than two-thirds of these women could pass urine successfully five years after treatment. However many have needed repeated surgery.

=== The National ===
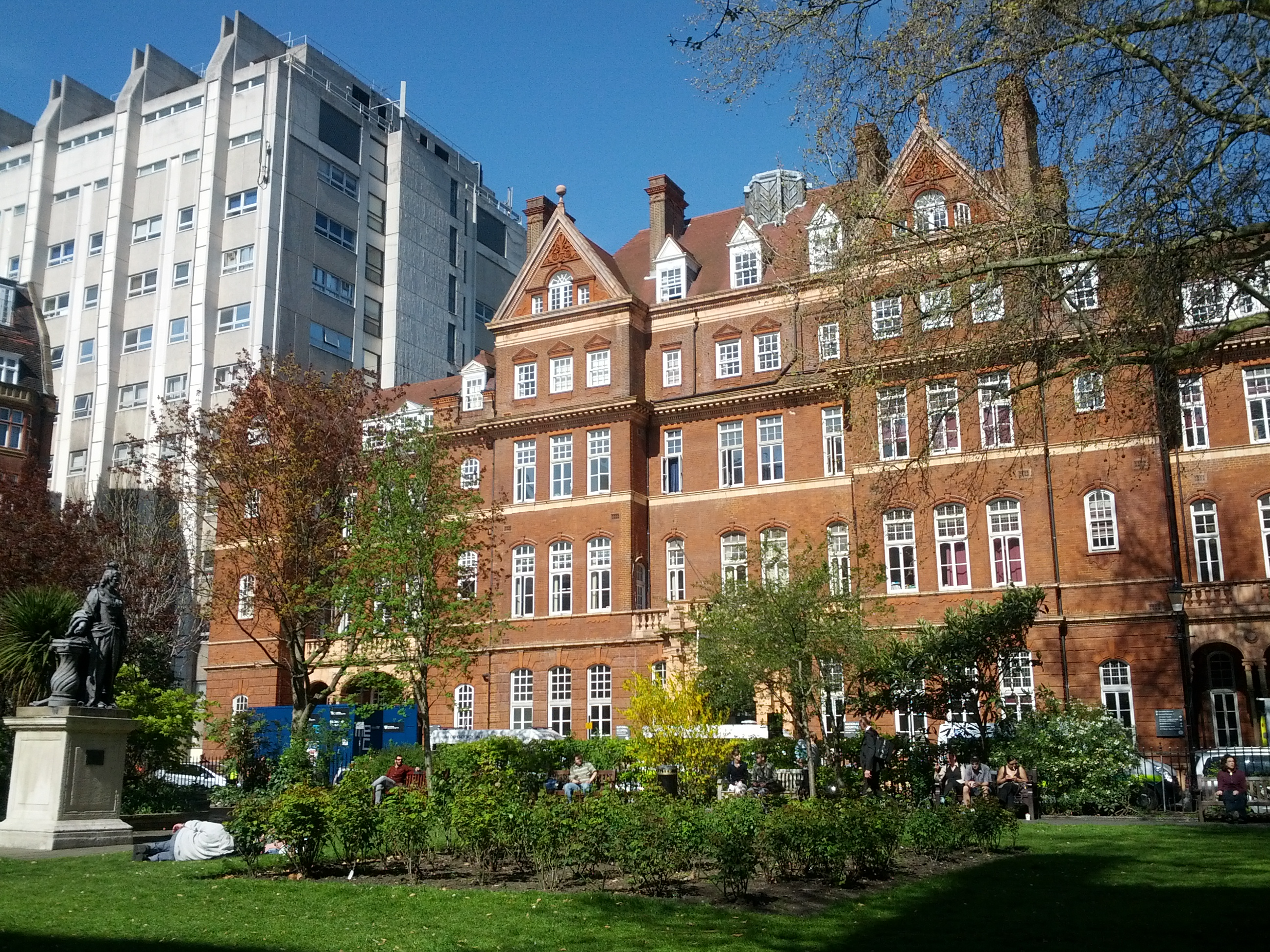
UCL Queen Square Institute of Neurology (left) and the National Hospital for Neurology and Neurosurgery (right) in Queen Square, London

In 1976, Fowler took up an appointment as senior house officer at the National Hospital for Neurology and Neurosurgery, Queen's Square, London, (also known as "The National"), where she gained further experience in clinical neurophysiology, looking at the motor and sensory nerve mechanisms of the bladder. Here she worked with neurologists Roman Stefan Kocen, Sir Roger Bannister and Christopher Joseph Earl. Following the advice of Roger William Gilliatt she completed her masters in neurophysiology from University College London, where she also studied laboratory computing and worked with the LINC-8. After a combined part-time consultant post in clinical neurophysiology at the Middlesex and St Bartholomew's Hospital, The National asked her to replace a retiring urologist and appointed her consultant to look after people with conditions such as multiple sclerosis and Parkinson's disease who had bladder problems. At the time, continence issues in people with neurological conditions was not as well understood. A limited control of bladder function was achieved using antimuscarinic medications and self-catheterisation.

In 1987 she established the Department of Uro-Neurology at The National, and with several research fellows, led trials looking at treatments for urinary retention in women, and sildenafil in men with multiple sclerosis and sexual dysfunction. With her former research fellow Prokar Dasgupta, they were first in the UK to use Botox injections, using a flexible cystoscope, as a treatment for people with overactive bladders who did not improve with usual medications. Her work has also included looking at capsaicin instillation into the bladder in managing urinary incontinence due to an overactive bladder. Capsaicin did not receive a licence for treatment, but Botox did.

Fowler is credited with creating the subspecialty of uro-neurology, and became professor of uro-neurology in 2001.

== Retirement ==
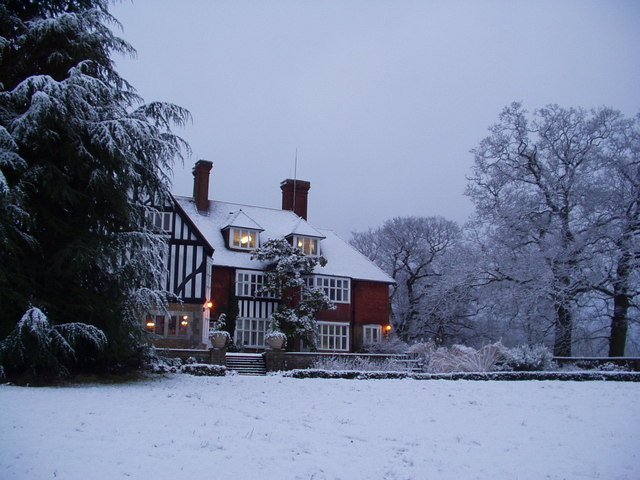
Merrist Wood

In 2015 she retired, and is emeritus professor of urology at the Institute of Neurology, University College London. Following retirement she took up botany and keeps a garden in Surrey. She spent some time at Merrist Wood studying horticulture, obtaining the Royal Horticultural Society diploma in horticulture in 2015. She now opens her garden (as Clare Bevan) under the ngs scheme - see garden website www.bridgeendcottage.co.uk. Her book Pharmacopoeia Londinensis 1618 and its descendants, on the origins of the Pharmacopoeia Londinensis which evolved into the British Pharmacopoeia, was published in 2018.

In 2018 she was licensed as a Lay Minister in the Diocese of Guildford and serves at All Saints', Ockham in Surrey. In 2021 she was awarded a BA Honours in Theology and Ministry, by University of Durham (as Clare Bevan).

== Awards and honours ==
In 2010 she was awarded the St Peter's Medal by the British Association of Urological Surgeons. In 2012, she received the Commander of the British Empire.

== Selected publications ==
- C. J, Fowler; T. J., Christmas; Cr, Chapple; H. F., Parkhouse; R. S., Kirby; H. S., Jacobs (3 December 1988). "Abnormal Electromyographic Activity of the Urethral Sphincter, Voiding Dysfunction, and Polycystic Ovaries: A New Syndrome?". BMJ. 297 (6661): 1436–1438. doi:10.1136/bmj.297.6661.1436. PMC 1835186. PMID 3147005.
- Apostolidis, Apostolos; Dasgupta, Prokar; Fowler, Clare J. (1 April 2006). "Proposed Mechanism for the Efficacy of Injected Botulinum Toxin in the Treatment of Human Detrusor Overactivity". European Urology. 49 (4): 644–650. doi:10.1016/j.eururo.2005.12.010. ISSN 0302-2838. PMID 16426734.
- Fowler, Clare J.; Griffiths, Derek; de Groat, William C. (June 2008). "The neural control of micturition". Nature Reviews Neuroscience. 9 (6): 453–466. doi:10.1038/nrn2401. ISSN 1471-0048. PMC 2897743. PMID 18490916.
- Pharmacopoeia Londinensis 1618 and Its Descendants - 500 Years of Medicine. Royal College of Physicians of London (2018)

== See also ==
- List of recipients of the St Peter's Medal
