= Ben Challacombe =

British urological surgeon (born 1973)

Ben Challacombe FRCS
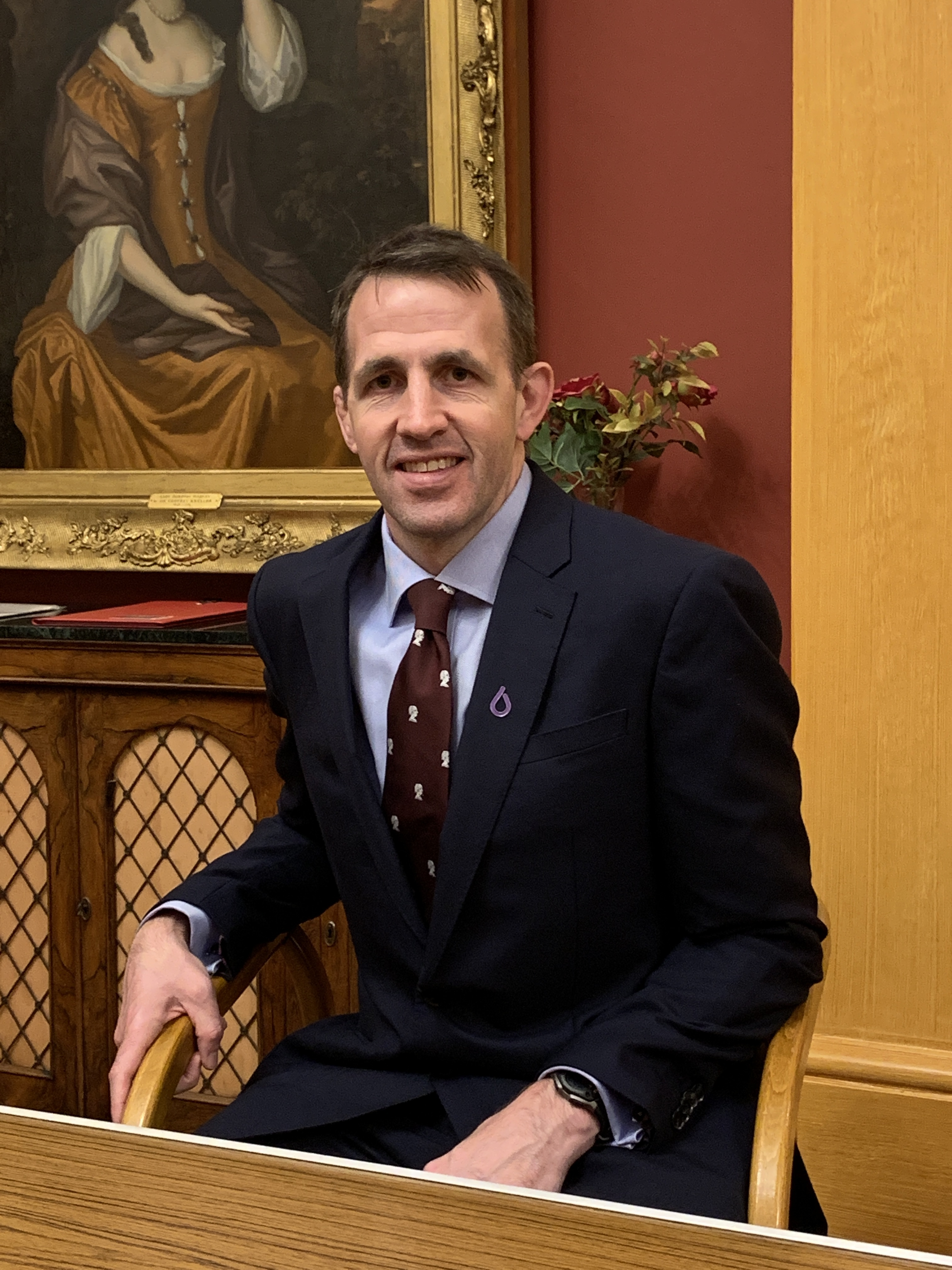
- Ben Challacombe (Hunterian Society 2019)
- Born: Benjamin James Challacombe; 1973 (age 52–53); Greenwich, London, England
- Education: United Medical and Dental Schools of Guy's and St Thomas' Hospitals
- Occupation: Urological surgeon
- Known for: Robotic nephrectomy and prostatectomy
- Relatives: Stephen Challacombe
- Medical career
- Profession: Surgeon
- Institutions: Guy's & St Thomas' Hospitals; The Prostate Centre, London
- Research: da Vinci robotic surgery
- Awards: Rowan Nicks UK and Ireland Scholarship from the Royal Australasian College of Surgeons (2009); British Association of Urological Surgeons Golden Telescope award (2019); Edwin Stevens Lecture (2021)

Benjamin James Challacombe FRCS (born 1973) is a British professor of urology at Guy's & St Thomas' Hospitals, and at King’s College London, who specialises in the treatment of kidney and prostatic disease using robotic surgery. In 2005, he was part of the team that published the results of a randomised controlled trial of human versus telerobotics in the field of urology and renal transplant, one of the first of its kind.

After qualifying in medicine from Guy's and St Thomas' and completing junior surgical posts, he completed a da Vinci robotic Fellowship at the Royal Melbourne Hospital in 2009. In 2010, he was appointed consultant and pursued a surgical career in the procedure of removing part of a kidney using robotics and proceeded to regularly perform these, robotic radical prostatectomies and Holmium laser prostatectomies.

In 2016, he performed the UK's first live broadcast of the robotic removal of part of a kidney. In 2019, he told his surgical story alongside that of Stephen Fry. In the same year he was awarded the British Association of Urological Surgeons (BAUS) Karl Storz Harold Hopkins Golden Telescope award.

He has written or co-written over 230 peer-reviewed articles and 30 book chapters, and has been an active fundraiser for The Urology Foundation and Prostate Cancer UK.

== Early life ==
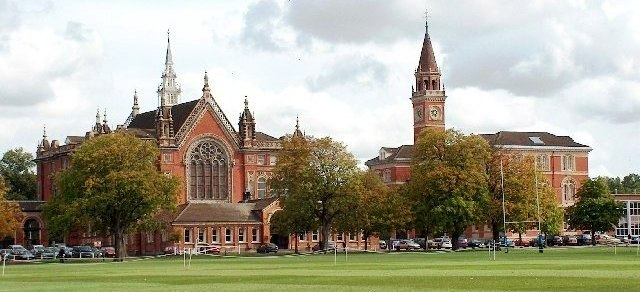
Dulwich College, College Road, Dulwich

Ben Challacombe was born in 1973 in Greenwich, London, to professor of oral medicine Stephen Challacombe and general practitioner Tina Challacombe.

Between 1986 and 1991, he attended Dulwich College before opening a year as a 2nd Lieutenant in 29 Commando Regiment, Royal Artillery and then studying medicine at United Medical and Dental Schools of Guy's and St Thomas' Hospitals from 1992. He qualified in 1998.

== Career ==
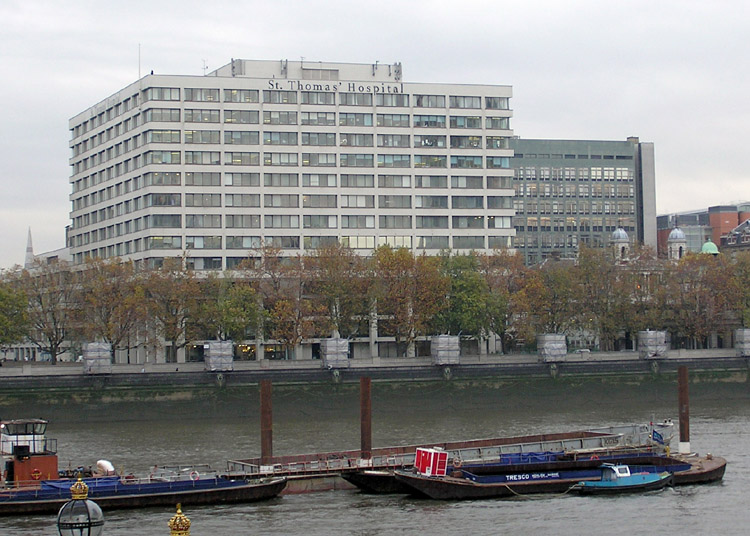
St Thomas' Hospital

Between August 1998 and January 1999, he completed general medicine house posts at Worthing Hospital in the specialties of cardiology, gastroenterology, and elderly care. Subsequently, he worked for six months in the specialty of urology at Guy's Hospital, followed by six months in accident and emergency at St Thomas' Hospital and then became anatomy demonstrator to professor Harold Ellis. From June 2000 to October 2002, he held a number of surgical posts at Guy's and St Thomas' including the specialties of breast surgery, endocrinology, colorectal surgery, orthopaedics and urology, before spending eighteen months as a research fellow in urology for Prokar Dasgupta and R. Tiptaft.

In 2002, Challacombe began his masters in surgery at the University of London, gaining the degree in 2007 with a thesis titled “Telemedicine, Telerobotics and their Implications for Urology and Renal Transplantation”, a randomised controlled trial of human versus telerobotics, one of the first of its kind.

In 2004, he gained a place on the surgical South Thames Training Scheme, which placed him at the William Harvey Hospital, the Kent and Sussex Hospital, and then at the Darent Valley Hospital. He gained his FRCS (Urology) in 2008.

=== Fellowship ===
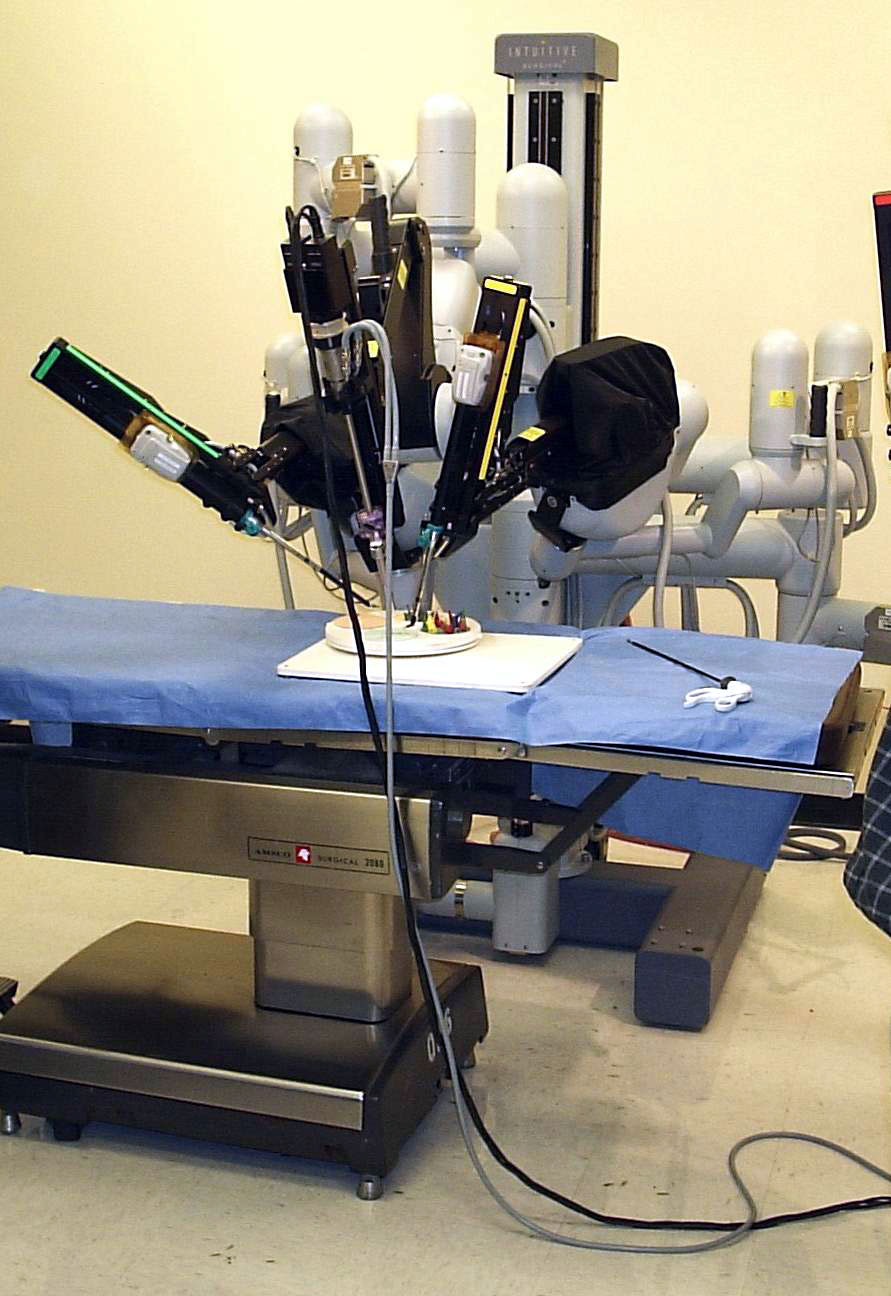
Laproscopic Surgery Robot

As a surgical trainee in 2009, he was awarded the Rowan Nicks UK and Ireland Scholarship from the Royal Australasian College of Surgeons. He focussed on the da Vinci robotics with professor Anthony J. Costello at the Royal Melbourne Hospital in Australia. Later in 2009, he returned to The Royal Marsden Hospital under professor Christopher Woodhouse.

In 2010, he was appointed to Guy's and St Thomas' Hospital, shortly before being also appointed as surgeon at the Prostate Centre, London, and pursued a surgical career in the procedure of removing part of a kidney using robotics and proceeded to regularly perform these. He has since also regularly performed robotic radical prostatectomies and Holmium laser (HoLEP) prostatectomies. Other robotic surgery he has been involved in include nephroureterectomy, pyeloplasty and adrenalectomy. He teaches robotics and HoLEP and runs the robotic fellowship programme at Guy's and St Thomas' NHS Foundation Trust and teaches at the British and European Annual Urology meetings. In this respect, he has encouraged his students to spend some time playing wii.

=== World robotic surgery education ===
In 2016, as part of "world robotic surgery education", he performed the first live broadcast of a robotic partial nephrectomy in the UK, while listening to music. This helped him manage his time and track his surgical procedure by giving crucial auditory cues, reporting that "you basically have a maximum 30-minute window to remove a cancerous tumour from a kidney. The traditional way is for someone to call out the time, but that's distracting and quite stressful. With the music, I know where I am without that".

In this live webcast, he used a playlist comprising Coldplay's "Viva la Vida" and "Princess of China", followed by "So Far Away" by Dire Straits and then "Burn" by Ellie Goulding and "Just Give Me a Reason" by Pink. The sixth and last song on the playlist was "Stop Crying Your Heart Out" by Oasis, the onset of which would have indicated that time was over: "I don't ever want to hear the Oasis song", he reported.

=== Prostate surgery ===
Since 2018, he has increasingly taken over the work of prostate surgeon Roger Kirby. In 2019, Challacombe told his surgical story of treating prostate cancer alongside the same story told by his patient, actor and author Stephen Fry. It was published in Nature Reviews Urology in an article titled "Both sides of the scalpel: the patient and the surgeon view".

In 2020, he was interviewed by his cousin Rupert Cox, on testicular cancer and the treatment of England and British Lions rugby player Alex Corbisiero. During the COVID-19 pandemic in London, he described his robot as having been furloughed, eventually returning to work when the one tonne machine was transferred from Guy's to an adjacent private facility where surgery could recommence.

== Awards ==
In 2009, Challacombe was awarded the Rowan Nicks UK and Ireland Scholarship from the Royal Australasian College of Surgeons, offered annually to a young surgeon with potential leadership skills.

In 2019, he was awarded the British Association of Urological Surgeons (BAUS) Karl Storz Harold Hopkins Golden Telescope award, an annual prize awarded to a young consultant member of the BAUS for their achievements. In May 2021, he delivered the Edwin Stevens Lecture.

== Charity work ==
Challacombe is on the board of trustees for The Urology Foundation charity and lectures for the charity Prostate Cancer UK.

In 2008, he swam the English Channel in a relay to raise funds for Prostate Cancer UK.

He is a trustee of Penguins Against Cancer, the charity arm of Guy's, King's and St Thomas' RFC.

== Selected publications ==
=== Articles ===
- Challacombe, Ben; Patriciu, Alexandru; Glass, Jonathan; Aron, Monish; Jarrett, Tom; Kim, Fernando; Pinto, Peter; Stoianovici, Dan; Smeeton, Nigel; Tiptaft, Richard; Kavoussi, Louis (January 2005). "A randomized controlled trial of human versus robotic and telerobotic access to the kidney as the first step in percutaneous nephrolithotomy". Computer Aided Surgery. 10 (3): 165–171. doi:10.3109/10929080500229561. ISSN 1092-9088. PMID 16321914.
- Murphy, Declan G.; Challacombe, Ben J.; Elhage, Oussama; O'Brien, Tim S.; Rimington, Peter; Khan, Mohammad Shamim; Dasgupta, Prokar (1 September 2008). "Robotic-assisted Laparoscopic Radical Cystectomy with Extracorporeal Urinary Diversion: Initial Experience". European Urology. 54 (3): 570–580. doi:10.1016/j.eururo.2008.04.011. ISSN 0302-2838. PMID 18423976.
- Fry, Stephen; Challacombe, Ben (March 2019). "Both sides of the scalpel: the patient and the surgeon view". Nature Reviews Urology. 16 (3): 153–158. doi:10.1038/s41585-019-0153-y. ISSN 1759-4820. PMID 30778197. S2CID 66879962.

=== Books ===
- The Big Prostate. Springer, London, 2017. ISBN 9783319647043 (Co-editor)
- The Management of Small Renal Masses: Diagnosis and Management. Springer, 2018. ISBN 9783319656564 (Co-editor)
