= Edwin Stevens Lecture =

Series of lectures

The Edwin Stevens Lecture, also known as the Edwin Stevens Lecture for the Laity or Stevens Lecture, are a series of lectures founded and named for Arthur Edwin Stevens in 1970. Stevens was a successful entrepreneur and member of the library section of the Royal Society of Medicine (RSM), London, where the lecture is held every year. In 1967, a committee to discuss "lectures for the laity" was formed. In 1970, at the request of the then president of the History of Medicine Society, Sir Terence Cawthorne, Stevens donated £2,000 a year for the first three years, as a trial. The lectures became successful and Stevens donated a further £50,000 in 1973 and made the lecture series permanent.

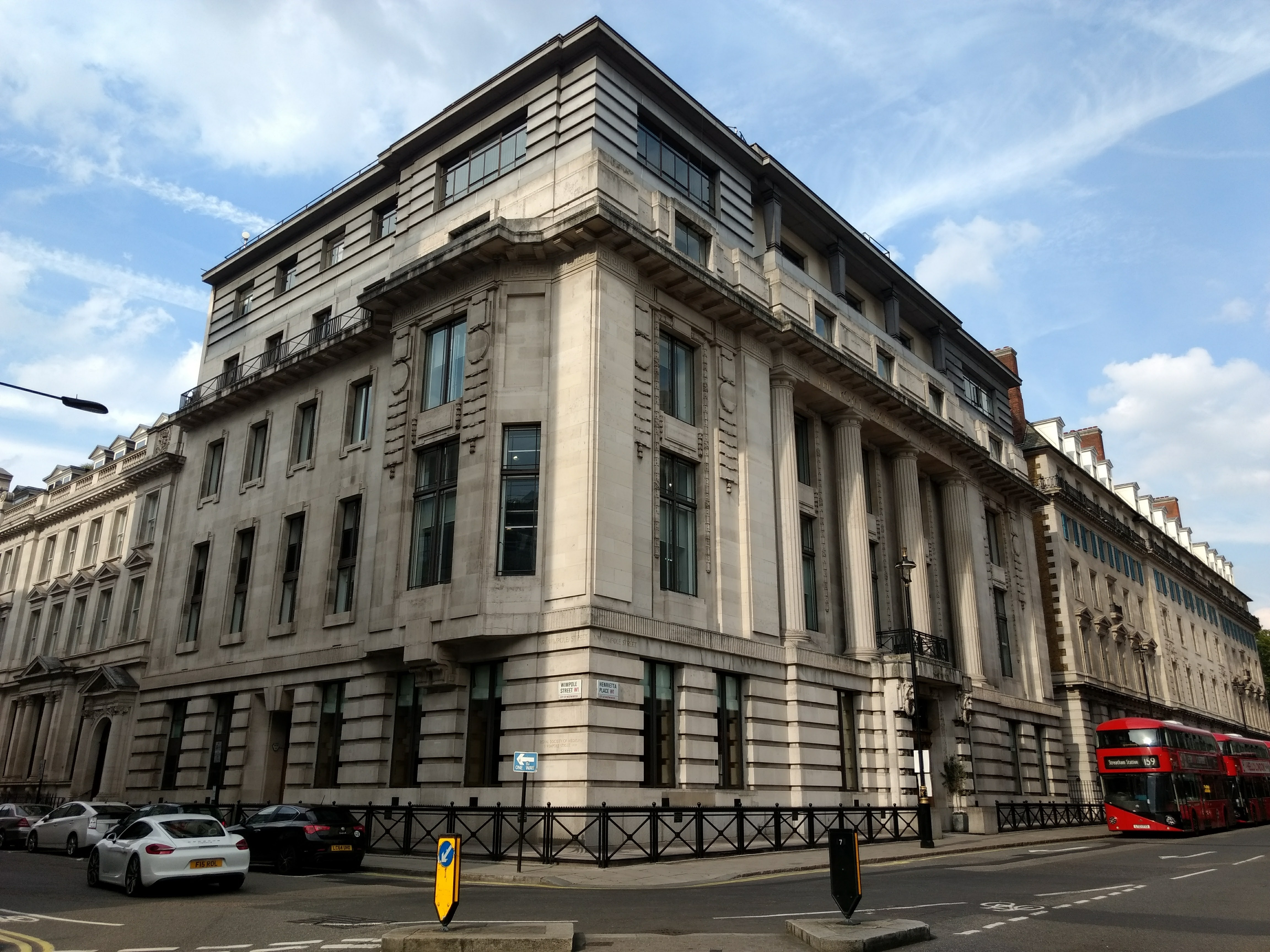
Royal Society of Medicine 1 Wimpole Street

== Lectures ==
=== 1970-1980 ===
Years	Lecture title	Lecturer	Comments	Image
1970	'The one and the many': two lectures on ethical questions relating to the practice of medicine.	Sir Michael Woodruff	This was the first lecture in the series.	
1971	'Unreason in an age of reason'	Griffith Edwards		
1972	'The Disease of Crime - Punishment Or Treatment?'	Sir Robert Mark and Peter Scott		Peter scott (1954)
1973	'The Doctor's Role - Truth or Mystery ? [and] The Doctor's Place in a Permissive Society'	Arnold Goodman, Baron Goodman	MP Leo Abse took part in the subsequent discussion.	
1974	'Doctors and patients'	Solly Zuckerman, Baron Zuckerman		
1975	'Air pollution and public health – a personal appraisal'	Patrick J. Lawther	Professor of Environmental and Preventive Medicine, University of London He set up the Medical Research Council (MRC) air pollution unit at St Bartholomew's Hospital Medical School.	
1976	'On dying and dying well. Moral and spiritual aspects'	Donald Coggan DD, Archbishop of Canterbury	Coggan was invited by the then president of the RSM, Gordon Wolstenholme. Coggan said in the lecture that it is "misleading to extend the term euthanasia to cover decisions not to preserve life by artificial means when it would be better for the patient to be allowed to die." The lecture subsequently made headlines in the Daily Telegraph, Guardian, The Times, Daily Mail, Daily Express, Daily Mirror, Church Times, Universe, Catholic Herald and The Sunday Times.	
1977	'The future of our society'	Jo Grimond		
1979	'Health at any price'	Kingman Brewster Jr.		
1980	'Law, ethics and authority'	Quintin Hogg, Baron Hailsham of St Marylebone		

=== 1981-1990 ===
Years	Lecture	Lecturer	Comments	Image
1981	'The Brandt report - restoring the health of the world economy'	Edward Heath		
1982	'The hope of the disabled person'	Gp Capt Leonard Cheshire VC & Sue Ryder, Baroness Ryder of Warsaw		
1983	'Thoughts of a doctor's son'	Cardinal Basil Hume		
1985		Oliver Franks, Baron Franks		
1986	'Cancer: a preventable disease?'	Sir Richard Doll	In 1987, Doll's lecture was mentioned at a house of commons sitting discussing the association of smoking and lung cancer, when Edwina Currie quoted Doll as saying "scientists should take care to distinguish the advice they give that is based on incontrovertible evidence (such as the harmful effects of tobacco, alcohol and asbestos) from that which is based on their assessment of the most likely interpretation of the evidence such as the benefit from increasing the consumption of dietary fibre, vegetables and fruit."	
1987	'AIDS'	Sir Donald Acheson	Introduced by Sir Gordon Robson, president of the RSM.	
1988	'The implications of genetic engineering for medical practice'	Professor Sir David Weatherall		
1989	'Medical negligence - the mounting dilemma'	John Havard	Being secretary of the British Medical Association and having qualified in law and medicine, Havard spoke on medical negligence.	
1990	'Medical mumbo jumbo - traditional healers protecting their status'	Anne, Princess Royal		

=== 1991-2000 ===
Years	Lecture	Lecturer	Comments	Image
1991	'Ecological hazards of climate change'	Sir Crispin Tickell		
1992		Lady Justice Butler-Sloss		
1993	'Euthanasia: Death, Dying and the medical duty'	Ludovic Kennedy	In his lecture he quoted the Pope's views and described it as 'medieval in its thinking and barbaric in its lack of compassion'.	
1994	'Mental illness and Society'	Anthony Clare		
1995		Lord Justice Balcombe		
1996	'The defeat of deafness'	Lord Ashley of Stoke	In his mid-forties following an ear operation, he became deaf.	
1998	'Human reproductive cloning- a look at the arguments against it and a rejection of most of them'	Professor Raanan Gillon	At the time, head of the medical ethics unit of the Imperial College School of Medicine, Gillon evaluated the then popular rejection of human reproductive cloning.	
2000		Sir Kenneth Calman		

=== 2001-2010 ===
Years	Lecture	Lecturer	Comments	Image
2001	'Safe surgery – the press, the politicians and the public'	Sir Barry Jackson		
2002	'Advising on the Care of Patients with dementia'	Professor David Jolley		
2003	'Assisted Reproduction or Forced Conception: Where draw the line?'	Professor Robert Winston, Lord Winston		
2004	'The origins of the NHS and future development '	Michael Portillo MP		
2005	'Genetic Fingerprinting'	Professor Sir Alec Jeffreys		
2006	'Law, ethics and the genome'	Helena Kennedy, Baroness Kennedy of The Shaws		
2007	'Mishaps in Medicine: will we ever learn?'	Professor Sir John Lilleyman		
2008	'The Medical Profession in the 21st Century'	Professor Graeme Catto		
2009	'Fairness in end of life care: quality, quantity or both?	Professor Ilora Finlay, Baroness Finlay of Llandaff		
2010	'Balancing cost and effectiveness in healthcare'	Professor Sir Michael Rawlins		

=== 2011-2025 ===
Years	Lecture	Lecturer	Comments	Image
2011	'Pancreatic Cancer: challenges and hopes'	Professor Robin Williamson		
2012	'Dementia'	Professor Martin Rossor		
2013	'A journey through your prostate'	Professor Roger Kirby		
2014	'The Future of Cardiovascular Medicine'	Professor Anders Hamsten		
2015	'Bio-Materials: an Armamentarium in Surgical Reconstruction, Innovations and Solutions'	Professor Alan C. Roberts		
2016	'Medical Ethics'	Professor Sir Terence Stephenson		
2017	'Skin cancer and sun addiction'	Dr Christopher Rowland Payne		
2018	'Harnessing the gastrointestinal tract'	Rachel Batterham		
2019	'The NHS and Society'	Sir Simon Stevens		
2021	'The future of surgical robotics, the future is surgical robotics?'	Ben Challacombe		
2022				
2023		Matthew Taylor		
2024				
2025		Sir James Mackey		
