= Declan G. Murphy =

Irish urologist

Declan G. Murphy FRACS, FRCS
- Born: Portumna, County Galway
- Education: NUI Galway
- Occupation: Surgeon
- Medical career
- Profession: Urological surgeon
- Field: Genitourinary oncology
- Institutions: Guy's and St Thomas' NHS Foundation Trust; Peter MacCallum Cancer Centre
- Research: Robotic surgery for prostate cancer
- Website: Official website

Declan G. Murphy is an Irish urologist who is director of the unit for genitourinary oncology and robotic surgery at the Peter MacCallum Cancer Centre in Melbourne, Australia, professor at the Sir Peter MacCallum Department of Oncology at the University of Melbourne, and associate editor of the British Journal of Urology International. In 2010 he introduced robotic surgery for urology to the public sector health services in Victoria, Australia.

Murphy's early career began in Dublin before taking up training in the specialty of urology in England. After completing a fellowship in laparoscopic and robotic surgery in Melbourne, he returned to London and was appointed consultant urologist at Guy's and St Thomas' Hospital in 2009. The following year he moved to Australia and took up a consultant post at the Peter MacCallum Cancer Centre.

He is a regular blogger on topics pertaining to men's health. In May 2018, his tweet became a popular meme after he demonstrated the use of the da Vinci robot in performing surgery on a grape, with the purpose of introducing children to the topic.

In 2019 he was appointed full professor. The following year he was senior author on the team that published their results on an imaging technique that uses gallium-labelled prostate specific membrane antigen in a PET/CT scanner (PSMA PET-CT), for detecting the early spread of prostate cancer.

== Early life and education ==
Declan Murphy is from Portumna, County Galway, in the West of Ireland, where his father and sister are general practitioners. In 1996 Murphy graduated in medicine from NUI Galway and subsequently completed early medical training at the University Hospital Galway, Mullingar Hospital, Meath & Adelaide Hospital, Our Lady of Lourdes Hospital and St. James's Hospital, Dublin, before moving to England to take up training in the specialty of urology, first in Brighton, Worthing and Redhill, and then at Guy's and St Thomas' NHS Foundation Trust, London.

== Career ==
In 2006 he was awarded the FRCS Royal College of Surgeons in Ireland Urol and subsequently completed a one-year fellowship under Anthony J. Costello in laparoscopic and robotic urology in Melbourne, which changed his opinion of operating on the prostate using a robot. Between January 2009 and December 2009, he was consultant in urology at Guy's and St Thomas', London. He is a reviewer and is on the editorial board for urology related publications including European Urology, Nature Reviews Urology, The Journal of Urology, the BJU International, Prostate Cancer and Prostatic Diseases, and the Journal of Sexual Medicine.

=== Robotic surgery ===
In 2010 he returned to Melbourne and introduced robotic surgery for urology to the public sector health services in Victoria, when he took up a consultant post at the Peter MacCallum Cancer Centre, where he later became director of robotic surgery. In 2011 he was awarded the FRACS.

In 2015 he performed a live robotic prostatectomy which was broadcast as part of the "World Robotic Surgery Event". By 2019 he had performed near 2000 robotic prostatectomies.

=== Social media ===
He is a regular blogger on topics pertaining to men's health. His blog on skills of a surgeon in robotics in 2016 titled "It's not about the machine, stupid", won the 2018 British Journal of Urology International's social media award for most commented upon blog.

In May 2018, to demonstrate to children how robotic procedures were carried out with precision, he successfully performed surgery on a grape using a da Vinci robot. A few months later, his twitter feed was picked up and the resulting social media attention led the story to become a popular meme.

=== Prostate cancer detection ===
He has been an advocate of early PSA testing, and has argued that it saves lives through early detection of prostate cancer. In 2013 he led the Melbourne Consensus Statement on early detection of prostate cancer. In 2018 he revealed in the Medical Journal of Australia , his findings that three-quarters of men with low-grade prostate cancer who should have been getting regular checks, did not comply with surveillance recommendations.

In 2020, the year after he was appointed full professor, he was senior author on the team that published their results on an imaging technique that uses gallium-labelled prostate specific membrane antigen in a PET/CT scanner (PSMA PET-CT), for detecting the early spread of prostate cancer.

=== COVID-19 ===
During the COVID-19 pandemic in 2020, Murphy chaired the Victorian COVID-19 Cancer Network and highlighted concerns about decreasing diagnoses of prostate cancer due to social distancing measures.

== Personal and family ==
He is married to Lisa and they have two sons.

== Selected publications ==
- Murphy, D.; Challacombe, B.; Rane, A. (October 2005). "Laparoscopic reconstructive urology". Journal of Minimal Access Surgery. 1 (4): 181–187. doi:10.4103/0972-9941.19265. ISSN 0972-9941. PMC 3004120. PMID 21206661..
- Murphy, Declan G.; Costello, Anthony J. (1 September 2008). "High prostatic fascia release or standard nerve sparing? A viewpoint from the Royal Melbourne Hospital". Journal of Robotic Surgery. 2 (3): 181–185. doi:10.1007/s11701-008-0102-x. ISSN 1863-2491. PMID 27628257. S2CID 30522663.
- Murphy, D. G.; Sweeney, C. J.; Tombal, B. (July 2017). ""Gotta Catch 'Em All", or Do We? Pokemet Approach to Metastatic Prostate Cancer". European Urology. 72 (1): 1–3. doi:10.1016/j.eururo.2017.02.036. PMID 28283344.. (
- Murphy, Declan G.; Loeb, Stacy; Basto, Marnique Y.; Challacombe, Benjamin; Trinh, Quoc-Dien; Leveridge, Mike; Morgan, Todd; Dasgupta, Prokar; Bultitude, Matthew (1 July 2014). "Engaging responsibly with social media: the BJUI guidelines". British Journal of Urology International. 114 (1): 9–11. doi:10.1111/bju.12788. hdl:2027.42/107573. ISSN 1464-4096. PMID 24774415. S2CID 207090850.
- Hofman, Michael S.; Lawrentschuk, Nathan; Francis, Roslyn J.; Tang, Colin; Vela, Ian; Thomas, Paul; Rutherford, Natalie; Martin, Jarad M.; Frydenberg, Mark; Shakher, Ramdave; Wong, Lih-Ming; Taubman, Kim; Ting Lee, Sze; Hsiao, Edward; Roach, Paul; Nottage, Michelle; Kirkwood, Ian; Hayne, Dickon; Link, Emma; Marusic, Petra; Matera, Anetta; Herschtal, Alan; Iravani, Amir; Hicks, Rodney J.; Williams, Scott; Murphy, Declan G.; et al. (proPSMA Study Group Collaborators) (22 March 2020). "Prostate-specific membrane antigen PET-CT in patients with high-risk prostate cancer before curative-intent surgery or radiotherapy (proPSMA): a prospective, randomised, multicentre study". The Lancet. 395 (10231): 1208–1216. doi:10.1016/S0140-6736(20)30314-7. ISSN 0140-6736. PMID 32209449. S2CID 214609500..
