= Lord Stevens =

Lord Stevens or Baron Stevens may refer to:

- David Stevens, Baron Stevens of Ludgate (born 1936)
- John Stevens, Baron Stevens of Kirkwhelpington (born 1942)
- Simon Stevens, Baron Stevens of Birmingham (born 1966)
