= The Urology Foundation =

Charity organization

- Formation: 1995
- Founders: Roger Kirby; John M. Fitzpatrick
- Legal status: Charity
- Purpose: To prevent, treat, and cure urology diseases
- Headquarters: 1-2 St Andrew's Hill, London EC4V 5BY
- Origins: British Journal of Urology International (BJUI); British Association of Urological Surgeons (BAUS)
- Methods: Financing research; Supporting training
- Fields: Diseases of the male and female urinary-tract system and the male reproductive organs
- President: Roger Kirby
- Chairman: Mary Garthwaite
- Chief Executive: Rebecca Porta
- Ambassador: Stephen Fry
- Secessions: British Association of Urological Surgeons; National Institute for Health Research
- Website: Official website
- Formerly called: The British Urological Foundation

The Urology Foundation (TUF) is a charity that works across the UK and Ireland with the aim of improving the knowledge and skills of surgeons who operate on diseases of the male and female urinary-tract system and the male reproductive organs and funds research to improve outcomes of all urological conditions and urological cancers.

Its work is solely supported by donations. By financing research, it develops diagnostic tests and minimally invasive procedures for urological diseases. By supporting training, it improves surgical skills, and by awarding grants it provides opportunities for surgeons to travel to various parts of the world and practise new techniques.

TUF was founded under the banner of 'The British Urological Foundation' in 1995 by urologists Roger Kirby and John M. Fitzpatrick, and introduced robotic surgical training for urologists in 2011. It holds teaching sessions to prepare final year trainees for consultant posts and works in collaboration with the Fulbright Commission to grant 'The Fulbright Urology Foundation Award', for a research assignment in an academic higher education institution in the States. Projects granted funding by TUF have included those concentrating on cancers of the prostate, bladder and kidney, sexual dysfunction, urinary incontinence, BPH and prostatitis.

TUF organises a number of fundraising and awareness events, including their 'Annual Urology Awareness Month' and charity bike rides. Its contributions have included funding into the research of a tool developed to predict a person's personalised prognosis following a diagnosis of prostate cancer.

== History ==
The British Urological Foundation was founded in 1995 by urologists Roger Kirby and John M. Fitzpatrick. Funding came from the British Journal of Urology International (BJUI) and the British Association of Urological Surgeons (BAUS), and its work has been solely supported by donations. It later became known as The Urology Foundation.

2003 marked the beginning of educational visits to the Cleveland Clinic, Ohio, US, and eight years later, robotic surgical training for urologists was promoted by TUF.

In its first 15 years, projects granted funding by TUF have included those concentrating on cancers of the prostate, bladder and kidney, sexual dysfunction, urinary incontinence, BPH and prostatitis.

== Purpose ==
TUF aims to raise awareness of urological diseases, and works across the UK and Ireland with the purpose of improving the knowledge and skills of surgeons who operate on diseases of the male and female urinary-tract system and the male reproductive organs and funds research to improve outcomes of all urological conditions and urological cancers.

TUF's objectives are:

To advance, promote, encourage, develop and improve the study and knowledge of urology, urological surgery and the general knowledge of science and medicine and all matters relating to the progress and development of that branch of science and medicine, and for that purpose to fund, aid, maintain and endow scholarships, fellowships, chairs and bursaries and generally to assist in the funding, instruction and support of persons and institutions engaged or involved in urological research work

The method used to achieve their objective is by developing diagnostic tests and minimally invasive procedures for urological diseases by financing research, by improving surgical skills by supporting training and by providing opportunities for surgeons to travel to parts of the world and practise new techniques and treatments by supporting them with grants.

== Members ==
Patrons of TUF include Handel Evans, Rosemary Macaire, Jane MacQuitty, Steven Norris and Sir Ranulph Fiennes, who in 2014, in support of TUF, gave a lecture at the Royal Geographical Society titled "Living Dangerously". Having been diagnosed with prostate cancer in 2007, he underwent a five-hour robotic prostatectomy at the Royal Marsden Hospital before reaching the summit of Mount Everest in 2009. The proceeds of his lecture about his expeditions were donated to TUF.

Trustees of TUF include Baroness Wyld and Ben Challacombe, and partners of TUF include:

- British Association of Urological Surgeons
- Association of Medical Research Charities
- British Association of Urological Nurses
- National Institute for Health Research
- Specialist Urological Registrars' Group

Since 2011, 'The Urology Foundation Alumni' has existed as a forum for grant beneficiaries to share information and knowledge and have a role in the development of the charity.

== Training ==
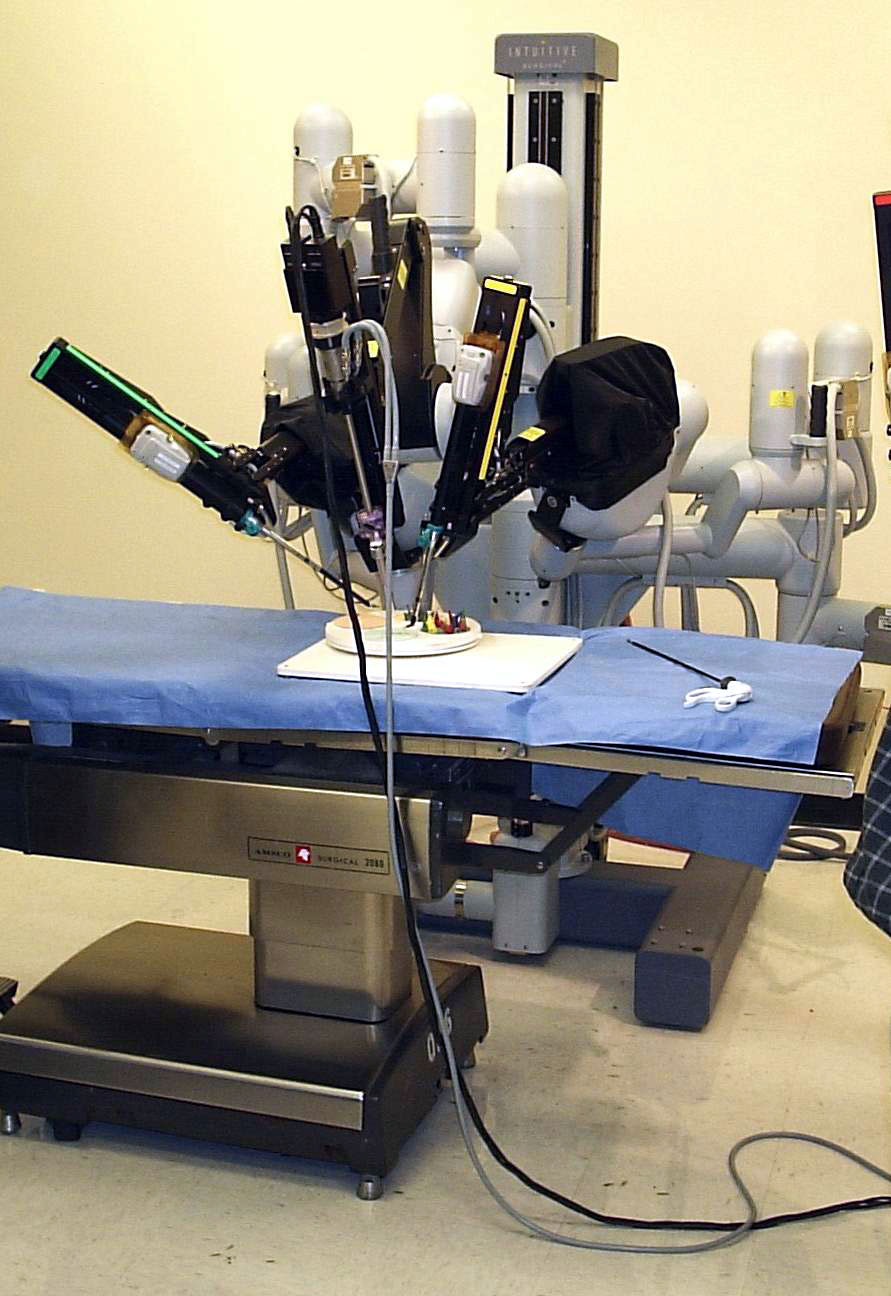
A laparoscopic robotic surgery machine

TUF has sent surgeons to a number of specialist centres around the world to train in new technologies. These have included training in cystectomy and creation of a neobladder in Mansoura in Egypt.

Teaching of robotic laparoscopy was initially arranged in 2003 with Cleveland Clinic's surgeon Indy Gill and later, robotic training programmes included working with Gill at the University of Southern California, Joseph "Jay" A. Smith at the Vanderbilt University School of Medicine, Nashville and Mani Menon at the Henry Ford Hospital, Detroit, US.

The Freeman Hospital in Newcastle, is one of the UK's robotic training centres.

Preparing final year trainees for consultant posts have been taught through TUF-arranged interview skill courses.

== Fundraising ==
In 2005, the BAUS awarded Roger Kirby the St Peter's Medal for his fundraising activities for TUF.

In 2014, the annual 'Urology Awareness Month' campaign was launched and has subsequently taken place every September, with the aim of increasing awareness of all urological diseases, not only cancers.

For more than 10 years funds have been raised in the 'Hike for Hope' programme. This included in 2017 almost 40 people who cycled 500 kilometres (310 mi) through Vietnam and Cambodia to raise funds for TUF. TUF activities have been supported by Stephen Fry. In the same year and for the same purpose, surgeon Michal Smolski from Burnley hospital cycled 300 miles in two days from London to Amsterdam.

In 2018, its fifth year, the theme was "We have heard of the prostate, but do we know what it is?" TUF ran this campaign with the support of Stephen Fry, to dispel taboos surrounding cancers of the genitourinary tract. The following year, just prior to an interview conducted by BBC panorama journalist, Jane Corbin, Fry publicly thanked TUF:

My run-in with prostate cancer taught me about the importance of charities who are working hard on behalf of patients like myself. Thanks to the work The Urology Foundation (TUF) did long before my diagnosis, my experience of prostate cancer was far less fraught than it could have been. My excellent surgeon was trained through TUF and so it's a pleasure to be joining them for what I'm sure will be a riotous evening.

In December 2018, for the purpose of fundraising, four men from Cornwall, with a supporting tweet from Stephen Fry, set off in a 28-foot (8.5 m) ocean rowing boat with a mission to row 3,000 miles (4,800 km) and cross the Atlantic Ocean, from La Gomera, in the Canary Islands. They were successful and arrived in Antigua 43 days later on 24 January 2019. Two of the seamen subsequently gave TUF's 'Guest Lecture'.

== Awards ==
Senior Clinical Researcher in Robotic Surgery and Urology at the Nuffield Department of Surgical Sciences, Prasanna Sooriakumaran, was awarded the TUF medal for "Best Research Proposal" of 2016.

TUF works in collaboration with the Fulbright Commission to present The Fulbright Urology Foundation Award. Covering projects concerned with urological diseases, the grant allows academics, urologists or specialist nurses to follow a three- to nine-month research assignment in an academic higher education institution in the States.

== Achievements ==
By its twentieth year, research into improving urology care had received more than £3 million from TUF.

A significant change in the way that urological surgery is performed in the West Midlands resulted from the work of urologist Peter Cooke, who had previously received robotic training in 2012 via TUF, at Vanderbilt University Medical Center in Nashville, US.

In 2018, TUF carried out a survey of how often British men checked their testicles, which showed that only half of them did so in the last year. As a result, TUF established #tufnutsTuesdays, a campaign to encourage men to examine their testicles on the first Tuesday of every month.

A special service for people with kidney cancer was developed at the Royal Free Hospital, London, by surgeons whose training was funded by TUF.

TUF contributed funding into the research of 'PREDICT Prostate', a tool launched in 2019 and developed to predict a person's personalised prognosis following a diagnosis of prostate cancer.
