= Quesne =

Quesne is a surname. Notable people with the surname include:

- Charles Thomas Le Quesne (1885–1954), British Liberal Party politician and barrister
- Ferdinand Le Quesne (1863–1950), British army surgeon and recipient of the Victoria Cross
- Giffard Le Quesne Martel (1889–1958), British Army officer
- Martin Le Quesne (1917–2004), British diplomat, ambassador to Mali and Algeria and high commissioner to Nigeria
- Pamela Margaret Le Quesne (1931–1999), British neurologist
- Julien Quesne (born 1980), French golfer

== See also ==
- Duquesne (disambiguation)
- Le Quesne, a commune in northern France
- Skylark DuQuesne, a science fiction novel by American writer E. E. Smith
