= John M. Fitzpatrick =

- Born: John Michael Fitzpatrick; 15 July 1948
- Died: 14 May 2014 (aged 65)
- Education: Gonzaga College; University College Dublin
- Occupations: Emeritus professor of surgery at the University College Dublin School of Medicine & Medical Science; Head of Research at the Irish Cancer Society
- Medical career
- Profession: Urologist
- Institutions: St. Peter’s Hospitals; Meath Hospital; St. James’ Hospitals; Trinity College Dublin; Mater Misericordiae Hospital; University College Dublin
- Awards: St Peter's Medal

John M. Fitzpatrick (15 July 1948 – 14 May 2014) was an Irish urologist, emeritus professor of surgery at the University College Dublin School of Medicine & Medical Science and Head of Research at the Irish Cancer Society.

Fitzpatrick's early childhood was spent in Ballsbridge, Dublin, and he was educated at Gonzaga College where he learnt history and literature from Jesuits, following which he entered the University College Dublin to study medicine. In 1975 he became a Fellow of the Royal College of Surgeons in Ireland. From 1977 to 1981, he worked at the St. Peter's Hospitals and the Institute of Urology in London, where he watched emerging robotic surgery and the then new minimally invasive surgical techniques.

In 1981 Fitzpatrick returned to Dublin to take up the post of consultant urologist and senior lecturer in urology in the Meath and St. James’ Hospitals and Trinity College Dublin. The following year he was appointed as a consultant urologist and chairman of the Department of Surgery at the Mater Misericordiae Hospital and professor of surgery at University College Dublin.

== Early life ==
John Michael Fitzpatrick was born on 15 July 1948, one of three sons of a prominent lawyer and a mother who was a historian. His early childhood was spent in Ballsbridge, Dublin, and he was educated at Gonzaga College where he learnt history and literature from Jesuits.

Before going to University College Dublin, Fitzpatrick travelled with a teenage friend to Egypt, Jordan and Syria and at the age of 19 visited Czechoslovakia, just before the Prague Spring of 1968. He won a scholarship to study the greats at Oxford University, but chose to go to medical school in Dublin instead.

== Early career ==
In 1971 Fitzpatrick qualified in medicine from the University College Dublin (UCD) and completed his internship at St. Vincent's University Hospital. In 1975 he became a Fellow of the Royal College of Surgeons in Ireland and received his master's degree in surgery at UCD the following year. Subsequently, he moved to the UK where he watched emerging robotic surgery and the then new minimally invasive surgical techniques. From 1977 to 1981, he worked in the field of interventional radiology, men's health and urodynamics at the St. Peter's Hospitals and the Institute of Urology in London, interrupted by a brief research placement in Mainz, Germany. In London, he was mentored by John Wickham and his contemporaries included Anthony J. Costello and Christopher Woodhouse.

== Later career ==
In 1981 Fitzpatrick returned to Dublin to take up the post of consultant urologist and senior lecturer in urology in the Meath and St. James’ Hospitals and Trinity College Dublin. The following year he was appointed as a consultant urologist and chairman of the Department of Surgery at the Mater Misericordiae Hospital and professor of surgery at University College Dublin. He was among the first in Ireland and Britain to perform surgical removals of the prostate if prostate cancer was still confined to the gland.

Fitzpatrick was emeritus professor of surgery at the University College Dublin School of Medicine & Medical Science and Head of Research at the Irish Cancer Society.

He wrote more than 100 books chapters, authored more than 280 peer-reviewed journal articles and edited 18 textbooks. For ten years he served as editor in chief of the British Journal of Urology International and was elected president of the British Association of Urological Surgeons and of the Irish Society of Urology. He helped create The Urology Foundation in 1994. In 2004 he was awarded the BAUS St Peter's Medal.

== Personal life ==
Fitzpatrick has two brothers, a lawyer and a general practitioner.

== Death ==
Fitzpatrick was taken ill in his own gym at home, and died on 14 May 2014 from a subarachnoid haemorrhage.

== Selected publications ==
- Fitzpatrick, John M. (April 2006). "The natural history of benign prostatic hyperplasia". BJU International. 97 Suppl 2: 3–6, discussion 21–22. doi:10.1111/j.1464-410X.2006.06097.x. ISSN 1464-4096. PMID 16507045.
- Fitzpatrick, John M.; Bellmunt, Joaquim; Fizazi, Karim; Heidenreich, Axel; Sternberg, Cora N.; Tombal, Bertrand; Alcaraz, Antonio; Bahl, Amit; Bracarda, Sergio; Lorenzo, Giuseppe Di; Efstathiou, Eleni (1 June 2014). "Optimal management of metastatic castration-resistant prostate cancer: Highlights from a European Expert Consensus Panel" (PDF). European Journal of Cancer. 50 (9): 1617–1627. doi:10.1016/j.ejca.2014.03.010. ISSN 0959-8049. PMID 24703899.
