= Prostate Cancer and Prostatic Diseases =

- Discipline: Urology, oncology
- Language: English
- Edited by: Stephen Freedland

Publication details
- History: 1997-present
- Publisher: Nature Publishing Group
- Frequency: Quarterly
- Impact factor: 5.554 (2020)

Standard abbreviations
- ISO 4: Prostate Cancer Prostatic Dis.

Indexing
- ISSN: 1365-7852 (print); 1476-5608 (web)

Links
- Journal homepage; Online archive

Prostate Cancer and Prostatic Diseases is a quarterly peer-reviewed medical journal covering all aspects of prostatic diseases, in particular prostate cancer, the subject of intensive basic and clinical research worldwide. The journal also reports on new developments being made in diagnosis, surgery, radiotherapy, drug discovery and medical management. Prostate Cancer and Prostatic Diseases is of interest to surgeons, oncologists and clinicians treating patients and to those involved in research into diseases of the prostate. The journal covers the three main areas - prostate cancer, male LUTS and prostatitis. It was established in 1997 with Roger Kirby as the founding editor, with Judd Moul becoming co-editor alongside Kirby in 2003. It is published by Springer Nature Publishing Group. The outgoing editor-in-chief is Stephen J. Freedland (Cedars-Sinai Medical Center) and will be replaced by Cosimo De Nunzio (Sapienza University of Rome) from 1 January 2022. According to the Journal Citation Reports, the journal has a 2020 impact factor of 5.554, ranking it 16th out of 90 journals in the category "Urology & Nephrology" and 77th out of 242 journals in the category "Oncology".
