= Trends in Urology and Men's Health =

Trends in Urology & Men's Health
- Discipline: Urology
- Language: English
- Edited by: Roger Kirby

Publication details
- History: 2010–present
- Publisher: John Wiley & Sons
- Frequency: Bimonthly

Standard abbreviations
- ISO 4: Trends Urol. Men's Health

Indexing
- ISSN: 2044-3730 (print); 2044-3749 (web)

Links
- Journal homepage

Trends in Urology & Men's Health is a peer-reviewed academic journal of urology and men's health, aimed at urologists, HIV consultants, hospital doctors, selected GPs and specialist nurses, covering subjects that particularly affect men, including cardiovascular disease, urological, sexual and mental health issues. Its editor-in-chief is Roger Kirby, editor is Mike Kirby, and US editor is Culley Carson. It is published six times a year by Wiley.
