= Anthony J. Costello =

Australian urologist

Anthony J. Costello FRACS, FRCSI
- Born: Melbourne, Australia
- Known for: Robotic surgery
- Medical career
- Institutions: St Vincent's Hospital; Royal Melbourne Hospital
- Awards: Member of the Order of Australia (2015)

Anthony James Costello is an Australian urologist. He served as head of the department of urology at the Royal Melbourne Hospital, Australia. He established the first robotic prostate cancer surgery programme in Australia and published the first series of men who had laser surgery for benign prostate enlargements.

Costello has been an advocate for PSA testing in men and robotic surgery for prostate removal in treating prostate cancer. Based on microdissections of cadavers, he described the anatomy of the nerves near the prostate, significant for preserving erectile function.

== Early life and education ==
Anthony Costello was born in St Vincent's Hospital, Melbourne. His father was an Australian Air Force pilot and general practitioner who practiced from home, where his mother stayed with their eight children. His ancestors had emigrated from Ireland in the mid 1800s.

Between 1957 and 1966 he attended Xavier College, and then studied at Newman College, a residential college of the University of Melbourne. He gained his medical degree in 1972 from the University of Melbourne, Medical School.

== Career ==
In 1981 Costello completed a fellowship at MD Anderson Cancer Center in Houston, under the supervision of urological surgeon Douglas E. Johnson. Subsequently, he spent five years back in Melbourne and then took a sabbatical as a returning fellow in Houston in 1989, when he developed an interest in emerging technologies relating to prostate cancer. He then returned to Melbourne in 1990 and became head of the unit at St. Vincent's.

He established an international urologic-oncology fellowship programme. In 1992, he published the first series of men who had laser surgery for benign prostate enlargements using the Nd:YAG laser. In 1999, he was appointed head of urology at the Royal Melbourne Hospital, where, in 2001, he established a laboratory for prostate cancer research at its Department of Surgery. He also helped establish the Victorian Prostate Cancer Foundation.

In 2003, he began using the da Vinci Surgical robot for prostate surgery at his private practice in Epworth Hospital in Richmond, and established the first robotic prostate cancer surgery programme in Australia.

Costello has been an advocate for PSA testing in men and robotic surgery for prostate removal in treating prostate cancer. He popularised the use of an endoscopic closure device for raising the prostate during robotic assisted radical prostatectomy. Based on a series of microdissections of cadavers, he described the anatomy of the nerves near the prostate in detail, significant for preserving erectile function. With his colleagues, he has questioned the neuroanatomy relating to the prostate gland and felt that the nerves located within the "veil of Aphrodite" (veil of tissue) mainly provide the nerve supply to the prostate, rather than to the corpora cavernosa for sexual function.

Urologists he trained include Ben Challacombe and Declan G. Murphy.

== Awards and honours ==
Costello is an honorary fellow of the Royal College of Surgeons in Ireland, a member of the American Association of Genitourinary Surgeons, and on the board of the Australian Prostate Centre.

In 2015, he became a member of the Order of Australia “for significant service to medicine in the field of urology as a clinician, administrator and author, to cancer research, and to medical education”. The following year he became the first honorary life member of Irish Association of Urologists.

In 2017 he was awarded the St Pauls Medal by the British Urological Association.

== Personal and family ==
As a student Costello had been captain of football and swimming teams and later took up running. Of his siblings, four became doctors, one a judge and one a teacher.

In his 30s, he owned a vineyard and made wine. He is married and has grandchildren.

== Selected publications ==
- Costello, Anthony J.; Brooks, Matthew; Cole, Owen J. (1 November 2004). "Anatomical studies of the neurovascular bundle and cavernosal nerves". BJU International. 94 (7): 1071–1076. doi:10.1111/j.1464-410X.2004.05106.x. ISSN 1464-4096. PMID 15541130. S2CID 35070487.
- Murphy, D. G.; Costello, A. J. (September 2008). "High prostatic fascia release or standard nerve sparing? A viewpoint from the Royal Melbourne Hospital". Journal of Robotic Surgery. 2 (3): 181–185. doi:10.1007/s11701-008-0102-x. ISSN 1863-2483. PMID 27628257. S2CID 30522663.
- Murphy, Declan G.; Agarwal, Dinesh; Costello, Anthony J. (1 February 2009). "Anterior retraction of the prostate during robotic-assisted laparoscopic radical prostatectomy using the closure device". BJU International. 103 (4): 558–562. doi:10.1111/j.1464-410X.2009.08393.x. ISSN 1464-4096. PMID 19187352. S2CID 46485867.
- Costello, Anthony (2019). "Why a robot took my bladder". ANZ Journal of Surgery. 89 (12): 1536. doi:10.1111/ans.15574. hdl:11343/286657. ISSN 1445-2197. PMID 31769182. S2CID 208298527.
- Costello, Anthony J. (March 2020). "Considering the role of radical prostatectomy in 21st century prostate cancer care". Nature Reviews Urology. 17 (3): 177–188. doi:10.1038/s41585-020-0287-y. ISSN 1759-4820. PMID 32086498. S2CID 211234353.
