= Arthur Edwin Stevens =

British philanthropist

(Arthur) Edwin Stevens CBE (17 October 1905 – 29 January 1995) was a Welsh inventor who designed the world's first wearable electronic hearing aid. He was also a philanthropist, becoming a major benefactor to the Royal Society of Medicine, and to Jesus College, Oxford, at which he had studied between 1927 and 1929.

== Life ==
Stevens was born at Panteg, Monmouthshire. He was educated at West Monmouth School, University College, Cardiff (obtaining a Bachelor of Science degree in physics in 1927) and Jesus College, Oxford (obtaining a further bachelor's degree in Natural Sciences in 1929). He started working for the Radio Corporation of America and then as a salesman for a manufacturer of electrical hearing aids. As he considered that the products he was selling were inadequate, he set up his company (Amplivox) to make better hearing aids. He designed the world's first wearable electronic hearing aid: the microphone went on the lapel, the amplifier went in the jacket pocket and the earphone was small enough not to need a headband. Eventually, as technology improved, Stevens created a hearing aid that was small enough to fit completely in the outer ear. His hearing aids were used by Winston Churchill (who was Stevens's personal client), amongst others. He also designed audiometers and acoustic equipment such as protective communication headsets and helmets. He also had a comprehensive collection of aids to hearing, spanning 400 years. Stevens married Kathleen James in 1933; they had three sons, one of whom is Lord Stevens of Ludgate. Stevens died on 29 January 1995.

== Charitable works ==
He stepped down as chairman of Amplivox in 1975 and thereafter devoted himself to philanthropy. He supported the Royal Society of Medicine, founding the Edwin Stevens Lectures for Laity in 1970. He was made an Honorary Fellow of the Society in 1981. He inaugurated the Princess Alice Hospice in Esher, Surrey (where he lived for many years). He was also a major benefactor of Jesus College. He was a major contributor to the campaign to raise money to build further accommodation for students in the Third Quad of the college to mark the four hundredth anniversary of the college in 1971. He then donated further sums to enable student flats to be built by the college at a site in north Oxford, on the Woodstock Road. The flats were named Stevens Close in his honour and were opened by Queen Elizabeth II in 1976. He also made further gifts towards the building of further student flats at the college sportsground and to building a meeting and conference room in the main college buildings. He was made an Honorary Fellow of the college in 1973. In 1979, Stevens was appointed a Commander of the Order of the British Empire (CBE), "For charitable services, especially to Jesus College, University of Oxford." He was awarded an honorary doctorate by the University of Wales in 1984.
