= Griffith Edwards =

British psychiatrist (1928–2012)

James Griffith Edwards CBE (3 October 1928 – 13 September 2012) was a British psychiatrist.

Edwards was born on 3 October 1928 in India and received his D.M. from Balliol College, Oxford. His research focused on the study and treatment of alcohol and other drug dependence and related aspects of addictions.

He was director of the Medical Research Council-funded Addiction Research Unit from 1968 until his retirement from King's College London. He also established the UK National Addiction Centre in London and was its first Chair and Director. He was Editor-in-Chief of the journal Addiction for twenty-five years. In 1971 he delivered the Edwin Stevens Lecture. Awards he received include the E.M. Jellinek Memorial Award in 1979 for his research on alcohol use disorders, and being made a Commander of the Order of the British Empire (CBE) in 1987 for his services to social science and medicine, among others.

Edwards wrote extensively on policy aspects of alcohol and other drug problems and promoted a balanced public health population-based approached to the tackling of alcohol and other drug problems. He wrote the original description of alcohol dependence and the terminology of dependence has become the global term adopted in international disease classification systems including the DSM and ICD classifications.

Edwards wrote on alcohol and other drugs for both professionals and academics, and for a general audience. His popular science books include Alcohol, The Worlds Favourite Drug, Matters of Substance: Drugs, and Why Everyone is a User. He also sole-authored in 1982 the first edition of the book The Treatment of Drinking Problems and contributed as an author, co-author, and advisor to its subsequent editions. After his death, the five other authors of the sixth edition renamed the book in his honour as Edwards' Treatment of Drinking Problems.

== Research and community development projects ==
Professor Edwards combined a career of developing research and knowledge on aspects of alcohol and drug problems with the promotion of community based actions. He supported the development of a broad structured response to alcohol and other drug problems, including appropriate and high quality medical and psychiatric services for such problems. Edwards conducted research and supported the development of new approaches to those who are homeless and also people in prison with alcohol problems. He was instrumental in supporting the establishment of the first Therapeutic Community for treatment of Drug Dependence, Phoenix House. In addition, he supported the development of community drug agencies in the late 1960s and was involved in the early work piloting community-based services for alcohol problems.

Along with Lady Ann Parkinson, he supported the founding of a charity originally called Action on Addiction in 1989. (This charity later merged with The Chemical Dependency Centre and Clouds House) to form a new larger charity, now also called Action on Addiction). Action on Addiction works to support treatment and aftercare, as well as the development of research and service innovation in Addictions. Through his interest in developing country issues and links with the World Health Organisation he strongly supported and encouraged projects to assist research and service development in resource poor settings.

Professor Edwards' academic work involved research in tobacco, alcohol and other drugs and has supported a training, research, treatment and policy approach that combines all substances that are addictive into a coherent theoretical framework. He has promoted an approach that combines the basic sciences of addiction, to the more applied and social sciences and sought to promote an evidenced based policy approach that is fully scientifically informed.

Edwards participated in multiple, international efforts to integrate the lessons of addiction research for policymakers, including the books Alcohol Policy and the Public Good and Drug Policy and the Public Good, both of which supported evidence-informed, humane, and balanced public policy towards addictive legal and illegal substances.

== Bibliography ==
- Edwards, G. (2026). Seeing Addiction: A Personal Memoir. London: Ubiquity Press.
- Edwards, G. (2005) Matters of substance drugs--and why everyone's a user NY: St. Martin's Press.
- Edwards, G. (2000). Alcohol: The World's Favorite Drug. NY: St. Martin's Press.
- Edwards, G. (1982). The Treatment Of Drinking Problems: A Guide For The Helping Professions (1st edition). London: Grant McIntyre.
- Edwards, G. and Gross, M.M. (1976). Alcohol dependence: provisional description of a clinical syndrome. British Medical Journal, 1, 1058–1061.
- Stockwell, T., Hodgson R., Edwards, G., Taylor, C. and Rankin, H (1979). The development of a questionnaire to measure severity of alcohol dependence. British Journal of Addiction 74, 79–87.
- Edwards, G. (1982). Cannabis: the question of psychiatric morbidity. In Report of the Expert Group on the Effects of Cannabis Use, pp. 40–47. London, Home Office.
- Edwards G., Brown, D., Oppenheimer, E., Sheehan, M., Taylor, C. and Duckitt, A. (1988). Long-term outcome for patients with drinking problems: the search for predictors. British Journal of Addiction, 83, 917–927.
- Edwards, G., Anderson, P., Babor, T.F., Casswell, S., Ferrence, R., Giesbrecht, N., Godfrey, C., Holder, H.D., Lemmens, P., Mäkelä, K., Midanik, L.T., Norström, T., Österberg, E., Romelsjö, A., Room, R., Simpura, J. & Skog, O-J (1994). Alcohol Policy and the Public Good. Oxford University Press, Oxford. Translation into Finnish, French, German, Norwegian, Portuguese, Russian, Spanish and Swedish: translation of short version into Italian and Hebrew.
