= Culley C. Carson III =

American physician

Culley Clyde Carson III
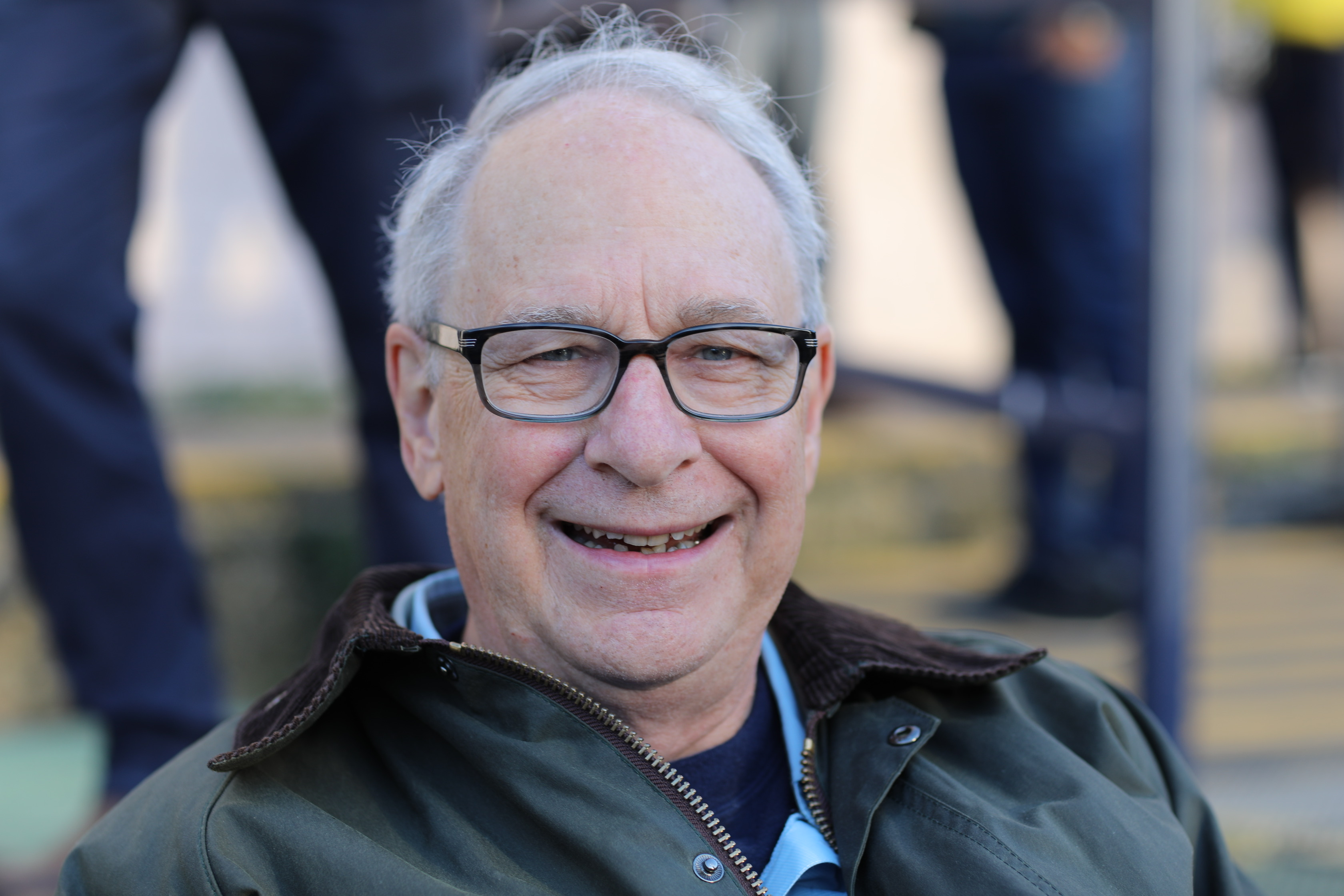
- Culley C. Carson III in 2018
- Born: February 1945 (age 81)
- Education: Trinity College; George Washington University School of Medicine
- Occupation: Urologist
- Medical career
- Institutions: University of North Carolina
- Research: Peyronie's disease; Penile implants; Erectile dysfunction
- Awards: St Paul's Medal

Culley Clyde Carson III (born 1945) is an American retired urologist who specializes in Peyronie's disease, penile implants and erectile dysfunction. After serving two years as a flight surgeon with the United States Air Force, he took on a urology residency at the Mayo Clinic and then taught at the Duke University Medical Center as an assistant professor, subsequently gaining full professorship.

He was later named John Sloan Rhodes and John Flint Rhodes Distinguished Professor within the Department of Urology at the University of North Carolina School of Medicine. Upon his retirement, he was granted emeritus status.

== Education and career ==
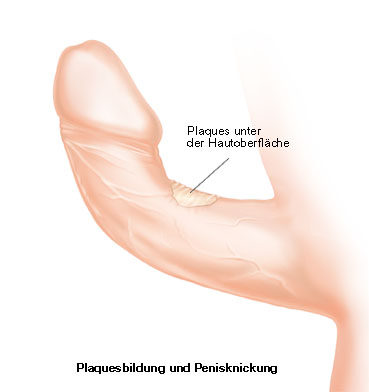
Dorsal deviation of the penis due to Peyronie's disease

Culley Clyde Carson III was born in February 1945 in Westerly, Rhode Island. After graduating from Trinity College in Connecticut, he studied at the George Washington University School of Medicine, where he received the Calvin Klopp Award for outstanding research. He then began his residency at Dartmouth Hitchcock Medical Center. Carson then served two years as a flight surgeon with the United States Air Force (USAF), after which he took on a urology residency and fellowship at the Mayo Clinic, Rochester Minnesota. Carson began his teaching career at the Duke University Medical Center, as an assistant professor. He was subsequently promoted to full professor, and left for the University of North Carolina School of Medicine, where he was later named John Sloan Rhodes and John Flint Rhodes Distinguished Professor within the Department of Urology. Carson was chief of the department between 1993 and 2010. Upon his retirement, he was granted emeritus status.

He has authored over 300 peer-reviewed articles and edited more than eight textbooks. He is the founding editor-in-chief of the Sexual Medicine Reviews journal and served through April 2014. Carson has been chief editor of Contemporary Urology and is an associate editor of Trends in Urology and Men's Health.

His research has focussed on erectile dysfunction, penile prostheses, and treatments for Peyronie's disease, where the penis curves upon erection.

In the third edition of his textbook Men's Health, ten years after the first edition. when he and his colleagues questioned why men die on average five years earlier than women, they attempt to address the gender gap and provide practical advice to general physicians and specialists.

== Honors and awards ==
In 1974, he became United States Air Force Flight Surgeon of the Year. In 2000, he was awarded the Royal Society of Medicine's book prize for his textbook Erectile Dysfunction, and in 2001 he won the Jesse H. Neal Award for editorial writing.

In 2011 Carson was awarded the Distinguished Contributor Award by the American Urological Association, of which he has been an active member, and the following year received their Brantley Scott Award.

He is a fellow of the Sexual Medicine Society of North America and was their past president in 2003. In 2014, he received their Lifetime Achievement Award and in the same year, he was awarded the St Paul's Medal from the Council of the British Association of Urological Surgeons. In 2015, the Massachusetts Medical Society awarded Carson its Men's Health Award. He has also held presidencies of the Society of University Urologists and the American Society for Men's Health.

== Selected publications ==
=== Books ===
- Endourology. Churchill Livingstone (1985). ISBN 9780443083679. With N. Reed Dunnick
- Textbook of Erectile Dysfunction. Taylor & Francis (1999). With Irwin Goldstein and Roger S. Kirby
- Urologic Prostheses: The Complete Practical Guide to Devices, Their Implantation and Patient Follow Up. Springer Science + Business Media (2002). ISBN 978-1-61737-242-1
- Key Clinical Trials in Erectile Dysfunction. Springer (2007). ISBN 978-1-84628-428-1.
- Management of Erectile Dysfunction in Clinical Practice. Springer (2007). ISBN 978-1-84628-399-4
- Men's Health. Routledge, London (2009). (3rd Edition). ISBN 9780415447331. Co-edited with Roger Kirby, Michael Kirby and Adrian White

=== Articles ===
- Carson, Culley C. (2009). "Surgery for Stuttering Priapism". Journal of Urology. 181: 449–450. doi:10.1016/j.juro.2008.11.052.
- Carson, Culley C. (2009). "Surgical Techniques: Penile Prosthesis for Cylinder Tip Malposition". The Journal of Sexual Medicine. 6: 2372–2375. doi:10.1111/j.1743-6109.2009.01443.x.
- Carson, CC (2014). "Government Regulation Can Be Helpful". Sex Med Rev. 2: 57–58. doi:10.1002/smrj.22. PMID 27784589.
- Carson, Culley C.; Levine, Laurence A. (2014). "Outcomes of surgical treatment of <scp>P</scp>eyronie's disease". BJU International. 113: 704–713. doi:10.1111/bju.12565..
- Carson, Culley C.; Sadeghi-Nejad, Hossein; Tursi, James P.; Smith, Ted M.; Kaufman, Gregory J.; Gilbert, Kimberly; Honig, Stanton C. (2015). "Analysis of the clinical safety of intralesional injection of collagenaseClostridium histolyticum(CCH) for adults with Peyronie's disease (PD)". BJU International. 116: 815–822. doi:10.1111/bju.13120.
