= Rowan Nicks =

New Zealand surgeon (1913–2011)

George Rowan Nicks OBE FRACS FRCS AO
- Born: 24 February 1913
- Died: 26 May 2011 (aged 98)

George Rowan Nicks (24 February 1913 - 26 May 2011) was a New Zealand surgeon.

The Rowan Nicks Fellowships and Scholarships are awarded in his name by the Royal Australasian College of Surgeons. Recipients include professor of urology, Ben Challacombe.

== Selected publications ==
- The Dance of Life: The Life and Times of an Antipodean Surgeon
