= Prokar Dasgupta =

Indian surgeon and academic

Prokar Dasgupta OBE FRCS HonFREng
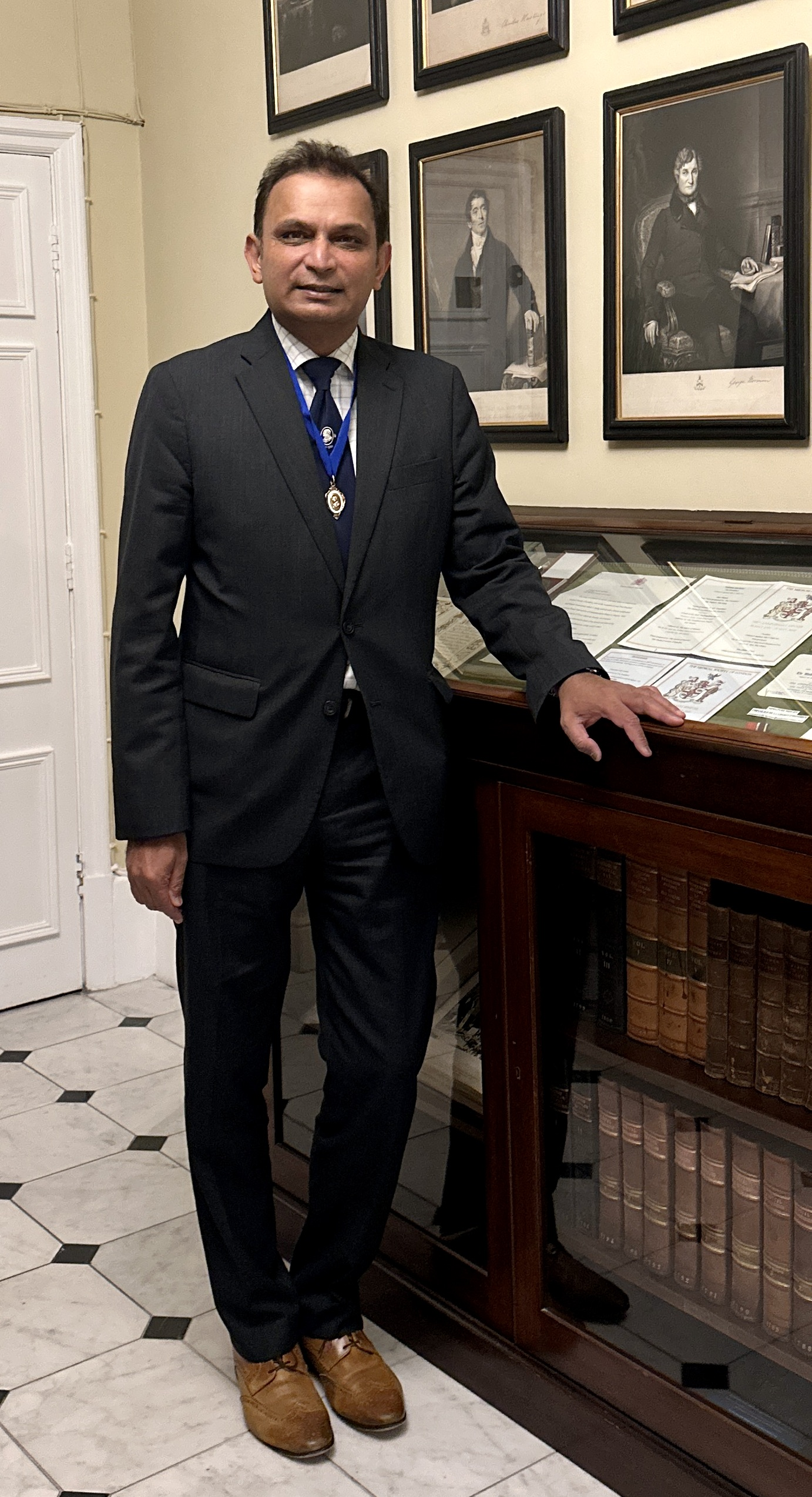
- Prokar Dasgupta at the Medical Society of London (2023)
- Born: Rourkela, Odisha, India
- Education: Medical College, Kolkata
- Known for: "Dasgupta technique"; Use of da Vinci robot; Robotic surgery in kidney transplantation
- Awards: Fellowship of King's College (2018); St Peter's Medal (2020); Padma Shri (2022)
- Scientific career
- Fields: Urology
- Workplaces: Guy's Hospital; King's College London
- Thesis: (2000)
- Academic advisors: Clare Fowler
- Website: Official website

Prokar Dasgupta OBE FRCS HonFREng is an Indian-born British surgeon and academic who is professor of surgery at the surgical academy at King's Health Partners, London, UK. Since 2002, he has been consultant urologist to Guy's Hospital, and in 2009 became the first professor of robotic surgery and urology at King's, and subsequently the chairman of the King's College-Vattikuti Institute of Robotic Surgery.

Early in his career, he was a medical research fellow to Clare Fowler at the National Hospital for Neurology and Neurosurgery, Queen's Square, where they developed an outpatient procedure for treating urinary incontinence in people with an overactive bladder that did not respond to usual medical treatment. They were the first in the UK to use this method of injecting Botox into the bladder wall using a flexible cystoscope, and it subsequently became known as the "Dasgupta technique".

In 2005, he led the team that used a da Vinci robot to perform one of the early keyhole operations to retrieve a kidney as part of a kidney transplant, in Britain. Ten years later, he successfully removed a cancerous tumour from a man's prostate using a 3D-printed replica prostate as an aid to surgery. From 2013 to 2020 he was editor-in-chief of the urology journal British Journal of Urology International (BJUI).

His awards include the Fellowship of King's College in 2018, the St Peter's Medal from the British Association of Urological Surgeons (BAUS) in 2020, the Kings James IV Professorship of surgery by the Royal College of Surgeons of Edinburgh, and the Padma Shri from the Indian government in 2022.

== Early life and education ==
Prokar Dasgupta was born to a Bengali Baidya parents in Rourkela, Odisha, India. Part of his childhood was spent in Lucknow, his mother's ancestral home city. He received his early education at St Paul's School, Rourkela, before studying at St. Xavier's College, Kolkata. In 1989 he received his medical degree from the Medical College, Kolkata. He did his surgical house job at the David Hare Block. In 1991 he gained a Diplomate of National Board, India.

== Career ==
He completed his FRCS in 1994 and as a Medical Research Council Fellow gained a masters in urology in 1996, FRCS in Urology in 2000 and MD from the University of London in 2001. Before his work on problems of the bladder and prostate, his early research involved the study of the immunology of Leishmaniasis.

=== The overactive bladder ===
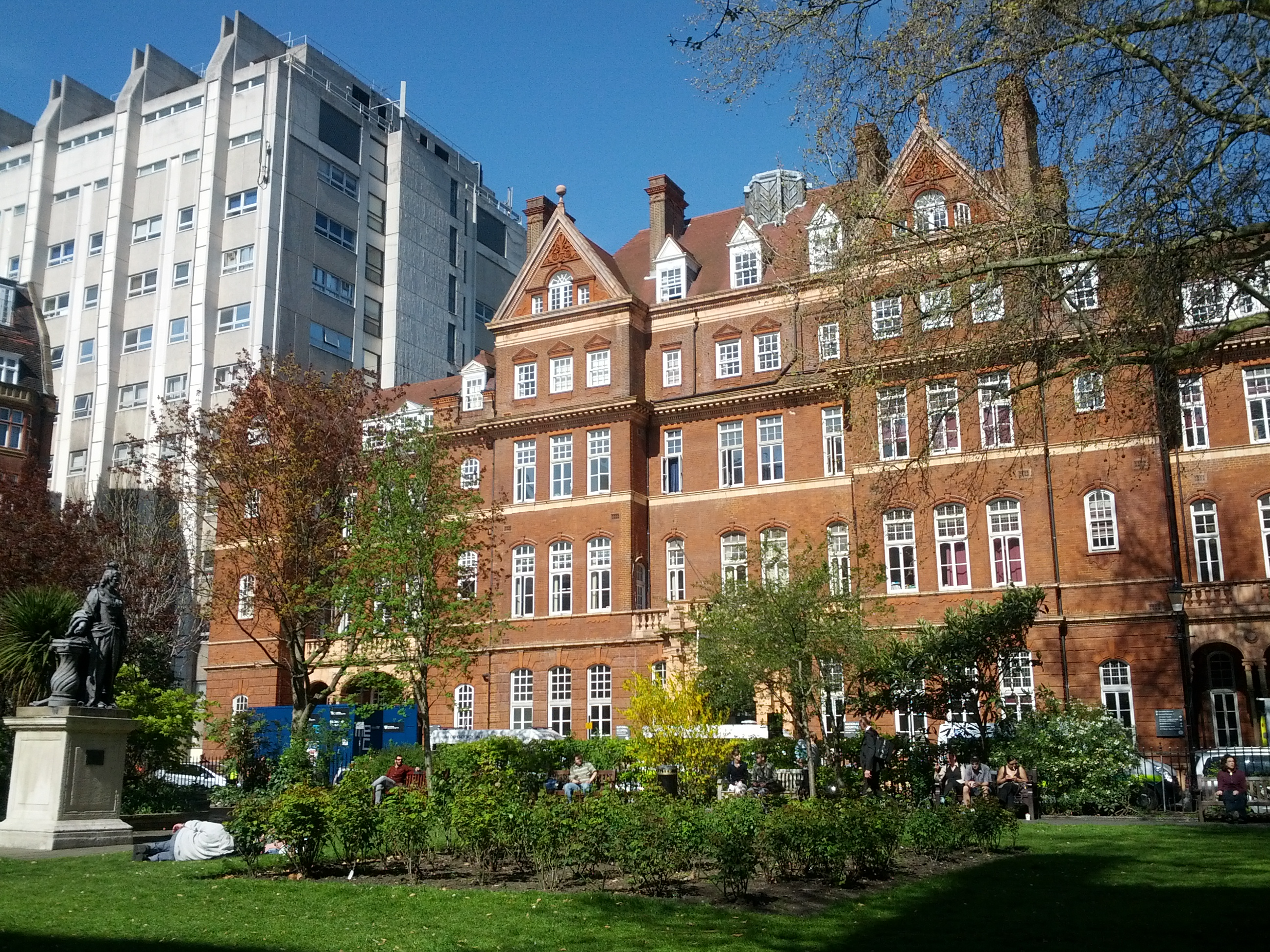
The National Hospital for Neurology and Neurosurgery

Dasgupta's research has included looking at the role and safety of the chilli component capsaicin. In this field, he demonstrated an improvement in symptoms following a course of capsaicin instillation into the bladder in managing urinary incontinence due to an overactive bladder. In 1998, his paper on the topic showed that in people treated with capsaicin instillation, bladder biopsies were normal after five years.

Whilst working at the National Hospital for Neurology and Neurosurgery, Queen Square, as a medical research fellow to Clare Fowler, they developed a technique of injecting botox into the bladder wall to target bladder nerves for treating urinary incontinence due to an overactive bladder that did not respond to traditional measures and usual medications. They were the first in the UK to use this method using a flexible cystoscope. The procedure does not require an operating room or general anaesthetic. In 2002 he was appointed consultant urologist to Guy's Hospital. Three years later, his Botox technique was presented at the 2005 BAUS Annual Scientific Meeting in Glasgow and became known as the 'Dasgupta technique'. He was a co-principal investigator in the first randomized, double-blind, placebo-controlled study pertaining to the procedure, conducted at Guy's Hospital, and it was included as a second-line treatment for refractory overactive bladder by the UK's National Institute for Health and Care Excellence (NICE) in 2006. It was endorsed by the Royal College of Obstetricians and Gynaecologists in 2014, as a second-line option following failure of other treatments. Others have since used and modified the procedure.

=== Robotics ===
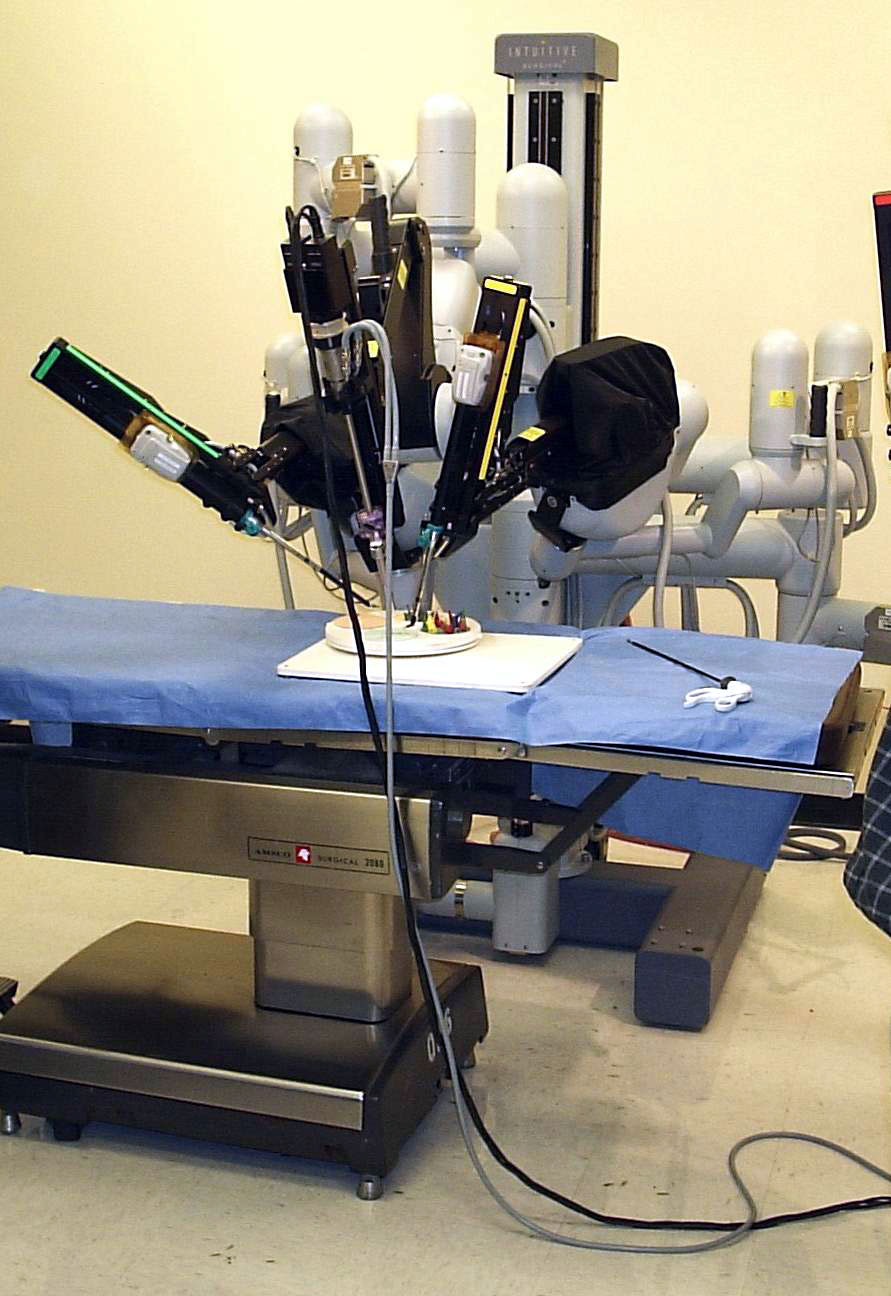
da Vinci robot

In 2005, Dasgupta led the team that used a da Vinci robot to perform one of the early keyhole operations to retrieve a kidney as part of a kidney transplant, in Britain.

In 2009, Dasgupta became the first professor of robotic surgery and urology at King's College London and was subsequently appointed chairman of the King's College-Vattikuti Institute of Robotic Surgery. In 2014, he spoke at Pakistan's Sindh Institute of Urology & Transplantation with proposals to assist Pakistani surgeons with robotic surgery. The following year he was appointed honorary director in the Department of Robotic Surgery at Apollo Gleneagles Hospitals, in Kolkata, India.

In November 2015, he successfully removed a cancerous tumour from a man's prostate using a 3D-printed replica prostate as a pre-surgical aid. The procedure was broadcast at the worldwide robotic surgery 24 hour event.

In 2020, Dasgupta was appointed professor of surgery at the surgical academy at King's Health Partners, an academic health science centre in London, incorporating King's College London, Guy's and St Thomas' NHS Foundation Trust, King's College Hospital NHS Foundation Trust and South London and Maudsley NHS Foundation Trust. In 2026, he performed the UK's first successful remote robotic prostatectomy, operating from London while the patient was in Gibraltar.

=== Journal editor ===
Between 2013 and 2020 he was editor-in-chief of the urology journal, BJU International (BJUI). He sits on the Board of Studies, All India Institute of Medical Sciences, Rishikesh.

== Charity work ==
He is involved in developing treatments for prostate cancer with King's College's Prostate Cancer Research Centre, of which he is a trustee. He is also a trustee of the prostate charities The Malcolm Coptcoat Trust.

== Honours and awards ==
In 2006 the British Association of Urological Surgeons (BAUS) awarded Dasgupta the Karl Storz Harold Hopkins Golden Telescope award. He was appointed president of the Hunterian Society for 2012–2013. In 2017 he was awarded the Fellowship of the Linnaean Society. The following year he received the Fellowship of King's College.

In 2020 he received the St Peter's Medal from the BAUS. In 2021 the Royal College of Surgeons of Edinburgh made him Kings James IV Professor of surgery. In 2022 the Indian government awarded him the Padma Shri.

Dasgupta was appointed Officer of the Order of the British Empire (OBE) in the 2023 Birthday Honours for services to surgery and science. In 2025 he was elected Honorary Fellow of the Royal Academy of Engineering.

== Selected publications ==
Dasgupta has authored and co-authored over 1100 articles including more than 600 peer-reviewed papers in addition to 10 books and 25 chapters.

=== Articles ===
- Dasgupta, P.; Fowler, C.J. (December 1997). "Chillies: from antiquity to urology". British Journal of Urology. 80 (6): 845–852. doi:10.1046/j.1464-410x.1997.00424.x. ISSN 0007-1331. PMID 9439395. (Co-author)
- Harper, M.; Popat, R.B.; Dasgupta, R.; Fowler, C.J.; Dasgupta, P. (August 2003). "A minimally invasive technique for outpatient local anaesthetic administration of intradetrusor botulinum toxin in intractable detrusor overactivity". BJU International. 92 (3): 325–326. doi:10.1046/j.1464-410x.2003.04312.x. ISSN 1464-4096. PMID 12887493. (Co-author)
- Dasgupta, Prokar; Hemal, Ashok; Rose, Kirsten; Guy's St. Thomas' Robotics Group (April 2005). "Robotic urology in the UK: establishing a programme and emerging role". BJU International. 95 (6): 723–724. doi:10.1111/j.1464-410X.2005.05386.x. ISSN 1464-4096. PMID 15794768. (Co-author)
- Challacombe, Ben; Kavoussi, Louis; Patriciu, Alexandru; Stoianovici, Dan; Dasgupta, Prokar (November 2006). "Technology Insight: telementoring and telesurgery in urology". Nature Clinical Practice Urology. 3 (11): 611–617. doi:10.1038/ncpuro0626. ISSN 1743-4289. PMID 17088929. S2CID 6537774. (Co-author)
- Khan, Muhammad Shamim; Gan, Christine; Ahmed, Kamran; Ismail, Ahmad Fahim; Watkins, Jane; Summers, Jennifer A.; Peacock, Janet L.; Rimington, Peter; Dasgupta, Prokar (April 2016). "A Single-centre Early Phase Randomised Controlled Three-arm Trial of Open, Robotic, and Laparoscopic Radical Cystectomy (CORAL)". European Urology. 69 (4): 613–621. doi:10.1016/j.eururo.2015.07.038. ISSN 1873-7560. PMID 26272237. (Co-author)

=== Books ===
- ABC of Prostate Cancer. John Wiley & Sons. 2011. ISBN 978-1-4443-4691-6. (Co-authored with Roger Kirby)
- Surgical Simulation. Anthem Press. 2014. ISBN 978-1-78308-156-1. (Co-authored with Kamran Ahmed, Peter Jaye and Mohammed Shamim Khan)
