= David Stevens, Baron Stevens of Ludgate =

British politician (born 1936)

The Right Honourable The Lord Stevens of Ludgate
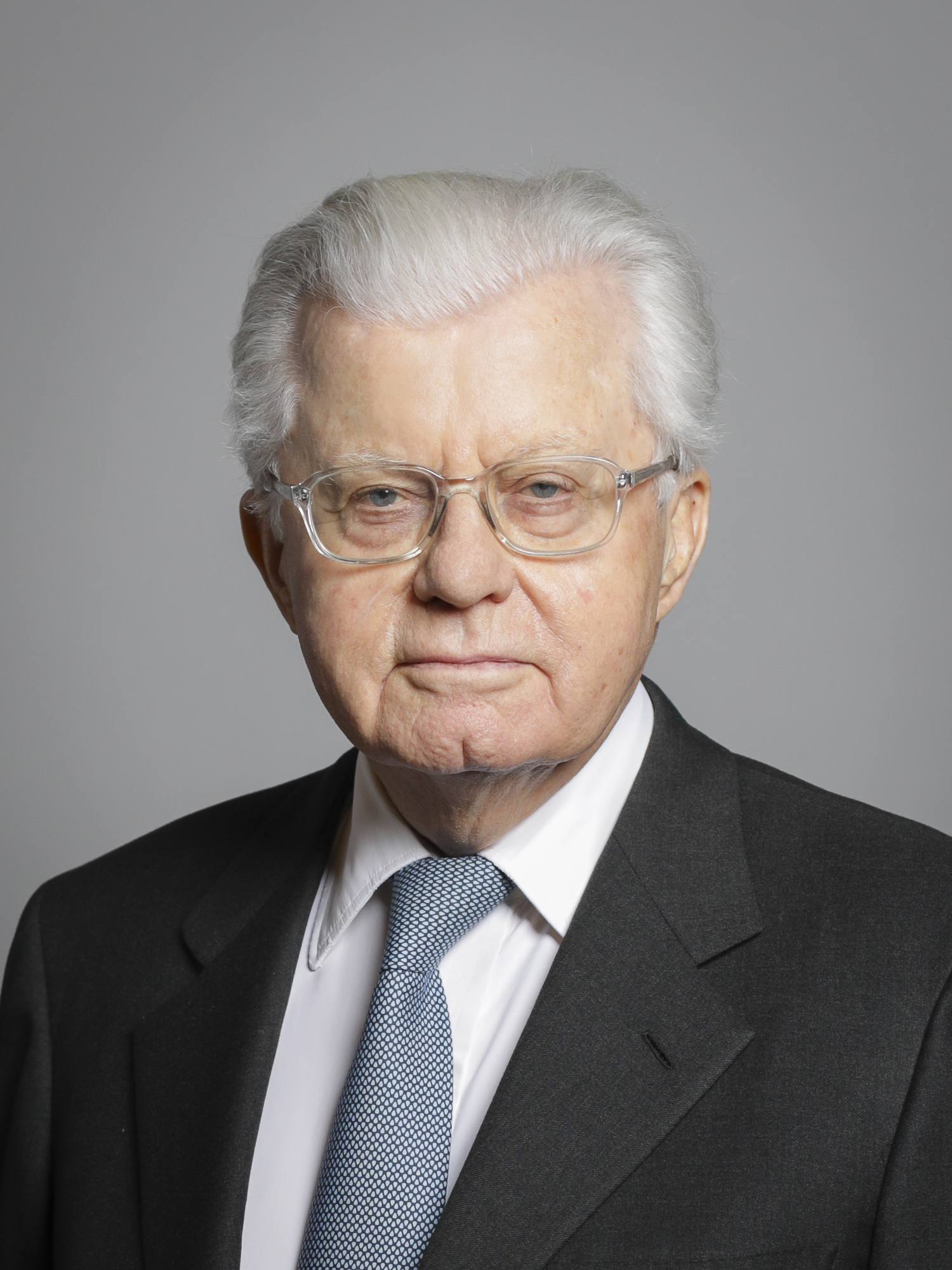

Member of the House of Lords
- Lord Temporal
- Life peerage 27 March 1987

Personal details
- Born: 26 May 1936 (age 90)
- Party: Independent Conservative (2004–2012, 2018–present); UKIP (2012–2018); Conservative (until 2004)
- Education: Sidney Sussex College, Cambridge

David Robert Stevens, Baron Stevens of Ludgate (born 26 May 1936), is a British peer who was formerly one of two UK Independence Party (UKIP) members in the House of Lords.

He was educated at Stowe School and Sidney Sussex College, Cambridge (MA, economics). He is the son of Arthur Edwin Stevens, creator of the first body-worn electronic hearing aid. He was the chairman of United Newspapers, 1981–1999.

He was created a life peer on 27 March 1987 taking the title Baron Stevens of Ludgate, of Ludgate in the City of London. He originally sat as a Conservative, but was expelled by the party in 2004 after he signed a letter in support of UKIP. He sat as an Independent Conservative but joined UKIP in 2012. In late 2018, he left UKIP to once again sit as an Independent Conservative.

== Arms ==
Coat of arms of David Stevens, Baron Stevens of Ludgate
Coronet A Coronet of a Baron Crest A Triple Mount Vert thereon a Crest Coronet Or the lesser finials (two manifest) pearled proper statant within the same a Swan wings displayed proper about the neck two Ribands nowed and the ends flotant to the rear Gules and Argent Escutcheon Argent a Bear rampant proper and a Chief embattled Azure Supporters Dexter: a Lion sejant erect and guardant Or; Sinister: a Cairn Terrier also sejant erect and guardant proper, the whole upon a Compartment comprising a Grassy Mount also proper Motto PERSEVERANCE

Orders of precedence in the United Kingdom
Preceded by The Lord Irvine of Lairg	Gentlemen; Baron Stevens of Ludgate	Followed by The Lord Cavendish of Furness
