= Christopher Joseph Earl =

British neurologist

Christopher Joseph Earl (20 November 1925 - 4 March 2012) was a British neurologist at the National Hospital for Neurology and Neurosurgery, Queen's Square, London. He had trained under Sir Charles Symonds and was later president of the Association of British Neurologists. His method of diagnosing neurological disease was described by colleagues as “reminiscent of Sherlock Holmes solving a crime”.
