= Fowler's syndrome =

- Other names: Urethral sphincter relaxation disorder
- Specialty: Uro-neurology

Fowler's syndrome (urethral sphincter relaxation disorder) is a rare disorder in which the urethral sphincter fails to relax to allow urine to be passed normally in younger women with abnormal electromyographic activity detected.

== Presentation ==
Fowler's syndrome primarily presents in women between menarche and menopause. The peak age of onset is 26 years. It is seen in about one third of the women who experience urinary retention. The predominant complaint is the inability to urinate for a day or more with no urgency to urinate, in spite of a large bladder volume of more than 1 liter. Normally, a person feels the need to urinate at a bladder volume of 400-500 mL. The person usually has a progressively increasing lower abdominal pain. The condition can be associated with polyendocrine metabolic ovarian syndrome and endometriosis.

Alternatively, women with Fowler's syndrome can present with impaired voiding, voiding difficulties with or without incomplete bladder emptying, and increased urinary frequency, but rarely become incontinent.

Women with Fowler's syndrome often find catheterisation extremely painful.

Fowler's syndrome can be a disabling condition. 50% of women with Fowler's syndrome suffer from unexplained chronic pain, including chronic abdominopelvic, back, leg, or widespread pain. Symptoms can be severe enough to have a debilitating effect on quality of life.

== Cause ==
The exact cause of Fowler's syndrome is not yet known.

It may occur spontaneously, or following an event such as a surgical procedure or childbirth. Use of opiates can also trigger urinary retention.

There is not usually any prior history of urological abnormalities in childhood.

One hypothesis is that it is due to an abnormality in muscle membrane, possibly hormonally dependent channelopathy causing excessive excitability of the external urethral sphincter which prevents the adequate relaxation of the muscle necessary for voiding.

Another hypothesis in that Fowler's syndrome is due to an up-regulation of spinal cord enkephalins and that opiates may compound the functional abnormalities.

It has also been hypothesised that there are both local pelvic floor and central neurological causations.

== Diagnosis ==
Urodynamic testing including Cystometry and Urethral Pressure Profilometry.

Women with Fowler's syndrome are often found to have an abnormally elevated urethral pressure profile, increased urethral sphincter volume.

The diagnosis is done by testing the Electromyography (EMG) of the external striated urethral sphincter.

Women with Fowler's syndrome characteristically show abnormal electromyography of the urethral sphincter. The usual findings are complex repetitive discharges without and with deceleration (decelerating bursts), suggesting an impairment in sphincter muscle relaxation.

== Treatment ==
Sacral neuromodulation is the only treatment that has been found to restore voiding in women with Fowler's syndrome. It delivers an electric current to the neural reflexes associated with lower urinary tract function via stimulation of the S3 spinal nerve root.

Although success rate is about 70%, there can be complications and it has a relatively high re-intervention rate.

Sacral Neuromodulation is thought to work because the sensory parts of the brain (the periaqueductal grey), which receives sensory signals from the Lower Urinary Tract, becomes activated in women with Fowler's syndrome when the device is switched on. The neuromodulation from the device overrides the negative feedback from the sacral nerves.

Other treatment options are:

- Sphincter injections of botulinum toxin.
- Catheterisation. Women with Fowler's syndrome may report difficulties in performing self catheterisation therefore an indwelling catheter such as a suprapubic catheter may be required.
- Bethanechol medication.

== History ==
This disease is named for Clare Fowler, an author of the 1985 article that first reported it.
