= Centre for policy research on men and boys =

The Centre for policy research on men and boys, established in 2025, is a research organisation for understanding problems affecting men and boys in the United Kingdom.
