= Microdissection =

- MeSH: D042282

Microdissection refers to a variety of techniques where a microscope is used to assist in dissection.

Different kinds of techniques involve microdissection:

- Chromosome microdissection — use of fine glass needle under a microscope to remove a portion from a complete chromosome.
- Laser microdissection — use of a laser through a microscope to dissect selected cells.
- Laser capture microdissection — use of a laser through a microscope to cause selected cells to adhere to a film.
