= European Board of Urology =

European professional organization

The European Board of Urology (EBU) is the professional urological (genito-urinary surgery) regulation authority in Europe, with head offices at Arnhem, The Netherlands. The objectives are threefold: setting standards for the training of urologists in Europe, providing accreditation of CME/CPD, and offering assessments and exams.

It awards the designation of Fellow of the European Board of Urology (FEBU) after rigorous examinations. Part 1 is a written examination and part 2 an oral one.
