= Roman Stefan Kocen =

Roman Stefan Kocen (20 March 1932 – 2 April 2013) was a Polish-British neurologist.

== Career ==
Kocen was born on 20 March 1932 in Łódź, Poland. He was neurologist at the Middlesex Hospital and later at the National Hospital for Neurology and Neurosurgery, Queen's Square, London, where his work included the study of neurological complications of tuberculosis. At the age of 18, he received a state scholarship to study medicine at Leeds University and Leeds General Infirmary.
