= J. Kellogg Parsons =

J. Kellogg Parsons is an American physician specializing in urology.

== Education ==
Parsons received his Doctor of Medicine (M.D.) degree from the University of Pennsylvania School of Medicine. He completed a residency in urology at the Johns Hopkins Hospital in Baltimore, Maryland. He has a Master in Health Sciences from the Johns Hopkins Bloomberg School of Medicine.

== Endowed Chair ==
He is the holder of the C. Lowell and JoEllen Parsons Endowed Chair in Urology at the University of California, San Diego, where his research has shown that lifestyle factors, such as obesity, diabetes and lack of exercise, can contribute towards urinary complaints.

Parsons is a urologic oncologist.
