= Pamela Margaret Le Quesne =

British neurologist

Pamela Margaret Le Quesne (6 August 1931 – 2 August 1999), was a British neurologist and the first woman to be appointed to the House at the National Hospital for Neurology and Neurosurgery, Queen's Square, London, after the Second World War.
