= BJU International =

- Discipline: Urology
- Language: English
- Edited by: Freddie Hamdy

Publication details
- Former name(s): British Journal of Urology
- History: 1929–present
- Publisher: Wiley-Blackwell
- Frequency: Monthly
- Impact factor: 3.7 (2023)

Standard abbreviations
- ISO 4: BJU Int.

Indexing
- CODEN: BJINFO
- ISSN: 1464-4096 (print); 1464-410X (web)
- OCLC no.: 610415745

Links
- Journal homepage; Online access; Online archive

BJU International (or BJUI, formerly known as the British Journal of Urology) is a monthly peer-reviewed medical journal that was established in 1929. The editor-in-chief is Freddie Hamdy and the journal is published by Wiley-Blackwell. It covers research on all aspects of urology.

The Journal is wholly owned by BJU International charity. The charity is affiliated with many urological societies around the world and the Journal is an official journal for many of these associations.

- British Association of Urological Surgeons (BAUS) – Official Journal
- Caribbean Urological Association (CURA) – Official Journal
- Hong Kong Urological Association (HKUA) – Official Journal and affiliated
- Indonesian Urological Association – Affiliated
- International Alliance of Urolithiasis – Affiliated Journal
- Investigative and Clinical Urology – Affiliated Journal
- Irish Society of Urology (ISU) – Official Journal
- Malaysian Urological Association – Affiliated
- Myanmar Nephro-Urology Society – Affiliated
- Sri Lankan Association of Urological Surgeons (SLAUS) – Affiliated and official international Journal
- Swiss Continence Foundation – Official Journal
- Urological Society of Australia and New Zealand (USANZ) – Affiliated and official Journal

== Abstracting and indexing ==
This journal is abstracted and indexed in:

- Biological Abstracts
- Chemical Abstracts Service
- Current Contents
- Excerpta Medica
- Elsevier Biobase/Current Awareness in Biological Sciences
- Index medicus/MEDLINE/PubMed
- Science Citation Index

According to the Journal Citation Reports, the journal has a 2023 impact factor of 3.7, ranking it 19th out of 126 journals in the category "Urology & Nephrology".

== See also ==
- List of medical journals
