= Amanda Holden (writer) =

English pianist, librettist, translator, editor (1948–2021)

- Born: Amanda Juliet Warren; 19 January 1948; London, England
- Died: 7 September 2021 (aged 73)
- Education: Lady Margaret Hall, Oxford; Guildhall School of Music and Drama; American University; Royal Academy of Music
- Occupations: Pianist; Librettist; Opera translator; Lecturer; Editor
- Spouse: Anthony Holden (m. 1971; div. 1988)
- Children: 3
- Parents: Brian Warren (father); Josephine Barnes (mother)
- Awards: Laurence Olivier Award

Amanda Juliet Holden (née Warren; 19 January 1948 – 7 September 2021) was a British pianist, librettist, translator and editor of musical encyclopedias. She is known for translating opera librettos to contemporary English for the English National Opera, and for writing new librettos, especially in collaboration with Brett Dean. She was also the principal editor of several musical encyclopedias, such as the New Penguin Opera Guide.

== Life and career ==
Amanda Juliet Warren was born in London, the daughter of Sir Brian Warren and Dame Josephine Barnes. She was educated at Benenden School, and studied at Lady Margaret Hall, Oxford, with Egon Wellesz where she gained a Master of Arts (MA), at Guildhall School of Music and Drama and a MA at the American University, Washington, DC. She also had degrees from the Royal Academy of Music (ARCM and LRAM). She first worked as a freelance pianist and accompanist, teacher at the Guildhall School, and therapist from 1973 to 1986.

=== Librettos and other texts for the stage ===
Many of Holden's opera libretto translations were commissioned by the English National Opera (ENO). She translated Mozart's Don Giovanni for Jonathan Miller in 1985. For the ENO, she also translated Handel's Partenope, Rodelinda, Ariodante, Alcina and Agrippina, Donizetti's Lucia di Lammermoor, Rossini's The Barber of Seville, and Puccini's La bohème.

Holden translated HK Gruber's Gloria: A Pigtale in 2002, which critic Bernard Holland of The New York Times found heavy-handed but "rescued by Amanda Holden's clever English version". She made a "highly acclaimed translation" of Puccini's Madama Butterfly for David Freeman's production at the Royal Albert Hall in 2011. Holden prepared the "deft" narration for a concert performance of Weber's Der Freischütz presented by the London Symphony Orchestra at the Barbican Centre in April 2012. She translated Gluck's Orpheus and Eurydice for the St. Louis Opera in 2018, Pascal Dusapin's Passion for its UK premiere at the Music Theatre Wales in 2018, and Hans Abrahamsen's The Snow Queen for Munich in 2019.

Holden's librettos for contemporary operas include Bliss, for the Australian composer Brett Dean which was premiered by Opera Australia. The Age compared Holden's partnership with Dean in "long-distance collaboration" to the composer–librettist partnerships of Mozart and da Ponte, and Richard Strauss and Hugo von Hofmannsthal. She wrote the libretto for Mark-Anthony Turnage's The Silver Tassie, which premiered at the ENO in 2000, and for which Holden and Turnage jointly received the Laurence Olivier Award for Outstanding Achievement in Opera in 2001. She also wrote texts for plays, songs, concert works and music theatre.

=== Publications ===
Holden's publications include contributions to The Mozart Compendium in 1990, the New Penguin Opera Guide in 2001 and the Penguin Concise Guide to Opera in 2005. James Oestreich, writing in The New York Times, described the New Penguin Opera Guide as a "valuable source" and "most impressive", though he would have liked the index to cover performers, places and events – rather than just the composers and librettists.

Her works included:

- Amanda Holden (ed.): The Penguin Concise Guide to Opera. Penguin, reprinted 2005. ISBN 978-0-14-101682-5
- Amanda Holden (ed.): The New Penguin Opera Guide. Penguin 2001. (Reprinted in paperback 2003) ISBN 978-0-14-029312-8
- Amanda Holden (ed.): The Penguin Opera Guide. Penguin 1995. (Reprinted in paperback 1997) ISBN 978-0-14-025131-9
- Amanda Holden, Nicholas Kenyon and Stephen Walsh (eds.): The Viking Opera Guide. (with CD-ROM) 1993 ISBN 978-0-670-81292-9

=== Personal life ===
Holden married writer and broadcaster Anthony Holden in 1971. They had three sons and divorced in 1988. She died on 7 September 2021, at the age of 73.
