= Conservative Party Archive =

Records of the Conservative Party of the UK

Coordinates: 51.755°N 1.255°W

Conservative party Archive (CPA)
Agency overview
- Formed: 1978
- Jurisdiction: Conservative Party Archive Trust
- Headquarters: Oxford, England
- Agency executives: Richard Ovenden, Librarian of Bodleian Library; Catriona Cannon, Deputy Librarian
- Website: www2.bodleian.ox.ac.uk/cpa

The Conservative Party Archive (CPA) is the official place of deposit for the historic records of the Conservative Party of the United Kingdom. Based at the Bodleian Library in Oxford, England, it was established as a centre for people.

== Overview ==
It comprises an extensive range of manuscript, published and audio-visual material representing the history of the Conservative Party from the late 19th century up to the present day.

The Conservative Party Archive is owned by the Conservative Party Archive Trust and is deposited on loan with the Department of Special Collections & Western Manuscripts of the Bodleian Library which is recognised as holding one of the foremost collections of modern political papers in Britain, including the private papers of six British Prime Ministers. The cost of maintaining the Archive at the Bodleian is borne entirely by the Conservative Party Archive Trust, an educational charity, which raises funds from private donors; no financial support is received from the Conservative Party.

While the oldest papers in the Archive date back to 1867, sadly many records were lost during the wars, and a number of moves by Conservative Central Office led to the destruction of still more, particularly from the period before 1939. As a result, the Archive consists predominantly of post-Second World War material. More recent material is regularly transferred to the Archive from Conservative Campaign Headquarters (previously Conservative Central Office).

For students of the Conservative Party's past, the Conservative Party Archive is an essential source of reference. Its unrivalled accumulation of papers, some published but the vast majority unpublished gives a unique insight into the development of the Party's policies and organisation. [William Hague, 2001]

== The structure of the Conservative Party Archive ==
Papers held in the Archive reflect the three main sections of the Party:
the voluntary (through the papers of the National Union of Conservative and Unionist Associations and its successor, the National Conservative Convention);
the elected (through the papers of the 1922 Committee);
and the professional (through the papers of Conservative Central Office and its successor, Conservative Campaign Headquarters).
The Archive also includes other categories such as audio-visual material and a large library of material published and printed by the Conservative Party.

The main collections within the Archive are as follows:

National Union of Conservative and Unionist Associations, and its Area Offices
Conservative Central Office (since 2004, Conservative Campaign Headquarters), including the Conservative Research Department
1922 Committee
Advisory Committee on Policy
Shadow Cabinet (or Leader's Consultative Committee)
Steering Committee
Official Group
Private Papers
Scottish Unionist Members' Committee
Swinton College
Conservative Whip's Office
Library of Published and Printed Material (printed Party literature, press releases, speeches)

A full catalogue of the archive is available online at: online catalogue

=== National Union of Conservative And Unionist Associations, 1867–present ===
The National Union of Conservative and Unionist Associations (now known as the National Conservative Convention) was established in 1867. It is a federation of constituency associations, bringing together the rank and file of the Party in a national organisation. Representatives of the constituencies meet at area and national level, and a system of advisory committees is used to convey grass roots opinion to the Party leadership. The Convention exists to express opinion and support and, as such, can exert a degree of influence on the Leader and over Party policy. It does not, however, possess any mandatory powers. The annual Party Conference is a Convention function.

The Conservative Party's provincial organisation is based on 26 "areas", mostly corresponding to two or three counties. This structure has been in place since the 1997 General Election. Prior to this date, the Party's structure was based on eleven larger Areas, such as North Western or Southern, and it is this structure which is reflected in the files held in the Conservative Party Archive.

The National Union organisation within each area was headed by the Area Council, comprising MPs, candidates, area officials, representatives from each constituency and constituency agents. The Area Council generally met once a year, and most area business was conducted by the Area Advisory Committee which complemented those at national level and co-ordinated similar advisory committees in individual constituencies. In some areas, in addition to the area structure, there also existed a number of County Divisions or Federations, again with their own committees. Papers from individual constituency associations are not held in Conservative Party Archive but have been retained by association offices or transferred to local libraries and record offices.

- National Union records held in the Conservative Party Archive
- Area Office records held in the Conservative Party Archive
- Locate local constituency associations
- contact details for local libraries and county record offices

=== Conservative Central Office, 1936–present ===
Conservative Central Office, established in 1870, constitutes the main professional and organisational element of the Party. Initially under overall control of the Chief Whip, by 1911 it had grown sufficiently to warrant the appointment of a Chairman of the Party Organisation. This was, and has almost invariably been, a politician of cabinet or near-cabinet rank, and the deputy and vice-chairmen have generally also been political appointments, though not necessarily MPs.

- Conservative Central Office/CCHQ records held in the Conservative Party Archive

=== 1922 Committee, 1923–present ===
The 1922 Committee was formed [in 1923] of Conservative Private Members who were elected for the first time in 1922, for the purpose of mutual co-operation and assistance in dealing political and parliamentary questions and to enable new Members to take a more active interest and part in parliamentary life... (CPA, 1922/1) Today every Conservative back-bench MP is a member of the committee. It provides a sounding board of Conservative opinion in the House of Commons, and allows MPs to put forward ideas, views and concerns through a process of dialogue, rather than through confrontation with the leadership. As such, it has been involved in all the major issues of the twentieth century.

- Records of the 1922 Committee held in the Conservative Party Archive

=== Advisory Committee on Policy, 1946–79 ===
The Advisory Committee on Policy (ACP) lies at the heart of the Conservative Party. From its foundation in 1946 until the 1970s it was the central forum for considering policy, and its deliberations provide an important and revealing insight into the inner workings of Conservative Politics. Its founding father was R.A. Butler, one of the most important figures in the post-war revival and the governments of 1951–64. He remained its chairman until 1965, and under his patronage and influence the ACP became the Party's clearing house for ideas and policies. This series is available on microform up until 1964.

- Records of the Advisory Committee on Policy held in the Conservative Party Archive

=== Shadow Cabinet (or Leader's Consultative Committee), 1964–present ===
The Leader's Consultative Committee is the most central of policy organs and the supreme decision-making body of the Party. Also known as the Shadow Cabinet, its membership is always by invitation from the Leader. Its secretary is usually the Director of the Conservative Research Department when the Party is in opposition. The Conservative Party Archive only holds the files of this committee when the Party is in Opposition; Cabinet records are held at The National Archives at Kew.

- Records of the Shadow Cabinet held in the Conservative Party Archive

=== Steering Committee, 1963–76 ===
The Steering Committee was, in effect, an inner cabinet of Ministers meeting together, without their civil servants, to look ahead politically. (In Opposition, this body was an inner Shadow Cabinet). The Steering Committee was first formally constituted in 1957.

- Records of the Steering Committee held in the Conservative Party Archive

=== Official Group, 1967–74 ===
The Conservative Official Group has existed under several names, such as the Research Study Group and the Policy Study Group, and was also known as the Chairman's Committee while headed by Iain Macleod as Party chairman. It is a gathering of MPs and professionals from the Research Department and Central Office, mainly brought together for the purposes of assembling and drafting a manifesto but advising on other matters too. Its secretary usually comes from the Research Department.

- Records of the Official Group held in the Conservative Party Archive
- An archive of Conservative electoral manifestos from 1900–present

=== Private papers ===
The Conservative Party Archive includes correspondence of MPs, ministers, shadow ministers and leaders engaged in Party activity and three small collections of private papers: papers of R. A. (later Lord) Butler, 1946–1961, Sir Keith (later Lord) Joseph, 1973–1979, and Sir Michael (later Lord) Fraser, c.1929-c.1937.

- R.A. Butler papers in the Conservative Party Archive
- Sir Keith Joseph papers in the Conservative Party Archive
- Michael Fraser papers in the Conservative Party Archive

=== Scottish Unionist Members' Committee, 1932–64 ===
The Scottish Unionist Members' Committee [SUMC] came into being in March 1932 and was open to all Scottish MPs. During the 1930s it met between five and twelve times a year with about twenty MPs attending each meeting. The Conservative Party Archive holds only a small quantity of SUMC material. The majority of records of the Scottish Conservative and Unionist Party are held at National Library of Scotland.

- Records of the Scottish Unionist Members' Committee held in the Conservative Party Archive

=== Swinton College, 1948–80 ===
Swinton College was the third and final Conservative College, its predecessors being the Philip Stott College and the Bonar Law Memorial College. Its papers deal in the main with the administration of the college and include correspondence between the Principal and the Governors, various committee meetings, course scholarships, and copies of its published journal.

- Records of Swinton College held in the Conservative Party Archive

=== Conservative Whips' Office, 1928–1951 ===
The Conservative Party Archive contains only a limited amount of papers from the Conservative Whips' Office. The subjects covered include:-
(1930s) electoral reform, General Elections, Party political broadcasts, old age pensions;
(1940s) Sir Joseph Ball's proposals for Party re-organisation, food and agriculture, structure of the National Union, trade union vote, Party political broadcasts, National Liberal reflections, civilian clothing, BBC Charter, women and the war effort.

- Records of the Conservative Whips' Office held in the Conservative Party Archive

=== Library of Published and Printed Material, 1868–present ===
A large number of election posters dating from 1886 and election addresses from 1922 can be found in the Conservative Party Archive. The collection also includes speeches, press releases and transcripts of Party political broadcasts, and many Party publications such as leaflets, pamphlets, campaign guides and journals. Conservative Party political broadcasts and films are available at the National Film and Television Archive.
