= Alistair Cooke, Baron Lexden =

Life peer in the House of Lords (born 1945)

The Right Honourable The Lord Lexden OBE
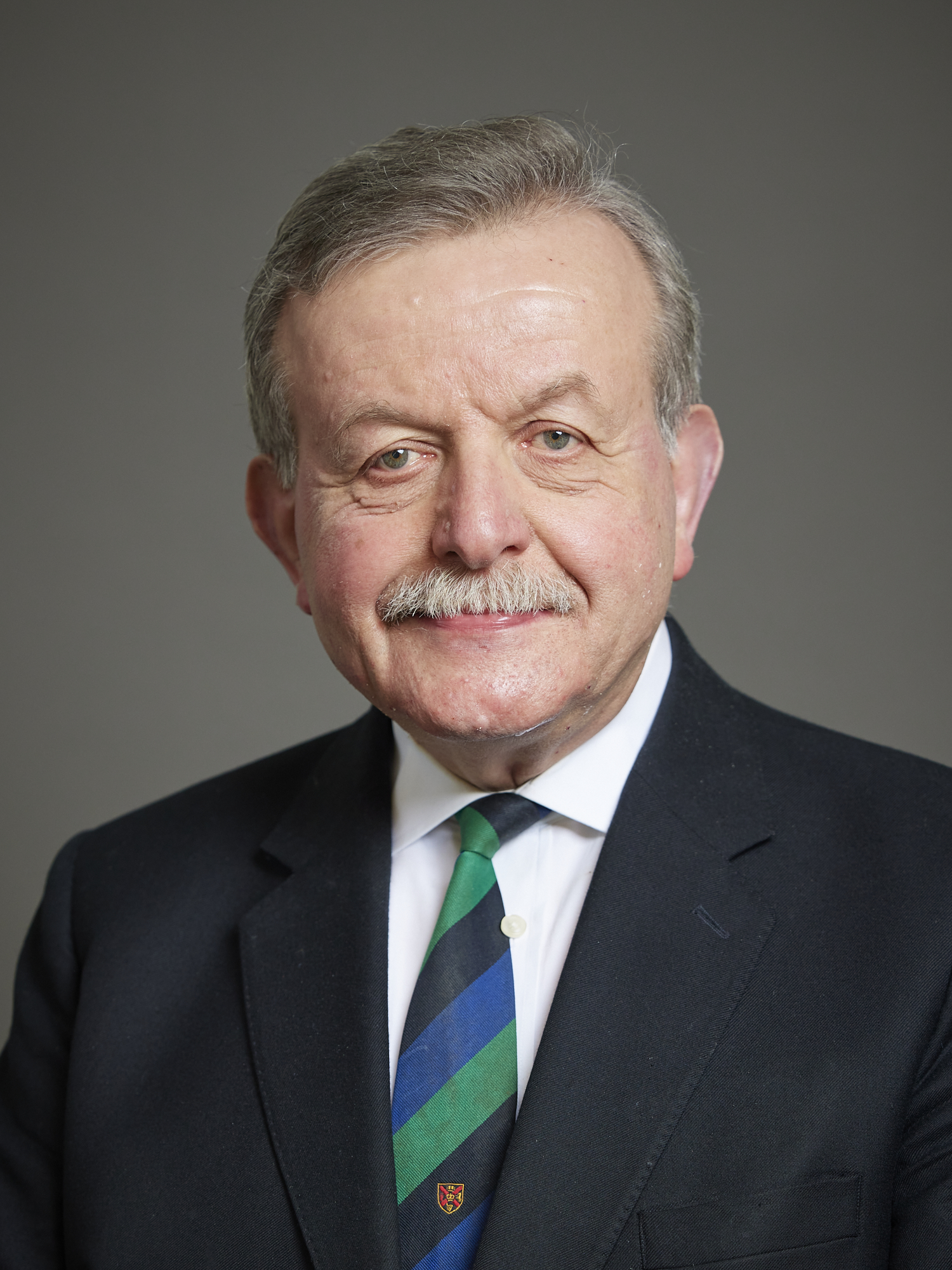
- Official portrait, 2023

Deputy Speaker of the House of Lords
- Incumbent
- Assumed office 5 March 2018

Member of the House of Lords
- Lord Temporal
- Life peerage 23 December 2010

Personal details
- Born: Alistair Basil Cooke; 20 April 1945 (age 81)
- Party: Conservative
- Occupation: Historian
- Website: www.alistairlexden.org.uk

Alistair Basil Cooke, Baron Lexden, OBE (born 20 April 1945) is a British historian, author and politician who sits as a Conservative life peer in the House of Lords.

Lord Lexden has been official historian of the Conservative Party since 2009; Consultant and Editor in Chief, Conservative Research Department since 2004 and official historian and archivist of the Carlton Club since 2007.

== Early life and academic career ==
Cooke was born on 20 April 1945, second son of Dr Basil Cooke and Nancy Irene Cooke (née Neal). He was educated at the private Framlingham College, Suffolk. He went on to study at Peterhouse, Cambridge, from which he graduated Master of Arts (MA Cantab) in 1970. He was a lecturer and tutor in modern history at The Queen's University of Belfast from 1971 to 1977 and was awarded a PhD from that institution in 1979.

== Conservative Party ==
Cooke worked as a desk officer within the Conservative Research Department from 1977 to 1983. During this period, he served as political adviser to Airey Neave, Shadow Secretary of State for Northern Ireland, 1977–79. He joined the Conservative Political Centre in 1983 as assistant director, becoming deputy director two years later and Director between 1988 and 1997.

He was appointed an Officer of the Order of the British Empire (OBE) in the 1988 New Year Honours. He was a founder, in 1997, and member since 2005 of the Conservative Party Archive Trust. He was Chairman of Trustees of the pressure group Friends of the Union between 1995 and 2003 and has been Senior Trustee of the T. E. Utley Memorial Fund since 2000.

== House of Lords ==
Cooke was made a life peer as Baron Lexden, of Lexden in the County of Essex and of Strangford in the County of Down, on 23 December 2010 on the recommendation of Prime Minister David Cameron. He sits in the House of Lords as a Conservative.

Lord Lexden's website highlights his work in the Lords, including speeches, videos, letters and articles for numerous publications, including ConservativeHome and The House magazine.

Lexden is a frequent contributor to many national newspapers, offering a historical context to modern political life.

== Other activities ==
With the Conservative return to opposition in 1997, Cooke worked as General Secretary of the Independent Schools Council from 1997 to 2004 and later became President of the Independent Schools Association. He has also been a Governor of The John Lyon School Harrow from 1999 to 2005 and Patron of the Northern Ireland Schools Debating Competition since 2001. He is a frequent contributor The Times Letters and Obituary pages.

Lexden is an occasional television guest presenter. In 2019, he presented a BBC TV programme called Prime Properties about former Prime Ministers Stanley Baldwin

As a member and historian of London's Carlton Club, Lexden objected to the club's hanging of a portrait of former Prime Minister Boris Johnson on the grounds that Johnson had "brought discredit on the highest political office". The painting was duly removed and rehung in the club's "Cad's Corner".

As of 2017, he was unmarried.

Lexden expressed his concern in a letter to The Times in January 2017 regarding the accessibility of the Royal Archives at Windsor. He wrote that "Favoured authors likely to deal indulgently with royal reputations can expect to be treated with great kindness by the archivists at Windsor. For the rest of us it is often a different story" and wrote that he had been refused access to Queen Victoria's journals when researching the 1886 Home Rule crisis. Lexden felt that "The public has access to them on terms that are the same for everyone. We must have clear, objective criteria for access to the Royal Archives without any attempt to censor publication of material that illuminates history". He echoed his position in a further letter in March 2017.

== Publications ==
- Lord Carlingford's Journal (1971) (joint editor)
- The Governing Passion; Cabinet Government and Party Politics in Britain 1885–86 (1974) (joint author)
- The Ashbourne Papers 1869–1913 (1974) (editor)
- The Conservative Party's Campaign Guides (7 vols, 1987–2005) (editor)
- The Conservative Party: Seven Historical Studies, (1997) (editor)
- The Conservative Research Department 1929–2004 (2004) (editor)
- The Carlton Club 1832–2007 (2007) (joint author)
- Tory Heroine: Dorothy Brant and the Rise of Conservative Women (2008)
- A Party of Change: a Brief History of the Conservatives (2008)
- Between the Thin Blue Lines (2008)(contributor)
- Tory Policy-Making: the Conservative Research Department 1929–2009 (2009) (joint author)
- A Gift from the Churchills: The Primrose League 1883–2004 (2010)

As well as pamphlets on Northern Ireland and constitutional issues and articles in historical journals and educational publications.

Orders of precedence in the United Kingdom
Preceded by The Lord Ribeiro	Gentlemen; Baron Lexden	Followed by The Lord Risby
