= February 1974 Dissolution Honours =

British government recognitions

The February 1974 Dissolution Honours List was issued on 2 April 1974 following the dissolution of the United Kingdom parliament in preparation for a general election.

== Life Peers ==
=== Baronesses ===
- Mervyn Pike, Member of Parliament for the Melton Division of Leicestershire 1956–74; Assistant Postmaster General 1959–63; Joint Parliamentary Under-Secretary of State, Home Office 1963–64.
- Rt Hon. Dame Margaret Patricia Hornsby-Smith DBE, Member of Parliament for Chislehurst 1950–66 and 1970–74; Parliamentary Secretary, Ministry of Health 1951–57; Joint Parliamentary Under-Secretary of State, Home Office 1957–59; Joint Parliamentary Secretary, Ministry of Pensions and National Insurance 1959–61.

=== Barons ===
- Sir Tufton Victor Hamilton Beamish MC DL, Member of Parliament for the Lewes Division of East Sussex 1945–74.
- Sir Richard Michael Fraser CBE, Deputy Chairman of the Conservative Party Organisation since October 1964.
- Rt Hon. Geoffrey William Lloyd, Member of Parliament for Birmingham, Ladywood Division 1931–45, King's Norton Division 1950–55; Sutton Coldfield 1955–74; Minister of Fuel and Power 1951–55; Minister of Education 1957–59.
- Rt Hon. Ernest Marples, Member of Parliament for Wallasey 1945–74; Postmaster General 1957–59; Minister of Transport 1959–64.
- Rt Hon. Michael Antony Cristobal Noble, Member of Parliament for Argyllshire 1958–74; Secretary of State for Scotland 1962–64; Minister for Trade 1970–72.
- Rt Hon. Duncan Edwin Sandys CH, Member of Parliament for Norwood 1935–45; Streatham 1950–74; Minister of Works 1944–45; Minister of Supply 1951–54; Minister of Housing and Local Government 1954–57; Minister of Defence 1957–59; Minister of Aviation 1959–60; Secretary of State for Commonwealth Relations 1960–1964.
- Rt Hon. Sir Robert Hugh Turton KBE MC DL, Member of Parliament for the Thirsk and Malton Division of Yorkshire 1929–74; Minister of Health 1955–57.

== Privy Counsellors (PC) ==
- Betty Harvie Anderson OBE TD MP, Member of Parliament for East Renfrewshire since 1959; Deputy Chairman of Ways and Means, House of Commons 1970–73.
- Rt Hon. Priscilla Jean Fortescue, Baroness Tweedsmuir of Belhelvie, Member of Parliament for Aberdeen South 1946–66; Minister of State, Scottish Office 1970–72; Minister of State, Foreign and Commonwealth Office 1972–74.
- James David Gibson-Watt MC DL MP, Member of Parliament for Hereford since 1956; Minister of State, Welsh Office 1970–74.

== Knights Bachelor (Kt) ==
- Brian Caldwell Cook Batsford, Member of Parliament for Ealing South 1958–74; Assistant Whip 1962–64; Opposition Deputy Chief Whip 1964–67.
- Robert Chichester-Clark, Member of Parliament for Londonderry City and County 1955–74; Comptroller of H.M. Household 1961–64; Minister of State, Department of Employment 1972–74.
- Robert William Elliott MP, Member of Parliament for Newcastle upon Tyne North since 1957; Comptroller of H.M. Household 1970; Vice-Chairman, Conservative Party Organisation since 1970.
- Timothy Peter Geoffrey Kitson MP, Member of Parliament for Richmond, Yorkshire since 1959; Parliamentary Private Secretary to the Prime Minister 1970–74.
- Harold Brian Seymour Warren MRCS LRCP, Physician.

== The Most Honourable Order of the Bath ==
=== Companions (CB) ===
Civil division

- Robert Temple Armstrong, Principal Private Secretary to the Prime Minister.

== Order of St Michael and St George ==
=== Knights Commander (KCMG) ===
- Anthony Henry Fanshawe Royle MP, Member of Parliament for Richmond, Surrey since 1959; Parliamentary Under Secretary of State, Foreign and Commonwealth Office 1970–74.

== Order of the Companions of Honour ==
=== Companions (CH) ===
- Rt Hon. Quintin McGarel, Baron Hailsham of Saint Marylebone QC, Lord High Chancellor of Great Britain 1970–74.

== Order of the British Empire ==
=== Dames Commander (DBE) ===
- Katharine Margaret Alice, The Honourable Mrs. MacMillan, Vice-Chairman of the Conservative Party 1968–71.
- Margot Smith, Chairman of the National Union of Conservative and Unionist Associations.

=== Commanders (CBE) ===
- Rt Hon. Patrick Robin Gilbert, Baron Derwent, Minister of State, Board of Trade 1962–63; Minister of State, Home Office 1963–64; Deputy Speaker, House of Lords.
- Alan Green, Member of Parliament for Preston South 1955–64 and 1970–74; Minister of State, Board of Trade 1962–63; Financial Secretary, Treasury 1963–64.
- Rt Hon. Pascoe Christian Victor Francis, Baron Grenfell TD, Deputy Speaker, House of Lords.
- The Honourable Douglas Richard Hurd MP, Member of Parliament for Mid-Oxon. Political Secretary to the Prime Minister 1970–74.
- Brendon Straker Sewill OBE, Special Assistant to the Chancellor of the Exchequer 1970–1974. Director of the Conservative Research Department 1965–70.
- Lena Moncrieff Townsend, Leader of the Inner London Education Authority, Greater London Council 1971–72.
- Joan Fleetwood Varley, Deputy Director of Organisation, Conservative Central Office since 1966.

=== Officers (OBE) ===
- Miles Matthew Lee Hudson, Political Secretary to the Rt Hon. Sir Alec Douglas-Home KT DL MP 1971–74.
- Lieutenant-Colonel William Reeve DL, for political and public services in the East Midlands.
- Ann Marcella Springman, for political and public services in Wessex.

=== Members (MBE) ===
- Roger Boaden, for political services.
- Rosemary Bushe, Personal Secretary to the Rt Hon. Edward Heath MBE MP.
- Captain Arthur William Potter Fawcett TD, for political services in Barnet, Hertfordshire.
- Christabel Phyllis Humphreys, for political services in Wales.
- Kenneth Donald Bremner Pryde, Inspector, Metropolitan Police.
- Peter Radford, Chief Inspector, Metropolitan Police.

=== British Empire Medal (BEM) ===
Civil division

- John Harris, Senior Messenger. Formerly Doorkeeper, No. 10 Downing Street.
- Ivy May Moore, lately Telephonist, No. 10 Downing Street.
- George Stanley Newell, Driver to the Rt Hon. Edward Heath MBE MP.
