= Joseph Colin Smith =

Joseph Colin Smith OBE (9 February 1931 - 28 October 2016), was a British urologist in Oxford. Earlier in his career, he assisted Alec Williams Badenoch in the prostate surgery on the then British Prime Minister, Harold Macmillan, at the King Edward VII's Hospital.
