= Alice Saxby =

Matron to King Edward VII's Hospital for Officers

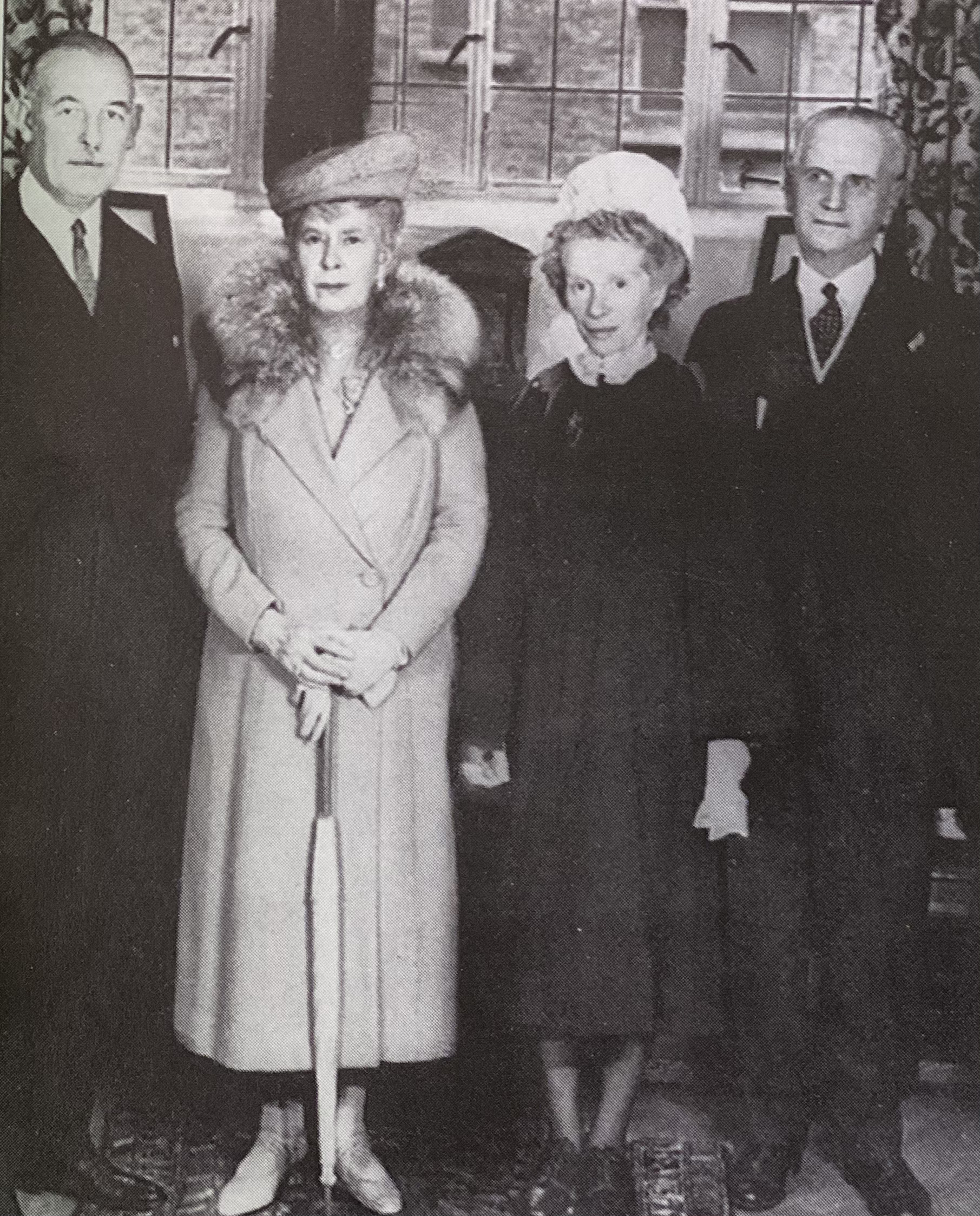
- Matron Alice Saxby with Queen Mary, Sir Harold Augustus Wernher and Sir George Ogilvie at the opening of King Edward VII's Hospital, October 1948 at Beaumont Street.
- Born: 1904; Maidenhead, Berkshire
- Died: 28 November 1987 (aged 82–83); Maidenhead, Berkshire
- Occupation: Nurse
- Known for: Matron to King Edward VII's Hospital for Officers (1948–1969)

Alice Saxby MVO (1904 – 28 November 1987) was a British nurse who was matron to King Edward VII's Hospital for Officers, London, from 1948 to 1969. She was previously in charge of an officer's wing at Botleys Mansion during the Second World War and cared for many casualties from the Normandy landings.

During her tenure at the hospital, she modelled herself on its founder, Sister Agnes, who had been matron before her, and she looked after, among others, Harold Macmillan and Field Marshal Viscount Montgomery of Alamein. Several members of the British royal family were cared for at the hospital during her time in office, including Princess Alexandra and Queen Elizabeth The Queen Mother.

In 1958, Saxby was made a Member of the Royal Victorian Order. She retired in 1969.

== Early life and career ==
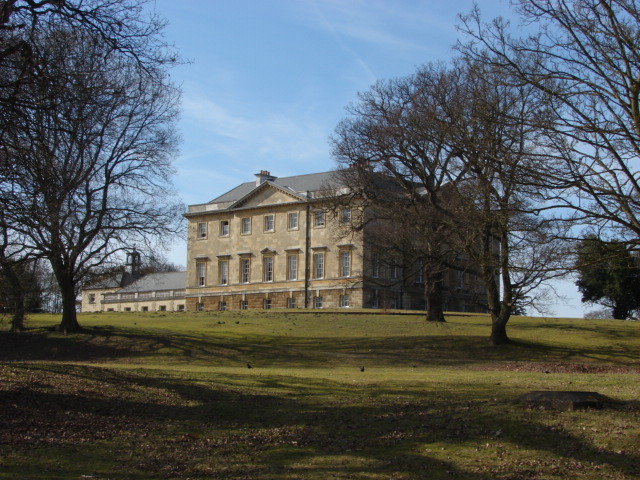
Botley Park Mansion, Chertsey

Alice Saxby, known by some as "Sax", was born in Maidenhead, Berkshire, in 1904. She completed her nursing training at St. Thomas's Hospital, London.

In January 1939, she was appointed to the nursing staff of the Queen Alexandra's Royal Army Nursing Corps. During the Second World War she was in charge of an officer's wing at St Thomas's Emergency Bed Service based at the former mental institution at Botleys Park, where she cared for many of the first casualties from the Normandy landings.

== Post-war career ==
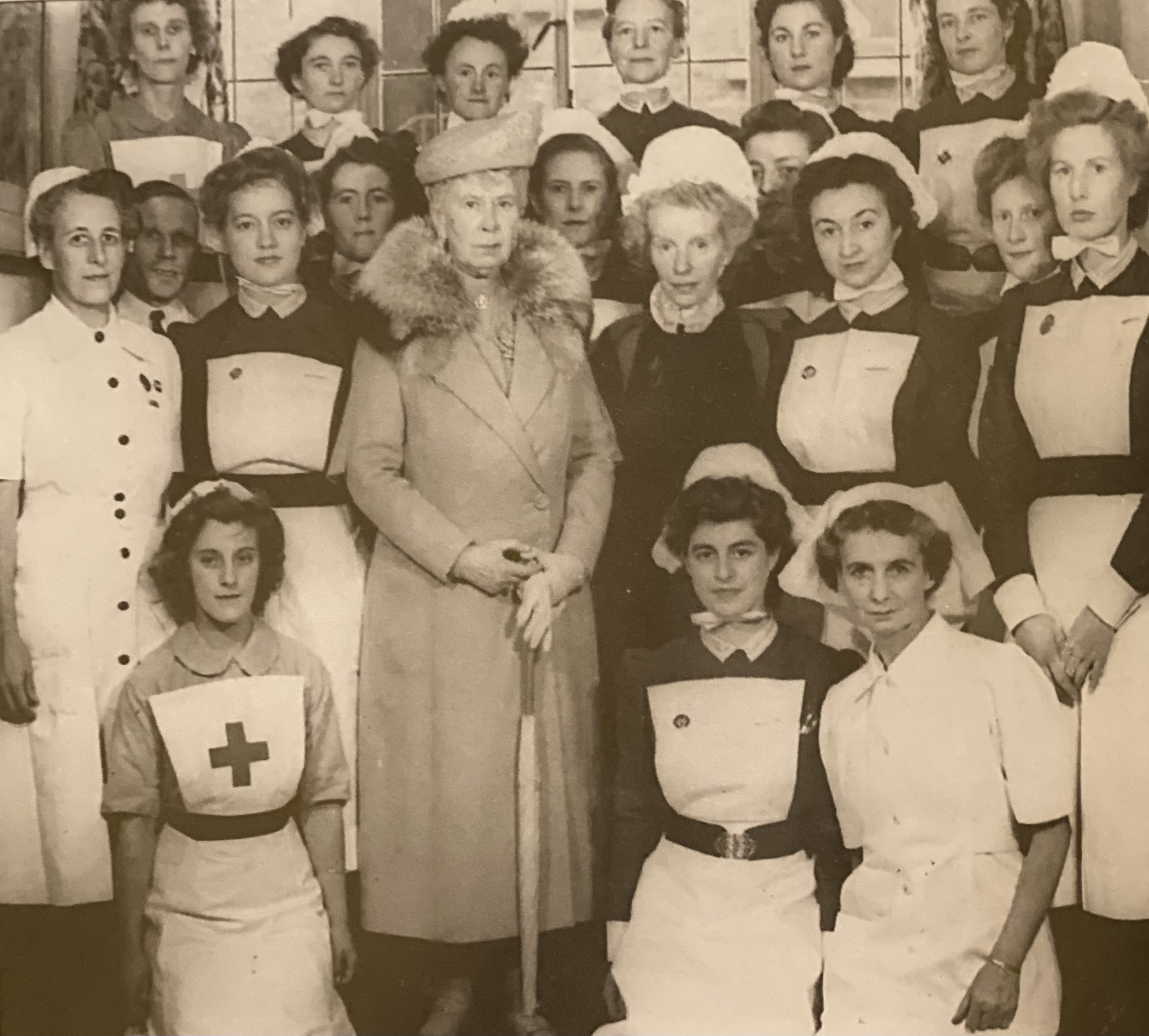
Matron Saxby and Queen Mary with the King Edward VII's Hospital nursing staff in October 1948.

In 1948, Saxby was appointed matron to King Edward VII's Hospital for Officers, London. Prior to 1940, Sister Agnes had been matron and between September 1940 and October 1948, the hospital had been closed. In October 1948, at the opening of the hospital at Beaumont Street, London, Saxby appeared in two official photographs; in one standing beside Queen Mary and surrounded by the nursing staff, and in the other standing with Queen Mary, Sir Harold Augustus Wernher, Lady Zia Wernher and Sir George Ogilvie. By 1949, the hospital could make claim to an elite medical and surgical staff, but, according to Richard Hough (in his book Sister Agnes, The History of King Edward VII's Hospital for Officers 1899 – 1999: "like Sister Agnes, Matron Alice Saxby did not allow them to get above themselves".

During Saxby's tenure at the hospital, she modelled herself on its founder Sister Agnes, and she looked after several members of the royal family. She arranged the nursing care of Prince Henry, Duke of Gloucester when he suffered a stroke. Others who were cared for at the hospital during her time in office included Harold Macmillan, Field Marshal Viscount Montgomery of Alamein in 1955, and Princess Alexandra who was admitted for the extraction of a wisdom tooth. In 1959, Edward Heath (British Prime Minister 1970–1974), was admitted with jaundice. The Queen Mother was treated for appendicitis, the Duke of Kent attended for a minor illness, and Prince Bertil, Duke of Halland, underwent a series of operations in 1961.

In 1958, Saxby was appointed a member of the Royal Victorian Order (MVO). She retired in 1969 and was succeeded by Margaret Dalglish. She was listed as a new member in the "Report of the Society of the Friends of St Georges and the Descendants of the Royal Knights of the Garter" (1980–1981).

== Recollections ==
Saxby appears in several memoirs. Princess Alice, Duchess of Gloucester, remembered that Saxby had been "a great admirer of Prince Henry from the days when he had been her President at King Edward's". A long-time physician at the hospital, Sir Brian Warren, recalled that Saxby "liked titles and I have never seen such a low curtsy, when this was called for - which was as often as possible. She liked titles even more than Sister Agnes did." Edward Heath wrote in his autobiography that during his earlier admission to King Edward's in 1959, "the matron appeared, a trim and imposing figure".

== Death ==
Saxby died at the age of 83 on 28 November 1987 at her home in Maidenhead. Her death was widely reported, including in an obituary in The Daily Telegraph which described her as "a neat precise woman with a soft light brown hair with a sharp wit; small in stature but tough". Dorothy Shipsey (later matron 1980–1994) reported that many attended the thanksgiving service for her life held at St James's Church, Spanish Place, including representatives of the royal family.

== Bibliography ==
- Hough, Richard (1998). Sister Agnes: The History of King Edward VII's Hospital for Officers 1899–1999. London: John Murray. ISBN 0-7195-5561-2
