= Badenoch (disambiguation) =

Badenoch is a traditional district of Scotland.

Badenoch may also refer to:

== People ==
- Alec Williams Badenoch (1903–1991), Scottish urologist
- Art Badenoch (1884–1972), American football player
- George Badenoch (1882–1915), Scottish football player
- Kemi Badenoch (born 1980), British politician
- Alexander Stewart, Earl of Buchan (1343–1394), known as the Wolf of Badenoch

== Other uses ==
- Badenoch & Clark, human resources provider
- Badenoch Group, geological formation
- Badenoch, Ontario, Canadian township
- Lord of Badenoch, Scottish title

== See also ==
- Joseph Badenoch Clearihue (1887–1976), Canadian lawyer, judge, academic and politician
