= Baron Strathalmond =

Barony in the Peerage of the United Kingdom

Baron Strathalmond, of Pumpherston in the County of Midlothian, is a title in the Peerage of the United Kingdom. It was created on 18 February 1955 for the businessman Sir William Fraser. He was chairman of the Anglo-Persian Oil Company (known as BP from 1954) from 1941 to 1956. His son, the second Baron, was managing director of the Kuwait Oil Company and a director of BP and later chairman of Govan Shipbuilders. As of 2017 the title is held by the latter's son, the third Baron, who succeeded in 1976.

== Barons Strathalmond (1955) ==
- William Fraser, 1st Baron Strathalmond (1888–1970)
- William Fraser, 2nd Baron Strathalmond (1916–1976)
- William Roberton Fraser, 3rd Baron Strathalmond (b. 1947)

The heir apparent is the present holder's son the Hon. William Gordon Fraser (b. 1976).
The heir apparent's heir apparent is his son William Harry Roberton Fraser (b. 2014).

=== Line of Succession ===
- William Fraser, 1st Baron Strathalmond (1888—1970)
  - William Fraser, 2nd Baron Strathalmond (1916–1976)
    - William Roberton Fraser, 3rd Baron Strathalmond (born 1947)
      - (1) Hon. William Gordon Fraser (b. 1976)
        - (2) William Harry Roberton Fraser (b. 2014)
        - (3) Alexander Arthur Charles Fraser (b. 2017)
      - (4) Hon. George Edward Fraser (b. 1979)

== Arms ==
Coat of arms of Baron Strathalmond
Crest In front of a bezant gutte d'huile a stag's head erased Proper. Escutcheon Tierce in pairle Azure Gules and Sable cinquefoils Or. Supporters Dexter a pheasant sinister a grouse Proper.
