= Agnes Keyser =

Wealthy English humanitarian and mistress of King Edward VII (1852–1941)

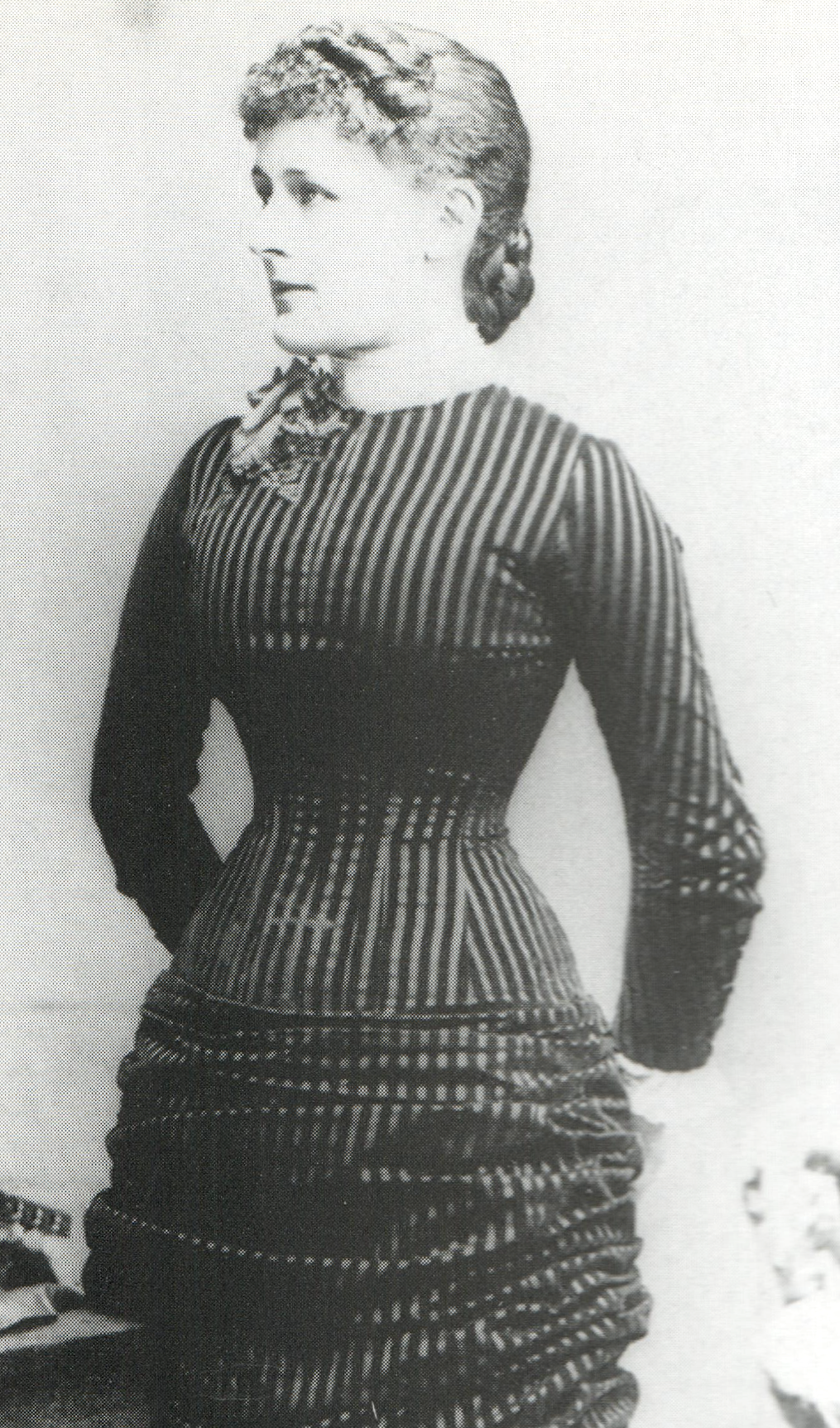
- Agnes Keyser as a young woman, c. 1870s
- Born: Elizabeth Agnes Keyser; 11 July 1852; Great Stanmore, Middlesex
- Died: 11 May 1941 (aged 88); Farringdon, Berkshire
- Known for: Mistress to Edward VII; Sister to King Edward VII's Hospital Sister Agnes
- Relatives: Charles Edward Keyser (brother)

Agnes Keyser, RRC (11 July 1852 – 11 May 1941) was a British humanitarian and longtime mistress to Edward VII, King of the United Kingdom. Keyser was the wealthy daughter of a Stock Exchange member. She remained with the King until his death in 1910.

Keyser, as recorded by author Raymond Lamont-Brown in his book Edward VII's Last Loves: Alice Keppel and Agnes Keyser, held an emotional bond with the King that others did not, due to her being unmarried herself, and preferring a more private affair to a public one.

== Early life and education ==
Agnes Keyser (pronounced Keeser), was born Elizabeth Agnes Keyser on 11 July 1852 at Great Stanmore in Middlesex, to Charles and Margaret Keyser. Her father was a partner in a stock exchange firm Ricardo and Keyser. Her ancestors were Jewish and arrived in Britain from Central Europe in the eighteenth century, and her ancestral country house was Cross Oak, Berkhamsted, Hertfordshire. Agnes was baptised as Christian. She had one brother, Charles Edward Keyser, and two sisters, the older Frances (Fanny) and the younger Marion. Her childhood home was Warren House, between the then two small towns of Stanmore and Bushey in Hertfordshire. While her brother went to Eton, the Keyser sisters, as was tradition at the time, were educated at home. Marion married early and little knowledge remains of her. However, Fanny and Agnes were close and when Fanny took to London's elite social life, Agnes Keyser followed. A large part of their father's fortune went to the two sisters and to give them a base in London he even bought them a large house in Chester Place, Hyde Park Square.

== Early years in London ==
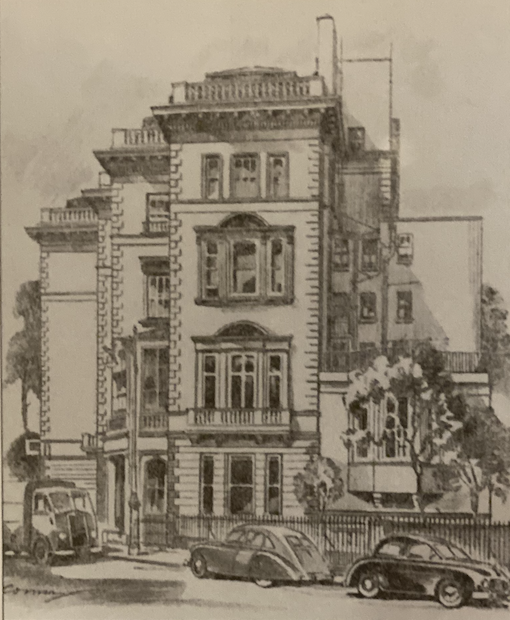
No.17 Grosvenor Crescent, the Keyser home and first King Edward VII's Hospital for Officers

The two sisters enjoyed the social scene in London, and their father subsequently bought them 17 Grosvenor Crescent, Hyde Park Corner, where they entertained guests and built up a friendship circle of "the best people". On 27 February 1898 both sisters attended dinner at the home of Alice Keppel and her husband George, and were introduced to the 56-year-old Prince of Wales. It was the start of a long friendship, which was to shortly see the effects of the Second Boer War. To support efforts in the war, many people came together to contribute, and on this background the Keyser sisters agreed to offer their Belgravia mansion to care for wounded officers, at the suggestion of the Prince of Wales.

== King Edward VII's Hospital for Officers ==
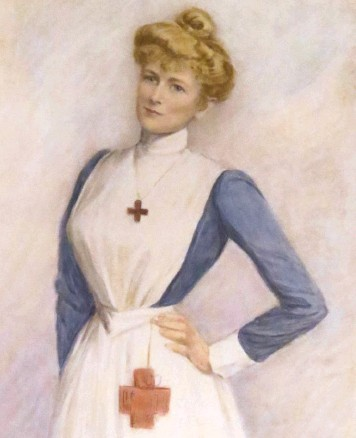
Agnes Keyser as "Sister Agnes"

At the suggestion of the Prince, Keyser became Sister Agnes, and the house at Grosvenor Crescent, with its initial 12 beds, greeted the first wounded officers in February 1900. In its early years it was known as Sister Agnes's Hospital.

During the First World War the hospital used 9 Grosvenor Gardens to nurse British officers, including future Prime Minister a Captain Harold Macmillan, the novelist Stuart Cloete. The hospital became King Edward VII's Hospital for Officers and later King Edward VII's Hospital Sister Agnes.

== Honours ==
On 26 February 1901, Agnes was created a Dame of Grace of the Venerable Order of St. John.

On 9 August 1901, Agnes and her sister were both awarded the RRC: Agnes for her hospital's work, and Fanny for direct nursing service in South Africa.

== Death ==
She died at Buckland House, Faringdon, Berkshire (later Oxfordshire) on 11 May 1941, aged 88.

== Bibliography ==
- Hough, Richard (1998). Sister Agnes: The History of King Edward VII's Hospital for Officers 1899-1999. London: John Murray. ISBN 0-7195-5561-2
- Lamont-Brown, Raymond (2011). Alice Keppel and Agnes Keyser: Edward VII's Last Loves. History Press. ISBN 978-0-7524-7394-9.
