= Basil Jackson =

British businessman

Captain Basil Rawdon Jackson
- Born: 20 May 1892; St John's, Newfoundland (now Canada)
- Died: 29 March 1957 (aged 64); London, England
- Education: Downside School; University of London
- Spouse: Marjorie Violet Warner (m. 1918)
- Military career
- Allegiance: United Kingdom
- Branch: British Army
- Service years: 1914–1922
- Rank: Captain
- Unit: Royal Garrison Artillery
- Conflicts: World War I

2nd Chairman of British Petroleum
- In office 1956–1957
- Preceded by: William Fraser
- Succeeded by: Sir Neville Gass

Captain Basil Rawdon Jackson (20 May 1892 – 29 March 1957) was a British businessman and second chairman of the board of British Petroleum from 1956 to 1957.

== Early life and education ==
Jackson was born in St John's, Newfoundland Colony, the son of Sir Henry Moore Jackson, a British colonial governor, and Emily Corbett Shea, daughter of Sir Edward Dalton Shea.

== Military service ==
In December 1915, Jackson was commissioned as a second lieutenant (on probation) in the Royal Garrison Artillery. He later held the rank of captain.

== Career ==
Jackson joined the (then) Anglo-Persian/Anglo-Iranian group in 1921 and became a director in 1948. He was working in the oil industry and living in New York City during the 1930 and 1940 Censuses. He later served as deputy chairman and, in 1956, succeeded William Fraser as chairman of British Petroleum.

== Chairman of British Petroleum ==
Jackson chaired BP during a period that included the immediate aftermath of the Suez Crisis and associated disruptions to oil transport routes to Europe. He retired at the end of January 1957. Neville Gass succeeded him as chairman later in 1957.

== Death ==
Jackson died in London on 29 March 1957, aged 64.
