= Neville Gass =

British businessman

Captain Sir Neville Gass KBE MC
- Born: Neville Archibald Gass; 14 May 1893; Madras, British India
- Died: 23 September 1965 (aged 72); London, England
- Education: Tonbridge School; McGill University
- Military career
- Allegiance: United Kingdom
- Branch: British Army
- Service years: 1914–1919
- Rank: Captain
- Units: Royal Field Artillery; Royal Horse Artillery
- Conflicts: World War I

3rd Chairman of British Petroleum
- In office 1957–1960
- Preceded by: Basil Jackson
- Succeeded by: Sir Maurice Bridgeman

Captain Sir Neville Archibald Gass KBE MC (14 June 1893 – 23 September 1965) was a British businessman. He was the third chairman of the board of BP from 1957 to 1960.

Gass was born in Madras, British India, to Horace Archibald Campbell Gass, who worked in the Forest Department, and Gertrude Louisa Martin. He was educated at Tonbridge School and at McGill University in Montreal. In the First World War, he served in the Royal Field Artillery and later in the Royal Horse Artillery, and for his services was awarded the Military Cross and the Belgian Croix de Guerre.

Shortly after the war, he joined BP, working first in London and then until 1934 in Persia. He was appointed managing director of BP in 1939, deputy chairman in 1956, and chairman in 1957. In 1960, he was succeeded by Maurice Bridgeman as chairman.

He was appointed a Commander of the Order of the British Empire (CBE) in 1953, and in 1958 was knighted (KBE) in the same order.

Gass died at the King Edward VII's Hospital for Officers, London, on 23 September 1965.
