= William Fraser, 1st Baron Strathalmond =

Scottish oilman

The Lord Strathalmond CBE
- Fraser in 1947
- Born: 3 November 1888; Glasgow, Scotland
- Died: 1 April 1970 (aged 81)
- Education: Glasgow Academy; Royal Technical College
- Spouse: Mary Roberton McLintock (m. 1913; died 1963)

1st Chairman of British Petroleum
- In office 1954–1956
- Succeeded by: Basil Jackson

William Milligan Fraser, 1st Baron Strathalmond CBE (3 November 1888 – 1 April 1970) was a Scottish oilman. Fraser served from 1941 to 1954 as the fourth and final chairman of the Anglo-Iranian Oil Company, and from 1954 to 1956 as the first chairman of British Petroleum.

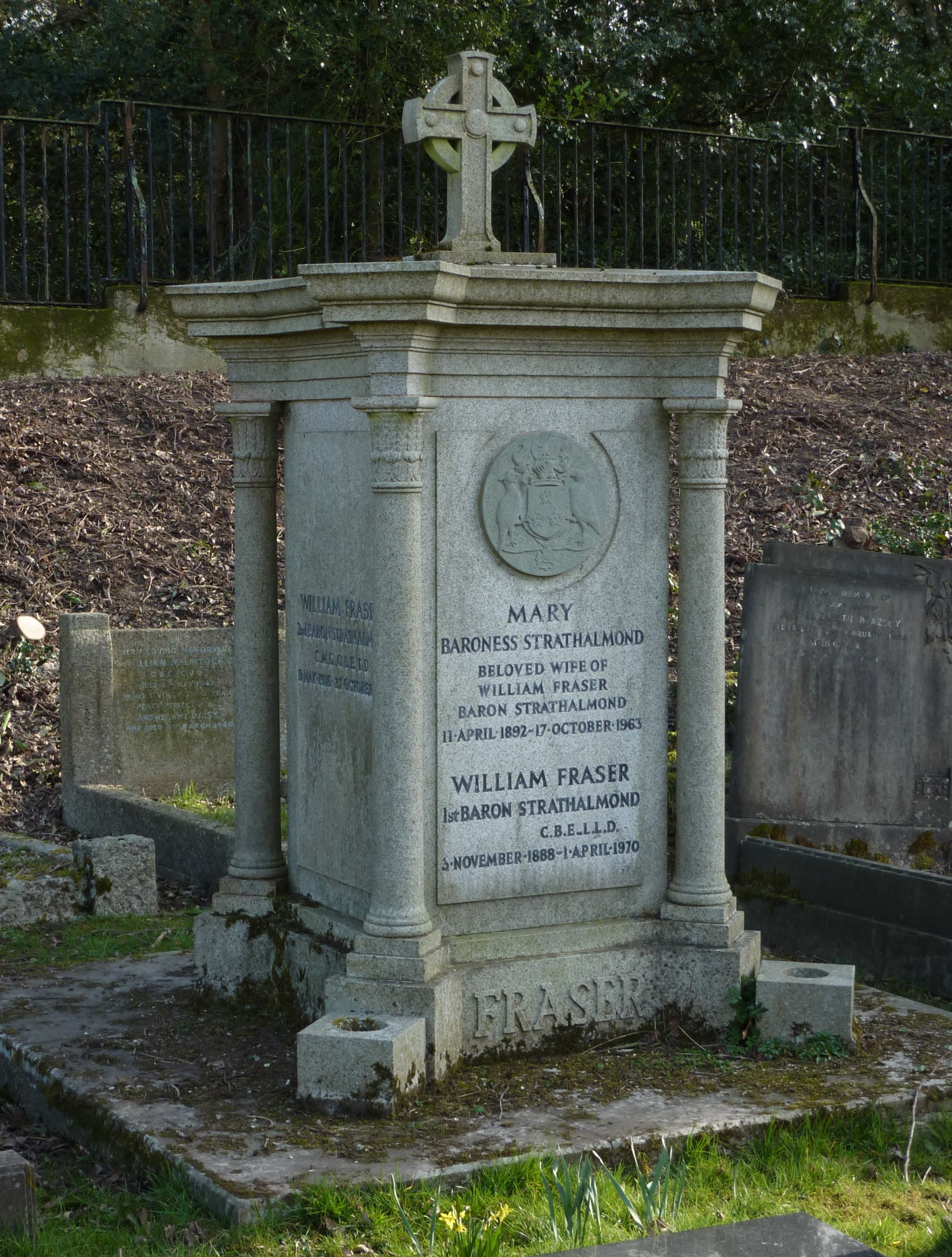
The Fraser's family grave at Putney Vale Cemetery, London, in 2015

== Biography ==
Fraser was the second son of William Fraser, of Glasgow, the founder of the Pumpherston Oil Company, and his wife Janet Loch. He joined his father's firm in 1909 and became a director in 1913 and joint managing director in 1915. He was appointed Commander of the Order of the British Empire (CBE) in 1918 for his work in increasing oil supply during the First World War. Fraser joined the board of the Anglo-Persian Oil Company in 1923. He became deputy chairman (to John Cadman) in 1928, and played a great role in expanding the oil production in Iran, Iraq and Kuwait, becoming known as a leading expert on Middle East oil. In 1941 he succeeded Cadman as chairman, a post he retained until 1956 (the firm was renamed the British Petroleum Company in 1954). Fraser was also an adviser on oil affairs to the British government for many years, notably as petroleum adviser to the War Office and as chairman of the Oil Advisory Committee.

During his tenure as chairman of the AIOC following the Second World War, Fraser's management of the Iranian concession became highly consequential. By 1950, neighboring oil agreements, such as the arrangement between the Arabian American Oil Company (ARAMCO) and Saudi Arabia, had shifted to a 50/50 profit-sharing model. Fraser, however, steadfastly refused Iranian demands to renegotiate the AIOC's terms to match this emerging market standard. Despite explicit warnings from the United States Department of State—notably from Assistant Secretary of State George C. McGhee, who traveled to London to personally urge Fraser to compromise to avoid radicalizing Iranian politics—Fraser maintained a rigid negotiating posture. Historians widely cite Fraser's intransigence as a primary catalyst for the Iranian parliament's decision to pass the 1951 oil nationalization law under Prime Minister Mohammad Mosaddegh. The resulting Abadan Crisis severely damaged the Iranian economy and ultimately set the geopolitical conditions for the 1953 Iranian coup d'état.

== Honours ==
After being appointed Commander of the Order of the British Empire in 1918, Fraser was knighted in 1939 and in 1955 he was raised to the peerage as Baron Strathalmond, of Pumpherston in the County of Midlothian.

== Marriage & Children ==
Lord Strathalmond married Mary Roberton McLintock (born 11 April 1892, died 17 October 1963), daughter of Thomas McLintock, in 1913. They had one son and one daughter:

- William Fraser, 2nd Baron Strathalmond (born 8 May 1916, died 27 October 1976)
- Hon Mary Joan Fraser (born 29 Oct 1922, died 6 March 2004)

Lord Strathalmond died in April 1970, aged 81. He was succeeded in the barony by his only son, William.

He is buried at Putney Vale Cemetery in South West London.

== Arms ==
Coat of arms of William Fraser, 1st Baron Strathalmond
Crest In front of a bezant gutte d'huile a stag's head erased Proper. Escutcheon Tierce in pairle Azure Gules and Sable cinquefoils Or. Supporters Dexter a pheasant sinister a grouse Proper.

Peerage of the United Kingdom
New creation	Baron Strathalmond; 1955–1970	Succeeded by William Fraser
