= William Fraser, 3rd Baron Strathalmond =

British hereditary peer (born 1947)

William Roberton Fraser, 3rd Baron Strathalmond (born 22 July 1947) is a British hereditary peer.

He was educated at Loretto School. In 1973, he married Amanda Rose Taylor. Their son William Gordon Fraser was born in 1976.

== Arms ==
Coat of arms of William Fraser, 3rd Baron Strathalmond
Crest In front of a bezant gutte d'huile a stag's head erased Proper. Escutcheon Tierce in pairle Azure Gules and Sable cinquefoils Or. Supporters Dexter a pheasant sinister a grouse Proper.

Peerage of the United Kingdom
Preceded by William Fraser	Baron Strathalmond; 1976–present	Incumbent heir apparent: William Gordon Fraser
