= Joseph Blomfield =

British anaesthetist

Joseph Blomfield (1 March 1870 - 9 November 1948), was a British anaesthetist who was on the list of honorary staff at King Edward VII for Officers. He was editor of the British Journal of Anaesthesia.
