= King Edward VII's Hospital =

Private hospital in Marylebone, London

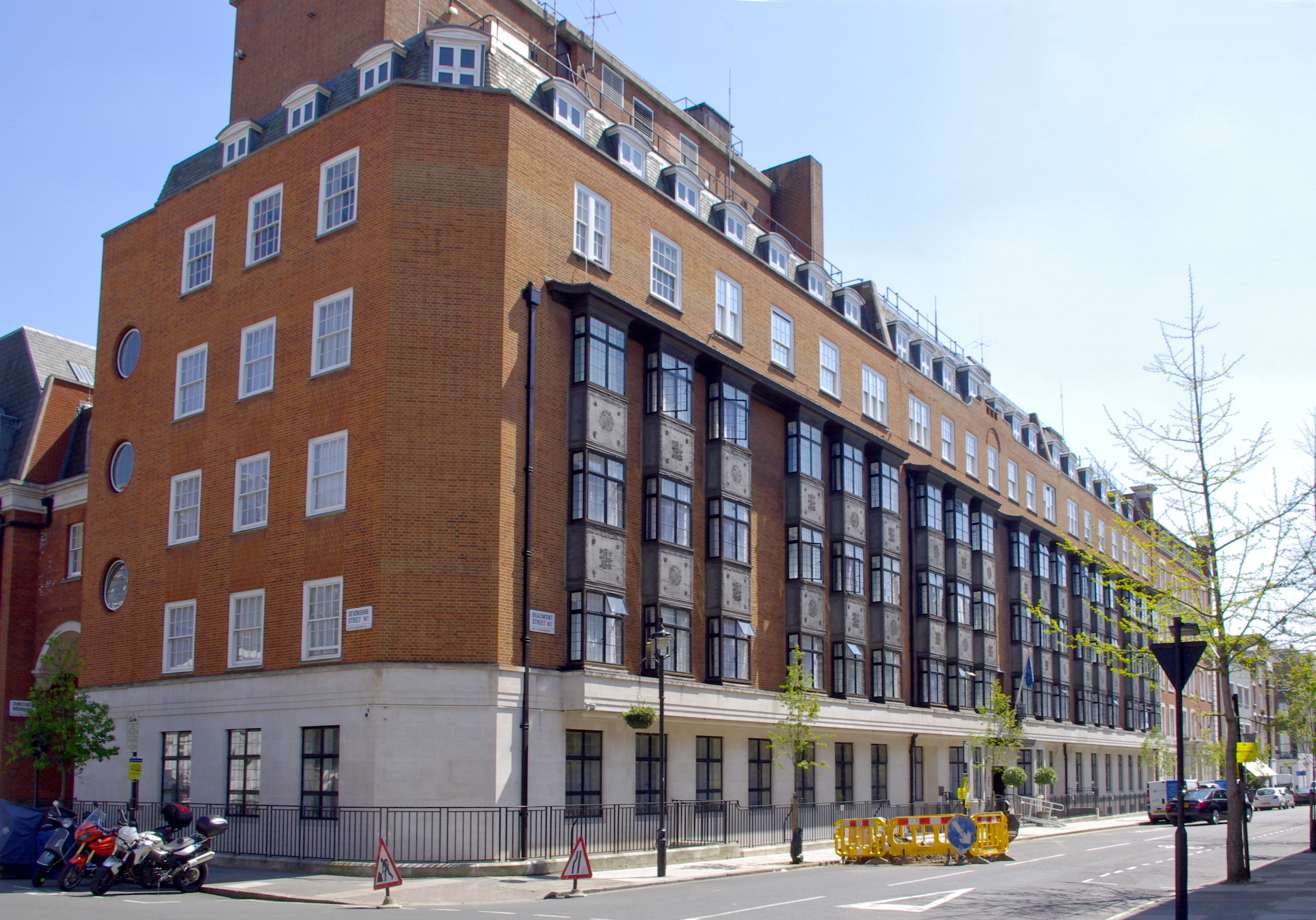
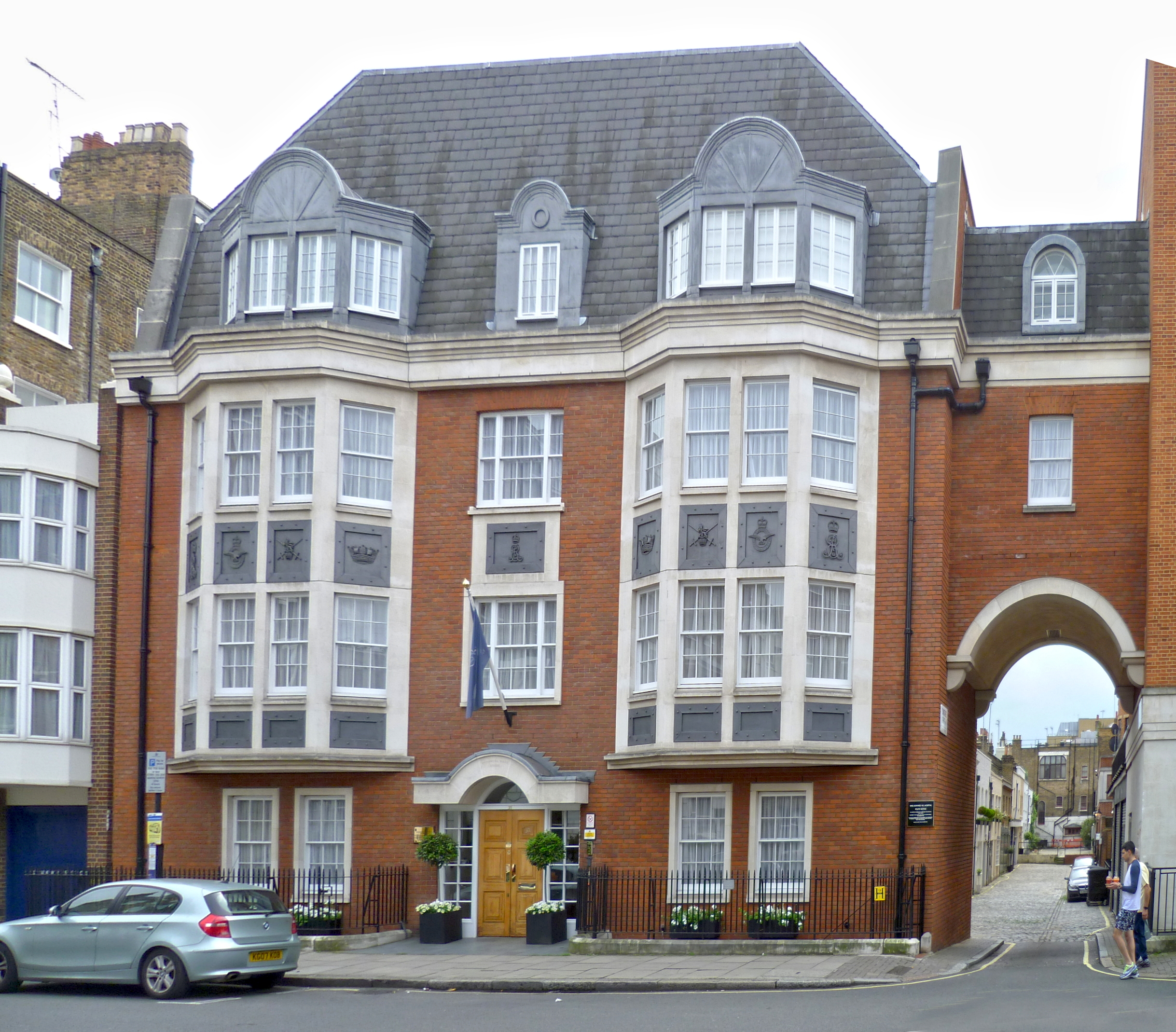
- Hospital buildings in Beaumont Street (top) and Devonshire Street (below)

- Location in Westminster

Geography
- Location: Westminster, Greater London W1; United Kingdom
- Coordinates: 51°31′15.3″N 0°9′1.5″W

Organisation
- Care system: Private
- Type: General; Registered charity (208944)
- Patron: Charles III

Services
- Emergency department: No
- Beds: 56

History
- Founded: 1899

Links
- Website: Official website

King Edward VII's Hospital (formal name: King Edward VII's Hospital Sister Agnes) is a private hospital located on Beaumont Street in the Marylebone district of central London.

Agnes Keyser, later known as Sister Agnes, established the hospital in her home at 17 Grosvenor Crescent in 1899 in the wake of the Second Boer War and at the suggestion of the Prince of Wales (later King Edward VII) who went on to become the hospital's patron. Its first intake of sick and mostly gunshot-wounded British Army officers arrived in February 1900.

The hospital continued to operate during peacetime. During the First World War it continued to specialise in treatment of wounded officers by a select group of honorary staff, drawn up by Sister Agnes and made up of eminent London surgeons of the time. Military personnel treated included the future prime minister Harold Macmillan who was injured in 1916. He was admitted again in 1963. In 1948, following the Second World War, the hospital moved to Beaumont Street where the current premises were opened by Queen Mary. It has also treated members of the British royal family.

In December 2012, the hospital received international media attention when, while Catherine, Duchess of Cambridge was staying there, two DJs from the Australian radio station 2Day FM made a hoax telephone call to the hospital. Soon afterwards, nurse Jacintha Saldanha, who had passed on the hoax call to the other nurse in the Duchess's private ward, was found dead.

The hospital has often been confused with the King Edward VII Hospital, Midhurst and the King's Fund.

== Foundation ==
The hospital was established in 1899, in the wake of the Second Boer War and at the suggestion of the Prince of Wales (later King Edward VII), the eldest son of Queen Victoria and Prince Albert. It was first located at 17 Grosvenor Crescent, the home of Agnes Keyser, whom he had met the previous year at the home of Alice Keppel, a mistress of the Prince. Keyser and her sister Fanny had inherited the house in Belgravia from their wealthy father, who was a member of the stock exchange. At the instruction of the Prince, Keyser assumed the role of matron under the title "Sister" and became known as "Sister Agnes".

The hospital, known simply as Sister Agnes's hospital, initially housed only 12 beds, a basic operating theatre and a staff of six carefully selected nurses, and admitted its first mostly gunshot wounded British Army officers in February 1900, a week after receiving a letter of gratitude from British Army officer General Evelyn Wood VC.

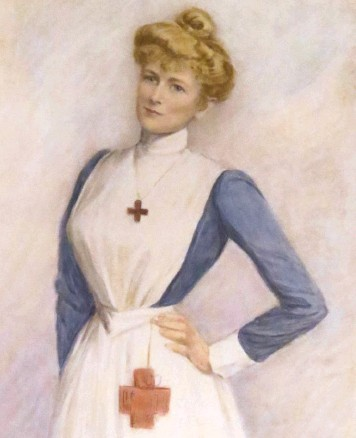
Agnes Keyser as "Sister Agnes"

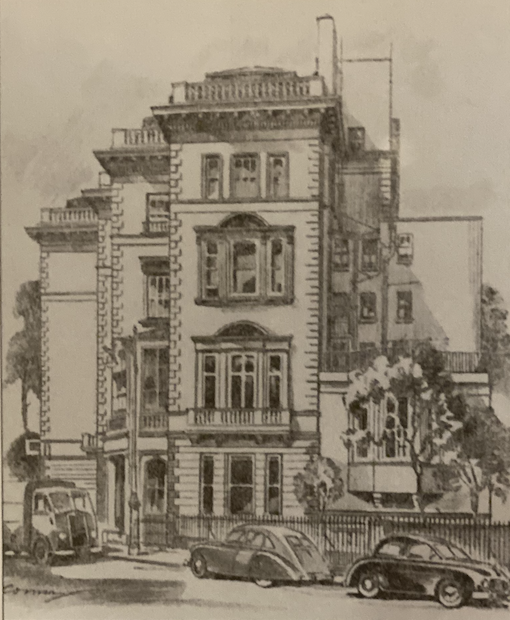
No.17 Grosvenor Crescent, the Keyser home and first King Edward VII's Hospital for Officers

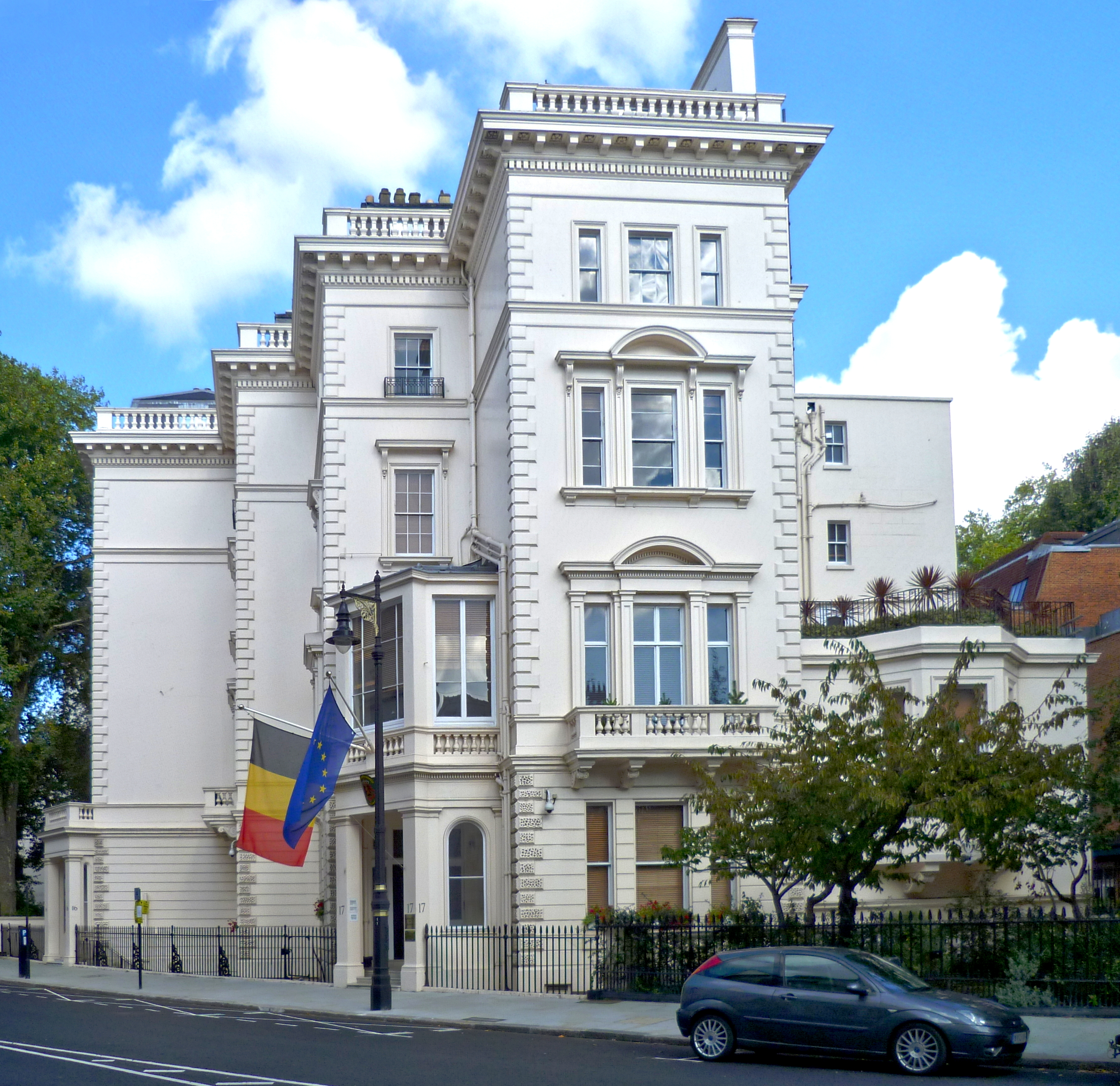
Original site of the hospital at 17 Grosvenor Crescent, now the Belgian Embassy

== 20th century ==
On the death of Queen Victoria in 1901, the Prince became King Edward VII and he subsequently became the hospital's first patron. On 9 August 1901, in recognition of their services to the wounded from South Africa, the king conferred the Royal Red Cross to both sisters. In 1904 the hospital was officially named King Edward VII's Hospital for Officers and continued to care for military officers during peacetime. The King became the hospital council's president and remained so until his death in 1910. That year, the hospital moved to 9 Grosvenor Gardens. In the same year, eight years after retiring from the Indian Medical Service with the rank of honorary Colonel, Peter Freyer became a member of the honorary medical staff of the hospital, and remained there until 1909, the same year in which the constitution of the hospital was modified.

=== First World War ===
The hospital had 16 beds in 1914, by which time, 1,500 officers had passed through. A few days before the onset of the First World War, Sister Agnes drew up a list of 21 honorary staff who would predominantly be the medical men of choice treating wounded officers at 9 Grosvenor Gardens without a fee. John Percy Lockhart-Mummery became a significant name on the list, probably carried out more operations at the hospital than any other surgeon there, and treated mainly gunshot wounds affecting the colon, rectum and anus. Others on the list included Sir William Hale-White, Farquhar Buzzard, Joseph Blomfield, George Lenthal Cheatle, and James Sherren, who almost lived at the hospital removing large numbers of bullets and shrapnel from wounded soldiers. John Thomson-Walker became urologist to the hospital and concentrated on injuries to the genitourinary tract, and for complex operations on the bones Sister Agnes would call upon Sir William Arbuthnot Lane.

During the First World War the young novelist Stuart Cloete was nursed at the hospital after being wounded at the Battle of the Somme. The future British Prime Minister, Harold Macmillan, was also wounded in the same battle and was treated at the hospital, where he underwent a series of long operations followed by recuperation there from 1916 to 1918. General Sir Joseph Howard Nigel Poett later recounted in his autobiography (1991) that Sister Agnes had arranged for his treatment to be transferred from Cambridge Hospital to King Edward VII's and that she "was a pretty powerful lady". Other officers treated at the hospital during the war have also recounted events of their stay. During the war, Margaret Greville opened up Polesden Lacey for the purpose of being a convalescent home linked to King Edward VII's Hospital for Officers.

=== Interwar ===
In 1930, the hospital was awarded a royal charter "to operate an acute Hospital where serving and retired officers of the Services and their spouses can be treated at preferential rates." The council first met on Armistice day of that year. From that date it was chaired by Sir Harold Augustus Wernher until 1969. In the interim the Duke of Gloucester became council president in 1936.

=== Second World War ===
Prior to 1940, Sister Agnes had been matron. In 1941 the interior of the building was badly damaged by bombing, and Sister Agnes died shortly afterwards. Between September 1940 and October 1948, the hospital had been closed.

=== Post-war ===
In 1948, Alice Saxby became the new matron, and the hospital moved to Beaumont Street, which had been renovated by the architect Thomas Bennett & Sons. It was officially opened on 15 October by Queen Mary. Mountbatten, upon hearing the names of previous members of council, put his own name forward and was elected a member in 1955. The general medical officer at the hospital, working closely with Saxby at the time was Brian Warren.

In 1962, the hospital became a registered charity. On 10 October 1963, at the hospital, Alec Badenoch, assisted by his juniors David Innes Williams and Joseph Smith, performed prostate surgery on Harold Macmillan. Eight days later, he was visited by Queen Elizabeth II, the second time a sovereign had visited a prime-minister on their sick bed. Princess Anne and the Queen Mother were both treated at the hospital the following year in 1964. In December 1966, the Queen Mother underwent an operation at the hospital, to remove a bowel tumour. In 1967, Princess Margaret appeared in headline news when she was admitted with acute tonsillitis.

Margaret Dalglish became matron in 1969, the same year that Prince Edward, Duke of Kent became the hospital's president. The council was chaired by Sir David Luce from 1969 to 1971, and Lord Elworthy from 1971 to 1978. In the interim Prince Edward, Duke of Kent became president of council, and it was subsequently chaired by Sir Peter Hunt from 1978 to 1987, and Sir Henry Leach from 1987 to 1998, when Lord Craig took over. During this time, fundraising was led by Commander Sir Jameson Adams, Admiral Sir Alan Scott Moncrieff and then Air Chief Marshal Sir Edmund Hudleston. The Queen Mother made headlines again in 1984 when she was admitted for removal of a fishbone.

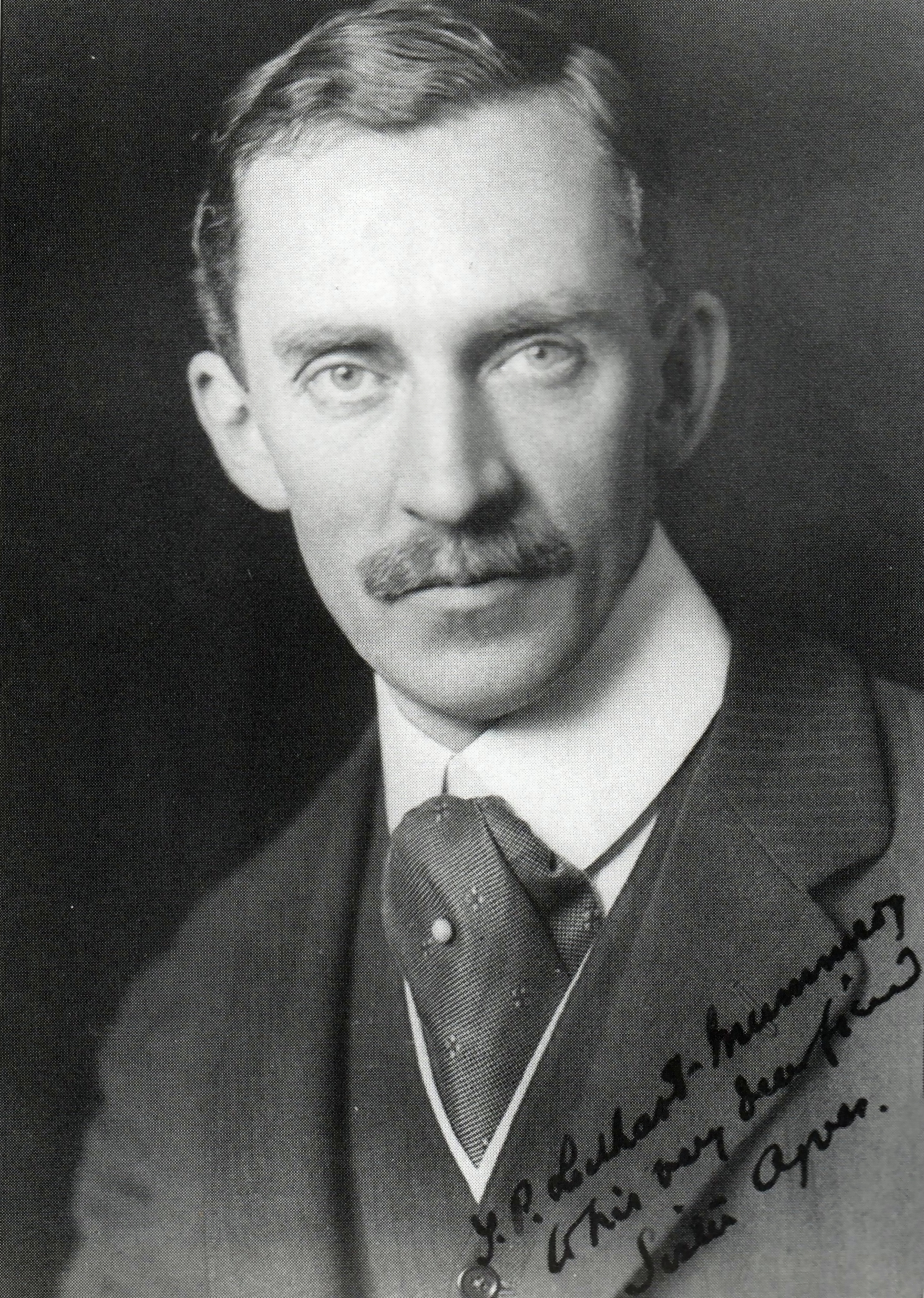
John Percy Lockhart-Mummery, who operated during the First World War.

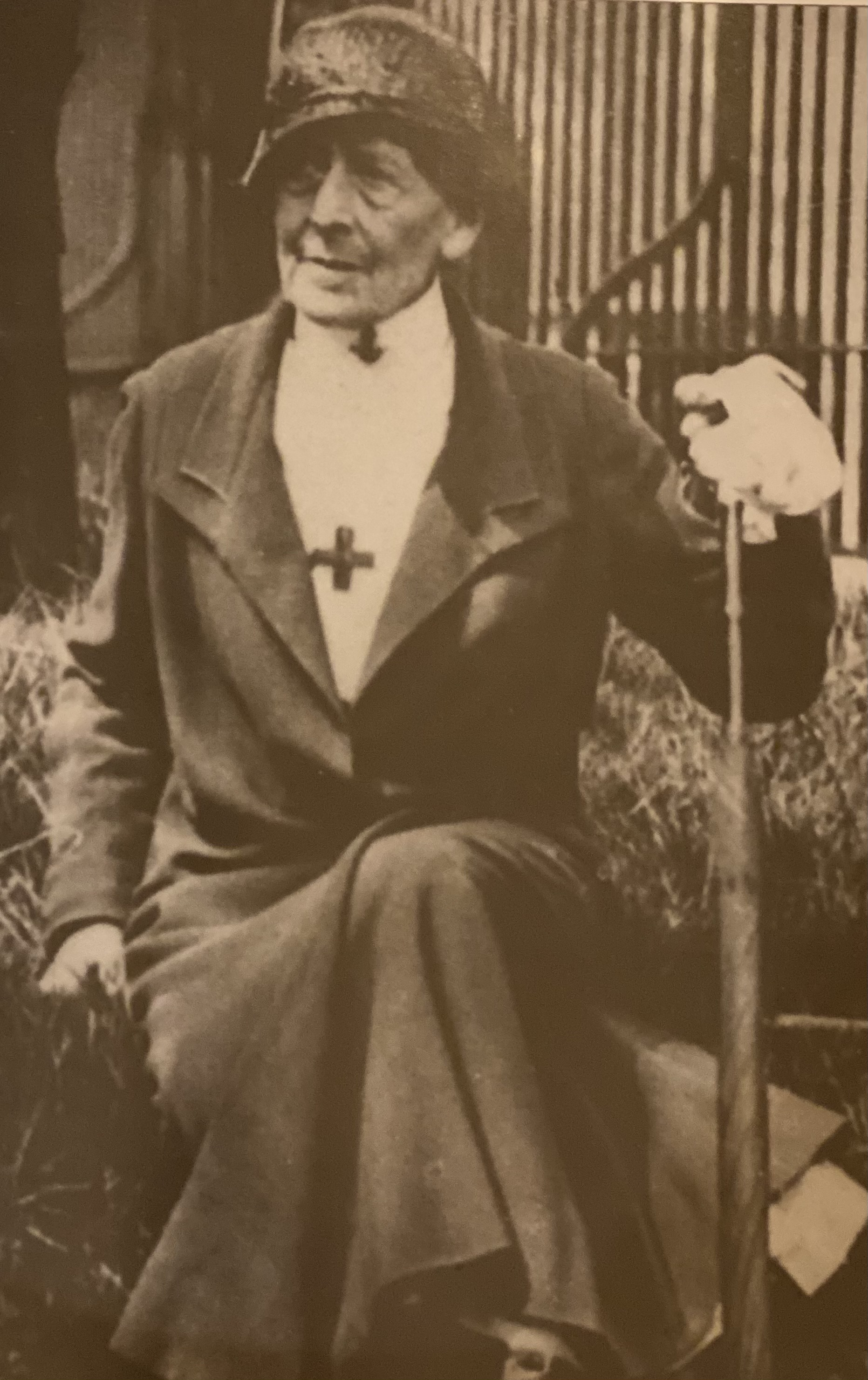
Sister Agnes in later life

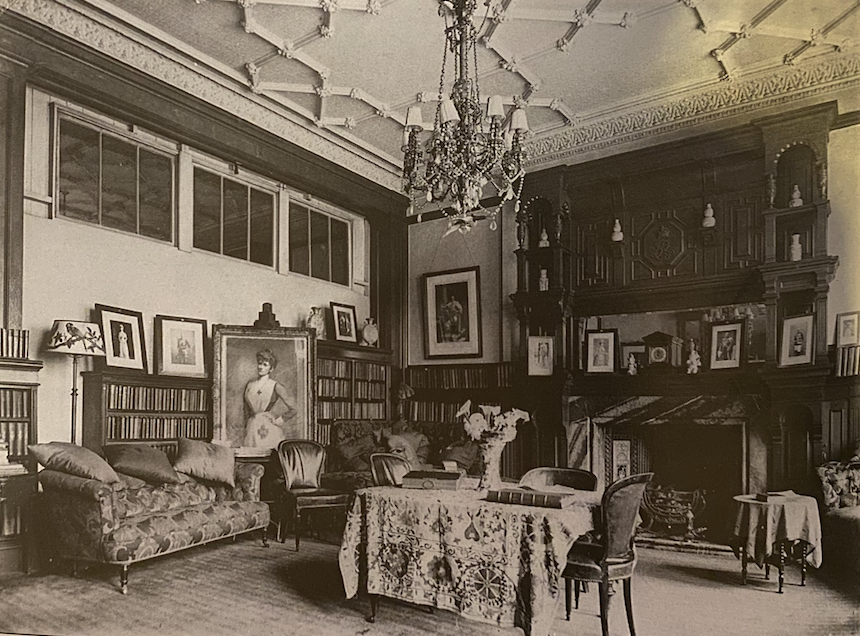
The patient's sitting room at 9 Grosvenor Gardens

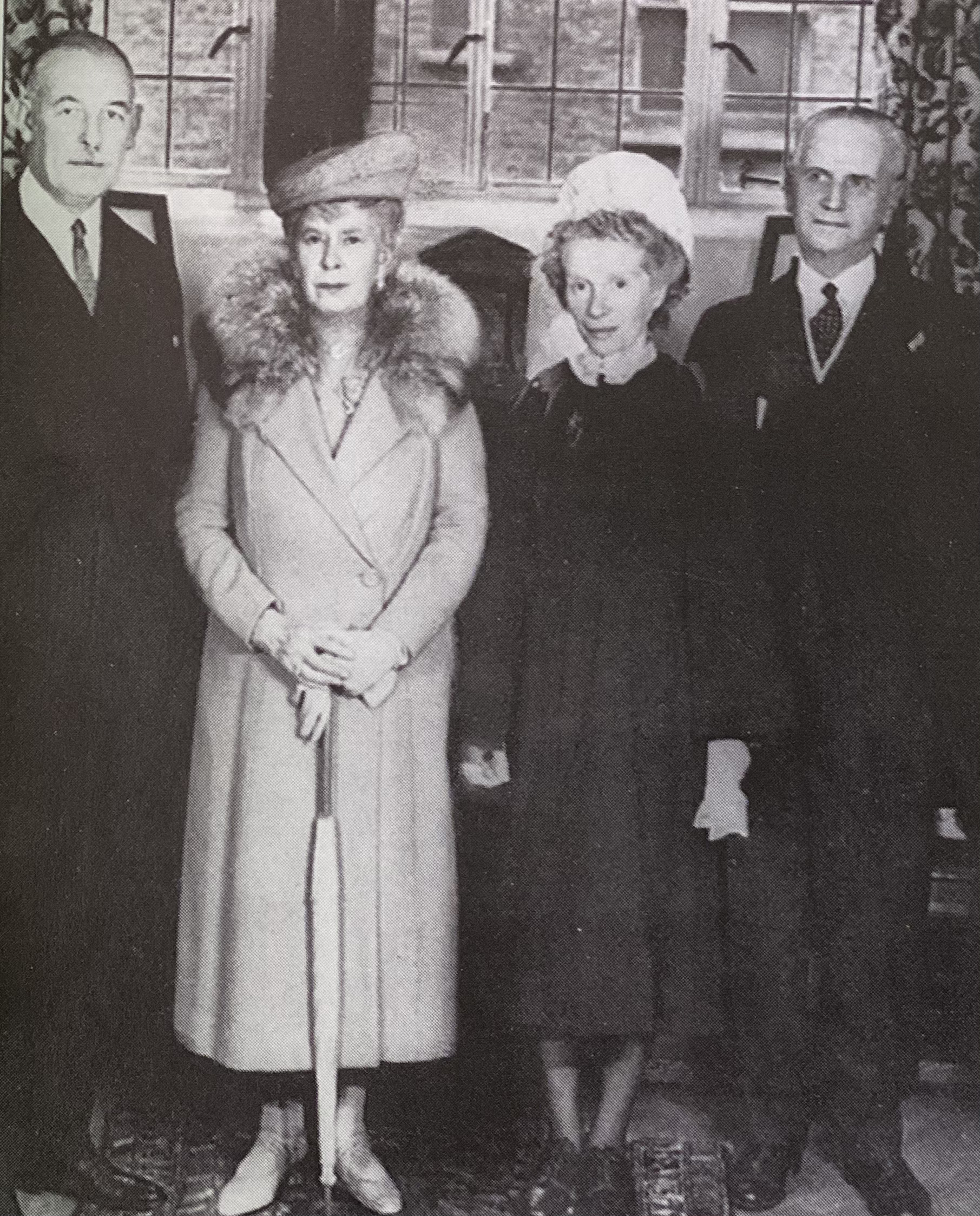
Queen Mary with Matron Saxby, Sir Harold Wernher and Sir George Ogilvie. 1948

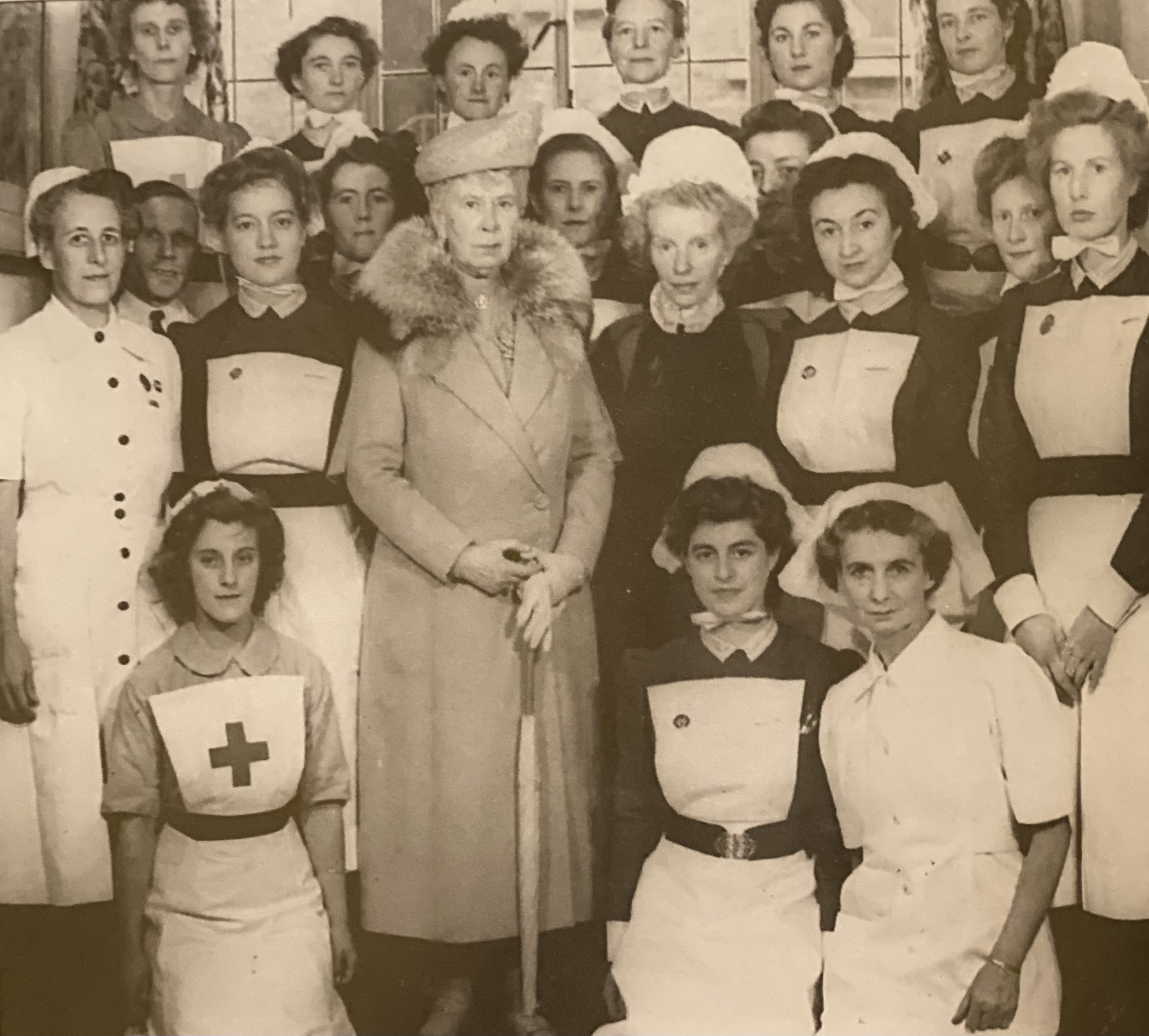
Queen Mary and Matron Saxby with the nursing staff (1948).

== 21st century ==
The hospital works with the Wellington Barracks and with the Ministry of Defence, and has treated wounded officers of the War in Afghanistan and the Iraq War. It has continued to support the treatment of all ranks of former servicemen, as well as the general public. Through the hospital's Sister Agnes Benevolent Fund, active or retired personnel in the British armed services, as well as their spouses, can receive a means tested grant that can cover up to 100% of their hospital fees. It has a pain management programme for veterans.

In 2009, the year of the 40th anniversary of Prince Edward being president, the Michael Uren Foundation provided funds for a CT scan and the radiological information system was installed that same year. The following year, the four-bed Michael Uren critical care unit for high dependency and intensive care was opened by the Prince with the purpose of providing ventilation, haemofiltration and renal replacement therapy.

Lord Stirrup has been on the Advisory Board of the hospital since 2016. By 2018 there were 56 rooms and the hospital was treating over 4,000 people a year. The hospital has more than 80 surgeons, operates with the WHO Surgical Safety Checklist, and its Theatre Officers Committee, made up of 12 surgeons, representing various surgical specialties, two anaesthetists, four nursing staff and the Chief Executive, meet quarterly. In 2018, the CQC noted the hospital to have three operating theatres, a level three critical care unit, and radiology, outpatient and diagnostic facilities. The use of the hydrotherapy pool, treatment of fractures, management of pain, and rehabilitation are available to injured soldiers.

In December 2012, the hospital received international media attention when Catherine, Duchess of Cambridge was admitted, suffering from hyperemesis gravidarum. While the Duchess was staying at the hospital, two DJs from the Australian radio station 2Day FM made a hoax telephone call to the hospital, pretending to be Queen Elizabeth II and Prince Charles. Two days later, nurse Jacintha Saldanha, who had worked just over four years at the hospital and had passed on the hoax call to the other nurse in the Catherine, Duchess of Cambridge's private ward, was found dead. The incident has highlighted the sensitivity of reporting news of suicide and the vulnerability of healthcare workers while investigations are carried out following serious events.

== Death of Sir Michael Harris Caine ==
On 7 February 1999 the businessman and Booker Prize founder Sir Michael Caine fell into a coma after staff were unable to clear a blocked breathing tube. He died five weeks later. A leading intensive care specialist concluded that the possibility of death would have been "minimal" had staff at the hospital received proper training.

Sir Michael's widow, Baroness Emma Nicholson, claims that nurses refused to call consultants and doctors despite her husband's distress. The Baroness also claimed that a subsequent operation on her husband took place at an NHS hospital because the King Edward VII "could not cope." In September 1999 the Guardian reported that Baroness Nicholson was due to pursue legal action against the hospital alleging negligence. In light of her husband's death, Baroness Nicholson said:

I find it repugnant that NHS beds should be used as a final resource by the private hospitals who set themselves up as being able to cope and yet demonstrably cannot. I don't see why the NHS resource should be leached away in this way.

== Notable patients ==
The hospital has been used by various members of the British royal family, including Queen Elizabeth II, Queen Elizabeth the Queen Mother, Princess Margaret, Countess of Snowdon, Prince Philip, Duke of Edinburgh, Catherine, Duchess of Cambridge, King Charles III, Queen Camilla and Sarah, Duchess of York. In February 2002, Princess Margaret died at the age of 71 at the hospital, after suffering a stroke.

Hugh Ray Easton, designer of stained glass windows, who was commissioned to design the Rolls-Royce Battle of Britain Memorial Window, died at the hospital in 1965. Neville Gass died in the hospital in the same year. Kenneth Diplock, Baron Diplock died there in 1985, and Enoch Powell in 1998.

In December 2013 it was announced that the hospital had received a donation of £30 million from the businessman, Michael Uren. In October 2014 Zambian president Michael Sata died at the age of 77 at the hospital, after receiving treatment for an undisclosed illness.

== Office holders ==
=== Chief executives ===
Formerly known as the house governor.

- Sir George Drummond Ogilvie (1938–1950)
- Vere, Lady Birdwood (1950–1972)
- K. B. Smith (1972–1985)
- Commander I. K. Brooks (1985–1992)

=== Others ===
- Lieutenant General Sir Bill Rollo
- Sir Jameson Boyd Adams

== See also ==
- List of honorary medical staff at King Edward VII's Hospital for Officers

== Bibliography ==
- Hough, Richard (1998). Sister Agnes: The History of King Edward VII's Hospital for Officers 1899-1999. London: John Murray. ISBN 0-7195-5561-2
- Shawcross, William (2013). Queen Mother: The Selected Letters of Queen Elizabeth the Queen Mother: Part 4. Pan Macmillan. ISBN 978-1-4472-5588-8.
- Thorpe, D. R. (2010). Supermac: The Life of Harold Macmillan. Pimlico. ISBN 978-1-84413-541-7.
