= Jameson Adams =

British Antarctic explorer (1880–1962)

Captain Sir Jameson Adams KCVO CBE DSO RD
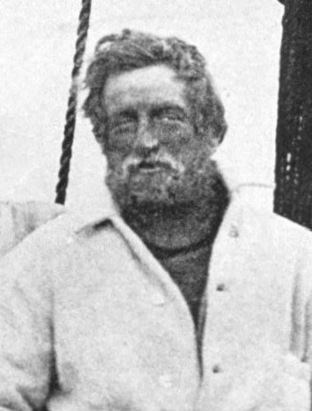
- Born: Jameson Boyd Adams; 6 March 1880; Rippingale, Lincolnshire, England
- Died: 30 April 1962 (aged 82); Westminster, London, England
- Burial place: Golders Green Crematorium
- Awards: Commander of the Order of the British Empire (1928); Knight Commander of the Royal Victorian Order (1948)
- Military career
- Allegiance: United Kingdom
- Branch: Royal Navy
- Service years: 1895–1918; 1939–1945
- Rank: Captain
- Wars: First World War; Second World War

Sir Jameson Boyd Adams KCVO CBE DSO RD (6 March 1880 – 30 April 1962) was a British Antarctic explorer and Royal Naval Reserve officer. He participated in the Nimrod expedition, the first expedition led by Ernest Shackleton in an unsuccessful attempt to reach the South Pole.

== Biography ==
Born in Rippingale, Lincolnshire, the son of a doctor and the grandson of a captain in the Indian Navy, he ran away from school to enter the merchant navy at the age of 13. In 1902 he became a sub-lieutenant in the Royal Naval Reserve, and on reaching the rank of Lieutenant he was one of the last to gain a Master Mariner's certificate under sail. But he gave up a promising career to join Ernest Shackleton as the second-in-command of the Nimrod Expedition. Despite the expedition's ultimate failure, he was one of the party of four who reached the Polar Plateau for the first time ever, thus showing the way to the Pole. On 9 January 1909 they attained a Furthest South of 88°23′S 162°00′E, just 97 miles (156 km) from the South Pole, when they were forced by impending starvation to turn back.

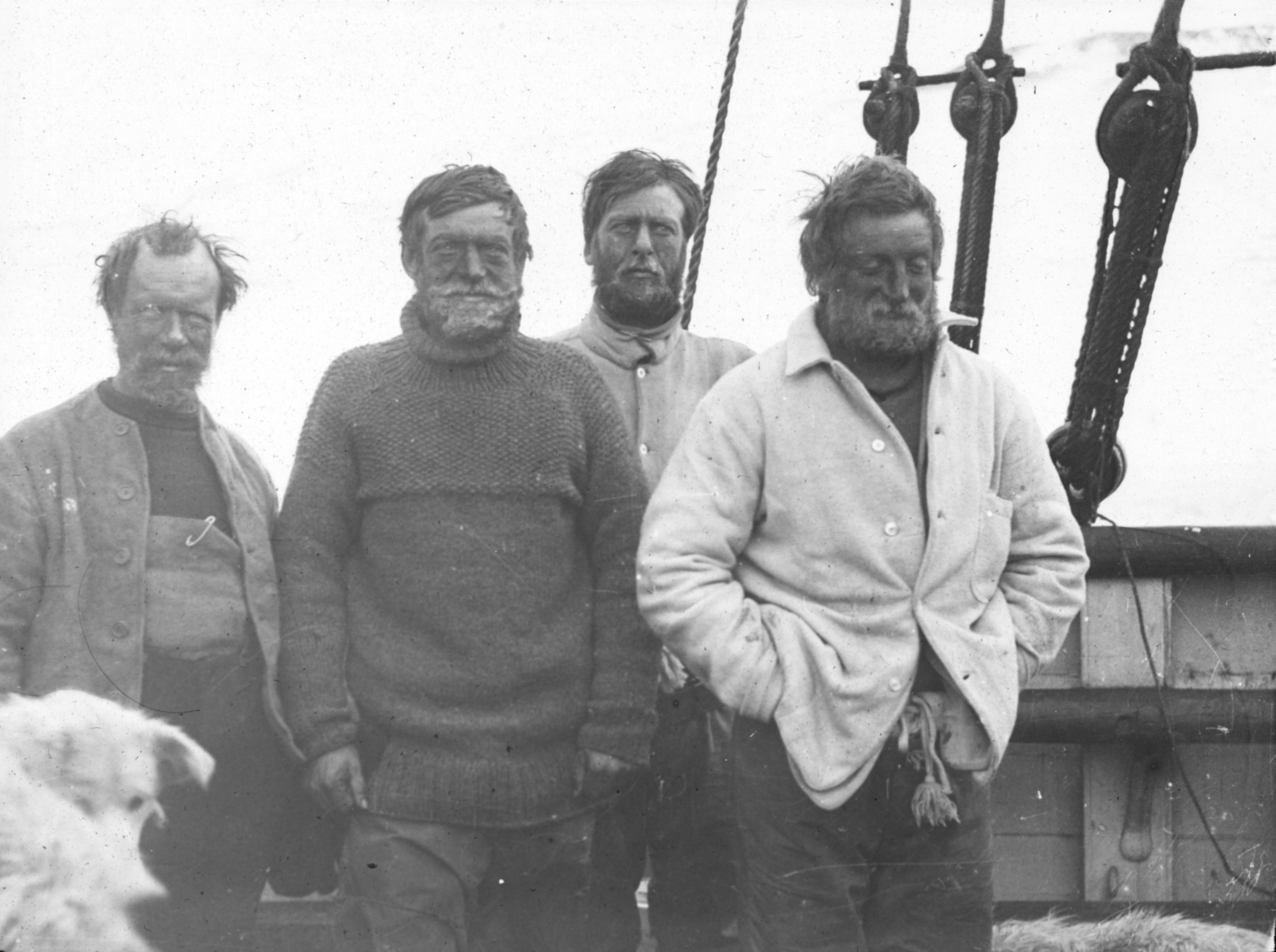
L-R: Frank Wild, Ernest Shackleton, Eric Marshall and Adams in 1909, after their polar trek

On his return from the Antarctic in 1909, he entered the Civil Service, where a year later he was appointed head of the North-Eastern Division of the Employment Exchanges. Recalled to the Navy on the outbreak of the First World War, he became Flag Lieutenant to Admiral Hood commanding the Dover Patrol. Then, after a period of special work at the Ministry of Munitions, he was posted to Flanders to command a battery of naval siege guns. A bad wound in the head necessitated his return in 1917, and he was appointed a Companion of the Distinguished Service Order and awarded the Croix de Guerre for his services.

After the war, he returned to the Ministry of Labour as Controller for the North-Eastern Division, and such spare time as he had was largely devoted to helping boys' clubs. In the 1928 Birthday Honours he was appointed a Commander of the Order of the British Empire (CBE). He left the service in 1935 to become Secretary of King George's Jubilee Trust for youth. He remained in this post, apart from further distinguished service in the Second World War. During the Second World War he was sent to Gibraltar in May 1942 with the rank of Captain RN, as Chief of the Contraband Control Service, he left Gibraltar in 1944 with the rank of Commander RN. He continued with King George's Jubilee Trust for youth until his retirement in 1948, when he was knighted in the Royal Victorian Order.

He lived above Pratt's and became the honorary appeals secretary for King Edward VII's Hospital for Officers, where he worked right up to his death in 1962.

== Character and legacy ==
In appropriate company, his use of somewhat crude invective was often unrestrained, and he was never deterred by convention from saying what he thought. He preferred to be known by allcomers, from porters to the royal family, simply as "The Mate".

In November 2008, 100 years after the Nimrod Expedition began, one of "The Mate's" great-grandsons, Henry Adams, set off from the Shackleton Hut with two other members of the Shackleton Centenary Expedition to complete the whole 800 nautical miles (1,500 km) to the South Pole on foot, hauling their own supplies, unassisted. In January 2009, another of "The Mate's" great-grandsons, David Cornell, joined the Expedition at the Farthest South 88°23′S 162°00′E to complete the last 97 miles (156 km) of unfinished family business.
