= Josephine Barnes =

British obstetrician and gynaecologist

Dame Josephine Barnes DBE
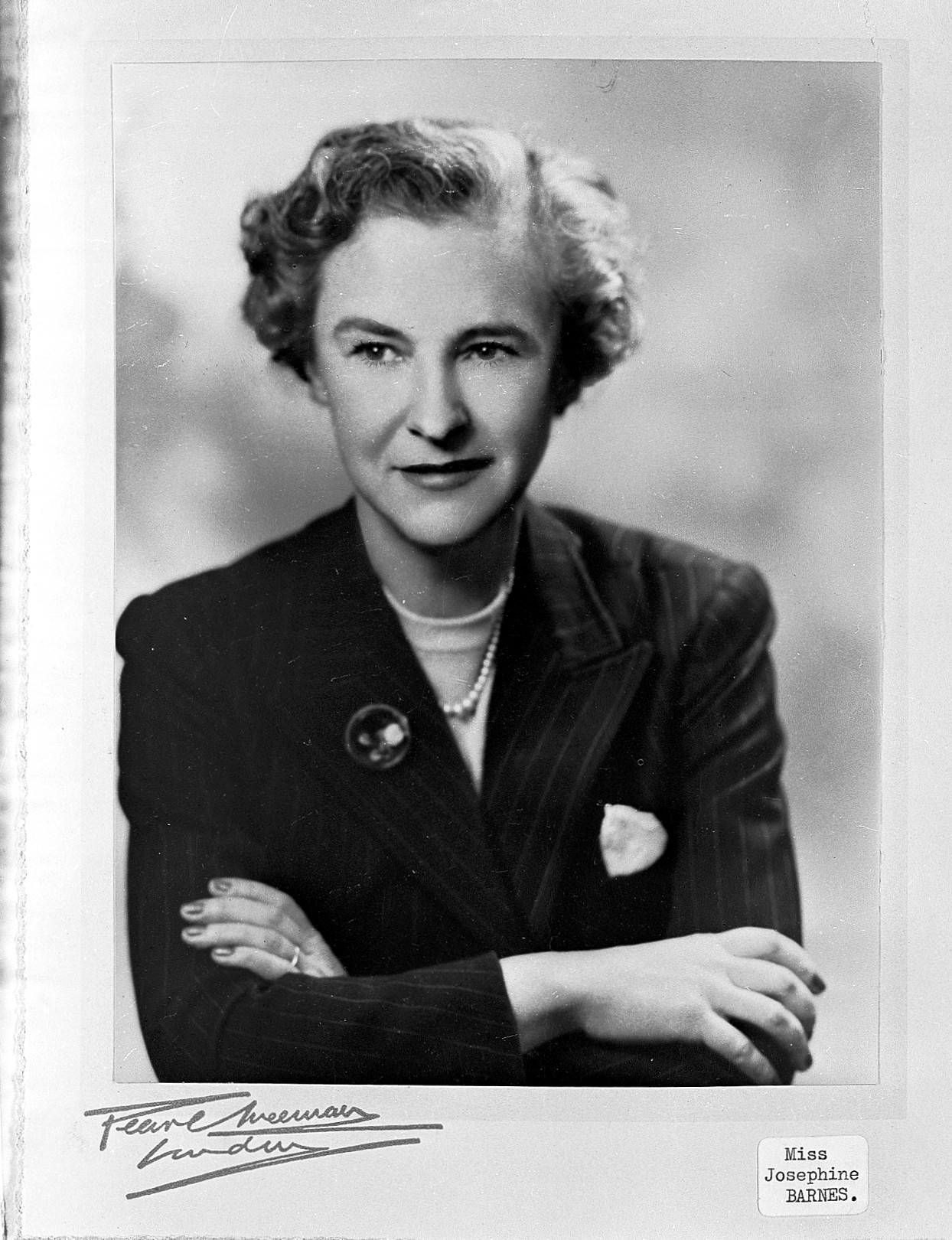
- Born: Alice Josephine Mary Taylor Barnes; 18 August 1912
- Died: 28 December 1999 (aged 87)
- Education: Oxford University University College London
- Occupation(s): Obstetrician and Gynaecologist
- Known for: First female president of BMA
- Spouse: Sir Brian Warren
- Children: 3

Dame Alice Josephine Mary Taylor Barnes, DBE (18 August 1912 – 28 December 1999), known professionally as Dr Josephine Barnes, was a leading English obstetrician and gynaecologist. She was the first female president of the British Medical Association, 1979. Barnes was active in the Women's National Cancer Control Campaign with cancer screening.

== Early life and education ==
She was born on 18 August 1912, the eldest of five children of Methodist minister Walter Wharton Barnes and Alice Mary, née Ibbotson. She was born at Cliff Road, Sheringham, Norfolk and educated at Oxford High School in North Oxford and the University of Oxford, reading Natural Sciences at Lady Margaret Hall. She then studied medicine at University College London.

== Career ==
When the Second World War started, she was appointed to a post at the Samaritan Hospital. From 1947 she ran a mobile obstetric team from University College Hospital. Barnes was the first woman consultant obstetrician and gynaecologist at Charing Cross Hospital (1954) and the first woman President of the British Medical Association (1979–80).

She was also Chairman of the Elizabeth Garrett Anderson Hospital Appeal Trust, President of the Association of Chartered Physiotherapists in Obstetrics and Gynaecology (known since 1994 as the Association of Chartered Physiotherapists in Women's Health) from 1977 to 1995, and President of the Royal British Nurses' Association. She took a prominent role in the public debate over the 1967 Abortion Act.

In 1988, she became president of the Osler Club of London. In 1994, she delivered the Hunterian Oration at the Hunterian Society. Between 1995 and 1996, Barnes was president of the History of Medicine Society at the Royal Society of Medicine. She was a Fellow of the Royal College of Physicians, the Royal College of Surgeons of England, and the Royal College of Obstetricians and Gynaecologists (of which she was at one time Vice-President).

== Marriage ==
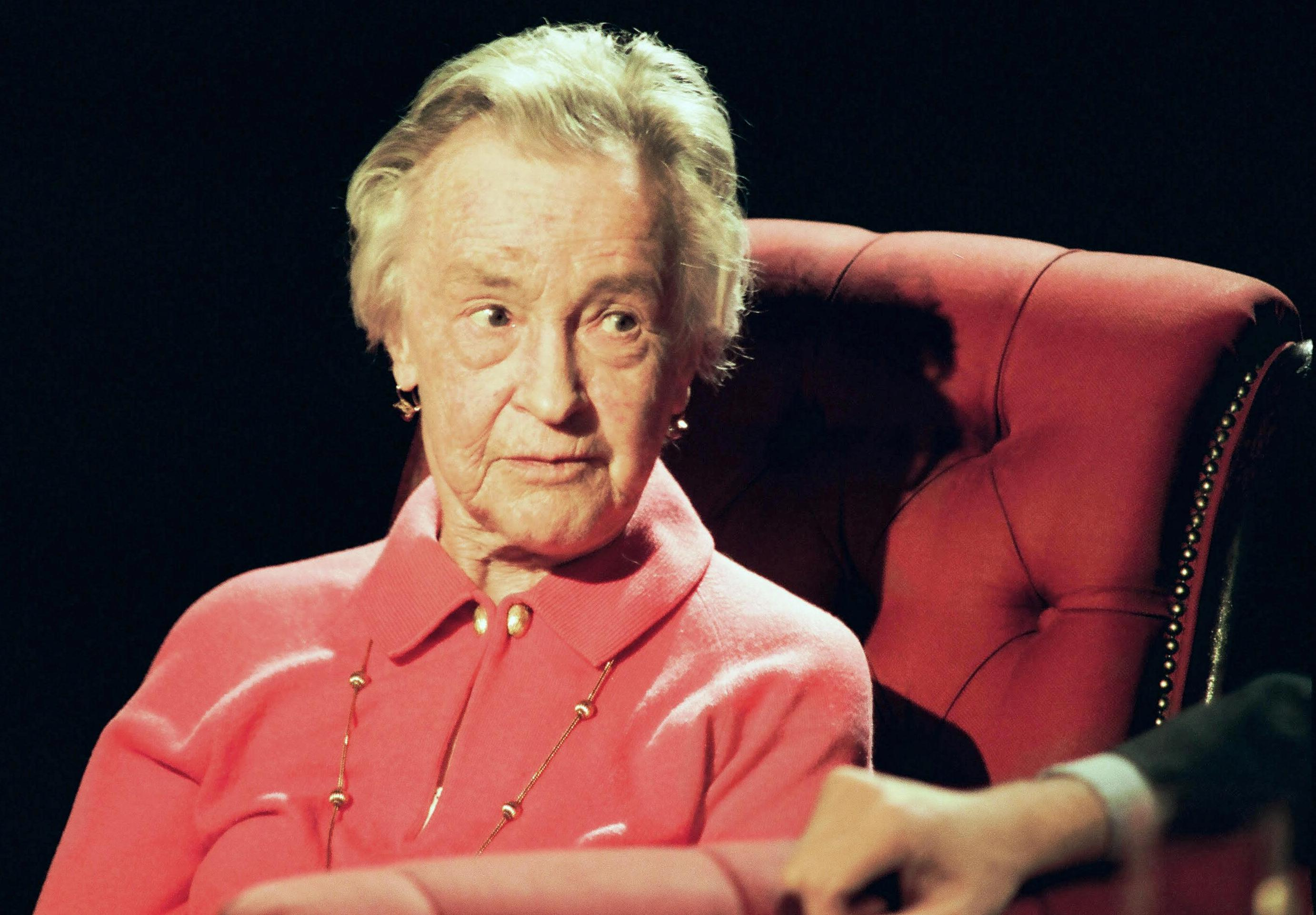
Appearing on TV discussion programme After Dark in 1997

She married Brian Warren, a lieutenant in the Army, in 1942.

== Other ==
She was a Friend of the English Pocket Opera Company and a Guardian of Westminster Abbey.
