= Brian Warren =

British medical officer (1914–1996)

Sir Harold Brian Seymour Warren (19 December 1914–18 August 1996), was a medical officer to the Grenadier Guards in 1943, a physician at the Wellington Barracks, and then a resident medical officer at the King Edward VII's Hospital, London, where he worked with Matron Alice Saxby and came to know and later became personal physician to British Prime Minister Sir Edward Heath. His first wife was Dame Josephine Barnes. He was knighted in the February 1974 Dissolution Honours.

Born in Toddington, Bedfordshire in 1914, the elder son of an East Anglian gentleman farmer, Warren inherited from his mother a lifelong love of the countryside in all its aspects.

== Bibliography ==
- Hough, Richard (1998). Sister Agnes: The History of King Edward VII's Hospital for Officers 1899-1999. London: John Murray. ISBN 0-7195-5561-2
