= English Pocket Opera Company =

English Pocket Opera Company is an opera company based in the south of England. EPOC was founded in 1993 by Mark Tinkler and Annabel Lee. It works with thousands of children and young people every year in schools and other settings. EPOC has collaborated with many organisations including English National Opera, the Royal Opera House, and local music services. From 2006 until 2016, EPOC worked with design students from Central Saint Martins to create critically acclaimed and highly original opera productions.

EPOC was the first (in 1999) to present back-to-back the Beaumarchais Figaro trilogy of Rossini's The Barber of Seville, Mozart's The Marriage of Figaro and Milhaud's La mère coupable. It gave the British premiere of Massenet's Cléopâtre and of Haydn's The Desert Island (L'isola disabitata) in a new translation by John Warrack, conducted by Sian Edwards. The company has performed at a number of prestigious festivals and venues, including the Edinburgh Festival Fringe, the Bermuda Festival, the London 2012 Festival, the Longborough Festival Opera, the Covent Garden Festival (Linbury Studio Theatre), the Royal Festival Hall and Royal Albert Hall (together with 5,000 children).

The company's repertoire is wide, and it prepares its own pocket or chamber versions of the operas it performs. Its Ring cycle was condensed into 90 minutes, and was a promenade performance, with the audience moving to each different scene. Other operas have included Tristan und Isolde, The Love for Three Oranges, The Magic Flute, Bluebeard's Castle, Carmen, Don Giovanni, Hamlet and Pagliacci.

Since 2015, EPOC has had an annual tour in Bosnia and Herzegovina, giving performances and leading workshops with local communities.
