= Raymond Lamont-Brown =

Scottish non-fiction writer

Raymond Lamont-Brown (born 1939) is a Scottish non-fiction writer of biographies and popular history books. He is the former editor of Writers' Monthly.

== Selected publications ==
=== Articles ===
- "YAKUSA the International Expansion of Japan's Criminal Brotherhood", The Police Journal: Theory, Practice and Principles, Vol. 55, No. 4 (1 October 1982), pp. 355–359.

=== Books ===
- A book of epitaphs (1967)
- Clarinda: The intimate story of Robert Burns and Agnes MacLehose (1968)
- A book of proverbs (1970)
- A book of superstitions (1970)
- Phantoms of the sea: Legends, customs, and superstitions (1972)
- Phantoms of the theater (1976)
- Growing up with the Highland clans (1978)
- Kamikaze: Japan's suicide samurai (1997)
- Edward VII's last loves: Alice Keppel & Agnes Keyser (1998)
- Kempeitai: Japan's dreaded military police (1998)
- Tutor to the Dragon Emperor: The life of Sir Reginald Fleming Johnston at the court of the last emperor (1999)
- John Brown: Queen Victoria's Highland servant (2000)
- Royal poxes and potions: The lives of court physicians, surgeons and apothecaries (2001)
- Ships from hell: Japanese war crimes on the high seas (2002)
- Carnegie: The richest man in the world (2005)
- How fat was Henry VIII?: And 101 other questions and answers on royal history (2008)
- Witch Cure and Curse Stones (????) need verification
