= Michael Fraser, Baron Fraser of Kilmorack =

Richard Michael Fraser, Baron Fraser of Kilmorack, CBE (28 October 1915 – 1 July 1996) was a British Conservative Party political administrator. The Conservative historian Lord Blake wrote that Fraser "will go down to history as a figure comparable only to Gorst under Disraeli or the famous Captain Middleton under Salisbury".

== Life ==
Fraser was born in Aberdeen, the son of Dr Thomas Fraser CBE DSO TD DL, and of Maria-Theresia Kayser, from Hanover. He was educated at Aberdeen Grammar School, Fettes College, and King's College, Cambridge, where he took a degree in History. During World War II, he served with the Royal Artillery, attaining the rank of lieutenant colonel. He was appointed a Member of the Order of the British Empire (Military Division) in 1945.

After the war, Fraser joined the Conservative Research Department (CRD), serving as its Director between 1959 and 1964 and its Chairman between 1970 and 1974. He was Deputy Chairman of the Conservative Party between 1964 and 1975; he was described as a "linchpin" between the variously wings of the Conservative Party while he was its Deputy Chairman.

At the CRD, he turned down job applications from Guy Burgess and Donald Maclean, on the grounds that they were "Communist agents"; both men were later unmasked as Soviet agents. In 1970, Fraser was considered for the position of Cabinet Secretary; he refused, saying "I serve the party, not some bloody state".

Fraser was appointed a Commander of the Order of British Empire in 1955 for political services and was knighted in 1962. He was made a life peer in the February 1974 Dissolution Honours List as Baron Fraser of Kilmorack, of Rubislaw in the County of the City of Aberdeen.

Fraser married Chloe Drummond in 1944; they had two sons. He died in London in 1996. His papers are held at the Hoover Institution Library and Archives at Stanford University.

== Arms ==
Coat of arms of Michael Fraser, Baron Fraser of Kilmorack

Crest
A buck's head couped Argent collared Azure and attired Or.
Escutcheon
Quarterly: 1st & 4th Azure three cinquefoils Argent all within a bordure counter company of the first and second; 2nd & 3rd Argent three antique crowns Gules.
Supporters
Two pine martens Proper.
Motto
Aiiempio
