= Conservative Research Department =

Part of the UK Conservative Party

The Conservative Research Department (CRD) is part of the central organisation of the Conservative Party in the United Kingdom. It operates alongside other departments of Conservative Campaign Headquarters in Westminster.

The CRD has been described as a training ground for leading Conservative politicians. Former CRD advisers to have served in the Cabinet include former prime minister David Cameron, former deputy prime minister Oliver Dowden, former chancellor of the exchequer George Osborne, former defence secretary Michael Portillo, former chancellor of the Duchy of Lancaster Oliver Letwin and former health secretary Andrew Lansley. After 1945, Enoch Powell, Iain Macleod, Reginald Maudling and Chris Patten passed through it.

== History ==
=== Neville Chamberlain ===
The CRD was established by Neville Chamberlain in 1929, to undertake detailed policy work for the leader of the Party (then Stanley Baldwin) and his principal colleagues. It was the first real think-tank on the right in British politics. For 50 years it occupied its own premises in Old Queen Street overlooking St James's Park, but after the 1979 election, Margaret Thatcher united it physically with the rest of the Party's Central Office.

=== Rab Butler ===
The CRD's work was suspended during the Second World War, but it was re-established on a wider basis with a larger staff by Rab Butler, who would be its chairman from 1945 until 1965 Its post-war role included the provision of briefing material on major legislation before Parliament and on the main issues of political controversy, as well as working with Butler to define post-war Conservatism.

The CRD determined Conservative policy during the post-war consensus until it broke down in the 1970s. The series of Campaign Guides that the CRD began to produce in 1950 recorded in detail the progress of Conservative governments in this period. More recent volumes in the series have continued to provide a full, official account of Conservative policy and its implementation.

=== Margaret Thatcher ===
When Margaret Thatcher became Conservative Party leader in 1975, the CRD organised a full policy review to be co-ordinated by Sir Keith Joseph which preceded her election as prime minister. Unimpressed by what the department then had to offer, she and Sir Keith Joseph set up their own think-tank, the Centre for Policy Studies in 1975 on her becoming Leader of the Opposition. The CPS was financed by Nigel (later Lord) Vinson, and its first director was the late Alfred (later Sir Alfred) Sherman, who became Mrs Thatcher's speechwriter when she entered Downing Street. Sir Keith's key political assistant at the CPS was Philip van der Elst, a former Treasurer of the Oxford Union in which post he had directly succeeded Ann Widdecombe. Later when in office, Mrs Thatcher valued the CRD primarily for the way in which it communicated to the Conservative Party at large that radical political change was needed and how Britain was being transformed as a result of these changes. The CRD was a link between a reforming administration and the party on whose support it depended. It produced her general election manifestos and worked closely with her during election campaigns. The director appointed in 1979 was Adam Ridley, who since 1974 had been Economic Adviser to the Shadow Cabinet.

In 1989, the CRD co-funded a trip of David Cameron and other Conservative researchers to South Africa while under apartheid rule, alongside the Strategy Network International, which was created in 1985 to lobby against anti-apartheid sanctions.

The group continued to work closely with the party leader and other senior figures. During the 2005 election campaign, the CRD was again the leader's policy secretariat, assisting Michael Howard's close advisers with the formulation of the Conservative position on key subjects and the development of the strategy for the campaign. Under the editorship of Alistair Cooke, the CRD also wrote and published the latest volume of the Campaign Guide, providing detailed policy and political attack material.

=== David Cameron ===
Under David Cameron the CRD was reorganised; in June 2006, Desk Officers were retitled as Special Advisers to the Shadow Cabinet and relocated to the House of Commons, while the enlarged political section and policy secretariat remained at Campaign HQ. This was reversed the following year when, in September 2007, the possibility of an early general election prompted the Party leadership to move Special Advisers back in-house to the new Campaign Headquarters at 30 Millbank.

== List of Directors of the Conservative Research Department ==
1930-1939: Sir Joseph Ball

1939-1945: Post vacant

1945-1951: David Clarke

1948-1950: Henry Hopkinson

1948-1959: Percy Cohen

1951-1964: Michael Fraser

1964-1970: Brendan Sewill

1970-1974: James Douglas

1974-1979: Chris Patten

1979-1982: Alan Howarth

1982-1984: Peter Cropper

1985-1989: Robin Harris

1990-1995: Andrew Lansley

1995-1998: Daniel Finkelstein

1999-2003: Rick Nye

2003-2005: Greg Clark

2005-2006: John Glen

2006-2007: George Bridges

2007-2010: James O'Shaughnessy

2010-2013: Nick Park

2013-2015: Alex Dawson

2015-2017: Andrew Goodfellow

2017-2019: Adam Memon

2019-2021: Iain Carter

2021-2023: Ross Kempsell

2023- : Marcus Natale
