= Alec Williams Badenoch =

Scottish urologist

Alec Williams Badenoch (23 June 1903 – 16 February 1991) was a Scottish urologist. He was Hunterian Professor in 1948, member of the General Medical Council between 1966 and 1972 and of the General Dental Council between 1970 and 1972, president of the Hunterian Society in 1949 and Hunterian Orator in 1957. In 1963 he operated on Prime Minister, Harold Macmillan, at the King Edward VII's Hospital. In 1974, he was awarded the St Peter's Medal of the British Association of Urological Surgeons.
