= Mansoura University Vertebrate Paleontology Center =

Egyptian vertebrate paleontology research center

- مركز جامعة المنصورة للحفريات الفقارية
- Abbreviation: MUVP
- Formation: 2010
- Founder: Hesham Sallam
- Type: Research center
- Purpose: Vertebrate paleontology research, fossil preparation, curation, digitization, and training
- Headquarters: Mansoura University
- Location: Mansoura, Egypt
- Founder: Hesham Sallam
- Parent organization: Mansoura University
- Website: muvp.mans.edu.eg/index.php/en/

The Mansoura University Vertebrate Paleontology Center (MUVP; Arabic: مركز جامعة المنصورة للحفريات الفقارية) is an Egyptian research center based in Mansoura University, Mansoura, Egypt.

== History ==
MUVP was founded by vertebrate paleontologist Hesham Sallam. MUVP was established to educate Egyptian vertebrate paleontologists, expand awareness of Egypt's vertebrate paleontological resources, and undertake the collection, preparation, study, and curation of fossil vertebrates from Egypt.

== Facilities ==
MUVP maintains a Fossil Preparation & Conservation Lab and a Digital Imaging & 3D Morphometrics Lab. Its digitization program includes 3D scanning and digital modeling of fossils for research, teaching, and collaboration.

== Research ==
MUVP is involved in vertebrate paleontology projects concerning the evolution of vertebrates in the Late Cretaceous, Paleogene, and Miocene of Africa. Its research-project pages include work on the Paleocene–Eocene thermal maximum, fossil vertebrates from the Faiyum Oasis, and fossil whales from Wadi al Hitan.

== Initiatives ==
MUVP runs several public and academic initiatives, including Young Egyptian Paleontologist (YEP), a training and mentorship initiative aimed at building a new generation of Egyptian scientists in vertebrate paleontology.

Other listed initiatives include Women in Vertebrate Paleontology, Egyptians study Egyptian vertebrate fossils, Digitization, and Explore with Us.

== Selected discoveries and contributions ==
Researchers affiliated with MUVP have contributed to a number of fossil vertebrate studies from Egypt, including:

Year	Taxon	Authors
2026	Masripithecus moghraensis gen. et sp. nov.	Al-Ashqar, Seiffert, El-Sayed, Salem, Gohar, El-Saka, Amin, & Sallam
2025	Wadisuchus kassabi gen. et sp. nov.	Saber, Salem, Ouda, Gohar, El-Sayed, O'Connor, & Sallam
2025	Bastetodon syrtos gen. nov.	Al-Ashqar, Borths, El-Desouky, Heritage, Abed, Seiffert, El-Sayed, & Sallam
2025	Sekhmetops gen. nov. (including S. africanus and S. phiomensis)	Al-Ashqar, Borths, El-Desouky, Heritage, Abed, Seiffert, El-Sayed, & Sallam
2024	Eliwourus topernawiensis gen. et sp. nov.	Seiffert, Heritage, De Vries, Sallam, Vitek, Aoron, & Princehouse
2023	Tutcetus rayanensis gen. et sp. nov.	Antar, Gohar, El-Desouky, Seiffert, El-Sayed, Claxton, & Sallam
2022	Igai semkhu gen. et sp. nov.	Gorscak, Lamanna, Schwarz, Díaz, Salem, Sallam, & Wiechmann
2021	Qatranimys safroutus gen. et sp. nov.	Al-Ashqar, Seiffert, De Vries, El-Sayed, Antar, & Sallam
2021	Phiomicetus anubis gen. et sp. nov.	Gohar, Antar, Boessenecker, Sabry, El-Sayed, Seiffert, Zalmout, & Sallam
2018	Mansourasaurus shahinae gen. et sp. nov.	Sallam, Gorscak, O'Connor, El-Dawoudi, El-Sayed, Saber, Kora, Sertich, Seiffert, & Lamanna
2018	Masradapis tahai gen. et sp. nov.	Seiffert, Boyer, Fleagle, Gunnell, Heesy, Perry, & Sallam
2017	Qarmoutus hitanensis gen. et sp. nov.	El-Sayed, Kora, Sallam, Claeson, Seiffert, & Antar
2017	Enchodus tineidae sp. nov.	Holloway, Claeson, Sallam, El-Sayed, Kora, Sertich, & O'Connor
2012	Acritophiomys bowni gen. et sp. nov.	Sallam, Seiffert, & Simons
2010	Kabirmys qarunensis gen. et sp. nov.	Sallam, Seiffert, Simons, & Brindley
2010	Nosmips aenigmaticus gen. et sp. nov.	Seiffert, Simons, Boyer, Perry, Ryan, & Sallam

== See also ==
- Mansoura University
- Wadi El Hitan
- Fayum Depression
- Society of Vertebrate Paleontology
