= St Paul's Medal =

The St Paul's Medal, established by British urologist Richard Turner-Warwick in 1989, is awarded annually by the British Association of Urological Surgeons (BAUS) for contributions to the surgical field of urology by a person from outside of the United Kingdom. Awardees include Mohamed Ghoneim, Mark Soloway, Anthony J. Costello, Culley C. Carson III, Indy Gill, and Mani Menon.

== List of awardees ==
St Paul's Medal Recipients
Year	Recipient	Comments
1989	Willard Goodwin and Harry P. Spence	
1990	Rudolf Hohenfellner	
1991	Frank Hinman Jr	
1992	Mohamed Ghoneim	
1993	Dara K. Karanjavala	
1994	Adib H. Rizvi and Ernst K. Zingg	
1995	Edward P. Arnold	
1996	Robert D. Jeffs and James F. Glenn	
2001	E. Darracott Vaughan	
2002	Howard Snyder III	
2006	Indy Gill and John Quartey	
2007	Urs E Studer.	
2008	Jack McAninch	
2009	Ralph Clayman	
2011	Jens-Uwe Stolzenberg	
2012	Mahesh Desai	
2014	Culley C. Carson III	
2015	Mark Soloway	
2017	Anthony J. Costello	
2018	Alan W. Partin	
2021	Mani Menon	

== See also ==
- St Peter's Medal
