= Mark Soloway =

American oncologist (born 1943)

- Born: 1943 (age 82–83); Midwest
- Education: Case Western Reserve University School of Medicine; University Hospitals of Cleveland
- Occupation: Surgeon
- Known for: Prostate, bladder and kidney cancer research
- Medical career
- Profession: Urologist
- Institutions: University of Tennessee; Miller School of Medicine, University of Miami; Memorial Hospital, Florida
- Sub-specialties: Prostate, bladder and kidney cancer
- Awards: Gold Cystoscope Award (1984); St Paul's Medal (2015)

Dr. Mark S. Soloway (born 1943) is an American urologist and professor emeritus of urology. His work has focused on prostate, bladder, and kidney cancer research. He served as a professor and chairman of the Department of Urology at the University of Miami Miller School of Medicine, and as chief of urologic oncology at Memorial Hospital in Hollywood, Florida.

Soloway graduated from Case Western Reserve University School of Medicine, in Cleveland, Ohio, and completed his residency in urology at University Hospitals of Cleveland. He completed a two-year surgery branch fellowship at the National Cancer Institute (NCI) of the National Institute of Health (NIH) in Bethesda, Maryland. There, he developed an animal model to investigate the efficacy of several investigative chemotherapeutic drugs for bladder cancer. He later returned to Case Western Reserve to complete his residency in urology.

== Early life and education ==
Mark Soloway was born in the Midwest in 1943. In 1964, he received a bachelor's degree in biology from Northwestern University in Chicago. He graduated from the Case Western Reserve University School of Medicine in Cleveland in 1968. While there, neurosurgeon Robert J. White reportedly influenced his interest in translational research.

== Early career ==
In 1968, Soloway conducted a two-year clinical fellowship at the National Cancer Institute (NCI) of the National Institutes of Health (NIH) in Bethesda, Maryland, specializing in urology. He developed an animal model for bladder cancer to research treatments for locally advanced or spreading bladder cancer. This model, induced by the chemical FANFT in mice, allowed him to investigate the effectiveness of several experimental chemotherapy drugs for bladder cancer. (Note: After more than thirty years, this transplantable tumor model, later established as the MBT-2 tumor and its more malignant derivative MBT-9, are still being used by researchers all over the world to test experimental and targeted therapeutic agents. Soloway's research was supported by NIH funding throughout his residency in Urology at Case Western Reserve University and as faculty at the University of Tennessee Center for the Health Sciences.) He also investigated the hypothesis that the high rate of local recurrence of bladder lining tumors may result from implantation of tumor cells on the urothelial surface following endoscopic resection of bladder tumors. (Note: The bladder urothelium is generally dormant but regenerates following injury.) By developing an animal test for bladder tumor placement, Soloway's research contributed to the understanding that urothelial injury creates an environment for tumor implantation and supported the use of early intravesical chemotherapy following transurethral resection of a bladder tumor. (Note: Twenty years later, a series of prospective randomized clinical trials have firmly established the benefit of post-TURBT intravesical chemotherapy.) This included his research on cis-diamminedichloro platinum, a type of cancer drug known as cisplatin. After completing his fellowship, Soloway returned to Case Western Reserve to complete his residency in urology. He then joined the University of Tennessee. His research also included early studies on combining chemotherapy and radiation.

== Later career ==
From 1991 to 2010, Soloway served as a professor and the chairman of the University of Miami Miller School of Medicine Department of Urology. In 2014, he became chief of urologic oncology at Memorial Hospital in Hollywood, Florida. Soloway was among the early urologic oncologists to incorporate flexible cystoscopy into his practice.

=== Transrectal ultrasonography for prostate cancer ===
Soloway's prostate cancer research includes work related to diagnosis, treatment, and management:

- Diagnosis: He contributed to the introduction of transrectal ultrasonography for prostate cancer detection.
- Pain Management: He developed the periprostatic nerve block technique to reduce pain during prostate biopsies.
- Androgen Deprivation Therapy: Soloway studied the use of hormone therapy prior to surgery (radical prostatectomy) in patients with prostate cancer that had begun to spread.
- Quality of Life: He researched the importance of considering patient quality of life in treatment decisions.
- Active Surveillance: He supported the monitoring of low-risk prostate cancer as an alternative to immediate treatment, a method known as active surveillance.
- Surgical Techniques: His work included research on prostate cancer surgery techniques aimed at reducing complications and improving recovery.

Soloway promoted the TRUS biopsy method for use in urologists' outpatient clinics. He also contributed to the popularization of the periprostatic nerve block to minimize biopsy discomfort.

=== Evaluating androgen deprivation ===
During the 1980s and early 1990s, a high percentage of men with prostate cancer were diagnosed with locally advanced disease. LHRH analogues were increasingly used as initial treatment. To assess the efficacy of neoadjuvant androgen deprivation therapy before prostatectomy in improving progression-free and overall survival, Soloway initiated a prospective randomized trial involving a multi-institutional group. This trial indicated that while the surgical margin rate was lower for men who received androgen deprivation before prostatectomy, there was no improvement in progression-free or overall survival. (Note: Other groups who later performed similar studies have substantiated these results.)

=== Positive surgical margins ===
Soloway's clinical research has also focused on the relationship between positive surgical margins and the preservation of the bladder neck and approach to the seminal vesicles. His 1996 publication on this topic detailed pathological analysis of the location and consequences of positive surgical margins. In a paper published in The Journal of Urology, he reported that the recurrence rate was 20% in his patient cohort with a positive surgical margin, suggesting that routine adjuvant radiation therapy might overtreat a majority of these patients. Regarding urinary continence, Soloway has advocated for bladder neck preservation during radical retropubic prostatectomy to enhance urinary continence without compromising cancer control. Soloway and M. Manoharan collaborated on techniques to minimize the side effects of radical prostatectomy, including the use of a lower abdominal transverse incision to potentially reduce pain and enhance recovery. Their work also indicated that many patients may not require a drain and that an inguinal hernia could be repaired during the same operation as a radical prostatectomy using this transverse incision.

=== Watchful waiting approach (active surveillance) ===
With the advent of PSA testing and early detection of prostate cancer, Soloway advocated for active surveillance for patients with low-risk, low-volume Gleason 6 prostate cancer who adhered to careful monitoring, citing concerns about overtreatment. In 2000, he published a series of patients, including those eligible for watchful waiting and active surveillance, reporting that a low percentage of these patients subsequently underwent treatment. Using a stricter definition for active surveillance, Soloway's group reported that less than 15% of these prostate cancer patients proceeded to treatment. This series was later updated in European Urology to include quality of life parameters, maintaining a consistent rate of 15% progressing to treatment.

=== Work on renal tumors ===
Soloway collaborated with Gaetano Ciancio, a former resident and co-faculty member, on kidney cancer research. They developed a surgical approach for large renal tumors, particularly those with tumor extension into the vena cava. Ciancio, a urologist fellowship-trained in renal and liver transplantation, worked with Soloway to reduce perioperative morbidity and mortality associated with these tumor masses. Their approach aimed to integrate surgical techniques from liver transplantation to increase vena cava exposure, intending to reduce blood loss and avoid circulatory arrest. They have published articles on this technique since 2000. Their recent publications provide updates on their step-by-step approach to minimizing complications related to renal cell carcinoma with vena cava thrombus, highlighting improvements in safety and reduction in operative mortality and morbidity. This technique is intended for duplication in tertiary medical centers with liver transplant surgeons.

=== Cancer support group ===
Soloway established one of the early prostate cancer support groups in Memphis, Tennessee. In 1992, he co-authored one of the initial quality of life (QOL) studies examining patient preference regarding LHRH versus orchiectomy for advanced disease. In 1995, Soloway and colleagues published a study on QOL implications of surgical management versus radiation therapy for localized prostate cancer. Soloway has also researched the psychosocial and sexual implications of this disease on patients and their partners.

== Awards and honors ==
Soloway's awards include:

- 1967 - Mosby Scholarship for Scholastic Excellence award
- 1972 - North Central Section of American Urological Association Traveling Fellowship award
- 1984 - American Urological Association's Gold Cystoscope Award
- 2008 - Presidential Citation.
- 2015 - British Association of Urological Surgeons awarded him the St Paul's Medal.

== Selected publications ==
- Soloway, M. S. (April 1980). "Rationale for intensive intravesical chemotherapy for superficial bladder cancer". The Journal of Urology. 123 (4): 461–466. doi:10.1016/s0022-5347(17)55976-5. ISSN 0022-5347. PMID 6767860.
- Soloway MS: Intravesical chemotherapy in superficial bladder cancer. In: Genitourinary Cancer - Contemporary Issues in Clinical Oncology. (ed): Garnick, Mark B. Churchill Livingston, New York, pp. 163–192, 1985.
- Soloway MS: "The use of an animal model to gain insights into bladder cancer therapy". In: Testicular Cancer and Other Tumors of the Genitourinary Tract. (ed): Pavone-Macaluso, M., Smith, P.H. and Bagshaw, M.A. Plenum Publishing Corp., New York, London, Washington, D.C., pp. 315–327, 1985.
- Aso, Y., Anderson, L., Soloway, M., Bouffioux, C., Chisholm, G., Debruyne, F., Kawai, T., Kurth, K.H., Maru, A., and Straffon, W.G.E.: Prognostic factors in superficial bladder cancer. In: Developments in Bladder Cancer. (ed): Denis, L., Niijima, T., Prout, G. Jr., and Schroeder, F.H. Progress in Clinical and Biological Research, Volume 221. Alan R. Liss, Inc., New York, pp. 257–269, 1986.
- Soloway MS: The case for chemotherapy as the initial management of patients with carcinoma in situ of the urinary bladder. In: Controversies in Urology. (ed): Carlton, C.E. Jr. Yearbook Medical Publishers, Chicago, pp. 237–241, 1989.
- Soloway MS: Studien der National Prostatic Cancer Project and Treatment Group des fortgeschrittenen prostatakarzinoms. In: Aktuelle Therapie des prostatakarzinoms. (ed): R. Ackermann, J. Altwein. Springer-Verlag, Berlin, pp. 361–369, 1991.
- Soloway, M. S.; Kurth, K. H.; Herr, H.; Huland, H.; Denis, L.; Suzuki, K.; Blandy, J.; Hisazumi, H.; Koontz, W.; Tsugawa, R. (1986). "Surgical techniques in the management of patients with superficial bladder cancer". Progress in Clinical and Biological Research. 221: 123–132. ISSN 0361-7742. PMID 3809179.
- Soloway, M. S. (1989). "Should all superficial bladder tumors be treated with intravesical therapy?". Progress in Clinical and Biological Research. 303: 491–501. ISSN 0361-7742. PMID 2675006.
- Soloway MS: Studien der National Prostatic Cancer Project and Treatment Group des fortgeschrittenen prostatakarzinoms. In: Aktuelle Therapie des prostatakarzinoms. (ed): R. Ackermann, J. Altwein. Springer-Verlag, Berlin, pp. 361–369, 1991.
