= MPUH =

MPUH may refer to two hospitals:

- Merlin Park University Hospital, Galway, Ireland
- Muljibhai Patel Urological Hospital, Nadiad, Gujarat, India
