= Hesham Sallam =

Egyptian Vertebrate Paleontologist

- هشام سلام
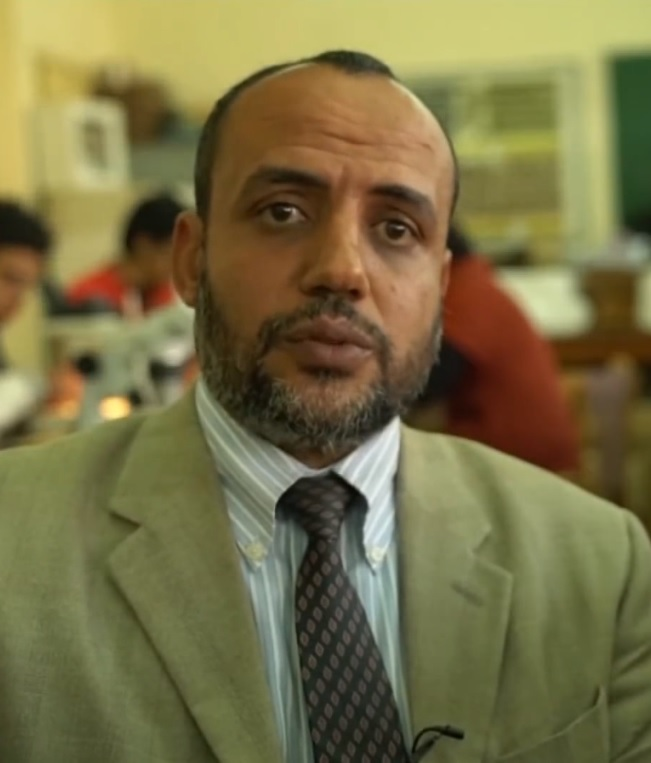
- Education: Mansoura University, Oxford University
- Known for: Mansourasaurus
- Scientific career
- Fields: Vertebrate Paleontology
- Institutions: Mansoura University
- Theses: Late Eocene rodents from Fayum Depression, Egypt: taxonomic, phylogenetic, and biogeographic implications (2010); The Senonian macrofauna of west-central Sinai: Systematic and stratigraphic distribution (2002)
- Doctoral advisor: Erik Seiffert; Stephen Hesselbo

Hesham Sallam (Arabic: هشام سلام; born 1975) is an Egyptian paleontologist and the founder of the Mansoura University Vertebrate Paleontology Center (MUVP), the first vertebrate paleontology program in the Middle East. He works as a full professor at Mansoura University. Sallam led the discovery and description of Mansourasaurus shahinae, a species of sauropod dinosaur from Egypt, which has improved understanding of the prehistory of Africa during the latest Cretaceous period. His work has helped popularize paleontology in Egypt.

== Biography ==
Hesham Sallam was born in 1975 in Sharkia, Egypt. He received a bachelor's degree in geology from Mansoura University in 1997. He was a visiting scholar at Stony Brook University from 2008 to 2010, during which time he began planning what would become the MUVP. He received his Ph.D. from the University of Oxford in 2010, which made him the first Egyptian to have earned a doctorate in vertebrate paleontology in several decades. After completing his Ph.D., he returned to Egypt, where he worked at Mansoura University and founded the MUVP. Sallam is a professor at the Department of Geology, Mansoura University, Egypt. Mansoura University.

Voice of America report about the discovery of Mansourasaurus, with interview of Sallam

In December 2013, Sallam and several graduate students found the partial skeleton of a dinosaur at the Dakhla Oasis in the Western Desert of Egypt. In February 2014 they returned to the site to excavate the specimen, which took 21 days. Sallam led a team of Egyptian and American paleontologists in describing the specimen, which was announced as belonging to a new species of sauropod, Mansourasaurus shahinae, in January 2018. The holotype specimen of Mansourasaurus is the most complete fossil of a terrestrial animal from the post-Cenomanian Cretaceous in mainland Africa, a period of nearly 30 million years which otherwise has a poorly-known fossil record in Africa. Mansourasaurus is closely related to European species, providing evidence that Africa was not entirely geographically isolated during the Late Cretaceous. The discovery attracted considerable media attention and has helped popularize paleontology in Egypt.

Sallam has been described as one of the most significant paleontologists in the Middle East. The MUVP is the first Middle Eastern research program dedicated to vertebrate paleontology. While fossils have been found in Egypt for over a century, prior to Sallam's founding of the MUVP, vertebrate paleontology research in Egypt was primarily conducted by foreigners. Sallam hopes to change that, using the MUVP both for public outreach and training the next generation of Egyptian vertebrate paleontologists. One of Sallam's students, Sanaa El-Sayed, is the first woman from the Middle East to have been the lead author on an internationally-published vertebrate paleontology research paper.

Below is a list of taxa that Sallam has contributed to naming:

Year	Taxon	Authors
2026	Masripithecus moghraensis gen. et sp. nov.	Al-Ashqar, Seiffert, El-Sayed, Salem, Gohar, El-Saka, Amin, & Sallam
2025	Wadisuchus kassabi gen. et sp. nov.	Saber, Salem, Ouda, Gohar, El-Sayed, O'Connor, & Sallam
2024	Eliwourus topernawiensis gen. et sp. nov.	Seiffert, Heritage, De Vries, Sallam, Vitek, Aoron, & Princehouse
2023	Tutcetus rayanensis gen. et sp. nov.	Antar, Gohar, El-Desouky, Seiffert, El-Sayed, Claxton, & Sallam
2022	Igai semkhu gen. et sp. nov.	Gorscak, Lamanna, Schwarz, Díaz, Salem, Sallam, & Wiechmann
2021	Qatranimys safroutus gen. et sp. nov.	Al-Ashqar, Seiffert, De Vries, El-Sayed, Antar, & Sallam
2021	Phiomicetus anubis gen. et sp. nov.	Gohar, Antar, Boessenecker, Sabry, El-Sayed, Seiffert, Zalmout, & Sallam
2018	Mansourasaurus shahinae gen. et sp. nov.	Sallam, Gorscak, O'Connor, El-Dawoudi, El-Sayed, Saber, Kora, Sertich, Seiffert, & Lamanna
2018	Masradapis tahai gen. et sp. nov.	Seiffert, Boyer, Fleagle, Gunnell, Heesy, Perry, & Sallam
2017	Qarmoutus hitanensis gen. et sp. nov.	El-Sayed, Kora, Sallam, Claeson, Seiffert, & Antar
2017	Enchodus tineidae sp. nov.	Holloway, Claeson, Sallam, El-Sayed, Kora, Sertich, & O'Connor
2012	Acritophiomys bowni gen. et sp. nov.	Sallam, Seiffert, & Simons
2010	Kabirmys qarunensis gen. et sp. nov.	Sallam, Seiffert, Simons, & Brindley
2010	Nosmips aenigmaticus gen. et sp. nov.	Seiffert, Simons, Boyer, Perry, Ryan, & Sallam

== Selected publications ==
- Sallam, Hesham M.; Gorscak, Eric; O'Connor, Patrick M.; El-Dawoudi, Iman A.; El-Sayed, Sanaa; Saber, Sara; Kora, Mahmoud A.; Sertich, Joseph J. W.; Sieffert, Erik R.; Lamanna, Matthew C. (2018-01-29). "New Egyptian sauropod reveals Late Cretaceous dinosaur dispersal between Europe and Africa". Nature Ecology & Evolution. 2 (3): 445–451. Bibcode:2018NatEE...2..445S. doi:10.1038/s41559-017-0455-5. PMID 29379183. S2CID 3375335.
- New adapiform primate fossils from the late Eocene of Egypt.(vol 29, pg 1, 2017), ER Seiffert, DM Boyer, JG Fleagle, GF Gunnell… - HISTORICAL BIOLOGY, 2017
- A new species of the neopterygian fish Enchodus from the Duwi Formation, Campanian, Late Cretaceous, Western Desert, central Egypt, WL Holloway, KM Claeson, HM Sallam, S El-Sayed… - Acta Palaeontologica Polonica, 2017
- A new genus and species of marine catfishes (Siluriformes; Ariidae) from the upper Eocene Birket Qarun Formation, Wadi El-Hitan, Egypt, SE El-Sayed, MA Kora, HM Sallam, KM Claeson… - PLoS One, 2017.
- Erik R. Seiffert, Doug M. Boyer, John G. Fleagle, Gregg F. Gunnell, Christopher P. Heesy, Jonathan M. G. Perry & Hesham M. Sallam (2018) New adapiform primate fossils from the late Eocene of Egypt, Historical Biology, 30:1-2, 204-226, doi:10.1080/08912963.2017.1306522.2017
- Robert J. Asher, Gregg F. Gunnell, Erik R. Seiffert, David Pattinson, Rodolphe Tabuce, Lionel Hautier & Hesham M. Sallam (2017) Dental eruption and growth in Hyracoidea (Mammalia, Afrotheria), Journal of Vertebrate Paleontology, 37:3, doi:10.1080/02724634.2017.1317638 2017
- Patterns of dental emergence in early anthropoid primates from the Fayum Depression, Egypt, GF Gunnell, ER Miller, ER Seiffert, HM Sallam… - AMERICAN JOURNAL OF PHYSICAL …, Pages 157-165 | Received 19 Jan 2017, Accepted 08 Feb 2017, Published online: 21 Feb 2017
- A new anthracothere (Artiodactyla) from the early Oligocene, Fayum, Egypt, and the mystery of African 'Rhagatherium'solved, AH Sileem, HM Sallam, AGA Hewaidy, ER Miller… - Journal of Paleontology, 2016
- Ancient phylogenetic divergence of the enigmatic African rodent Zenkerella and the origin of anomalurid gliding, S Heritage, D Fernández, HM Sallam, DT Cronin… - PeerJ, 2016
- Vertebrate paleontological exploration of the Upper Cretaceous succession in the Dakhla and Kharga Oases, Western Desert, Egypt, HM Sallam, PM O'Connor, M Kora, JJW Sertich… - Journal of African Earth Sciences, 2016
- Open access to Fayum primate fossils through the digital data archive MorphoSource, ER Seiffert, GF Gunnell, SW Heritage, HM Sallam… - Am. J. Phys. Anthropol, 2016
- Sallam HM, Seiffert ER. 2016. New phiomorph rodents from the latest Eocene of Egypt, and the impact of Bayesian "clock"-based phylogenetic methods on estimates of basal hystricognath relationships and biochronology. PeerJ 4:e1717 https://doi.org/10.7717/peerj.1717
- The first evidence of paleo-wildfire from the Campanian (Late Cretaceous) of North Africa, H El Atfy, H Sallam, A Jasper, D Uhl - Cretaceous Research, 2016
- Deciduous dentition and dental eruption sequence of Bothriogenys fraasi (Anthracotheriidae, Artiodactyla) from the Fayum Depression, Egypt, HM Sallam, AH Sileem, ER Miller, GF Gunnell - Palaeontologia electronica, 2016
- Anthracotheres (Mammalia, Artiodactyla) from the upper-most horizon of the Jebel Qatrani formation, latest Early Oligocene, Fayum depression, Egypt, AH Sileem, HM Sallam, AA Hewaidy, GF Gunnell… - Egyptian Journal of Paleontology, 2015
- THE FIRST NEARLY COMPLETE NEUROCRANIUM OF A SILURIFORM (CATFISH) FROM THE UPPER EOCENE BIRKET QARUN FORMATION, WADI EL-HITAN, EGYPT SE EL-SAYED, KM CLAESON, MA KORA, MS ANTAR, HM SALLAM. (2014)
- A revision of the Upper Cretaceous lepidosirenid lungfishes from the Quseir Formation, Western Desert, central Egypt, KM Claeson, HM Sallam, PM O'Connor, JJW Sertich - Journal of Vertebrate Paleontology, 2014
- Claeson Kerin; Sallam Hesham; O'Connor Patrick; Sertich Joseph. (2013) A Revision of the Upper Cretaceous lepidosirenid lungfishes from the Quseir Formation Western Desert Central Egypt (presently being given full consideration for publication in Jo. Jouranal of Vertebrate Paleontology
- A basal phiomorph (Rodentia, Hystricognathi) from the late Eocene of the Fayum Depression, Egypt, HM Sallam, ER Seiffert, EL Simons - Swiss Journal of Palaeontology, 2012
- A saurodontid fish from the Late Cretaceous of Dakhla Oasis, Western Desert, Egypt M Youssef, H Sallam, M Friedman, P O'Connor… - Journal of Vertebrate Paleontology, 2011
- NEW GENERA OF HYSTRICOGNATHI (RODENTIA, MAMMALIA) FROM THE LATE EOCENE OF THE FAYUM DEPRESSION, NORTHERN EGYPT, H Sallam, E Seiffert, E Simons - JOURNAL OF VERTEBRATE PALEONTOLOGY, 2011
- Craniodental morphology and systematics of a new family of hystricognathous rodents (Gaudeamuridae) from the Late Eocene and Early Oligocene of Egypt, HM Sallam, ER Seiffert, EL Simons - PLoS One, 2011
- A large-bodied anomaluroid rodent from the earliest late Eocene of Egypt: Phylogenetic and biogeographic implications.Sallam HM Seiffert ER Simons EL and Brindley C (2010).
- Craniodental morphology and systematics of a new family of hystricognathous rodents (Gaudeamuridae) from the Late Eocene and Early Oligocene of Egypt, HM Sallam, ER Seiffert, EL Simons - PLoS One, 2011
- A highly derived anomalurid rodent (Mammalia) from the earliest late Eocene of Egypt, HM Sallam, ER Seiffert, EL Simons - Palaeontology, 2010
- A fossil primate of uncertain affinities from the earliest late Eocene of Egypt ER Seiffert, EL Simons, DM Boyer, JMG Perry, TM Ryan, HM Sallam Proceedings of the National Academy of Sciences 107 (21), 9712-9717.
- Sallam HM Seiffert ER and Simons EL (2010) A highly derived anomalurid rodent from the earliest late Eocene of Egypt
- Late eocene rodents from The Fayum Depression, Egypt: Taxonomic, phylogenetic, and biogeographic implications, HME Sallam - 2010
- Fossil and molecular evidence constrain scenarios for the early evolutionary and biogeographic history of hystricognathous rodents Hesham M. Sallam, Erik R. Seiffert, Michael E. Steiper, Elwyn L. Simons Proceedings of the National Academy of Sciences Sep 2009, 106 (39) 16722-16727; doi:10.1073/pnas.0908702106
- The first evidence of palaeo-wildfire from the Late Cretaceous of North Africa, H El Atfy, H Sallam, A Jasper, D Uhl.
- The first nearly complete neurocranium of a siluriform (catfish) from the Upper Eocene Birket Qarun Formation, Wadi El-Hitan, Egypt, SE EL-SAYED, KM CLAESON, MA KORA, MS ANTAR,
- Stratigraphy and microfacies of the Senonian succession in west-central Sinai, Egypt, M Kora, H Hamama, H Sallam - Egyptian Journal Geology, 2003.
- Senonian macrofauna from west-central Sinai: biostratigraphy and paleobiogeography, M Kora, H Hamama, H Sallam - Egyptian Journal of Paleontology. 2002
- Kora M Hamama H and Sallam H (2002) Senonian macrofauna from west-central Sinai: biostratigraphy and biogeography
- Kora M Hamama H and Sallam H (2002) Stratigraphy and microfacies of the Senonian in west-central Sinai Egypt
