= Mahesh Desai =

Indian urologist

Mahesh Desai is an Indian urologist who treats various kidney and urological diseases in India. He performs renal transplants in Gujarat, India.

== Early life ==
Desai acquired his M.B.B.S. degree in 1966 from B.J. Medical College, Ahmedabad and his M.S. in General Surgery from Pune University. In 1973, he received a fellowship from the Royal College of Surgeons of London and Edinburgh, where he obtained specialized training in urology. He returned to India to start his practice and establish the importance of modern treatment for various kidney diseases in Ahmedabad. In collaboration with Dr V. V. Desai, he established Muljibhai Patel Urological Hospital (MPUH) at Nadiad, a rural area in the state of Gujarat in India. Desai aimed to help men with adequate medical facilities concerning their urological diseases.

== Career ==
He treats patients with techniques such as percutaneous nephrolithotripsy (PCNL), ureteroscopy and extracorporeal shock wave lithotripsy (ESWL). Desai performed over 14,000 PCNL procedures in his lifetime. Additionally, he expanded the use of ultrasound technology in urology and also established live kidney transplantation services for the first time in Gujarat. He performed the first renal transplant in Gujarat in 1980. More than 2,100 renal transplants have been carried out at MPUH under his supervision. He also organized the epidemiological survey of prostatic diseases for aging male population in Gujarat.

He is the managing trustee of MPUH and honorary managing director of Muljibhai Patel Society for Research in Nephrology-Urology and the medical director at MPUH and a director at Jayaramdas Patel Academic Centre, which is associated with the MPUH>

He has held urology and endourology positions both at the national and international levels. He was declared the president of the Society International d'Urologie (SIU) at the 31st World Congress held in Berlin, Germany. He is also the president-elect of The Endourological Society. He is the elected president of the Asian Society of Endourology. He was the president of the Urological Society of India, chairman of the Endourology Education Training Site Committee of Endourology Society Inc, and a member of the International Committee of American Urological Association. Desai is also the first Indian to become a member of the American Association of Genitourinary Surgeons.

Desai created the Centre for Robotic Surgery, a specialty technological initiative where a robot is used to perform nephro-urological (kidney & bladder) surgeries. Desai's research interests are endourology with special interest in urolithiasis, ultrasonography in urology, kidney transplantation, pediatric urology, urologic oncology and prostate cancer.

== Publications and presentations ==
Desai has conducted over 160 workshops and conferences in India. He has produced over 750 scientific papers, more than 120 of them in national and international journals. He is a frequent contributor to the Journal of Endourology.

He has presented over 250 lectures and has given talks at national and international seminars and conferences. Under his leadership, the World Congress on Endourology was held in Mumbai in November 2004, the first time that the congress had been held in India. In 2003, he was the first Indian guest lecturer to present a plenary session of American Urological Association's Annual Conference in Chicago.

== Honors and awards ==
Desai has several awards and accolades to his credit, including:

- Dr. B. C. Roy National Award by the President of India, 2000
- American Urological Association Presidential Citation 2012
- St Paul's Medal, British Association of Urological Surgeons, 2012
- President's Gold medal of Urological Society of India
- President's Gold Medal of West Zone Chapter of USI
- UNO's International Award for Medical Scientific Group in the field of Urology
- Late Dr. Piyush V. Patel Award for "Excellence in Medical Field" at the 105th Annual Day
- Celebration of Ahmedabad Medical Association on 24 June 2007
- Honorary Member of (1) Singapore Urological Association (2) Chinese Urology Association (3) Urological Society of Australia and New Zealand

== Personal life ==
Desai is married to Nalini Desai, who oversees the accounts and administrative division of MPUH.
