= Ralph Clayman =

American urologist and academic physician (born 1947)

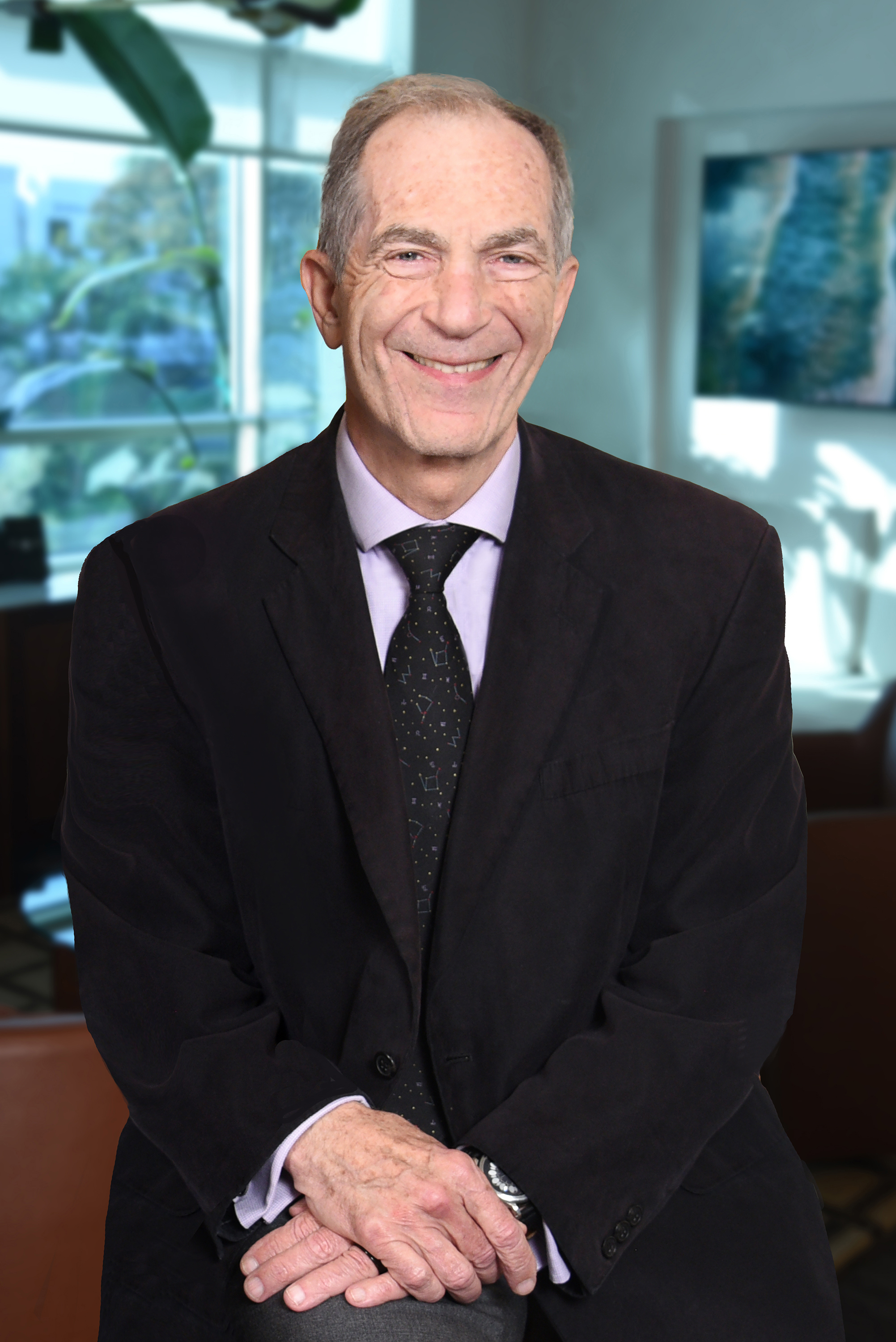
- Born: New York City, United States
- Education: Grinnell College (1969); University of California, San Diego School of Medicine (1973)
- Known for: Performing the first laparoscopic nephrectomy in 1990
- Spouse: Carol Heineman
- Children: 2
- Awards: Honorary Fellow, Royal College of Surgeons of Edinburgh (2011); St. Paul’s Medal, British Association of Urological Surgeons (2009); Hugh Hampton Young Award (American Urological Association) (1999)
- Scientific career
- Fields: Urology; Laparoscopy; endoscopy; urolithiasis (kidney stone disease); renal cancer
- Workplaces: University of California, Irvine; Washington University in St. Louis

Ralph V. Clayman (born November 3, 1947) is an American urologist and academic physician. He is a distinguished professor of urology and dean emeritus at the University of California, Irvine School of Medicine. He is known for performing the first laparoscopic nephrectomy in 1990.

== Early life and education ==
Clayman was born in New York City and raised in New Jersey. He earned a Bachelor of Arts with honors from Grinnell College in 1969 and received his Doctor of Medicine degree from the UC San Diego School of Medicine in 1973. He completed his internship and residency training in surgery and urology at the University of Minnesota in 1979, including a research year focused on cholesterol metabolism in renal cell carcinoma.

== Academic and clinical career ==
Clayman served as a tenured professor of urology and radiology at Washington University School of Medicine. During this period, he established the first formal fellowship program in endourology.

In 1990, Clayman performed the first laparoscopic removal of a kidney in a patient. He subsequently was part of the surgical team that performed the first laparoscopic prostatectomy and advanced endoscopic approaches for kidney stone disease and renal tumors.

In 2002, Clayman became the founding chair of the Department of Urology at the University of California, Irvine School of Medicine, where he led the department until 2009. From 2009 to 2014, he served as Dean of the UCI School of Medicine.

Following his deanship, Clayman was appointed distinguished professor of urology and later dean emeritus. He formally retired in 2023 and was rehired part-time, continuing his clinical and research work in urolithiasis and co-directing UCI’s Curiosity and Innovation Laboratory.

Clayman is a co-founder of the Endourology Society and of the Journal of Endourology, serving as co-editor-in-chief of the journal for 34 years until 2020.

His research focuses on laparoscopy, endoscopy, urolithiasis (kidney stone disease), renal cancer, ureteral obstruction, and surgical instrumentation, with emphasis on integrating clinical practice with technological development. Clayman’s work includes the development of instrumentation and techniques for minimally invasive diagnosis and treatment.

== Scholarly works ==
He has authored over 500 peer-reviewed publications and holds 26 patents. He co-authored Techniques in Endourology (1984) and Laparoscopic Urology (1993). He is also the sole author of The Compleat Dean (2016)

== Personal life ==
Clayman is married to Carol Heineman since 1974 and has two children.

== Awards ==
- St. Paul’s Medal, British Association of Urological Surgeons (2009)
- Honorary Fellow, Royal College of Surgeons of Edinburgh (2011)
- Ramon Guiteras Lifetime Achievement Award, American Urological Association (2010)
- Keyes Medal American Association of GU Surgeons (2023)
- Innovator’s Award (American Urological Association) (1998)
- Hugh Hampton Young Award (American Urological Association) (1999)
- Ramon Guiteras Lectureship (2000) and Lattimer Lectureship (2023) (American Urological Association)
- Barringer Medal (2002) and Keyes Medal (2023), American Association of GU Surgeons
