= Ranjith Ramasamy =

American researcher and urologist

- Education: Rutgers University (2007); Weill Cornell Medicine (2013); Baylor College of Medicine (2015)
- Known for: Research in the field of male infertility and sexual dysfunction
- Awards: American Society for Reproductive Medicine Award, (2020); Gold Cystoscope Award, (2023)
- Scientific career
- Fields: Urology; Male infertility; Andrology; Hypogonadism
- Workplaces: University of Miami

Ranjith Ramasamy is a former consultant urologist at Jumeirah American Clinic in Dubai, UAE, and the former Director of the Reproductive Urology Fellowship program at the University of Miami's Miller School of Medicine. He was arrested in 2026 for sexual battery of multiple male medical students over a several-year period.

An American medical researcher and urologist, Ramasamy is known for academic contributions to reproductive medicine, including testosterone deficiency, regenerative therapy, erectile dysfunction, and prostate cancer studies. Ramasamy has co-authored a significant number of publications in the domain of male infertility and sexual dysfunction. Ramasamy is a recipient of the American Society for Reproductive Medicine Award.

== Education ==
Ramasamy graduated with a B.S degree in Cell Biology and Neuroscience from Rutgers University in 2003. He continued to study at Rutgers, receiving his medical degree there in 2007. Ramasamy completed his urology residency training at Weill Cornell Medicine and NewYork-Presbyterian Hospital in 2013. He did his medical research on a fellowship, sponsored by the National Institutes of Health, in Male Reproductive Medicine and Microsurgery at Baylor College of Medicine in 2015.

== Career ==
Since 2005, Ramasamy has contributed to medical research and publications in medical journals on the subject of Leydig stem cells, Testosterone Deficiency, Regenerative therapy, erectile dysfunction, prostate cancer, among others. His main research areas of interests are in male infertility and sexual dysfunction.

In 2020–21, Ramasamy contributed to research of coronavirus impact on male fertility and sexually transmitted diseases.

Ramasamy has been instrumental in creating a urology app intended to prepare medical students and trainees for urology board examinations. He also serves as a reviewer for medical professional journals, including European Urology, Fertility and Sterility, The Journal of Urology, BJU International, Urology, the Indian Journal of Urology, and others

Ramasamy has been among the first urology specialists to research and discover the impact of COVID-19 on male infertility and erectile dysfunction. His work, along with other researchers, has been published in The World Journal of Men's Health, contributed to understanding of the COVID-19 infection and its relation to causing the underlying endothelial dysfunction, a condition in which the small blood vessels fail to perform normally and damage male erectile system.

Ramasamy is also a recipient of the 2019 George Paff Teaching Award of Excellence for teaching urology to Miller School of Medicine students.

Ramasamy also found and validated that males who have recovered from SARS-CoV-2 acute phase are unlikely to be a source for sexual transmissions of SARS-CoV-2. Further investigation into sperm parameters before and after the COVID-19 mRNA vaccine was published in JAMA Network in 2022.

In September 2021, based on the previous work "Phase II Randomized, Clinical Trial Evaluating 2 Schedules of Low-Intensity Shockwave Therapy for the Treatment of Erectile Dysfunction", Ramasamy became a principal researcher for the “Combined Shockwave Therapy and Platelet Rich Plasma for the Treatment of Erectile Dysfunction” study that is funded by a three-year grant provided by the National Institutes of Health.

In 2023, Ramasamy received the Gold Cystoscope Award for creative impactful work in andrology, mentorship, clinical scholarship and research.

In 2025, Ramasamy was the first to report a pregnancy using AI-assisted sperm search in a man with Non-Obstructive Azoospermia.

== Criminal Claims ==
Ramasamy was arrested in Miami in 2026 on claims that he had sexually assaulted prior students. These claims included performing unnecessary, repeated prostate examinations, sensitive genital exams and falsifying laboratory reports. A medical expert had deemed these examinations unnecessary, with the charges against him surrounding sexual battery and assault. He returned from the United Arab Emirates due to these claims.

== Selected works ==
- "Clinical utility of sperm DNA fragmentation testing: practice recommendations based on clinical scenarios", A Agarwal, A Majzoub, SC Esteves, E Ko, R Ramasamy, A Zini...,Translational Andrology and Urology 5 (6), 935, (2016)
- "Successful fertility treatment for Klinefelter's syndrome", R Ramasamy, JA Ricci, GD Palermo, LV Gosden, Z Rosenwaks,...,The Journal of urology 182 (3), 1108–1113, (2009)
- "Structural and functional changes to the testis after conventional versus microdissection testicular sperm extraction", R Ramasamy, N Yagan, PN Schlegel..., Urology 65 (6), 1190–1194, (2005)
- "The role of estradiol in male reproductive function", M Schulster, AM Bernie, R Ramasamy...,Asian journal of andrology 18 (3), 435, (2016)
- "High serum FSH levels in men with nonobstructive azoospermia does not affect success of microdissection testicular sperm extraction", R Ramasamy, K Lin, LV Gosden, Z Rosenwaks, GD Palermo, ..., Fertility and sterility 92 (2), 590–593, (2009)
- "Bibliometrics: tracking research impact by selecting the appropriate metrics", A Agarwal, D Durairajanayagam, S Tatagari, SC Esteves, A Harlev, Ranjith Ramasamy,..., Asian journal of andrology 18 (2), 296, (2016)
- "Comparison of microdissection testicular sperm extraction, conventional testicular sperm extraction, and testicular sperm aspiration for nonobstructive azoospermia: a systematic review and meta-analysis", AM Bernie, DA Mata, R Ramasamy, PN Schlegel..., Fertility and sterility, 104 (5), 1099–1103. e3, (2015)
- "Role of optimizing testosterone before microdissection testicular sperm extraction in men with nonobstructive azoospermia", JE Reifsnyder, R Ramasamy, J Husseini, PN Schlegel..., The Journal of urology 188 (2), 532–537, (2012)
- "Microdissection testicular sperm extraction: effect of prior biopsy on success of sperm retrieval", R Ramasamy, PN Schlegel..., The Journal of urology 177 (4), 1447–1449, (2007)
- "Effects of low-intensity extracorporeal shockwave therapy on erectile dysfunction: a systematic review and meta-analysis", RI Clavijo, TP Kohn, JR Kohn, R Ramasamy..., The Journal of sexual medicine 14 (1), 27–35, (2017)
- "Sperm Parameters Before and After COVID-19 mRNA Vaccination", Daniel C. Gonzalez, Daniel E. Nassau, Kajal Khodamoradi, Emad Ibrahim, Ruben Blachman-Braun, Jesse Ory, Ranjith Ramasamy, JAMA Network 326(3), 273–274, (2021)
- "Phase II Randomized, Clinical Trial Evaluating 2 Schedules of Low-Intensity Shockwave Therapy for the Treatment of Erectile Dysfunction", Premal Patel, Jonathan Katz, Soum D Lokeshwar, Manuel Molina, Isildinha M Reis, Raul Clavijo, Ranjith Ramasamy, The Journal of sexual medicine, 8(2):214-222, (2020)
- "Testosterone supplementation versus clomiphene citrate for hypogonadism: an age matched comparison of satisfaction and efficacy", Ranjith Ramasamy, Jason M Scovell, Jason R Kovac, Larry I Lipshultz, Comparative Study, 192(3):875-9, (2014)

== Extra links ==
- Ranjith Ramasamy on Google Scholar
- Ira and Ester Rosenwaks New Investigator Award (2020)
- George Paff Teaching Award (2019)
- https://www.nbcmiami.com/news/local/ex-um-doctor-and-professor-accused-of-sexually-battering-students-police-say/3848811/
