= Gaetano Ciancio =

Italian American surgeon

- Born: Roccapiemonte, Italy
- Education: Central University of Venezuela (MD)
- Occupations: Transplant surgeon, urologic oncologist

Gaetano Ciancio is an Italian American surgeon at the University of Miami who specializes in kidney transplant. He is the chief medical and academic officer of the Miami Transplant Institute and the director of its Kidney & Kidney-Pancreas Programs. His most significant contributions to medicine are related to surgically treating kidney cancer once it has spread to the inferior vena cava and in optimizing the immunosuppression protocol after kidney transplant.

== Early life and education ==
Ciancio was born on June 15, 1956, in Roccapiemonte, Italy. He received his Doctor of Medicine from Central University of Venezuela, then completed his residency at the University of Miami's Jackson Memorial Hospital in Miami, followed by completing a fellowship in multiorgan transplant surgery.

== Research ==
=== Large kidney tumors ===
Ciancio developed techniques for the surgical resection of large kidney tumors. His results demonstrated that by performing a liver mobilization, urological oncologists could avoid a thoracic incision in many patients

=== Inferior vena cava thrombectomy ===
Building on the techniques described for resecting large renal tumors, Ciancio adapted his liver mobilization technique to address retrohepatic or even suprahepatic inferior vena caval thrombus associated with renal tumors.

Together with his long time collaborator Mark Soloway, they published a step-by-step guide toward resecting renal cell carcinoma with associated inferior vena cava thrombus.

=== Immunosuppression ===
Ciancio helped develop and popularize alternative immunosuppression regimens which successfully lowered the dose of immunosuppressants without increasing organ rejection.

=== Reconstruction during kidney transplantation ===
During kidney transplantation, the most common arterial reconstruction is for a single renal artery to be anastomosed to the external iliac artery. Ciancio has popularized several techniques for dealing with anatomical variations, including the usage of the inferior epigastric artery to anastomose to a small upper-pole artery.

Additionally, Ciancio has been part of the Miami Transplant Team that developed the bladder patch technique, where for various indications the kidney together with the ureter and some amount of donor bladder are transplanted en-bloc.

=== Pancreatic transplantation ===
Together with George Burke, Ciancio has made contributions to the field of pancreas transplantations both regarding management of surgical complications and immunosuppression strategies, including publishing a technique for thrombectomy for complete venous thrombosis of the transplanted pancreas.

== Awards and honors ==
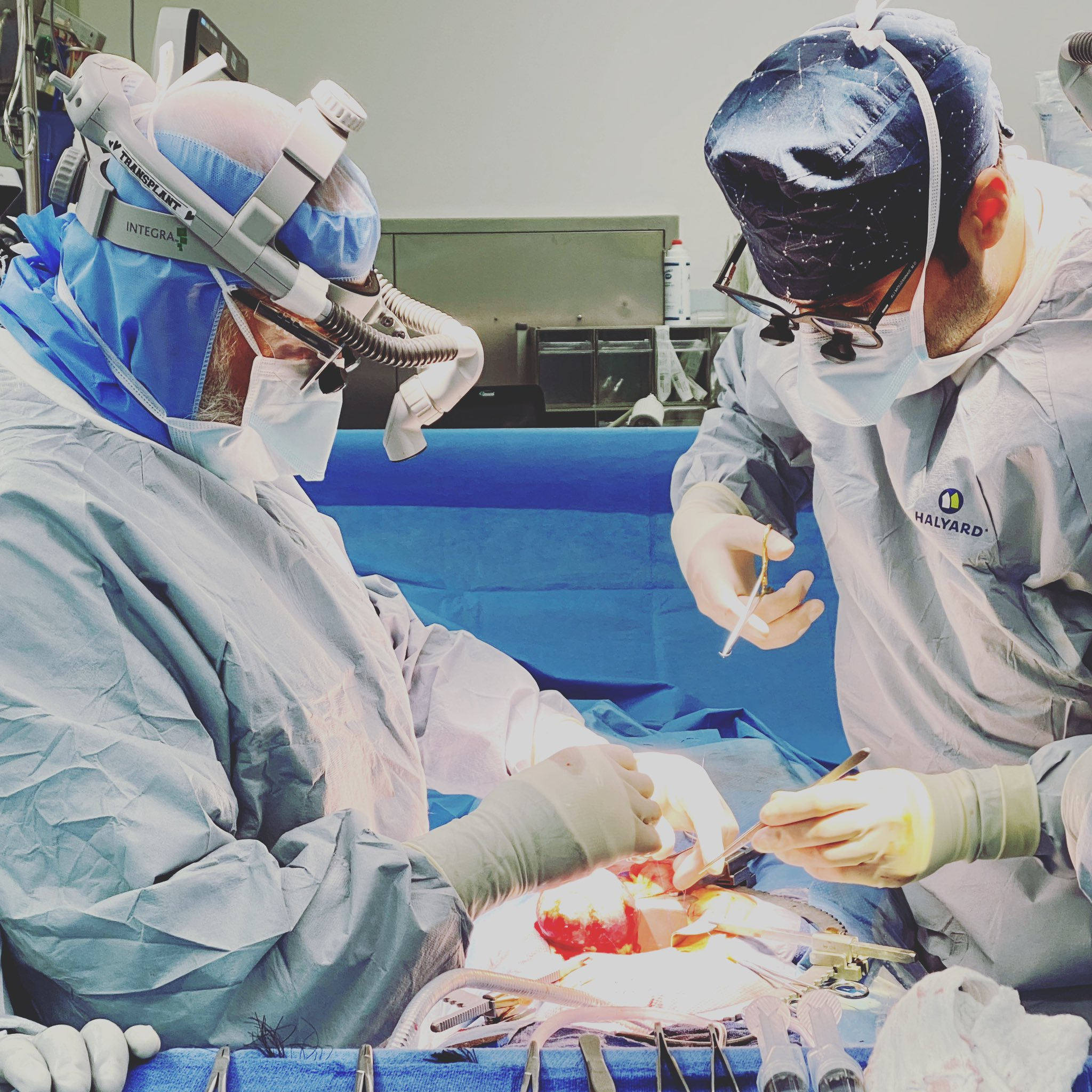
Ciancio taking Ali Mouzannar (Urology Resident) through a living related kidney transplant

In 2013, he served as President of the Urologic Society for Transplantation and Renal Surgery. He was knighted in Italy by Sergio Mattarella and is a member of the Order of Merit of the Italian Republic

== Bibliography ==
He is an author or co-author of two books, 30 book chapters, and over 388 peer-reviewed articles published in medical journals for topics involving the field of solid organ transplantation and urologic oncology.
