= Mansoura, Egypt =

Mansoura المنصورة (Arabic)
- City
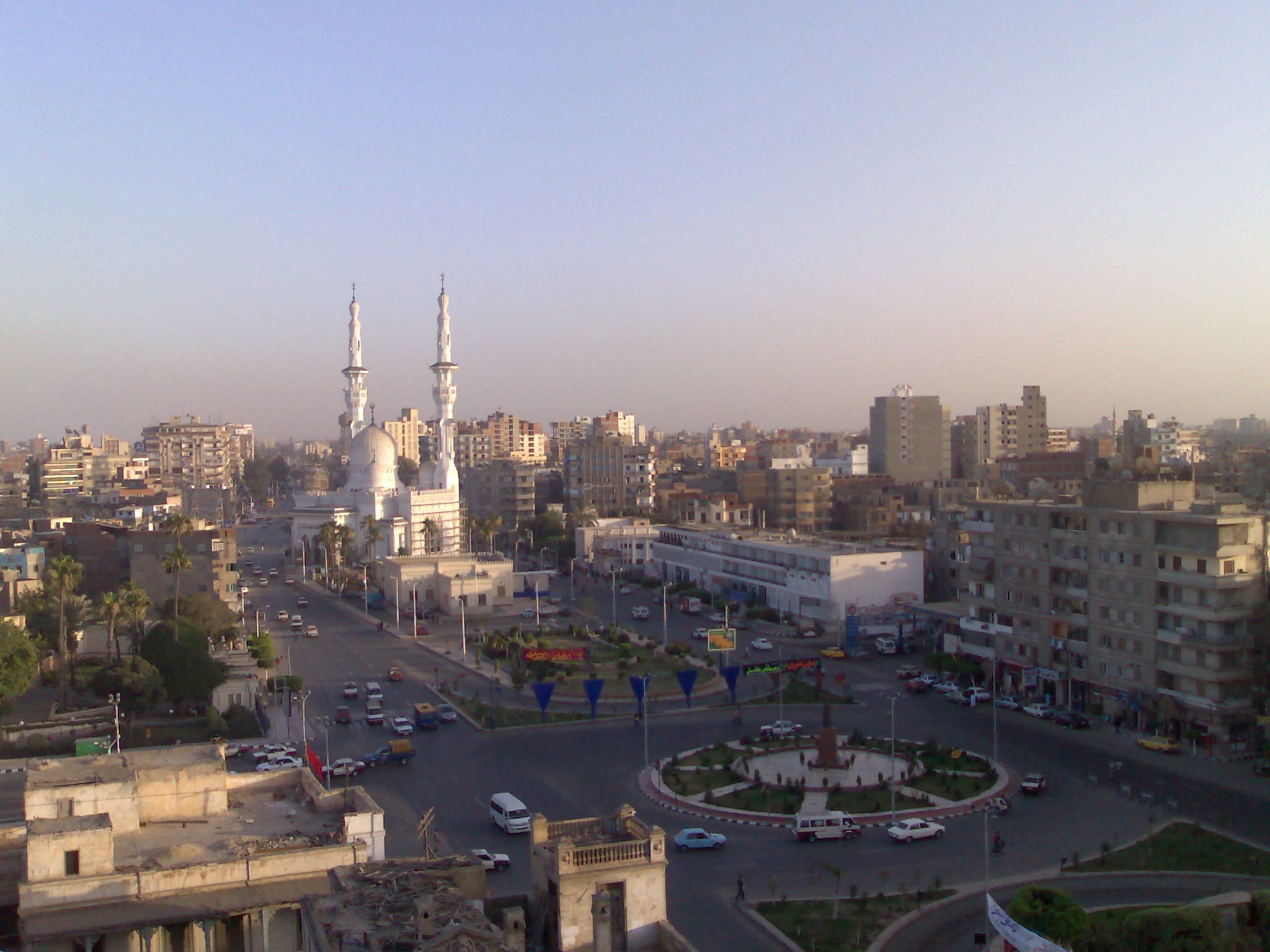
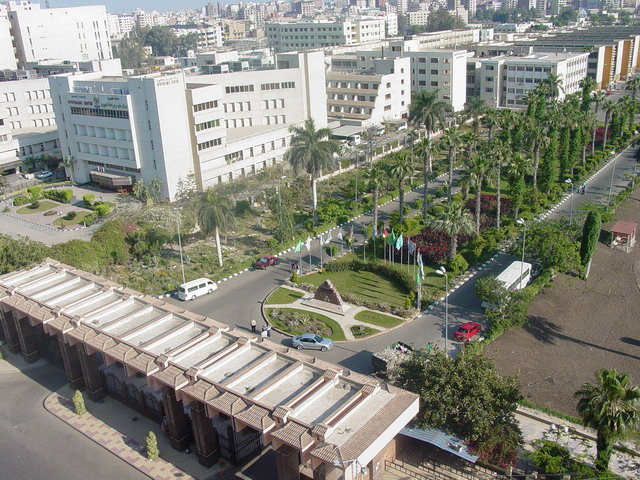
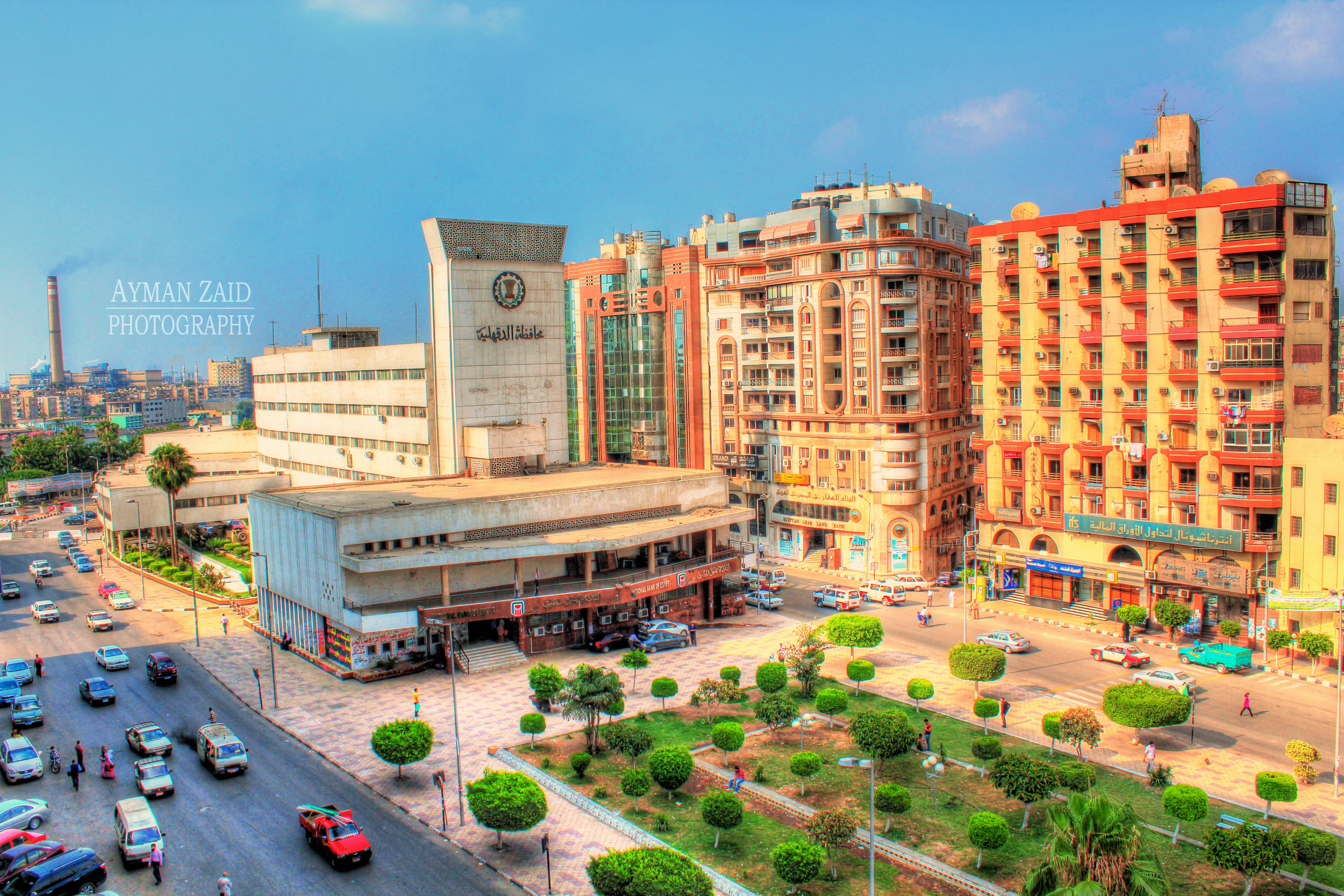
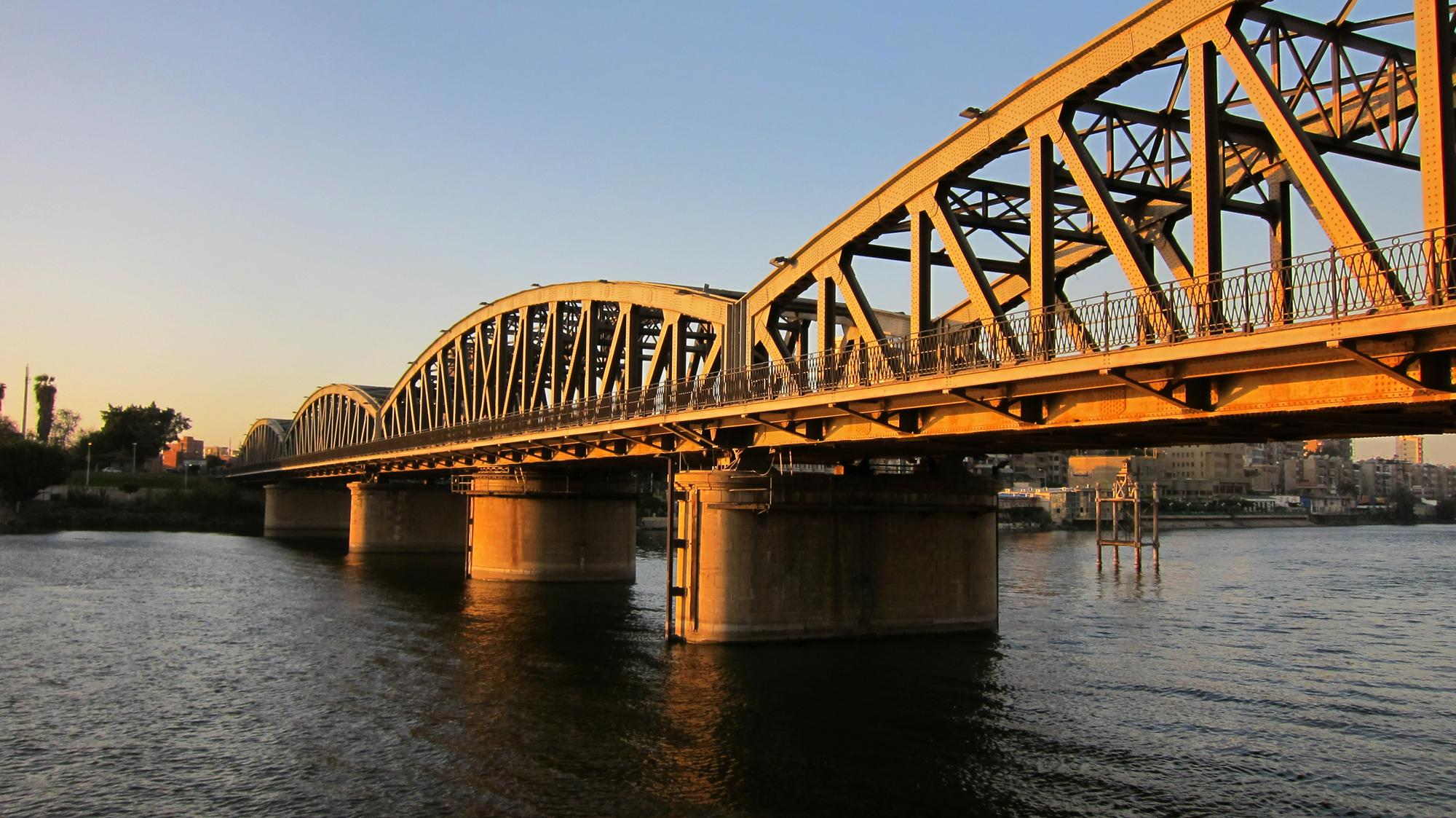
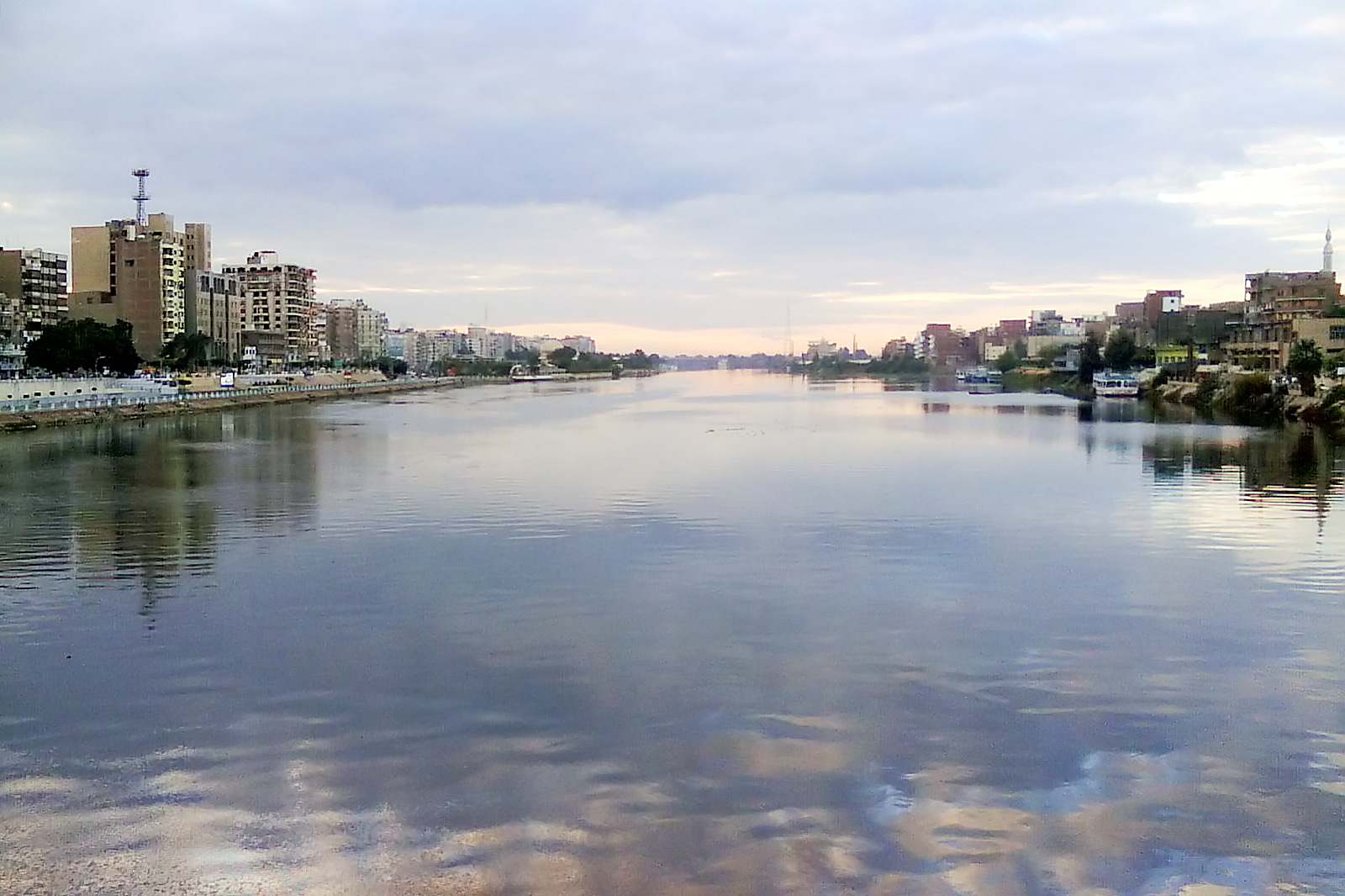
- Umm Kulthum Square in Downtown Mansoura University Governorate headquarters Mansoura Bridge The Nile
- Nickname: The Nile's Bride
- The Nile Delta

- Location in Egypt
- Coordinates: 31°2′25″N 31°22′58″E
- Country: Egypt
- Governorate: Dakahlia
- Founded: 1219

Government
  - Governor: Ayman AbdelMenem Mohtar Hasnan

Area
  - Total: 28.2 km^{2} (10.9 sq mi)
- Elevation: 15 m (49 ft)

Population (2024)
  - Total: 600,000
  - Density: 21,000/km^{2} (55,000/sq mi)

GDP (nominal, constant 2015 values)
  - Year: 2024
  - Total: $3.8 billion
  - Per capita: $6,333
- Time zone: UTC+2 (EET)
  - Summer (DST): UTC+3 (EEST)
- Area code: +(20) 50
- Website: www.dakahliya.gov.eg

Mansoura (Egyptian Arabic: المنصورة, romanized: El Manṣūra, IPA: [el.mɑnˈsˤuːɾɑ], locally [el.mænˈsˤuːɾe]; lit. 'The Victorious') is a city in Egypt located on the eastern bank of the Damietta branch of the Nile river. The city is the capital of the Dakahlia Governorate and has an estimated population of 600,000 as of 2024.

== Etymology ==
Mansoura (منصورة) in Arabic means 'victorious'. The city is named after the El Mansoura Battle (1250) against Louis IX of France during the Seventh Crusade.

== History ==
Mansoura was established in 1219 by al-Kamil of the Ayyubid dynasty upon the Phatnitic branch of the Nile on the site of several older villages, such as Al-Bishtamir (البشطمير) and Kafr al-Badamas (كفر البدماص, from Ancient Greek ποταμός 'river, canal'). After the Egyptians defeated the Crusaders during the Seventh Crusade, the city was named Mansoura.

In the Seventh Crusade, the Capetians were defeated and put to flight; between fifteen and thirty thousand of their men fell on the battlefield. Louis IX of France was captured in the main Battle of Fariskur, and confined in the house of Ibrahim Ibn Lokman, secretary of the sultan, and under the guard of the eunuch Sobih. The king's brother was imprisoned in the same house. The sultan provided for their sustenance. The house of Ibrahim Ibn Lokman is now the only museum in Mansoura. It is open to the public and houses articles that used to belong to the French monarch, including his personal thirteenth century toilet.

The Mansoura Air Battle on October 14, 1973, occurred during the Yom Kippur War. Israeli Air Force fighters attacking Egyptian air bases were intercepted by the Egyptian Air Force. On that day, 160 jet fighters, most of which belonging to Israel, battled for 53 minutes over Mansoura. The Egyptian army claimed that despite the numerical and qualitative superiority of the Israeli warplanes, 17 Israeli planes were downed. (2 according to the Israelis), while the rest retreated. Egypt announced the loss of six planes, only three of which fell to Israeli fire. The Egyptian government subsequently changed the country's "Air Force Day" from November 2 to October 14, to commemorate the Mansoura Air Battle.

== Geography ==
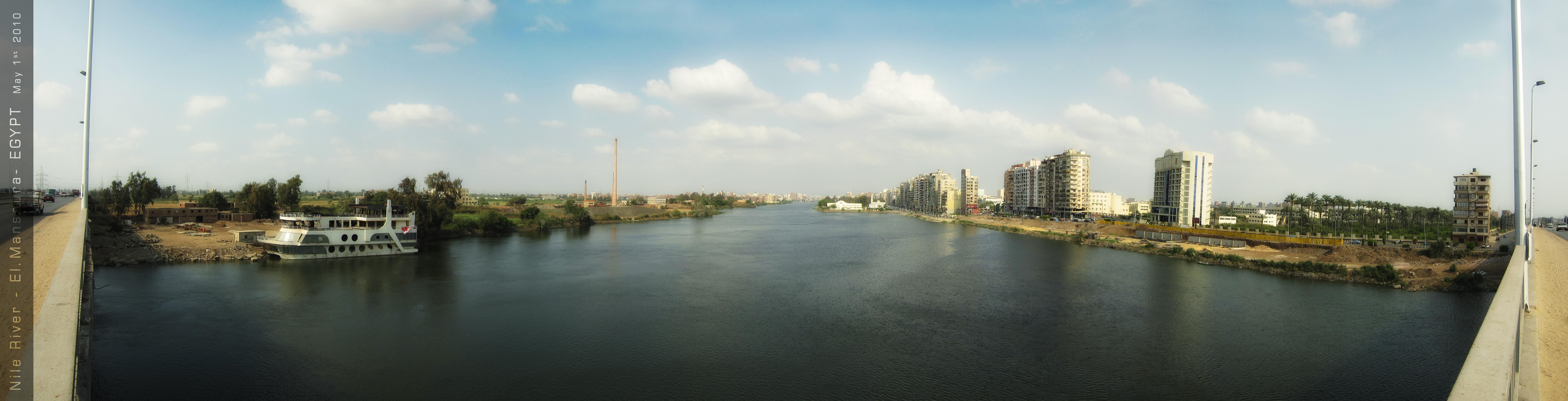
View of the Nile

=== Location ===
Mansoura lies on the east bank of the Damietta branch of the Nile, in the Delta region. Mansoura is about 120 km northeast of Cairo. Across from the city, on the opposite bank of the Nile, is the town of Talkha.

=== Climate ===
Köppen-Geiger climate classification system classifies its climate as hot desert (BWh).

Climate data for Mansoura
Month	Jan	Feb	Mar	Apr	May	Jun	Jul	Aug	Sep	Oct	Nov	Dec	Year
Mean daily maximum °C (°F)	19.7 (67.5)	20.5 (68.9)	23.1 (73.6)	27.4 (81.3)	31.6 (88.9)	33.9 (93.0)	35.1 (95.2)	34.8 (94.6)	32.9 (91.2)	30.5 (86.9)	26.2 (79.2)	21.5 (70.7)	28.1 (82.6)
Daily mean °C (°F)	13.4 (56.1)	14.0 (57.2)	16.2 (61.2)	19.8 (67.6)	23.8 (74.8)	26.3 (79.3)	27.8 (82.0)	27.8 (82.0)	26.1 (79.0)	24.0 (75.2)	20.3 (68.5)	15.4 (59.7)	21.2 (70.2)
Mean daily minimum °C (°F)	7.1 (44.8)	7.4 (45.3)	9.4 (48.9)	12.1 (53.8)	15.9 (60.6)	18.7 (65.7)	20.4 (68.7)	20.8 (69.4)	19.3 (66.7)	17.6 (63.7)	14.4 (57.9)	9.3 (48.7)	14.4 (57.9)
Average rainfall mm (inches)	11 (0.4)	9 (0.4)	7 (0.3)	3 (0.1)	3 (0.1)	0 (0)	0 (0)	0 (0)	0 (0)	3 (0.1)	8 (0.3)	10 (0.4)	54 (2.1)
Average relative humidity (%)	82	78	75	68	60	61	68	73	78	80	82	82	74
Source: Arab Meteorology Book

== Culture ==
Folklore show in Mansoura

The Egyptian Arabic dialect spoken by Mansoura's population is a Northern Egyptian Arabic dialect, with noticeable influences from the city's surrounding rural villages, each of which has contributed to the city's population over the years. There are also similarities to Alexandrian Egyptian Arabic in some aspects of pronunciation.

The Mansoura National Museum used to be Dar Ibn Lockman, the house where Louis IX was imprisoned in 1250 during the Seventh Crusade. Displayed in the museum are the suits of mail and swords of the crusaders, as well as a collection of maps. Huge paintings depict the Battle of Mansoura.

The Mansoura branch of the National Library was inaugurated in 2008 as the Mansoura Misr Library.

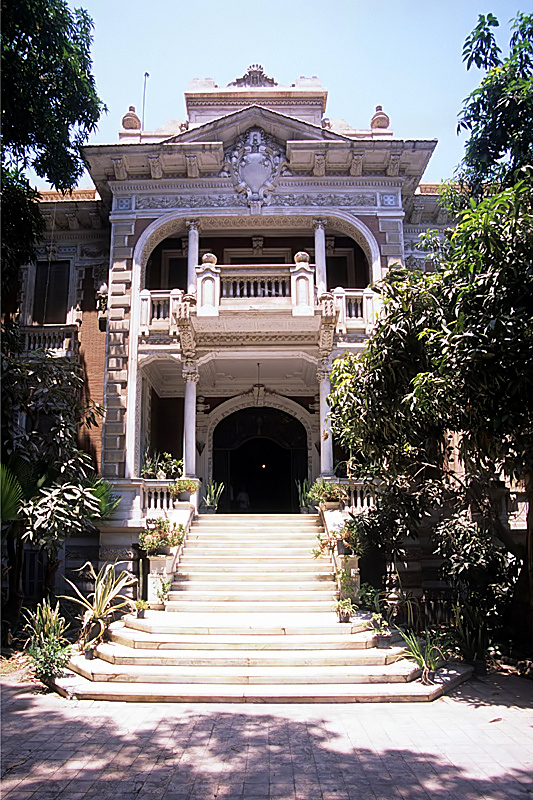
Entrance to the Shinnawi Palace

Mansoura is famous for its architectural style, especially the Shinnawi Palace (after Mohamed Bek El-Shinnawi, a member of the Wafd Party). It was built by an Italian architect in 1928. The mosque of El-Saleh Ayoub El-Kebir is one of the most important in Mansoura. It was built by a loyal servant of the Sultan and is located in Al-Sagha Street that separates "Old Mansoura" from the modern city.

Like Cairo, Alexandria and Port Said, Mansoura was home to a flourishing Greek community Many of the older and best established shops and businesses around the city still bear their original Greek names. Mansoura also had a small Italian population living in the city too. The first Old English school in the city was established on the site of the old Greek school in the Toriel area, one of the traditionally relatively affluent residential districts of the city.

Al-Mansoura joined the UNESCO Global Network of Learning Cities in 2025.

== Infrastructure ==
=== Education ===
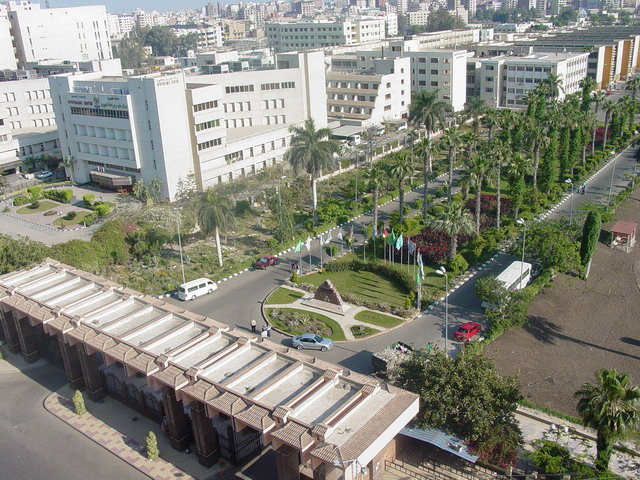
University of Mansoura

The University of Mansoura was founded in 1962, initially as a branch of Cairo University. The Urology and Nephrology center of Mansoura University founded by Prof Mohammed Ghonem is considered to be the best kidney center in the Middle East and Africa.

=== Sports ===
Mansoura has a sports stadium (Mansoura Stadium) which is home to its football team.

- Gezert Elward Sport Club: It is located directly on the Nile and has tennis courts, swimming, gymnastics, squash and social club. Recently, the gymnastics team participated under the seven-year club in the Republic Championship and received 2 gold medals 13 silver and 1 bronze and 1 participation.
- Mansoura Sports Club: It has an official football field.
- Mansoura Sports Stadium: It has an official football field, swimming pool, social club and many sports facilities.
- The Olympic Village (Mansoura University Stadium): It covers an area of 15 acres and is open to university students, faculty members and those wishing to play abroad in individual and group games.

== Notable people ==
- Kareem Abu-Elmagd, Egyptian-American organ transplant surgeon
- Ahmed El-Ghandour (Da7ee7), YouTuber and educator
- Mohamed Ghoneim, urologist
- Faten Hamama, actress
- Ahmed Hamdi, engineer
- Ahmed Hamed, Olympic pentathlete
- Anis Mansour; writer
- Hassan El-Imam, film director, titled Box-office King
- Gad al-Haq Ali Gad al-Haq, Grand Imam of Al-Azhar from 1982 to 1996; public figure and Islamic scholar
- Pope Tawadros II, Pope of Alexandria & Patriarch of All Africa on the Holy Apostolic See of Saint Mark the Evangelist of the Coptic Orthodox Church of Alexandria
- Adel Emam, actor
- Ibrahim Salah; footballer
- Hesham Sallam, paleontologist
- Soheir Zaki, dancer

== See also ==
- List of cities and towns in Egypt
- Central Library - Mansoura University
