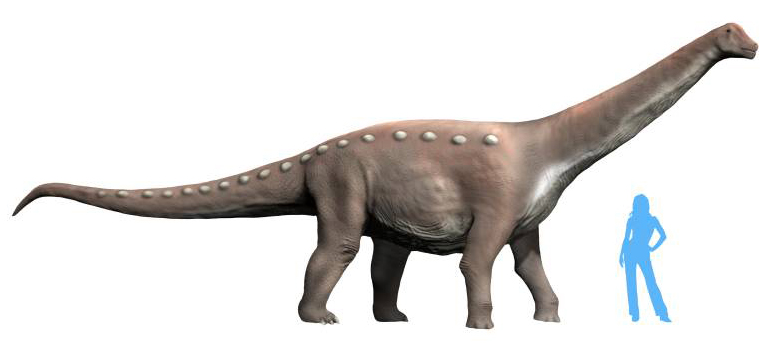
- Restoration

Scientific classification
- Kingdom: Animalia
- Phylum: Chordata
- Class: Reptilia
- Clade: Dinosauria
- Clade: Saurischia
- Clade: †Sauropodomorpha
- Clade: †Sauropoda
- Clade: †Macronaria
- Clade: †Titanosauria
- Clade: †Lithostrotia
- Genus: †Mansourasaurus; Sallam et al., 2018

Type species
- Mansourasaurus shahinae Sallam et al., 2018

= Mansourasaurus =

Mansourasaurus Temporal range: Late Cretaceous, 74–72 Ma

Extinct genus of dinosaurs

Dakhla Oasis, Egypt, where the first Mansourasaurus was discovered

Mansourasaurus ("Mansoura lizard") is a genus of herbivorous lithostrotian sauropod dinosaur from the Quseir Formation of Egypt. The type and only species is Mansourasaurus shahinae.

The discovery of Mansourasaurus was considered quite significant by paleontologists, because very few Late Cretaceous sauropod remains have been found in Africa, where the rocky strata that preserve remains elsewhere and produce rich fossil beds were typically not found exposed at or near ground level.

== Discovery and naming ==
Voice of America report about the discovery

Hesham Sallam, a paleontologist at Mansoura University, together with a team of students, discovered a sauropod skeleton in the Dakhla Oasis in Egypt's Western Desert. In 2016, it was reported that over thirty dinosaur specimens had been excavated, among them titanosaurian sauropods.

Based on this skeleton, the type species Mansourasaurus shahinae was named and described in January 2018 by Hesham M. Sallam, Eric Gorscak, Patrick M. O'Connor, Iman A. El-Dawoudi, Sanaa El-Sayed, Sara Saber, Mahmoud A. Kora, Joseph J. W. Sertich, Erik R. Seiffert, and Matthew C. Lamanna. The generic name refers to the Mansoura University. The specific name honours Mona Shahin, one of the founders of the Mansoura University Vertebrate Paleontology Center.

The Mansourasaurus specimen described in 2018 is its holotype, MUVP 200, discovered in a layer of the Quseir Formation dating from the late Campanian, about seventy-three million years old. It consists of a partial skeleton with skull and lower jaws. It contains a fragment of the skull roof, a part of the lower braincase, the dentaries of the lower jaws, three neck vertebrae, two back vertebrae, eight ribs, the right scapula, the right coracoid, both humeri, a radius, a third metacarpal, three metatarsals, and parts of osteoderms. The skeleton was found on a surface of four by three metres. It was not articulated. The authors concluded that the holotype is a juvenile specimen because the bones of its shoulder girdle had not yet fused. An ulna, specimen MUVP 201, found at twenty metres distance from the skeleton, was not referred to the species as it seemed somewhat too large for the holotype individual and a general connection to the species could not be proven.

== Description ==
The not fully-grown holotype individual was about 8–10 metres (26–33 ft) long. It probably weighed about 5,000 kg, approximately the same as a bull African elephant.

The describing authors indicated a number of distinguishing traits. These are autapomorphies, unique derived characters. Each lower jaw dentary bears ten teeth. Where the dentaries touch each other, at the front of the lower jaws, they possess a common "chin", equalling a third of the front height. The horizontal groove in the inner side of the dentary, the fossa Meckeliana, largely opens to below. The anterior middle neck vertebrae are pierced by a foramen in the rear side. In at least one anterior middle neck vertebra, the parapophysis, the process which bears the facet for the lower rib head, has a horizontal length equal to the vertebral centrum as a whole. With some anterior neck vertebrae, the bone web between the heads of the neck rib is pierced by a foramen. The lower end of the radius has a transverse width four times larger than the width measured from the front to the rear.

== Phylogeny ==
Mansourasaurus was placed in the Titanosauria in a derived position as a sister species of Lohuecotitan. A cladistic analysis showed it to belong to a clade of otherwise largely Eurasian sauropods, also including Ampelosaurus, Lirainosaurus, Nemegtosaurus, Opisthocoelicaudia, and Paludititan, more or less contemporaneous forms. Hypotheses about relationships between Late Cretaceous African and Eurasian sauropods had been hard to test because very few of their remains had been found in Africa. Mansourasaurus represents the best-known continental African (i.e., excluding Madagascar) titanosaur of the Upper Cretaceous from the time period after the Cenomanian. Its existence would show that the continent was far less isolated from the various Eurasian landmasses than had been assumed. The ancestors of Mansourasaurus would have reached Africa from Europe.

== See also ==
- 2018 in paleontology
