= Kareem Mohamed Abu-Elmagd =

Egyptian-American organ transplant surgeon (born 1952)

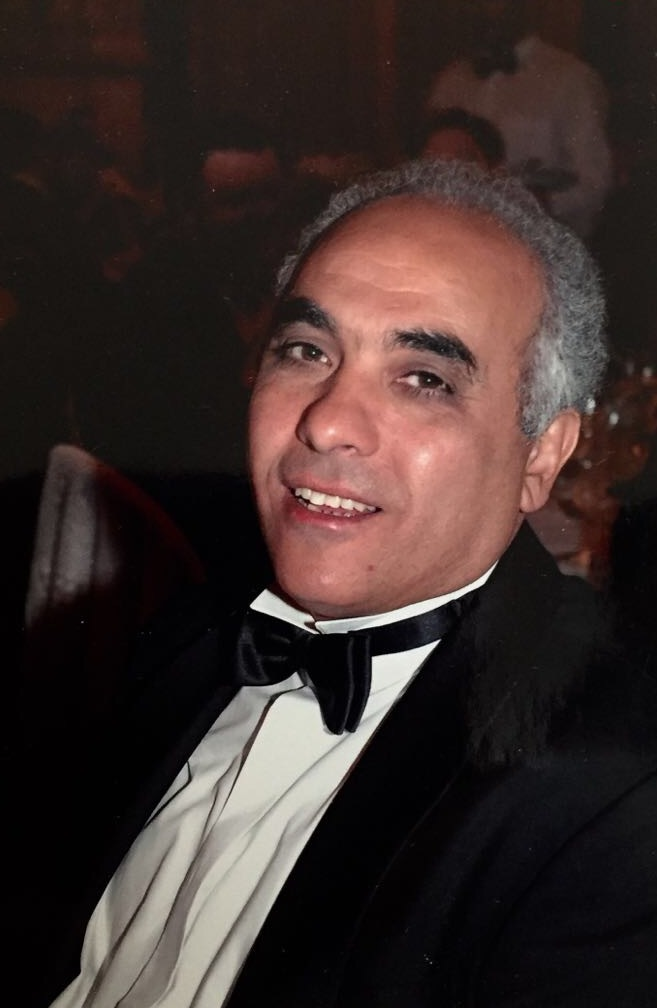
- Born: Kareem Mohamed Abu-Elmagd, June 16, 1952 (age 74); Mansoura, Egypt
- Education: Mansoura University
- Occupation: Professor of surgery
- Children: Adam and Ahmed
- Medical career
- Field: Transplant Surgery, Gut Rehabilitation
- Institutions: Case Western Reserve University - Cleveland Clinic
- Sub-specialties: Intestinal/multivisceral transplantation; Gut rehabilitation; Portal hypertensive surgery

Kareem Abu-Elmagd (born June 16, 1952) is an Egyptian-American surgeon practicing abdominal organ transplantation and digestive system surgery. He is best known for development of clinical intestinal and multivisceral transplantation and its subsequent approval by Medicare. He served as the president of the Intestinal Transplant Association.

== Biography ==
Abu-Elmagd was born in Mansoura, the capital of Dakahlia Governorate in 1952. In 1976 he obtained his medical degree at Mansoura University School of Medicine. In 1987 earned his PhD in liver diseases and portal hypertensive surgery through a joint collaboration between Emory University in Atlanta and Mansoura University. In 1989, he joined the University of Pittsburgh to obtain clinical fellowship in transplantation surgery. In 2001, he was promoted to professor of surgery at the University of Pittsburgh.

In 1989, he was introduced to the field of organ transplantation by the late professor Thomas E. Starzl, the father of modern transplantation. after that in 1990, Abu-Elmagd and his colleagues launched an intestinal and multivisceral transplant program which performed more than 450 intestine transplants surgery. As of 2020, Abu-Elmagd is professor of surgery at Case-Western Reserve University and the director of the gut rehabilitation and transplantation center at the Cleveland clinic. With more than 400 peer review scientific publications, as of 2020, his work has been cited close to 20,000 times between 2009 and 2017.

=== Professional career and contributions ===
Abu-Elmagd participated in performing the first successful intestinal transplantation under tacrolimus in 1990 at the University of Pittsburgh Later being a participant in the establishment of the clinical utility of tacrolimus in 1991. He was a part of the team which demonstrated the immune-protective effect of the concomitantly transplanted liver and the deleterious effect of DSA on the visceral allograft. His research led to the establishment of Medicare coverage for intestinal and multivisceral transplant in the United States. Abu-Elmagd pioneered or introduced surgical techniques and procedures, for correction of intestinal malrotation in children and adults, replacing the historic Ladd's procedure. Another technique developed by him utilized the patient's own gut for the effective management of gut failure, eliminating the need for intravenous nutrition commonly called TPN. An algorithm with a predictive model was established to guide clinicians, health care providers, payers and patients to achieve the best and most cost effective outcome, eliminating the need for gut transplantation.

Abu-Elmagd is the founder of the “Kareem Abu-Elmagd Transplant and Gut Foundation” national institute for patient care, clinical training, medical education and research in Egypt.

In 2019 he performed a pro bono operation for a 24-year-old woman from Bangladesh who had been suffering severe abdominal pain for a long time, without any known diagnosis. Her case involved reorganizing her intestines.
