= Hamdy Doweidar =

Egyptian condensed matter physicist

Hamdy Doweidar Taki El-Din Doweidar was an Egyptian condensed matter physicist whose research topics included inorganic glasses, glass-ceramics, bio-active glasses, and structure-property correlations. He developed the Doweidar Model which is used to correlate density, thermal expansion coefficient, molar refraction, and refractive index with the concentration of structural units in numerous types of glass. Doweidar also obtained a patent with two researchers for the preparation of a biologically active glass ionomer cement as a dental filling, characterized by vital activity due to the presence of bioactive crystalline phases in the retina glass (such as apatite and fluoroapatite), which react with SBF simulating solution to precipitate layers of hydroxyapatite and hydroxyapatite. These represent the basic crystalline phases in the formation of bones and teeth. He was a Professor Emeritus at the Mansoura University.

== Education and career ==
Doweidar graduated from Assiut University in 1964 with a bachelor's in physics and chemistry, a master's in Physical chemistry from Cairo University in 1969, and a Ph.D. in applied physics from Bauhaus-Universität Weimar in 1974. Doweidar was a researcher at the National Research Centre from 1965 to 1975 and became an associate professor at Mansoura University until 1986, when he became a Distinguished Professor. In 1977, Doweidar found the Glass Research Laboratory at the Mansoura University. He was a visiting professor at the École Normale Supérieure in Algeria from 1980 to 1984, and at the Sanaa University in Yemen from 1990 to 1994.

== Recognition ==
Doweidar has received the Award of Academy of Scientific Research and Technology (Promotional State-Prize in Physics), Cairo in 1999, the Mansoura University Award (Distinction Prize in Physics) in 2000, and the Scopus Award for contribution to materials Science, presented from Elsevier and the Egyptian Ministry of High Education in 2008. He has over 120 peer-reviewed publications in international journals and was named one of the world's top 2% most cited scientists by Stanford University in 2019, 2020, 2021, 2022, and 2023.
