= Mohamed Ghoneim =

Urologist and world leader in kidney transplants

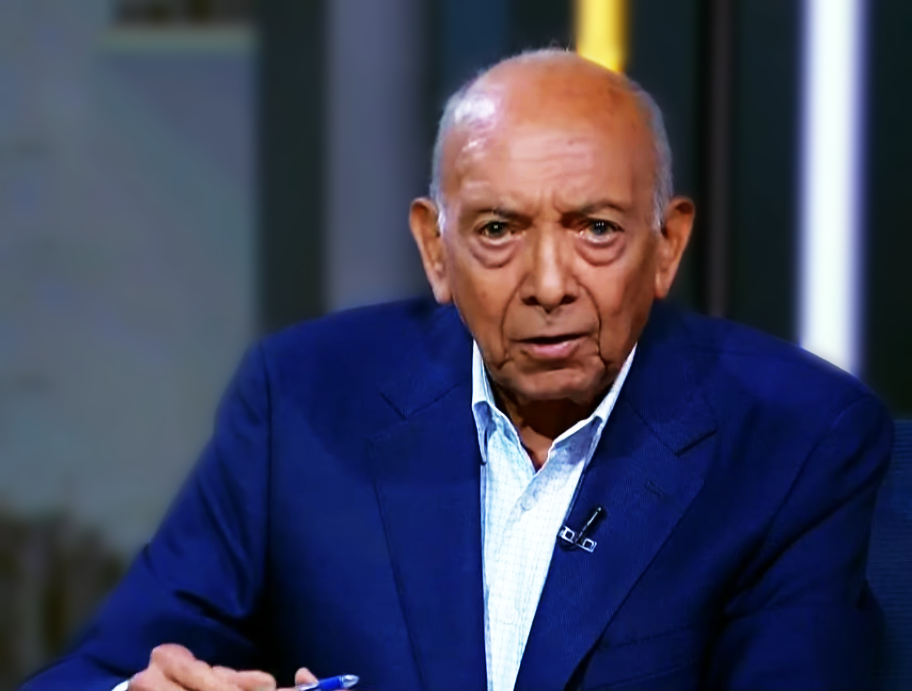
- Born: 17 March 1939 (age 87); Mansoura, Egypt
- Education: University of Cairo
- Known for: Founder of the Ghoneim Urology and Nephrology Center
- Scientific career
- Fields: Urology
- Workplaces: Mansoura University

Mohamed Ahmed Ghoneim is an Egyptian urologist.

== Career ==
Ghoneim is a graduate of the University of Cairo. He is one of the founders of the Ghoneim Urology and Nephrology Center for Management of Renal and Urological Disorders (a World Health Organization collaborating centre located in Mansoura, Egypt). He was a pioneer of kidney transplantation in Egypt. He is a member of the International Society of Urology, and a member of both the British and the American Urology Associations. He collaborated with Professor Nils Kock, the inventor of the Kock pouch. In reconstructive urology, he was among the developers of the urethral Kock pouch, an appliance-free, sphincter-controlled bladder substitute after radical cystectomy. He later co-developed, with Hassan Abol-Enein, the serous-lined extramural tunnel, an anti-reflux uretero-ileal reimplantation technique used in orthotopic ileal neobladders.

== Gaza War medical relief effort ==
Ghoniem provided medical services to war casualties in Gaza during the Gaza War.

== Honors and awards ==
Ghoneim served as annual president of the Endourology Society in 1987. Ghoneim is the recipient of the Egyptian National Scientific Award, 2001, and was a nominee for the European Urology Society annual award in 2004. He was the winner of the SIU-Félix Guyon Medal (2006). Ghoneim was awarded Hamdan Award for honoring distinguished personalities from the Arab World by Hamdan Medical Award in 2014.
