= Mansoura University =

Public university in Egypt

- جامعة المنصورة; Gāmaʿat al-Mansoura
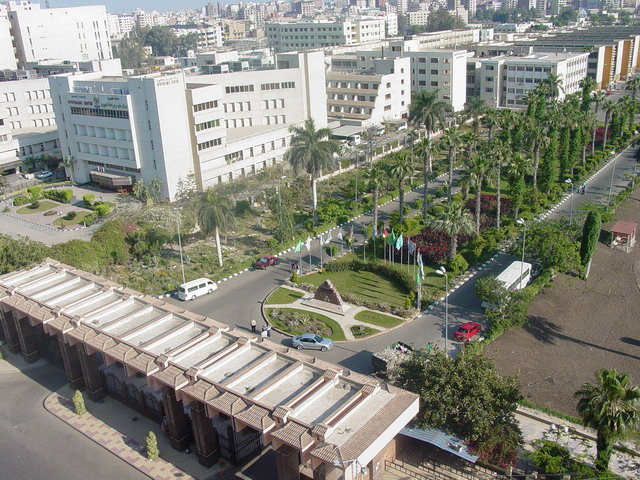
- Type: Public
- Established: 1972; 54 years ago
- President: Yousef Sherif Khater
- Location: Mansoura, Egypt
- Website: https://www.mans.edu.eg/en

Mansoura University was founded in 1972 in Mansoura city, Egypt. It is in the middle of the Nile Delta. It is one of the biggest Egyptian universities and has contributed much to the cultural and scientific life in Mansoura and Egypt.

== History ==
The faculty of medicine was founded in 1962 as a branch of Cairo University. In 1972, a presidential decree announced the establishment of the university under the name "East Delta University". Its name was changed to Mansoura University in 1973.

In 2018, the Mansourasaurus, a genus of herbivorous lithostrotian sauropod dinosaur, had been discovered by a team under Mansoura University paleontologist Hesham Sallam and was named after the university.

== Ranking ==
University rankings

Global – Overall
- ARWU World: 601–700 (2023)
- QS World: 1001–1200 (2024)
- THE World: 801–1000 (2024)
- USNWR Global: =447 (2023)

According to Times Higher Education (THE) (Edition: 2020), the ranking of Mansoura University is:

- World Ranking: 401–500
- Egyptian Ranking: 2

== Faculties and institutes ==
- The Faculty of Computers and Information Sciences
- The Faculty of Engineering
- The Faculty of Science
- The Faculty of Agriculture
- The Faculty of Arts
- The Faculty of Commerce
- The Faculty of Dental Medicine
- The Faculty of Law
- The Faculty of Medicine
- The Faculty of Pharmacy & Clinical Pharmacy
- The Faculty of Tourism and Hotels
- The Faculty of Veterinary Medicine
- The Faculty of Nursing
- The Faculty of Physical Education
- The Faculty of Kindergarten
- The Faculty of Specific Education
- Technical Institute of Nursing
- The Faculty of Media Literature
- The Faculty of Fine Arts

== Hospitals and medical centers ==
- Urology and Nephrology Center
- Specialized Medical Hospital
- Gastroenterology Surgical Center
- Mansoura University Hospitals
- Emergency Hospital
- Mansoura University Children's Hospital
- Oncology Center
- Ophthalmic Center
- Medical Experimental Research Center (MERC)

== Special centers and units ==
- Communication and Information Technology Center
- Water Sanitary Drainage and Industrial Projects Center
- Engineering Studies Research and Consultancies Center
- Technical Laboratory Scientific Services Center
- Information, Documentation and Decision Support Center
- Values Studies and Nationals Affiliation Center
- Managerial Training & Consulting Center
- Scientific Computing Center (SCC)
- Public Service Center
- Mansoura University Nanotechnology Center
- Mansoura University Staff Club
- English for Specific Purposes Center (ESPC)
- Childhood Care Development Center
- Arabic Language Learning Center for non-native speakers
- Elearning Unit (ELU)
- UNIVERSITY CENTERS FOR CAREER DEVELOPMENT
- Glass Research Group

== Notable alumni and faculty members ==
- Mohamed Ghoneim
- Kareem Mohamed Abu-Elmagd
- Hamdy Doweidar
- Ayman Nour
- Khairat el-Shater
- Mohamed Mansi Qandil
- Hesham Sallam

== See also ==
- List of Islamic educational institutions
- List of universities in Egypt
- Education in Egypt
