= Gold Cystoscope Award =

The Gold Cystoscope Award founded in 1936, revised in 1977, and named after the cystoscope, is awarded annually by the American Urological Association. The first recipient was Donald G. Skinner.

== List of awardees ==
- Ranjith Ramasamy 2023
- Angela Smith 2022
- Stacy Loeb 2021
- Edward J. McGuire 1982
- E. Darracott Vaughan 1981
- Stuart S. Howards 1979
- Carl A. Olsson 1978
- Patrick C. Walsh 1977
- Donald G. Skinner 1976
