= Memorial Regional Hospital (Florida) =

- Memorial Healthcare System

Geography
- Location: Hollywood, Florida, United States
- Coordinates: 26°01′10″N 80°10′56″W

Services
- Emergency department: Level I trauma center
- Beds: 797

Helipads
- Helipad: Aeronautical chart and airport information for 77FD at SkyVector

Links
- Website: www.mhs.net/locations/memorial-regional
- Lists: Hospitals in Florida

Memorial Regional Hospital is a 797-bed public hospital located in Hollywood, Florida. The hospital is the flagship hospital of Memorial Healthcare System.

== Services ==
Memorial Regional Hospital is home to a Level I trauma center, the Memorial Cardiac & Vascular Institute, the Memorial Cancer Institute, and the Memorial Neuroscience Institute. The hospital also features the Dr. Henry D. Perry Family Birthplace, a labor and delivery unit. Joe DiMaggio Children's Hospital is across the street and connected by skyway for transfers to its Level IV neonatal intensive care unit.
