= Inderbir Gill =

- Education: Government Medical College, Patiala
- Known for: Mumbai’s first robotic kidney transplantation

Inderbir Singh Gill is a professor of urology and robotic surgeon who is one of the pioneers of minimally invasive surgery. He currently resides in Los Angeles, California. In 2017, he led the team that performed Mumbai’s first robotic kidney transplantation. In 2025, Gill was part of the that team performed the worlds first human bladder transplant.

== Career ==
Gill is the chairman and Distinguished professor of the Catherine and Joseph Aresty Department of Urology, founding executive director of the USC Institute of Urology and associate dean for clinical innovation at the Keck School of Medicine at USC.

Prior to this, he was chairman & professor, department of urology at the Cleveland Clinic, Cleveland, OH, where he was on faculty for 12 years (1997-2009).

He moved to the United States from India in 1989 after completing his early medical training and residency in general surgery. He subsequently completed a two-year fellowship in kidney transplants and renal vascular surgery at the Cleveland Clinic. He completed urology residency at the University of Kentucky Medical Center in 1995. Between 1997 and 2009 he remained at the Cleveland Clinic and thereafter took up his current appointments at the University of Southern California.

== Selected publications ==
- Gill, Inderbir S. (2006). Textbook of Laparoscopic Urology. Taylor & Francis. ISBN 978-0-8493-3994-3.
