= Eliwourus =

Eliwourus Temporal range: Oligocene

Scientific classification
- Kingdom: Animalia
- Phylum: Chordata
- Class: Mammalia
- Infraclass: Placentalia
- Order: Rodentia
- Family: Anomaluridae
- Genus: †Eliwourus; Seiffert et al., 2024
- Species: †E. topernawiensis

Binomial name
- †Eliwourus topernawiensis Seiffert et al., 2024

Extinct genus of mammals

Eliwourus is an extinct genus of anomaluroid rodent that lived in Kenya during the Oligocene. A monotypic genus, it contains the species E. topernawiensis.
