= Kabirmys =

Kabirmys Temporal range: Late Eocene

Scientific classification
- Domain: Eukaryota
- Kingdom: Animalia
- Phylum: Chordata
- Class: Mammalia
- Order: Rodentia
- Family: Anomaluridae
- Genus: †Kabirmys; Sallam, Seiffert, Simons & Brindley, 2010
- Species: †K. qarunensis

Binomial name
- †Kabirmys qarunensis Sallam, Seiffert, Simons & Brindley, 2010

Extinct species of rodent

Kabirmys qarunensis is an extinct species of anomaluroid (scaly-tailed flying squirrel) rodent from the earliest late Eocene of the Birket Qarun Formation from northern Egypt. So far, it is the only known species in its genus. It was described in September 2010 by Hesham Sallam, Erik Seiffert, Elwyn Simons, and Chlöe Brindley based on isolated teeth, partial mandibles, and an edentulous partial maxilla. It is noteworthy for being the largest known Eocene anomaluroid.
