= Muljibhai Patel Urological Hospital =

Hospital in Gujarat, India

Coordinates: 22.6831°N 72.8722°E

Muljibhai Patel Urological Hospital is a hospital situated in Nadiad, established in 1978 in India.

In 2011, MPUH won the Indian Merchants' Chamber (IMC) Ramkrishna Bajaj National Quality Award Trophy.

It is one of the hospitals in Gujarat that does urological surgeries. It was also among the hospitals in India to use High Intensity Focused Ultrasound (HIFU) for the non-surgical treatment of prostate cancer.

The hospital is an ISO 9001:2008 certified hospital.
