= Clifford Paterson Lecture =

- Awarded for: Prize lecture
- Website: royalsociety.org/grants-schemes-awards/awards/clifford-paterson-lecture/

The Clifford Paterson Lecture is a prize lecture of the Royal Society now given biennially on an engineering topic. A £500 gift is given to the lecturer. The lectures, which honour Clifford Copland Paterson, founder-director of the GEC Wembley Research Laboratories 1918–1948, were instituted by the General Electric Company plc in 1975.

Not to be confused with the Clifford Paterson Medal and Prize awarded by the Institute of Physics.

== Clifford Paterson Lectures ==
Lecturers include:

- 1976 Eric Eastwood on Radar: new techniques and applications
- 1977 Gordon Rawcliffe on Induction motors: old and new
- 1978 Eric Ash on Recent advances in acoustic imaging
- 1979 Gordon George Scarrott on From slave to servant: the evolution of computing systems
- 1980 Derek Harry Roberts on Memory: its function, technology and impact
- 1981 Cyril Hilsum on Electronic displays: the link between man and microcircuit
- 1982 Michael Crowley-Milling on The worlds largest accelerator: the electron-positron collider, LEP
- 1983 John Edwin Midwinter on Optical fibre communications, present and future
- 1984 Alexander Lamb Cullen on Microwaves: the art and the science
- 1985 George William Gray on Liquid crystals: an arena for research and industrial collaboration among chemists, physicists and engineers
- 1986 Alec Nigel Broers on Fundamental limits to microstructure fabrication
- 1987 Gareth Gwyn Roberts on At home with science and technology
- 1988 Walter Thompson Welford on Microlithography and the ultraviolet: experiments with an excimer laser
- 1989 Alan Walter Rudge on The organization and management of R&D in a privatised British Telecom
- 1990 Maurice Wilkes on Progress and research in the computer industry
- 1991 David N. Payne on Circuits, sensors and strands of light
- 1992 Marcel Garnier on Magnetohydrodynamics in material processing
- 1993 I.R. Young on Accurate measurement in vivo magnetic resonance: an engineering problem?
- 1994 Michael Brady on Seeing machines and robots
- 1995 Frank Kelly on Modelling communication networks: present and future
- 1996 Martin Wood on Superconductivity: will the dream come true?
- 1997 Gareth Parry on From electrons and photons to optoelectronics and photonics
- 1998 Colin Webb on Making light work: applications of high power lasers
- 1999 Andy Hopper on Progress and research in the communications industry
- 2000 Eli Yablonovitch on Electronmagnetic bandgaps, at photonic and radio frequencies
- 2001 Allan Snyder on Light guiding light in the new millennium
- 2002 Roger Needham on Computer Security?
- 2003 Chris Toumazou on The bionic man
- 2004 Sandu Popescu on What is quantum non-locality?
- 2005 Wilson Sibbett on Optical science in the fast lane
- 2006 Richard Friend on Plastic fantastic; electronics for the 21st Century. The lecture can be view from the Video Library
- 2008 Martin Bodo Plenio, on Taming the Quanta
- 2009 Andrew DeMello on The Lilliput laboratory: chemistry & biology on the small scale
- 2010 David MacKay on Information theory meets writing
- 2011 S. Ravi P. Silva on Carbon electronics
- 2012 Molly Stevens on Regenerating organs and other small challenges
- 2014 Polina Bayvel on Fundamental research in high bandwidth digital communications and nonlinear optics
- 2016 Russell Cowburn for his remarkable academic, technical and commercial achievements in nano-magnetics
- 2018 Timothy Leighton for translation of his fundamental research into acoustics and its application in many areas ...
- 2020 Jacqui Cole for the development of photo-crystallography and the discovery of novel high-performance nonlinear optical materials and light-harvesting dyes using molecular design rules
- 2022 Anne Neville for her innovative research into corrosion and tribology and the successful application of this to wide-ranging, real life, engineering problems
- 2024 Mohan Edirisinghe for seminal research in engineering science of making small structures from soft matter in novel scalable ways, creating new frontiers in functional applications causing major advances in manufacturing and healthcare
- 2026 Philipp Kukura for pioneering and democratising mass photometry, a novel means of mass measurement for single biomolecules

== See also ==
- List of engineering awards
