= Andrew deMello =

British chemist (born 1970)

Andrew James deMello
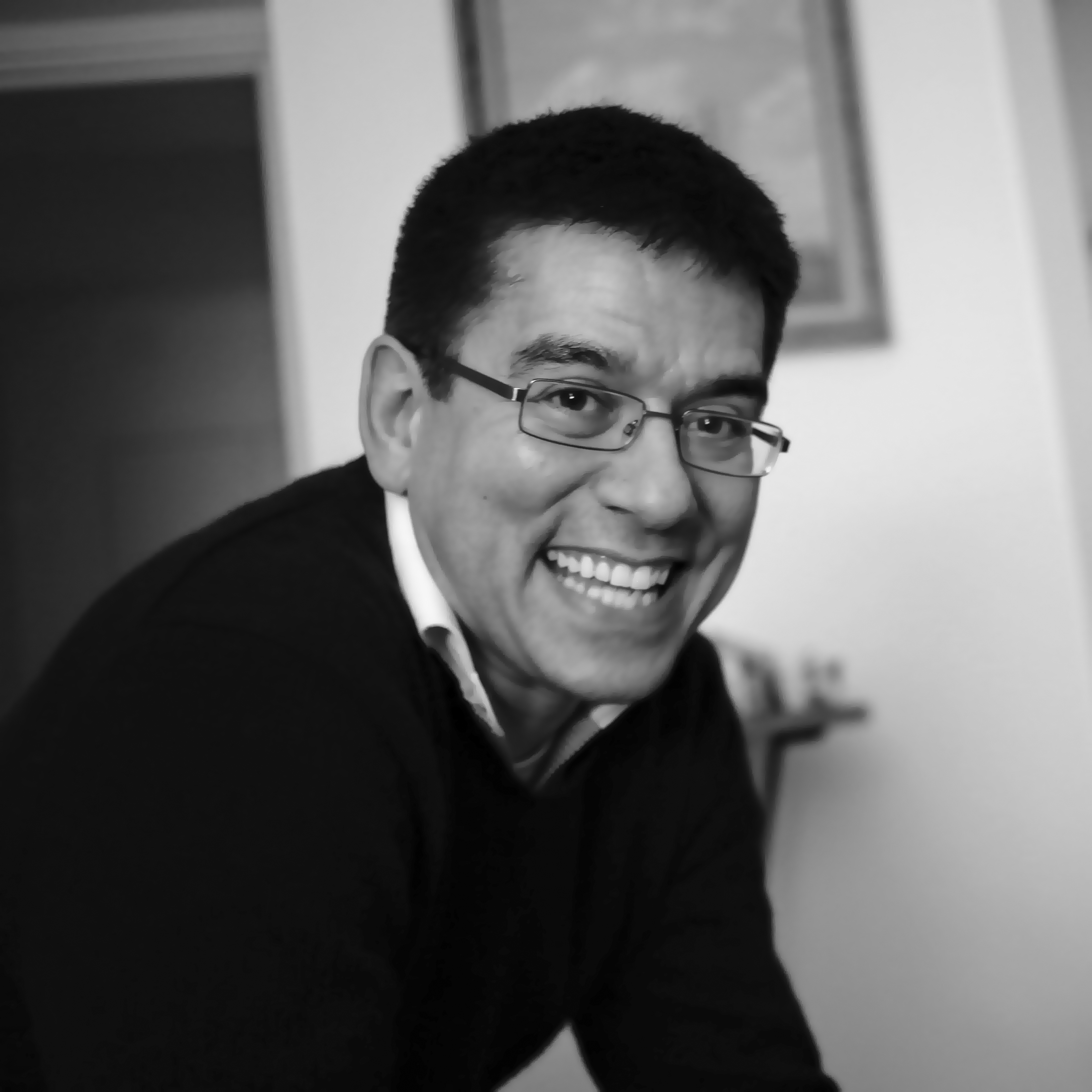
- Born: 1970 (age 55–56); Kingsbury, London, United Kingdom
- Education: Imperial College London
- Known for: Microfluidics, Nanotechnology, Bioanalytical Chemistry
- Awards: Fellowship of the Royal Society of Chemistry (2004); Corday Morgan Medal (2009); Clifford Paterson Medal & Lectureship (2009)
- Scientific career
- Fields: Microfluidics, Nanotechnology and Physical Chemistry
- Workplaces: University of California, Berkeley; Imperial College London; University of East Anglia; ETH Zurich
- Thesis: Evanescent wave spectroscopic studies at dielectric interfaces (1995)
- Doctoral advisor: Garry Rumbles
- Website: https://demellogroup.ethz.ch

Andrew James deMello (born 1970) is a British chemist and Professor of Biochemical Engineering at ETH Zürich (Swiss Federal Institute of Technology).

== Education ==
deMello was born in London, and spent his formative years in Harrow, attending the John Lyon School. He was awarded an entrance scholarship to Imperial College London in 1988, subsequently obtaining a first-class bachelor's degree in Chemistry in 1991 and a PhD in Molecular Photophysics in 1995 (for research supervised by Dr. Garry Rumbles).

== Career ==
On completion of his graduate studies, deMello took up a postdoctoral fellowship in the Department of Chemistry at the University of California at Berkeley. Working under the supervision of Richard A. Mathies, he began to develop microfluidic systems for biological analysis, and in 1995 co-authored the first report of system for rapid and integrated DNA analysis within a silicon/glass microfluidic chip. In 1996, he was appointed as a Lecturer (Assistant Professor) in Physical Chemistry at the University of East Anglia, and in 1997 moved back to his alma mater to take up the AstraZeneca Lectureship in Analytical Sciences at Imperial College London. In 2003, at the age of 33, deMello became Professor of Chemical Nanosciences and between 2007 and 2011 headed Nanostructured Materials & Devices Section within the Department of Chemistry. In 2011, he was appointed to the Chair of Biochemical Engineering within the Department of Chemistry and Applied Biosciences at ETH Zürich, and served as the Chair of the Institute for Chemical and Bioengineering from 2014 to 2016 and 2018 to 2020.

== Research contributions ==
deMello has made scientific contributions in diverse areas, but is best known for his work in the fields of microfluidics, nanotechnology, bioanalytical chemistry and Optical Spectroscopy, having published over 300 papers in the peer-reviewed literature. His group has pioneered the use of microfluidic systems for small molecule chemistry and nanomaterial synthesis, and in recent years has been at the forefront of developments in droplet-based microfluidics for ultra-high-throughput biological experimentation. A key theme of deMello's research has been the development of ultra-high sensitivity detection methods for use in microfluidic and nanofluidic environments. Highlights in this large body of work include the development of fluorescence lifetime imaging methods, the application of high sensitivity vibrational spectroscopies to small volume analysis and the development integrated optics for point-of-care diagnostic technologies. More recently, his group have introduced the technique of stroboscopic imaging flow cytometry, which allows for high resolution imaging of biological cells at throughputs in excess of 100,000 cells per second.

== Honours and awards ==
deMello is the recipient of the SAC Silver Medal (2002) and Corday Morgan Medal (2009) from the Royal Society of Chemistry. In 2009, deMello was awarded the Clifford Paterson Medal from the Royal Society of Great Britain in recognition of his achievements in the fields of nanotechnology and bioanalytical science, and in 2012 was awarded the Pioneers of Miniaturisation Award for his "outstanding achievements and significant contributions to the understanding and advancement of micro- and nano-scale science". He was elected a Fellow of the Royal Society of Chemistry in 2004 and was awarded the 2020 Advances in Measurement Science Lectureship by the American Chemical Society. He was the winner of Simon-Widmer Award and a speaker of Mendel Lectures in 2021.

== Personal life ==
deMello lives in Zürich with his wife Samantha and two children. His brother is experimental physicist John deMello, who is Professor of Nanomaterials in the Department of Chemistry at Norwegian University of Science and Technology.
