= Pender Chair =

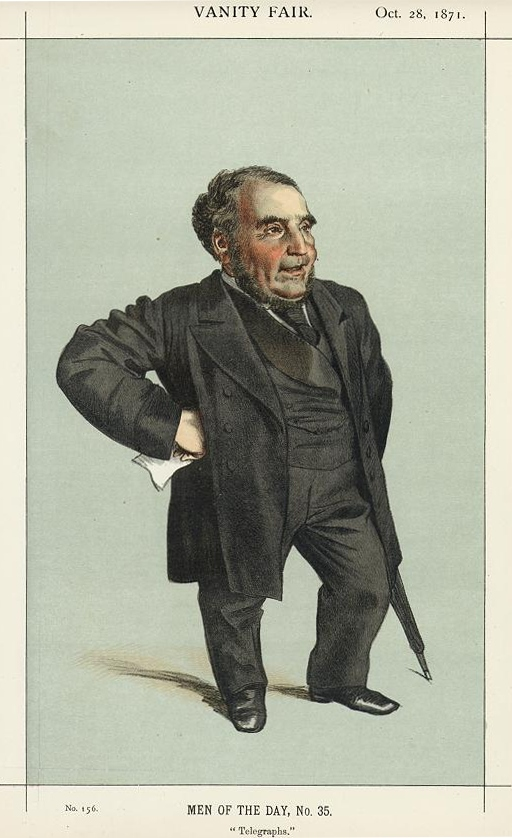
"Telegraphs" Pender as caricatured by James Tissot in Vanity Fair, October 1871

The Pender Chair is the post that is generally held by the head of the Department of Electronic and Electrical Engineering of University College London.

John Pender (pictured in the caricature on the right), the founder of Cable and Wireless, died in 1896. The Pender Memorial Committee was formed, and collected £6,277 in his memorial. Of this, they decided to donate £5,000 to the Department of Electrical Technology of University College, to enable an expansion of its facilities. This included the founding of the Pender Laboratory, and the inauguration of the Pender Chair.

The Department of Electrical Technology had already been formed some years earlier, in 1885, with John Ambrose Fleming (pictured below) as its head. He, therefore, became the first incumbent of the Pender Chair of Electrical Engineering.

The following references can be found, in the Council Minutes:

- 2 November 1895: Letter received from the Technical Education Board offering a grant of £1500 for the improvement of Engineering Teaching.
- 25 November 1895: Proposal to endow a Chair of Electrical Engineering as part of a memorial to the late Sir John Pender.
- 5 December 1896: Receipt of a Memorandum from the Pender Memorial Committee offering to put the sum of £5,000 in trust with UCL to fund a new Electrical Engineering Laboratory, to be named the Pender Laboratory, and to rename the existing chair of Electrical Engineering the Pender Chair of Electrical Engineering.
- 9 January 1897: Mr Swan nominated to represent the Council on the Pender Memorial Committee.

== Pender Professors of Electrical Engineering at UCL ==
- 1899-1925: John Ambrose Fleming
- 1926-1934: Wellesley Curram Clinton
- 1935–1945: Reginald Otto Kapp
- 1945-1950: G.T.R. Hill
- 1950-1966: Harold Barlow
- 1966-1979: Alexander Lamb Cullen
- 1979-1986: Eric Ash
- 1986-1987: David (DEN) Davies
- 1987-1991: vacant
- 1991-2002: John Edwin Midwinter
- 2002-2009: vacant
- 2009- now: Michael Pepper
