= Energy Exploration Technologies =

American lithium extraction company

EnergyX
- Type: Private
- Industry: Energy, Lithium mining, Battery Energy Storage
- Founded: 2018
- Founder: Teague Egan
- Headquarters: San Juan, Puerto Rico
- Key people: Teague Egan (CEO & Chairman); Kris Haber (Vice Chairman); Amit Patwardhan (EVP Tech)(EVP Tech)
- Products: direct lithium extraction (DLE) technology, solid state battery, Lithium
- Website: energyx.com

Energy Exploration Technologies, Inc. (more commonly known as EnergyX) is an American technology company. Founded in 2018 by Teague Egan, it is based out of San Juan, Puerto Rico and has offices and laboratory facilities in Austin, Texas, and operations in the South American Lithium Triangle (Bolivia, Chile and Argentina).

The company specializes in development, manufacturing and deployment of lithium mining technology, in particular LiTAS direct lithium extraction (DLE) technology and SoLiS solid state lithium metal batteries.

== Overview ==
EnergyX was established in 2018 by Teague Egan, son of Michael Egan, the founder and former majority owner of Alamo Rent a Car, who sold it for $625 million in 1996.

From the beginning, the startup company has been focused on lithium extraction and recovery technology. It started out as a R&D project based on the technology developed by the Research Center for Materials for Water and Energy Systems (M-WET) at the University of Texas in Austin and directed by the chemical engineer and professor Benny D. Freeman. In 2019, EnergyX acquired and licensed lithium extraction technology (LiTAS) from the University of Texas and further developed the procedural knowledge of direct lithium extraction (DLE) in its scientific center located in Austin, Texas.

In 2021, EnergyX secured $20 million from Obsidian Acquisition Partners, Helios Capital, as well as a variety of angel investors and institutional investors. The company raised nearly $5 million through crowdfunding.

Also in 2021, EnergyX was in a group of eight companies from the United States, Argentina, China, and Russia shortlisted by the Bolivian President Luis Arce's government for deployment of direct lithium extraction (DLE) technology at two mining sites in the country - Coipasa in Pastos Grandes and Uyuni salt flats. In December 2021, EnergyX deployed its first plant at Uyuni salt flats. However, by June 2022 EnergyX had been disqualified as a contender for Bolivia's lithium resources.

In 2023, the company raised $50 million in a Series B funding round, led by General Motors, who gained rights to a percentage of their production.

In 2024, they raised $75 million through a retail investment crowdfunding round, which was done under Regulation A, a special United States Securities and Exchange Commission rule which allows companies to raise up to $75 million from retail investors yearly, given that the company satisfies certain additional rules, which include issuing semi-annual reports. Egan stated that he chose the retail raise because it allowed him to keep a larger percentage ownership (he currently owns 47%) than raising money from venture capitalists, who generally would get better ownership terms than retail investors.

== Technology ==
The company develops direct lithium extraction (DLE) technology based on proprietary LiTAS method. The method includes filtering of the brine that contains lithium through a series of selective membranes, separating various types of salts, such as magnesium, sodium, potassium, sulfate and other chemicals from lithium.

According to The Chemical Engineer: "In the last years, the company moved from the metal-organic framework system (MOF) originally developed at the University of Texas to non-MOF membranes technology developed by the company's scientific labs. The first step in EnergyX’s process uses its Lithium-Ion Transport and Separation (LiTAS) electrodialysis technology. LiTAS uses a proprietary ion-exchange membrane to separate out the dissolved lithium ions from the brine solution, which results in lithium being separated from undesired species such as magnesium in the solution. The second step then involves bipolar electrodialysis which splits a salt into its acid and base components. In the case of lithium chloride, it splits into lithium hydroxide and hydrochloric acid."

The lithium separation technology is assembled into processing units, which, in turn, are integrated in large housing containers. The containers are modular, scalable, and transportable and can be used as complementary extracting technology to the traditional mining infrastructure.

As of 2024, some in the field are skeptical of their claims, with the founder of another lithium-exploration company stating: "...they are certainly the types of claims that other companies would not put out without publicly available documented engineering and scoping studies.” When another lithium consultant made a social media post stating that EnergyX's popularity had more to do with their marketing than their technology, they sent him a cease-and-desist letter after which he removed the post.

== Operations and offices ==
EnergyX is headquartered in San Juan, Puerto Rico and has R&D laboratories and pilot facilities in Austin, Texas. In addition, the company has operations in the Lithium Triangle area of Bolivia, Chile and Argentina.

In 2023, EnergyX announced that it had acquired a lease which allows it to explore a 90,000 acre plot in Chile. The company also unveiled plans for domestic lithium production in the Smackover Formation where the states of Arkansas, Louisiana, and Texas intersect. In 2025, EnergyX purchased Daytona Lithium for $4 million in cash and $22 million in stock options from Pantera Lithium Limited (an Australian lithium brine company who had itself acquired the subsidiary in 2023). The acquisition gave EnergyX more than 35,000 acres in the Smackover, bringing its total holdings in the Smackover to 47,500 acres.

In 2026, EnergyX added the production of nuclear-grade critical materials to its portfolio, saying it intends to provide lithium isotopes and high-purity lithium compounds for nuclear powerplants.

== See also ==
- Lithium production
- Rare-earth metals
- Lithium
