= John Lyon School =

Public school in Harrow-on-the Hill, Greater London

- Redesigned logo first used from 2016

Location
- Middle Road; Harrow on the Hill, Greater London, HA2 0HN; England; 51.5709°N 0.3438°W

Information
- Type: Private day school
- Motto: Latin: Stet Fortuna Domus ("May the fortune of the house stand")
- Religious affiliation: Non-denominational
- Established: 1876
- Founders: The Governors of Harrow School
- Local authority: London Borough of Harrow
- Department for Education URN: 102247 Tables
- Chair of Governors: Neil Enright
- Head: Rose Hardy
- Deputy Head of Prep: Laurence Seguier
- Staff: 150 (approx.)
- Gender: Unisex
- Age: 2 to 18
- Enrolment: 860 (approx.)
- Houses: Boleyn; Halliday; Byron; Quainton
- Colours: Blue, gold
- Publication: The Lyonian (issued termly)
- Alumni: Old Lyonians
- Badges: Rampant lion
- Website: https://www.johnlyon.org/

John Lyon School (prior to 1965, The Lower School of John Lyon) is an academically selective private co-educational day school for pupils aged 2 to 18 in Harrow-on-the-Hill, Greater London, England.

The school was founded in 1876, by the Governors of Harrow School for the education of local boys, in belated keeping with the wishes of John Lyon, Harrow School's founder. On the school's Founders Day each year, John Lyon School maintains an observance commemorating the founder John Lyon at St Mary's Church. John Lyon School maintains historic ties with Harrow School, and the two schools are closely partnered being part of the 'Harrow Family of Schools'. Until September 2021, John Lyon was a boys' school, thereafter becoming a mixed school for new pupils aged 11. The school is a member of the Headmasters' and Headmistresses' Conference (HMC). As of 2026-2027, the school charges termly fees inclusive of VAT of £4,456 for Nursery, £6,385 for Reception to Year 2, £7,265 for Years 3 to 6 and £10,076 for Year 7 to Upper Sixth. Several academic scholarships are available to help reduce these fees for some students.

Until 2020, John Lyon was an 11 to 18 senior independent HMC boys' day school in Harrow-on-the-Hill. In 2020, John Lyon amalgamated with what was then called Quainton Hall Prep, located in central Harrow, to become an all-through School. The school became co-educational in September 2021. From January 2024, Quainton Hall Preparatory School was rebranded as a constituent part of the John Lyon School.

Historic John Lyon school emblem, employed before 2016.

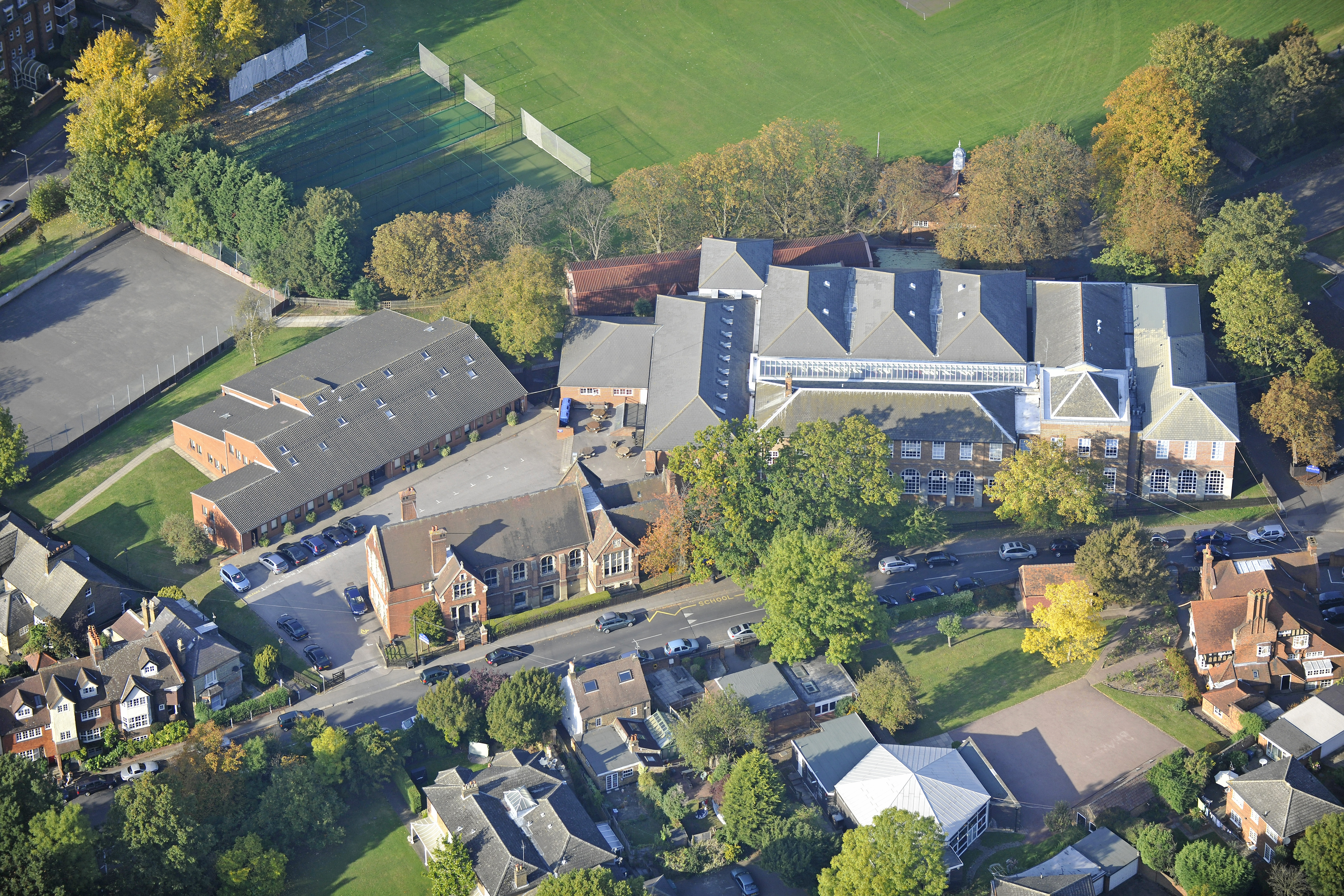
John Lyon's Senior School campus on Middle Road, Harrow-on-the-Hill

== Structure and curriculum ==
The governing body of Harrow School retains some control of the John Lyon School; most responsibilities, however, are delegated to a John Lyon board of governors (officially styled Committee of Management). A number of Harrow governors serve on this committee, alongside co-opted governors. Unlike many previous governing bodies in British schools, there is no academic staff involvement in overall school government.

== Notable alumni ==
- Francis Bennion, jurist
- Michael Bogdanov, theatre director
- Andrew deMello, scientist and academic
- Andrew Carwood, conductor and singer, director of Music, St Paul's Cathedral, London
- Alfred Dunhill, tobacconist and inventor, founder of the Dunhill luxury goods company
- David Fell, cricketer
- Alastair Fraser, cricketer and a director of the Middlesex Cricket Board
- David Gavurin, musician
- Gary Gibbon, political editor at Channel 4
- Ben Gill, former footballer
- Michael Gold, TV documentary producer
- Roger Griffin, professor of modern history and political theorist at Oxford Brookes University
- Liam Halligan, broadcaster and economist
- Johann Hari, journalist
- Kenneth Hudson, industrial archeologist and museologist
- Anthony Jeffrey, former Arsenal FC Academy footballer
- Vladimir V. Kara-Murza, Russian politician and journalist
- Michael McCarthy, director of Music, U.S. National Cathedral, Washington, USA
- Inder Manocha, comedian
- Peter Marychurch, former Director of the British signals intelligence agency, GCHQ
- Alastair Miles, operatic and concert bass
- Brian Pearce, Marxist political activist, historian and translator
- Stephen Pollard, journalist and Editor of The Jewish Chronicle newspaper
- David Punter, academic and writer
- Julian Rhind-Tutt, actor
- Gordon Douglas Rowley, botanist and writer
- Raymond Sawkins, novelist, writing as Colin Forbes
- Michael Shersby, former Conservative MP for Uxbridge
- Victor Silvester, former band leader
- Kabir Toor, former Middlesex cricketer
- Michael Turner, artist
- John Wardley, attraction and special effects developer
- Timothy West, actor
- Paul Wilkinson, academic

== Notable staff and governors ==
- Liam Halligan (Governor), Economic and Politics Broadcaster
- Neil Enright (Chair of Governors), Headmaster or Queen Elizabeth's School
- Chris Peploe (cricket coach), Middlesex cricketer
- Ian Blanchett (former cricket coach), Middlesex cricketer
- Lord Lexden (former governor), official historian of the Conservative Party
- Angus Fraser (former Governor / cricket coach), England International cricketer
- Owain Arwel Hughes (former Chair of Governors), conductor
- Albert Alan Owen (former music teacher), composer
- George Weedon (former PE teacher), Olympic gymnast
- Ian Whybrow (former Head of English), children's author

The Old Lyonian Association represents the school's alumni (Old Lyonians).
