= FSRS =

FSRS may refer to:

- Football Association of Republika Srpska
- Forest Service Road System
- Free Spaced Repetition Scheduler
- Femtosecond Stimulated Raman Spectroscopy
