= BATC =

The acronym BATC may refer to:

- Best Available Technology Conclusions, used in e.g. EU IED enforcement
- British Amateur Television Club
- BIAC, (formerly the) Brussels Airport Terminal Company
- BATC (Ball Aerospace and Technology Corp.) Broomfield and Boulder, Co.
- Bridgerland Technical College (formerly known as Bridgerland Applied Technology College)
