= Hirst Research Centre =

English research centre

Coordinates: 51.564°N 0.302°W

The Hirst Research Centre, also known as the GEC Hirst Research Centre or GEC Research Laboratories, was established in 1919 at Wembley, Middlesex, by the General Electric Company.

== History ==
Formally opened in 1923, the site at East Lane, Wembley was one of the first specialised industrial research laboratories to be built in Britain. The centre was named after Hugo Hirst, one of the founders of the company that would become the General Electric Company.

One of the centre's most famous achievements was the development of the cavity magnetron during World War II, the concept of which was established by Randall and Boot working at Birmingham University. Specifically, GEC engineers were able to dramatically increase the power output, reaching in excess of 100 kW by 1941 and close to one megawatt by 1943. These high power pulses, generated from a relatively compact device and transmitted from an antenna only centimeters long, substantially reduced the size of practical radar systems by orders of magnitude, permitting their installation in fighter aircraft.

The 60 m radio mast at the back of the building became, along with Wembley Stadium, one of the landmarks of the area. Hirst was instrumental in setting up the National Grid system which provides power to the whole of the UK. The centre also worked on the design of electrical power systems for the British railway network.

Throughout the Cold War, the centre undertook a wide range of Ministry of Defence (MoD) and commercial projects. Since at least 1977, it had been designated as a "prohibited place" under Section 3(b) of the Official Secrets Act 1911 because it held classified material for the purpose of fulfilling MoD contracts relating to a wide range of military equipment, including the Rapier missile.

In the 1990s, the organisation relocated to Borehamwood, Hertfordshire. After GEC vacated the Wembley site, it was used as the set for some scenes of the 1995 film The Young Poisoner's Handbook.

== Notable employees and scientists ==
- Clifford Paterson - the organisation's first director, held that position until his death in 1948.
- Derek Abbott - studied CCD and microchip design for imaging systems. Became a fellow of the Institute of Electrical and Electronics Engineers in 2005 "for contributions to analysis of noise and stochastic phenomena in vision systems", and received an Australian Laureate Fellowship in 2024 for ultrasensitive Terahertz radiation detection.
- Jean Bacon - computing specialist. Later became the first woman to join the Computer Laboratory at the University of Cambridge, designing distributed systems and middleware.
- David Bevan - devised weighted reference counting, an approach to computer memory management suitable for distributed systems.
- Colin Cherry - later occupied the Chair of Telecommunications at Imperial College London.
- Eric Megaw - group head on early development of the cavity magnetron.
- Robert James Clayton - defence and industrial electronics researcher.
- Paul Hendricks - later appointed Titular Bishop of Rosemarkie.
- Cyril Hilsum - chief scientist. Later codeveloped the Ridley-Watkins-Hilsum theory that provided the theoretical basis of the transferred electron device, also known as the Gunn diode; his research also helped form the basis of modern LCD displays.
- Daryl E. Hooper - laboratory head. Published a key text on transistor amplifier design.
- Daniel McCaughan - electronics researcher. Later chief scientist at Nortel Technology.
- Sanjay Jha - later chief executive officer of GlobalFoundries and Motorola Mobility.
- Bernard de Neumann
- Michael Pepper - semiconductor researcher, set up joint Cambridge-GEC projects. Later formed the Semiconductor Physics research group at the Cavendish Laboratory.
- Derek Roberts - director, specialised in semiconductor research.
- Bruce Robertson - group leader, studying fiber optics, semiconductor production, sensors, and robotics. Later co-founded Kingfisher International, an Australian fiber optic test equipment manufacturer.
- Michael John Smith - worked as a quality audit manager. In 1992, Smith was arrested, accused of spying for the KGB, and convicted on the three section 1(1)(c) charges of the UK Official Secrets Act 1911.
- Boris Townsend - senior research engineer, worked on various secret projects during the Second World War, including torpedo guidance systems and radar, including the first airborne radar system. Specialised in television engineering, designed the first colour television to be mass-produced in the UK.
- Ian Robert Young - medical physicist specialising in of magnetic resonance imaging (MRI), later became Chief Scientist of the NMR division of Picker International upon its creation, president of the Society of Magnetic Resonance in Medicine, and authored over 100 papers on MRI.

== See also ==
- Marconi Research Centre
- GEC-Marconi scientist deaths conspiracy theory
