= Mohan Edirisinghe =

Sri Lankan bioengineer and academic

Mohan Jayantha Edirisinghe
- Born: Sri Lanka
- Education: University of Leeds; University of Moratuwa; St Thomas College, Mount Lavinia
- Scientific career
- Workplaces: University College London
- Theses: DSc thesis, a collection of Edirisinghe research papers (2000); Alloy additions and their effect on the structure and properties of cast iron (1983)
- Website: https://www.edirisinghelab.com/

Mohan Jayantha Edirisinghe is a Sri Lankan biomaterials engineer who is the Bonfield Chair of Biomaterials in the Department of Mechanical Engineering at University College London. Edirisinghe studies new materials forming methodologies, with a focus on the development of new biostructures. He was appointed an Order of the British Empire in the 2021 New Year Honours for his services to Biomedical Engineering. As of July 2026, Professor Edirisinghe has an h-index of 82 according to Google Scholar.

== Early life and education ==
Edirisinghe was born in Sri Lanka. He was educated at the St Thomas College, Mount Lavinia. He studied at the University of Moratuwa in the Department of Materials Science and Engineering, in a joint course between the British Council and University of Leeds. He eventually moved to Leeds for his postgraduate studies, where he completed a doctorate on alloy additions and how they impact the properties of cast iron and then a Doctor of Science degree was awarded for his materials research in 2000 by the University of Leeds.

== Research and career ==
Edirisinghe works on materials forming and manufacturing for healthcare and drug delivery. He has developed complex nanofibres that can be used to generate antimicrobial filters, and nanobubbles that facilitate new modes of drug delivery. He developed electrohydrodyanmic printing methods (e.g. electro-spinning and electro-spraying) for biomedical applications. In 2010, Edirisinghe's inventions led to AtoCap, a spin-out company who focus on the encapsulation of generic drugs (e.g. antibiotics and chemotherapeutics) into a complex capsule. He has studied the protein composition of milk, and identified that casein, which contributes 80% of the protein in dairy milk, has anti-microbial and anti-inflammatory properties. Edirisinghe demonstrated that it could be incorporated into biodegradable plastic bandages to accelerate wound healing.

During the early days of the COVID-19 pandemic, Edirisinghe worked with the Royal Academy of Engineering to create new respirator masks. His antiviral masks were developed and also worked on air filters that could be used in care homes, schools and on public transport.

== Awards and honours ==
- 2005 Royal Society Brian Mercer (Innovation) Feasibility Award
- 2009 IOM3 Kroll Medal
- 2010 Materials Science Venture Prize
- 2012 UK Biomaterials Society Presidents Prize
- 2013 Royal Society Brian Mercer (Innovation) Feasibility Award
- 2015 Elected Fellow of the Royal Academy of Engineering
- 2017 Royal Academy of Engineering Armourers & Brasier's Prize
- 2017 Royal Society Brian Mercer (Innovation) Feasibility Award
- 2017 IOM3 Chapman Medal
- 2020 Elected Fellow of the European Academy of Sciences
- 2021 Appointed an OBE in the New Year Honours for services to Biomedical Engineering
- 2023 Royal Academy of Engineering Colin Campbell Mitchell Award
- 2024 Royal Society Clifford Paterson Medal and Lecture
- 2026 UCLMechEng Citizen Award, recognising an individual whose exceptional contributions have had a transformative impact on the department

== Selected publications ==
- C J Luo; Stoyanov, Simeon; Stride, Eleanor; E Pelan; M Edirisinghe (2012). "Electrospinning versus fibre production methods: from specifics to technological convergence". Chemical Society Reviews. 41 (13): 4708–4735. doi:10.1039/c2cs35083a. PMID 22618026. Wikidata Q38012344.
- Luo, C.J.; Nangrejo, M.; Edirisinghe, M. (2010). "A novel method of selecting solvents for polymer electrospinning". Polymer. 51 (7): 1654–1662. doi:10.1016/j.polymer.2010.01.031.
- C. J. Luo; Stride, Eleanor; M. Edirisinghe (2012). "Mapping the Influence of Solubility and Dielectric Constant on Electrospinning Polycaprolactone Solutions". Macromolecules. 45 (11): 4669–4680. doi:10.1021/ma300656u. Wikidata Q60455447.
- Stride, Eleanor; Mohan Edirisinghe (2008). "Novel microbubble preparation technologies". Soft Matter. 4 (12): 2350. doi:10.1039/b809517p. Wikidata Q60455578.
- J Huang; S M Best; W Bonfield; R A Brooks; N Rushton; Suwan N. Jayasinghe; M J Edirisinghe (2004). "In vitro assessment of the biological response to nano-sized hydroxyapatite". Journal of Materials Science: Materials in Medicine. 15 (4): 441–445. doi:10.1023/b:jmsm.0000021117.67205.cf. PMID 15332614. Wikidata Q45033303.
