= Boris Townsend =

English physicist and television engineer (1919–2006)

Boris Townsend MBE
- Townsend in 1984
- Born: George Boris Townsend; 13 April 1919; London, England
- Died: 12 April 2006 (aged 86); Lytham, Lancashire, England
- Education: BSc, physics, King's College, 1940; PhD, University of London, 1965
- Spouse: Mary Helen McMillan
- Children: 3
- Engineering career
- Awards: MBE, AKC, CEng, FInstP, FIEE, AMBIM, FRTS, FBKS

George Boris Townsend MBE (13 April 1919 – 12 April 2006) was an English physicist who specialised in television engineering. He published a number of books and papers on television engineering.

== Early years ==
Townsend was born in London during 1919. At school his hard work and good results won him a scholarship from an LCC Primary School to a Grammar School, where he became Captain of Athletics as well as School Captain. As a small schoolboy, he was televised by John Logie Baird although he had to stand on a box to bring his face up to the scanning disc. Baird was at the time (1925) holding his first public demonstration of television at Selfridges department store on Oxford Street in London, a short distance from where Townsend lived. Baird was demonstrating his 30-line system at 5 frames per second, and was only able to generate silhouettes. It was nonetheless fitting that the 6 year old Townsend happened to be shopping with his mother and come across the very start of television at the start of his own life. He was awarded the Sambrooke Scholarship to King’s College, University of London, where he read physics, and continued to develop his passion for playing rugby. His rugby career culminated in him playing for the (now famous) London based Saracens FC. Townsend’s main studies were in atomic physics and Maxwell’s electro-magnetic theory. In 1940, he graduated from King’s College with a first class honours degree in Physics and a diploma in Divinity. Townsend would eventually earn a Ph.D from the University of London.

== Professional life ==
At the age of 21, Townsend joined the British General Electric Co. Ltd at their Hirst Research Laboratories in Wembley, London, and soon became one of the senior research engineers. For the remainder of the Second World War, he worked on various secret projects including torpedo guidance systems and radar. Most notably he was the senior engineer of the team that created the first airborne radar system, which for the first time allowed Allied aircraft to find and track enemy planes both at night and in cloudy conditions.

With the end of the war in 1945, he started work on television transmission and reception just before the television service reopened. During the second world war, the UK government had shut down the television service to concentrate on the war effort. The valves (vacuum tubes) developed by Townsend and his team at the GEC Research Laboratories for radar, were later used in the creation of their colour television design. While working for GEC, on 31 October 1958 he filed a patent application for specific elements of his television design which was later granted (No. 875,876). Townsend had a number of other patents filed under his own name including the Automatic Saturation Control for Colour-Television Receiver and a Compensator for colour-television receivers for chromaticity variations in ambient light.

In 1961, after 20 years in the research laboratories of the GEC, he set up and became manager of the television department of GEC (Electronics) Ltd, making professional colour television monitors. It was here that he designed the first colour television to be mass-produced in the UK. Part of his team's accomplishments was the setting up of a complete colour studio in the New Horticultural Halls in the Victoria district of London. It was from here they broadcast the first public demonstration in the UK of a live colour television studio production titled "The New TV Show" on 19 August 1961.

He moved to Rank Cintel Television at Sydenham in 1963, first as technical manager, where he was concerned with the development and manufacture of telecine machines and video tape equipment along with other professional studio equipment, then as manager. Townsend obtained his doctorate from the Faculty of Science at the University of London in 1965 for his thesis on colour television. A year later he joined ABC in March 1966 and later that year was made a fellow of the Royal Television Society (RTS). As colour television became more widespread, he was instrumental in establishing the new techniques required for making film with the correct characteristics suitable for colour television transmission.

After several years at ABC Television – which became Thames Television – as head of engineering research, Townsend joined the Independent Broadcasting Authority headquarters staff in 1972, where he became head of engineering information service.

...a judicious combination of human imperfections and clever technical solutions

— George Boris Townsend, about colour television, quoted by Aleksandar Todorovic

Townsend was well known for his ability to convey complex technical principles in a clear and interesting manner, frequently including an entertaining anecdote. He was widely considered to be a leading expert in his field and was on occasion called as an expert witness in court cases such as a patent action in the 1970s for EMI.

Townsend was regularly quoted in the media about how he saw the development of television progressing, with what turned out to be with great accuracy. The New Scientist on 9 March reported him predicting that we would see dedicated communication satellites being used for broadcasting television pictures over multiple countries from one satellite, with different sound tracks available simultaneously in different languages. He also predicted that the same satellites would be used by foreign news reports to send live reports direct to our homes.

Townsend claimed to have tried his hand at most jobs in television, from acting in front of the cameras to designing and making most types of equipment. He has served on numerous national and international committees, including the European Broadcasting Union (EBU) committee concerned with the choice of standards for the European colour television system.

== Works ==
Townsend presented a paper titled "The Physiology and Psychology of Colour" at the BBC International Television Design Conference on 8 November 1968 at the Television Centre, White City, London. It has since appeared as an article in the British Journal of Photography and was published by the British Board of Television Advertising (BBTA) in 1969. The BBTA commissioned him to write two further papers on Colour Television Reproduction, Colour Telecines and Standardisation, Technical standards of colour film for television advertising.

While at GEC, Townsend and his team built up a great deal of knowledge of the NTSC television system. This knowledge produced Townsend's most noticeable books on colour television engineering. His first book, published in 1961, was Colour Television: N.T.S.C. System, Principles and Practice, and covered the basic principles and the NTSC system. The second book, Colour Television (1969), in collaboration with his GEC colleague Peter Carnt, covered PAL, SECAM and other systems. Townsend's first two books on colour television engineering quickly became some of the definitive reference books in their field, often cited as references in other publications, and even in patent disputes.

== Lectures ==
Townsend presented the prestigious RTS Fleming Memorial Lecture titled "A Television Service Fit for Artists" on his birthday 13 April 1972. This led to him giving a number of prestigious lectures including the Sylvanus P. Thompson event for the IEE. Townsend's superb presentation skills were put to good use in "The Entertaining Electron" lecture which he presented with his colleague Howard Steele. They toured the UK in 1975 and 1976, presenting elaborately staged series of IEE Faraday Lectures, which attracted large audiences.

== Later years ==
After his retirement from the IBA in 1984, Townsend worked as a senior consultant on television engineering projects around the world, through John Tucker Associates on Craven Street, London.

== Awards and honours ==
Townsend was awarded an MBE in the Queen's Birthday Honours List of 1982 for his contribution to television engineering.

== Affiliations and memberships ==
Townsend was a Fellow of the Institute of Physics, Institution of Electrical Engineers, Royal Television Society, British Kinematograph, Sound and Television Society, and the Society of Motion Picture and Television Engineers. He served as Chairman of the Royal Television Society for a number of years and was President of the British Amateur Television Club from 1960 to 1964.
