= Kabir Toor =

English cricketer (born 1990)

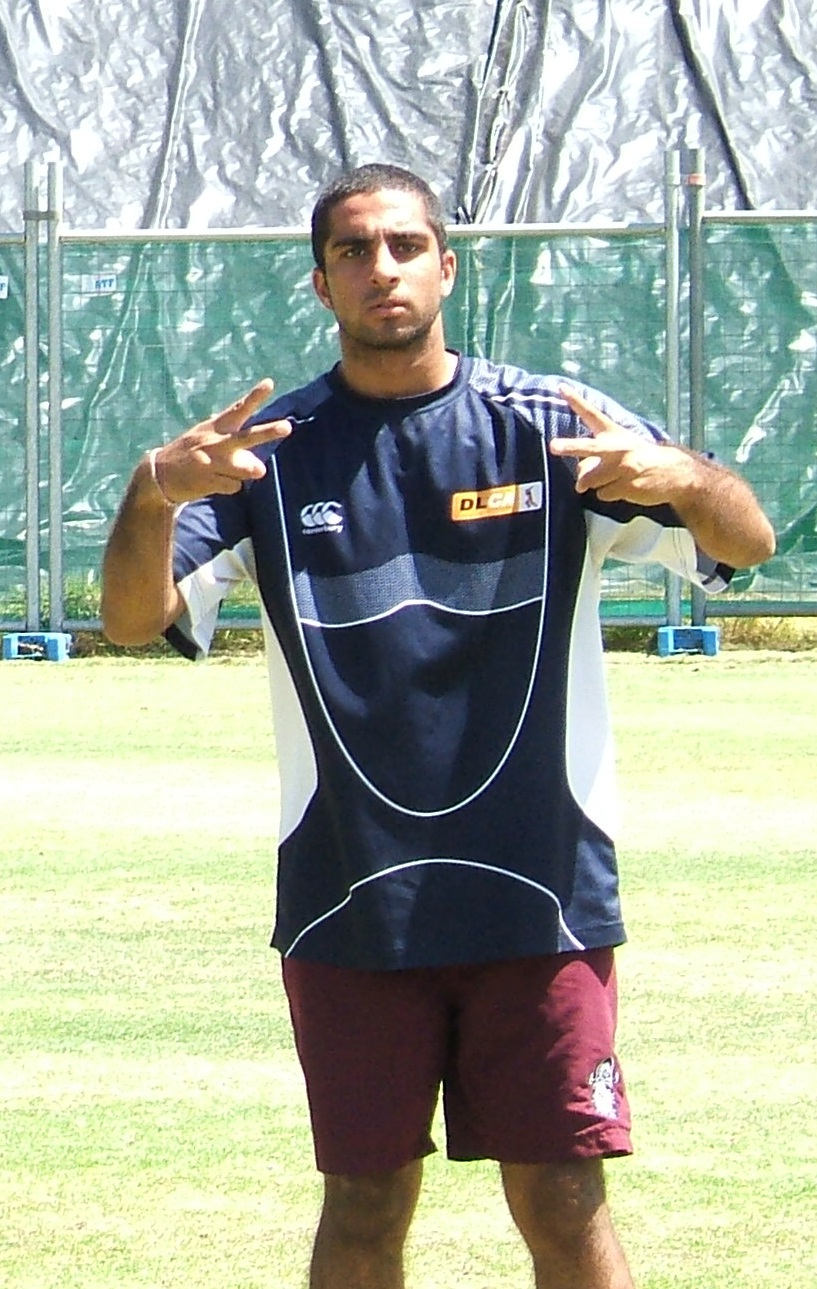

Personal information
- Full name: Kabir Singh Toor
- Born: 30 April 1990 (age 36); Watford, Hertfordshire, England
- Height: 5 ft 10 in (1.78 m)
- Batting: Right-handed
- Bowling: Right arm leg break
- Role: Batting all-rounder

Domestic team information
- Years: Team
- 2009–2010: Middlesex (squad no. 18)
- Only First-class: 25 May 2010; Middlesex v Oxford MCCU
- List A debut: 13 September 2009; Middlesex v Derbyshire
- Last List A: 19 September 2009; Middlesex v Northamptonshire

Career statistics
Competition	FC	LA
Matches	1	2
Runs scored	15	8
Batting average	15.00	8.00
100s/50s	0/0	0/0
Top score	15	5
Balls bowled	150	24
Wickets	1	1
Bowling average	84.00	32.00
5 wickets in innings	0	0
10 wickets in match	0	0
Best bowling	1/36	1/25
Catches/stumpings	0/–	0/–
- Source: ESPNcricinfo, 20 August 2019

Kabir Singh Toor (born 20 April 1990 in Watford, Hertfordshire) is an English cricketer who played for Middlesex.

Toor was educated at the St. John's Preparatory School in Northwood before he moved on to the John Lyon School, Harrow and attended the Middlesex Cricket Academy. He represented Middlesex, South England and England at all major levels until 18. After a strong pre-season performance during the tour to Dubai in 2009, he went on to make his professional debut in a Pro40 match in September of that year.
