= Francis Bennion =

English barrister

Francis Alan Roscoe Bennion (2 January 1923 – 28 January 2015) was a barrister in the United Kingdom. He was the author of several leading UK legal texts, including in particular Bennion on Statutory Interpretation (first edition in 1984; 5th edition in 2008).

Bennion was born at Wallasey in Cheshire, the only son of Thomas Roscoe Bennion and his wife Ellen Norah Bennion. He was educated at The John Lyon School in Harrow, London from 1934 to 1939, and attended one year St Andrews University in 1941 before joining the Royal Air Force Volunteer Reserve. He served in the Second World War as a Coastal Command pilot in No. 221 Squadron RAF from 1941 to 1946.

After his war service, he returned to study law at Balliol College, Oxford in 1946. He was called to the Bar at Middle Temple in January 1951, and practised as a barrister in England from 1951 to 1965, including eight years as Parliamentary Counsel from 1953 to 1965, when he drafted constitutions for Pakistan and for Ghana following independence from the UK.

He left his practice at the bar from 1965 to 1973, spending three years as the Chief Executive of the Royal Institution of Chartered Surveyors; then, after being a co-founder of the Professional Association of Teachers in 1968, he was its first chairman from 1968 to 1972.

In 1972, Bennion brought a private prosecution against the young Peter Hain for criminal conspiracy, in relation to Hain's activities as chairman of the Stop the Seventy Tour Campaign which took direct action to disrupt sporting events involving participants from South Africa in 1969 and 1970, as a protest against the apartheid regime. During the ten-day trial at the Old Bailey Hain dismissed his defence team, which included barrister Geoffrey Robertson, before being convicted and fined £200.

Bennion returned to legal practice as a barrister in 1973. He was Parliamentary Counsel again from 1973 to 1975, drafting various Acts of Parliament, including the Consumer Credit Act 1974 and the Sex Discrimination Act 1975. He continued to practise at the bar until 1994.

He became a lecturer in law at the University of Oxford in 1984, remaining there until his retirement in 2002.
