= Polina Bayvel =

Ukrainian-British engineer (born 1966)

Dame Polina Bayvel DBE FRS FREng FInstP
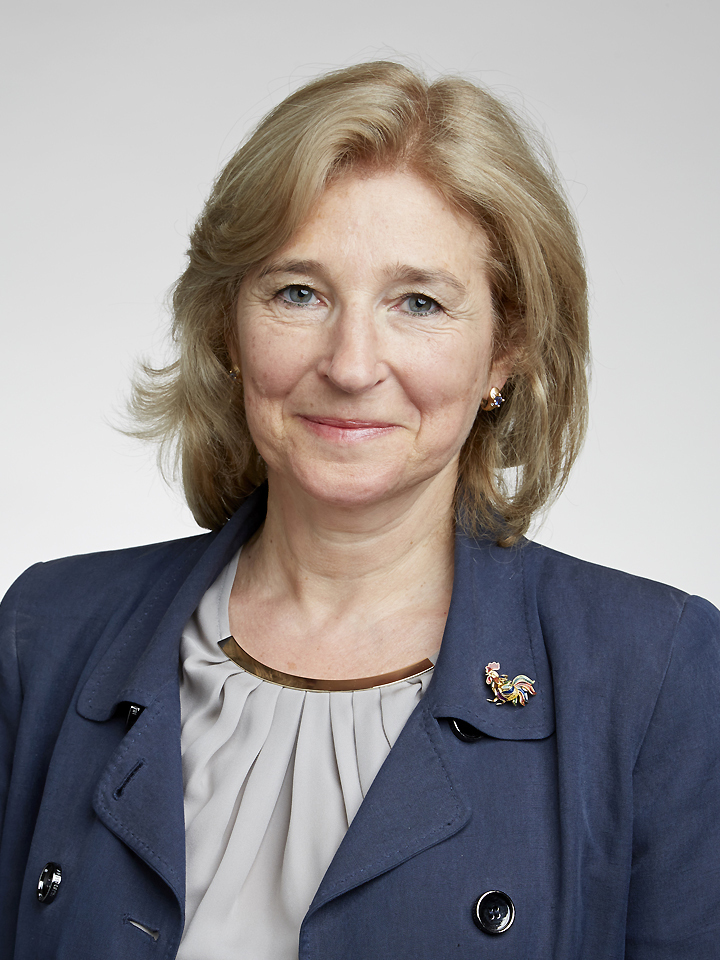
- Bayvel in 2016
- Born: 14 April 1966 (age 60); Kharkiv, Ukrainian SSR, Soviet Union
- Citizenship: British
- Education: Hasmonean High School for Girls
- Alma mater: University College London (BSc, PhD)
- Children: Two
- Awards: Clifford Paterson Lecture (2014)
- Scientific career
- Fields: Optical communications; Nonlinear optics; Photonics
- Workplaces: Nortel; Standard Telephones and Cables; University College London
- Thesis: Stimulated Brillouin scattering in single mode optical fibre ring resonators (1990)
- Website: www.ee.ucl.ac.uk/staff/academic/pbayvel

Dame Polina Leopoldovna Bayvel (Russian: Полина Леопольдовна Байвель; born 14 April 1966) is a British engineer and academic. She is currently Professor of Optical Communications & Networks in the Department of Electronic and Electrical Engineering at University College London. She has made major contributions to the investigation and design of high-bandwidth multiwavelength optical networking.

== Education and early life ==
Bayvel was born into a Jewish family, and grew up in Kharkiv and Leningrad (now St. Petersburg) until 1978. Her father is the physicist Leopold P. Bayvel, her mother Raisa (Rachel) was a textile/pattern technologist/garment engineer and later published studies in Eastern-European Jewish history.

She was educated in England at Hasmonean High School for Girls and University College London where she was awarded a Bachelor of Engineering degree in 1986 followed by a PhD in 1990. In 1990, she was awarded a Royal Society Postdoctoral Exchange Fellowship in the Fibre Optics Laboratory at the General Physics Institute of the Soviet Academy of Sciences in Moscow.

== Research and career ==
Bayvel's research has focused on maximising the speed and capacity of optical fibre communication systems, and the fundamental studies of capacity-limiting optical nonlinearities and their mitigation. She has made major contributions to the investigation and design of high-bandwidth, multi-wavelength optical communication networks.

She was one of the first to show the feasibility of using the wavelength domain for routing in optical networks over a range of distance- and time-scales. She has established the applicability of these new optical network architecture concepts, which have been widely implemented in commercial systems and networks. These systems and networks underpin the Internet, and the digital communications infrastructure – and are essential for its growth. A new project, the Initiate project, aims to test technologies that will make internet connections faster and more secure, which Polina Bayvel indicated will allow them to test them at a national scale. Her research has been funded by the Engineering and Physical Sciences Research Council (EPSRC).

== Awards and honours ==
Bayvel won the Institute of Physics Clifford Paterson Medal and Prize in 2002. She was also elected a Fellow of the Royal Academy of Engineering in 2002 and was awarded the Institute of Electrical and Electronics Engineers (IEEE) Photonic Society Engineering Achievement Award in 2013. Bayvel was awarded an honorary Doctorate of Science degree in 2014 by the University of South Wales. In 2014 she delivered the Clifford Paterson Lecture and in 2015 was awarded the Royal Academy of Engineering Colin Campbell Mitchell Award. She was elected a Fellow of the Royal Society (FRS) in 2016. Bayvel was appointed Commander of the Order of the British Empire (CBE) in the 2017 New Year Honours for services to engineering.

In 2019, Bayvel was elected to the Board of Directors of The Optical Society, serving a three-year term 2020–2022.

In 2023, Bayvel was awarded the Royal Society Rumford Medal for pioneering contributions to the fundamental physics and nonlinear optics, enabling the realization of high capacity, broad bandwidth, multi-wavelength, optical communication systems that have underpinned the information technology revolution. She is the first woman to be awarded this medal since the medal was instituted in 1800.

== Personal life ==
Polina Bayvel has two sons.
