= Liam Halligan =

English economist and journalist (born 1969)

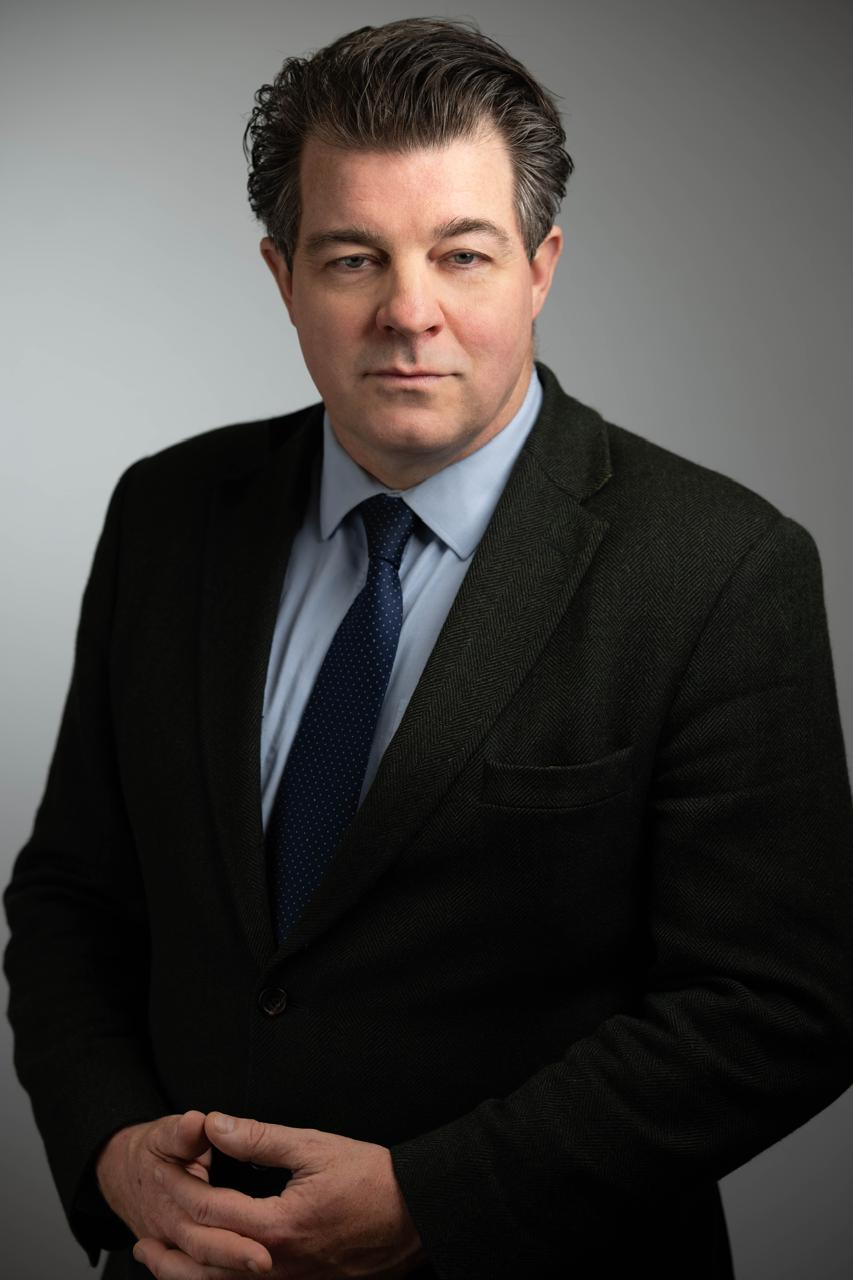
- Halligan in 2026
- Born: Liam James Halligan; 29 April 1969 (age 57); London, England
- Education: University of Warwick (BSc); St Antony's College, Oxford (MPhil)
- Occupations: Economist, journalist, broadcaster
- Employer(s): GB News; The Economist; Financial Times; Channel 4 News; GQ; The Daily Telegraph
- Children: 3
- Awards: British Press Award, Wincott Award, Business Journalist of the Year Award
- Website: liamhalligan.com

Liam James Halligan (born 29 April 1969) is a British economist, journalist, author and broadcaster. Since 2003, Halligan has written a weekly column in The Sunday Telegraph. He also presents The Telegraph's weekly Planet Normal podcast.

In July 2026, he was appointed Director of the Centre for Policy Studies, a Westminster-based think tank, and is due to take up the position in September 2026.

== Early life and education ==
Halligan was born to an Irish family and grew up in Kingsbury, northwest London. Halligan attended the John Lyon School in Harrow-on-the-Hill on a scholarship, where he became head boy.

The first person in his family to attend university, he graduated with a first-class degree in economics from the University of Warwick and went on to gain an MPhil in economics from St Antony's College, Oxford.

== Career ==
=== Economics and policy ===
In 1992, following graduation, Halligan joined his former university tutor Robert Skidelsky at The Social Market Foundation, the Westminster-based think tank. He later worked at the International Food Policy Research Institute and in the Fiscal Affairs Department at the International Monetary Fund in Washington, USA, as a research economist.

In 1994, Halligan joined the Centre for Economic Performance at the London School of Economics and moved to Moscow. In Moscow he shared a flat with Dominic Cummings.

Together with other economists from LSE, Oxford and Harvard, he co-founded Russian Economic Trends, an academic journal that published macroeconomic data, analysis and commentary on Russia. He also helped to establish the Russian-European Centre for Economic Policy, an inter-governmental policy advisory group.

Since 1997, Halligan has sat on the Policy Advisory Board of The Social Market Foundation. In 2010, he became a founder member of the Centre for Competitive Advantage in the Global Economy (CAGE), an ESRC-funded research centre at the University of Warwick.

In 2017, Halligan was invited to join an expert advisory committee at the Department for International Trade. He has also testified before a number of Parliamentary committees. In April 2020, he called for the Government to build more social housing. In February 2021, he appeared before the Lords Economic Affairs Select Committee on quantitative easing.

In 2019, he published Home Truths, which described and provided solutions to address the UK's housing shortage - including the use of zonal planning laws, policies to discourage land-banking by large developers and mechanisms to provide more social housing.

In 2020, he was shortlisted by the Government for the post of Downing Street TV Press Secretary. Since 2016, Halligan has been a governor, then Deputy Chair of governors at the John Lyon School.

Since 2022, Halligan has also served as a governor of Harrow School, in addition to his role as a governor of the John Lyon School. In July 2026, Halligan was appointed Director of the Centre for Policy Studies, a Westminster-based think tank. He is due to take up the position in September 2026.

=== Journalism ===
In the early 1990s, Halligan wrote a weekly column for The Moscow Times and covered Russian economics and politics for The Economist and The Economist Intelligence Unit. He also wrote about the former Soviet Union for The Wall Street Journal and Euromoney.

In 1996, Halligan was appointed political correspondent at the Financial Times. He covered the 1997 general election and Good Friday Agreement as part of a team led by political editor Robert Peston. He went on to become economics correspondent at Channel 4 News, where he remained until 2006.

From 1999 to 2002, while at Channel 4 News, Halligan wrote a weekly economics column for Sunday Business before moving his column to The Sunday Telegraph. In 2006, he was appointed economics editor at The Sunday Telegraph. From 2008 to 2010, he wrote a monthly column for GQ.

Halligan was a founding panellist on the daily television discussion show CNN Talk. He was a regular panellist on This Week, presented by Andrew Neil. When the BBC axed the programme in 2019, Halligan said the corporation had made a "blindingly obvious mistake".

Since 2004, he has also regularly presented standalone documentaries on Channel 4, including for Dispatches, and sits on the jury of the Royal Television Society's Specialist Journalist and Political Journalist Award.

From September 2021 to August 2022, Halligan presented his own show on GB News, On The Money, which ran for an hour every weekday and focused on financial topics. From September 2022, Halligan appeared across the GB News schedule, with his coverage centred on the cost-of-living crisis but also including major political interviews.

In June 2024, Halligan departed GB News, going on to create his "When The Facts Change" substack.

Halligan has also written for New Statesman, Prospect, and UnHerd. He also writes for The Spectator and The Sun. He has presented shows on LBC and BBC Radio 5 Live.

=== Business ===
Between 2008 and 2013, Halligan was Chief Economist at Prosperity Capital Management, an institutional asset management company focused on Russia, Ukraine and Central Asia..

Since 2014, Halligan has been a shareholder at Bne IntelliNews, where he is also Editor-at-Large.

== Personal life ==
He has two daughters and one son with his former partner, the journalist and author Lucy Ward.

Halligan is a citizen of both the UK and the Republic of Ireland. In 2012, he was invited to join the Global Irish Network, an advisory board of Irish nationals living outside Ireland. He is also a regular panellist at the Kilkenomics Festival.

His hobbies include guitar, double bass, traditional Irish music, choral music, film, rowing, and sailing.

Since 2013, he has participated in the annual London-to-Paris-in-24-hours bike ride, raising funds for Duchenne UK.

He is now in a relationship with Kate Garraway.

== Recognition ==
=== As an individual ===
- 1998. Business Broadcaster of the Year. The Wincott Foundation Awards.
- 2005. Business Broadcast Journalist of the Year. World Leadership Forum.
- 2006. Business Broadcast Journalist of the Year. World Leadership Forum.
- 2007. Business Commentator of the Year. British Press Awards.
- 2007. Columnist of the Year. WorkWorld Media Award.

=== For output ===
- 1999. Programme of the Year – Channel 4 News (Economics and Business). The Industrial Society Awards.
- 2002. UK Current Affairs Programme of the Year – Channel 4 News (Economics and Business). The Wincott Foundation Awards.
- 2002. UK Current Affairs Programme of the Year – Channel 4 News (Economics and Business). WorkWorld Media Award.
- 2007. UK Current Affairs Programme of the Year – Dispatches. The Wincott Foundation Awards.
- 2018. UK Current Affairs Programme of the Year – Dispatches. The Wincott Foundation Awards.

== Selected bibliography ==
- 2020. Groupthink, Brexit and the Future of the BBC. Published in Is The BBC Still In Peril – And Does It Deserve To Be? Bite-Sized Books.
- 2019. Home Truths: The UK’s Chronic Housing Shortage – How it Happened, Why it Matters and How to Solve It. Biteback.
- 2017. Clean Brexit: How to Make a Success of Leaving the European Union. Biteback. (with Gerard Lyons)
- 2012. Africa: The Last True investment Frontier. Published in The EU and Africa. Hurst & Co.
- 2006. No Choice but Compulsion: Why We Should Be Forced To Save For Old Age. Published in Defusing the Pension Time Bomb. Stockholm Network.
- 1998. Lessons from Attempted Macroeconomic Stabilisations in Russia. Social Market Foundation/Centre for Transition Economies. (with Robert Skidelsky)
- 1997. Investment Disincentives in Russia. Communist Economies & Economic Transformation. (with Pavel Teplukhin)
- 1997. Consumer Price Reforms & Safety Nets in Transition Economies. Published in Fiscal Policy and Economic Reform: Essays in Honor of Vito Tanzi, Blejer M. & T. Ter-Minassian. Routledge (with Ehtisham Ahmad)
- 1995. Russia's New Parliament: A Business Analysis. Economist Intelligence Unit.
- 1994. Europe Isn’t Working – Active Labour Market Policies Across the EU. Institute of Community Studies. (with Frank Field)
- 1993. Beyond Unemployment. Social Market Foundation. (with Robert Skidelsky)
- 1993. Another Great Depression: Historical Lessons for the 1990s. Social Market Foundation. (with Robert Skidelsky)

== Selected filmography ==
=== Presenter ===
- 2021. Britain's £400bn Covid Bill – Who Will Pay? Dispatches. Channel 4.
- 2020. Britain's Train Hell. Dispatches. Channel 4.
- 2019. Britain's New-Build Scandal. Dispatches. Channel 4.
- 2019. HS2: The Great Train Robbery. Dispatches. Channel 4.
- 2018. Carillion: How to Lose Seven Billion Pounds. Dispatches. Channel 4.
- 2016. Britain's Home-Building Scandal. Dispatches. Channel 4.
- 2013. Quantitative Easing: Miracle Cure or Dangerous Addiction? BBC Radio 4.
- 2007. NHS – Where Did All the Money Go? Dispatches. Channel 4.
- 2006. Public Service, Private Profit. Dispatches. Channel 4.
- 2006. Whose Pension Are You Paying? 30 Minutes. Channel 4.
- 2004. How Safe Is Your Pension? 30 Minutes. Channel 4.

=== Producer ===
- 2020. Neither Confirm Nor Deny.
