= Michael Crowley-Milling =

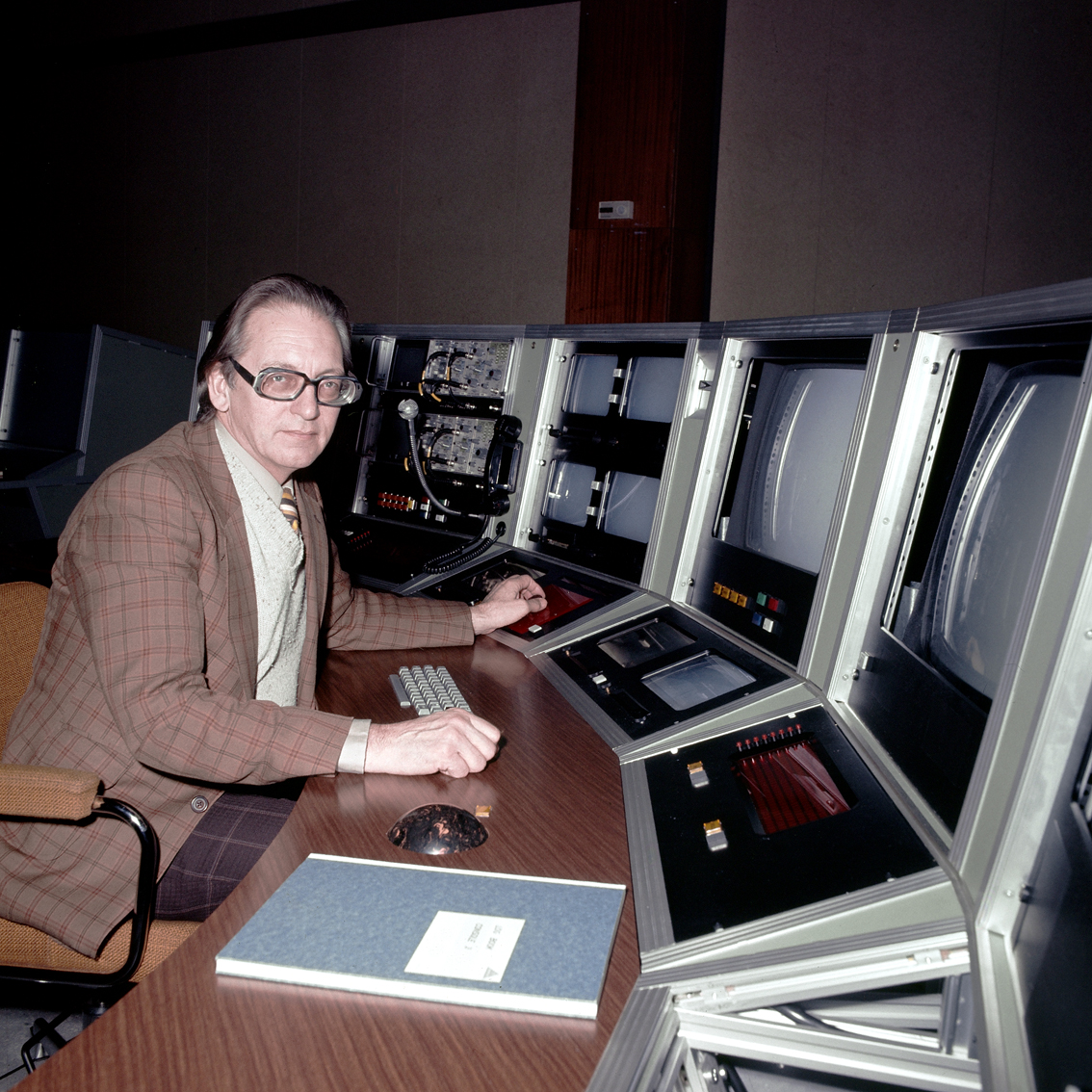
Michael Crowley-Milling in the control room of the CERN Super Proton Synchrotron.

Michael Crowley-Milling (7 May 1917 – 2012), known as Michael Crowley Crowley-Milling from 1947, CMG, MA, C Eng, FIEE, was an engineering project manager, who did innovative work in accelerator design and large-scale computer control, and rose in the ranks of CERN to become first a division head in 1977 and then a member of the CERN directorate in 1980. He was awarded the Glazebrook Medal of the Institution of Electrical Engineers and was honoured by the Royal Society, for his achievements, by being asked to give their Clifford Paterson Lecture in 1982. He is perhaps best known as the person who helped to invent the world's first computer touchscreens. He was the older brother of Sir Denis Crowley-Milling.

== Education and early career ==
He was born on 7 May 1917 at Rhyl, North Wales.

The family was of a liberal bent politically. David Lloyd George was a close family friend.

Both Michael and his younger brother, Denis, attended Radley College.

In 1935 he went up to St John’s College, Cambridge, where he read for the Mechanical Sciences - Electrical Engineering Tripos, graduating with honours in 1938 and proceeding to the MA five years later.

== Working career ==
Because of his poor eyesight, he was not enlisted in the services. He joined Metropolitan Vickers in Manchester, first as a graduate trainee, and subsequently as a member of the engineering staff. During the war he worked on Microwave Radar, initially as a junior member of the team, at Malvern, developing that technology under Robert Watson-Watt.

After the war, Crowley-Milling started to work on accelerators, and he did pioneering work on linear accelerators, with applications both in experimental physics and medicine. He also worked with analogue computers. His work started to be used more widely, and he was involved with the design of a proton linear accelerator at AERE, Harwell – which was the prototype for the Linac injector for the PS accelerator at CERN.

In 1963 he was invited to join the newly founded Daresbury Laboratory. There he was responsible for the Injector RF and the vacuum system. He became leader of the Applied Physics Group, and as such participated, first in design studies for a 15/20 GeV electron synchrotron NINA, and then for the planned 300 GeV Super Proton Synchrotron at CERN.

== Career at CERN ==
In 1971 Crowley-Milling arrived at CERN. In his function as leader of the Controls Group, he was asked to build a computer control and monitoring system for the new accelerator that was in the design process. This decision allowed him the freedom to introduce some revolutionary new ideas, such as the use of an interpreted control computer language, NODAL. This innovation let the equipment designers themselves to write the programs needed for the control of their equipment without the need for specialized application programmers. The touch screen designed in Crowley-Milling's group became later the main operator interface which was another major innovation at the time. In 1977, soon after the SPS was commissioned, Crowley-Milling was promoted to SPS Division Leader, and three years later to join the CERN directorate.

He was subsequently made Companion of the Order of St Michael and St George (CMG) in the 1982 Birthday Honours, the Glazebrook Medal of the IEE, and gave the Clifford Paterson Lecture of 1982, “ The world’s largest accelerator: the electron-positron collider, LEP” at the Royal Society.

== Private life ==
Crowley-Milling was married to Gladys, “Gee”, (daughter of W.G.Dickson), who predeceased him. They had no children together. Gladys had a daughter, Carol, from a previous marriage, to David Adamson of Adamsons Jam Blairgowrie.

His brother Denis, who started with the same school background, was a war hero (he was Douglas Bader’s #2 in the Battle of Britain) and rose through the ranks of the RAF to become an Air Chief Marshal. Michael always lived in the shadow of this brother, and would have been surprised to be told that his achievements in applied science were considered by many to have been at least as great.

His great hobby was the refurbishment of a 1931 Alfa Romeo car used in the Monza Rally, which he had received as a 21st birthday present from his father. He sold this car for two million pounds late in his retirement.

On his death in 2012 he left a considerable sum as a bequest to the Royal Society for scholarships to young engineers.
