= Gary Gibbon =

English journalist

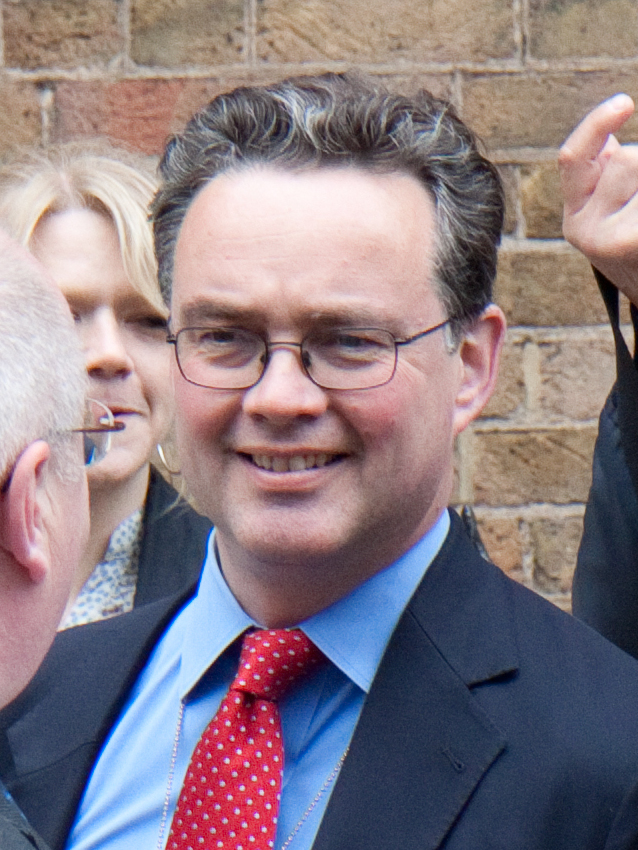
- Gibbon in 2010
- Born: 15 March 1965 (age 61); Harrow, London, England
- Education: John Lyon School; Balliol College, Oxford
- Occupation: Political editor
- Employer: Channel 4 News

Gary Gibbon (born 15 March 1965) is an English journalist. He has been the political editor of Channel 4 News since 2005. Previously, he had served as the programme's political correspondent since 1994. He has worked on five general elections for Channel 4 News and covered the peace process in Northern Ireland.

== Life and career ==
Gibbon was educated at The John Lyon School, in Harrow in north-west London and read History at Balliol College, Oxford, where he was awarded a first class degree.

Gary Gibbon's interview with Peter Mandelson in 2001 triggered the Northern Ireland Secretary's second resignation from the Cabinet. In 2005, Gibbon broadcast "the first account of the Attorney General's legal opinion on the war in Iraq" and won the 2006 Royal Television Society Home News Award with Jon Snow for that scoop. He revealed some details of one of Tony Blair's pre-war meetings with George W. Bush. He was also awarded Political Broadcaster of the Year award by The Political Studies Association in 2008 and the Royal Television Society 2010 Specialist Broadcaster of the Year award.
