= Daryl E. Hooper =

Australian electronic engineer

- Daryl Egbert Hooper
- Born: 3 December 1930
- Died: 1985 (aged 54–55); Tring, UK
- Education: University of Melbourne
- Known for: Amplifier design
- Scientific career
- Fields: Electronic engineer
- Workplaces: La Trobe University; University of Melbourne; GEC Research Hirst Centre; Plessey Company
- Academic advisors: Charles E. Moorhouse; Arthur E. Ferguson

Daryl Egbert Hooper was an electronic engineer notable for pioneering engineering at La Trobe University and heading up the GEC Research Hirst Centre in the 1980s. He is also notable for his textbook on amplifier design.

== Education ==
Hooper graduated from Melbourne High School in December 1949. He received a bachelor's degree in electrical engineering (B. Eng.) from the University of Melbourne in 1953. He completed his master of engineering (M. Eng.) at the University of Melbourne, with a 1962 thesis entitled: The Characterization of Transistors.

== Career ==
His first appointment was as a Research Engineer with GEC in London, there in 1956 he secured a patent for an improved transistor oscillator design. Hooper then returned to the University of Melbourne where he spent 10 years in the Electrical Engineering Department, first as a Lecturer and later as a Senior Lecturer. In 1967, he joined Plessey Pacific and subsequently was promoted to Chief Engineer of the Plessey Company in the UK, in charge of research and development.

Hooper's research and teaching experience was mainly in the area of transistor theory and characterization, pulse-forming circuits, wide band amplifiers, active filters and integrated circuit design. In 1968, Edward Moore Cherry and Daryl Hooper published their book on circuit design entitled Amplifying Devices and Low-Pass Amplifier Design. The book ran to 1036 pages and was regarded as the premier book on the design of transistor amplifiers.

In 1975, Hooper was appointed to the Tad Szental Chair in Communication Engineering at La Trobe University with the charge to establish the first engineering department at La Trobe. His Department of Communication Engineering took in its first students in 1976. Hooper left La Trobe in 1980 to take up the position of Head of one of the Laboratories of the GEC Research Hirst Centre in Wembley, UK under the Director Derek Roberts. Subsequently, in 1983 he became Director of HRC.

== Death ==
In 1985, Hooper died suddenly at home in Tring, UK. A lecturer theatre, at La Trobe University, is named after him. A series of seminars given by graduating final year students is named in his honour. The Hooper Memorial Prize named after him.

== Selected works ==
- D. E. Hooper and D. V. McCaughan, "A comparison of technologies [semiconductor ICs]," GEC Journal of Science & Technology, Vol. 48(2), pp. 76–82, 1982.
- D. E. Hooper and D. H. Roberts, "Silicon systems," GEC Journal of Science & Technology, Vol. 48(2), pp. 52–55, 1982.
- D. E. Hooper, D. H. Roberts, B. D. Prazic, J. S. Whitelegge, K. L. Jones, and H. E. Oldham, "Microelectronics in GEC," GEC Journal of Science & Technology, Vol. 48(2), 1982.
- D. E. Hooper, "The advanced bipolar i.c. process," New Electronics, Vol. 7(8), p. 28-35, 1974.
- J. M. Deacon, J. Heighway, D. E. Hooper, and D. W. Tarrant, "Electronically variable analogue delay," Electronics Letters, pp. 229–230, 1973.
- D. E. Hooper, "An introduction to analogue techniques in M.O.S.T. integrated circuits," Proc. IREEE, Australia, pp. 151–163, 1968.
- E. M. Cherry and D. E. Hooper, "The design of wide-band transistor feedback amplifiers," Proc. IEE, Vol. 110(2), pp. 375–389, 1963.
- D. E. Hooper and A. R. T. Turnbull, "Applications of the charge-control concept to transistor characterization," Proc. IREE, Australia, Vol. 23(3), pp. 132–147, 1962.
- D. E. Hooper and A. E. Jackets, "Current derived resistance-capacitance oscillators using junction transistors," Electronic Engineering, Vol. 28, pp. 333–337, 1956.

== Books by Hooper ==
- D. E. Hooper, Communications in the Seventies: The Achievement and the Prospect, La Trobe University, Bundoora, 1976, ISBN 0-85816-100-1.
- E. M. Cherry and D. E. Hooper, Amplifying Devices and Low-Pass Amplifier Design, Wiley, New York, 1968, ISBN 0-471-15345-1.
