= Jean Bacon =

British computer scientist

- Born: 1942 (age 83–84); Sheffield, England
- Awards: IEEE Fellow; BCS Fellow
- Scientific career
- Fields: Distributed systems
- Workplaces: University of Cambridge
- Website: www.cl.cam.ac.uk/~jmb25/

Jean Bacon (born 1942) is a British emeritus professor of distributed systems at the Computer Laboratory at the University of Cambridge, where she co-headed the Opera Research Group from its founding in the 1990s. Previously, she taught at Hatfield Technical College where, in the 1970s, she was involved in the design of one of the earliest computer science degree programs offered in the United Kingdom. Bacon retired from her faculty position at Cambridge in 2010 but has continued to work on Opera projects related to distributed systems and security in cloud computing.

== Early life and career ==
Bacon was born in Sheffield in 1942 in a working-class family. She attended Penistone Grammar School and went on to receive her B.S. in mathematics from the University of London. Her first introduction to computing came from a summer job in the early 1960s, after which she worked in computer-related jobs at the National Physical Laboratory and the GEC Hirst Research Centre. In 1968 she transitioned to teaching in Higher National Certificate and Higher National Diploma programs while working on her M.Sc. on a part-time basis. She moved in 1973 to Hatfield – now the University of Hertfordshire – where she was involved in designing an early example of a degree program in computer science. After the birth of her son in 1976, Bacon continued to teach while working on her Ph.D. at Hatfield part-time, studying kernel design and distributed systems.

== Research career ==
In 1985 Bacon moved to a faculty position in the Computer Laboratory at the University of Cambridge, where her work focused on the design of distributed systems and middleware. She was the first woman to join the Computer Laboratory. There she was a co-leader of the Opera Research Group since its founding in the 1990s. She has also published several textbooks on concurrent and distributed systems.

Bacon is a Fellow of the IEEE and of the British Computer Society. She was the founding editor in chief of the IEEE publication now known as IEEE Distributed Systems Online and served two terms on the IEEE Board of Governors from 2002–04 and 2005–07. In 2013, she was awarded the honorary degree of Doctor of the University by Open University.

== Education ==
Bacon has earned 4 degrees, 3 the conventional way and 1 honorary degree.

Type	Discipline	School	Year
BSc	Mathematics	University of London	1963
MSc	Computer Science	Council for National Academic Awards	1967
PhD	Computer Science	Council for National Academic Awards	1982
Honorary Doctorate		Open University	2014

== Personal life ==
Bacon has one son, born in 1976. She is also an artist and has exhibited paintings.
