= Harold Barlow =

British electrical engineer (1899–1989)

Harold Barlow FRS
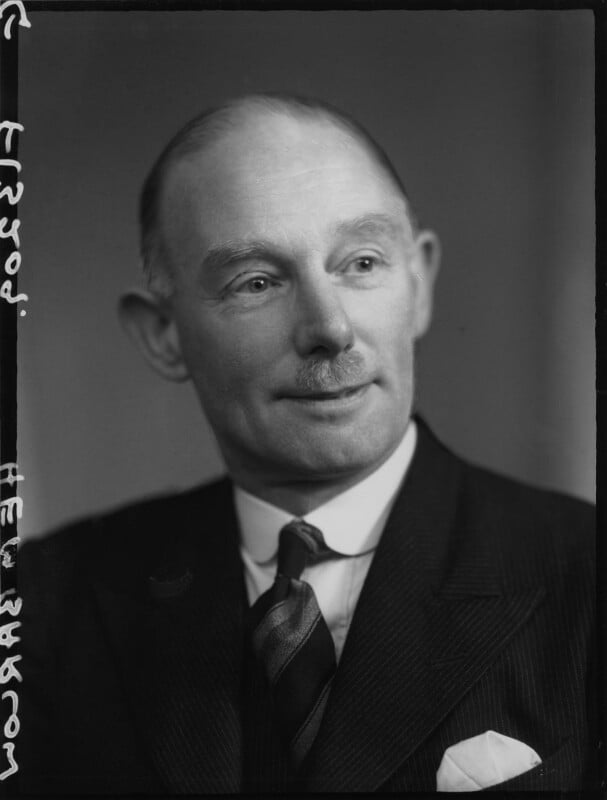
- Barlow in 1950
- Born: Harold Everard Monteagle Barlow; 15 November 1899; London, England
- Died: 20 April 1989 (aged 89); Epsom, England
- Resting place: Bandon Hill Cemetery
- Education: City and Guilds College: Diploma, Electrical Engineering; University of London: BSc, Engineering; PhD, Science
- Spouse: Janet Hastings Eastwood (m. 1931)
- Children: 4
- Relatives: Leonard Monteagle Barlow (brother)
- Awards: Faraday Medal (1967); Royal Medal (1988)
- Scientific career
- Fields: Electrical engineering
- Workplaces: University College London
- Doctoral advisor: Ambrose Fleming
- Doctoral students: Charles K. Kao

Harold Everard Monteagle Barlow (15 November 1899 – 20 April 1989) was a British electrical engineer and a pioneer of radio-frequency waveguides.

== Biography ==
Harold Everard Monteagle Barlow was born on 15 November 1899 in Islington, London, England, the second of six children of Katherine (née Monteagle) and Leonard Barlow. His father was born on Seven Sisters Road, London, while his mother was born in Glasgow, Scotland. His older brother was Lieutenant Leonard Monteagle Barlow.

=== Education ===
In 1915, Barlow won a Mitchell Scholarship to study electrical engineering at the City and Guilds College in Finsbury, where his professors were Silvanus P. Thompson and William Eccles. After graduating from the college in 1917, he joined the Royal Naval Volunteer Reserve (RNVR) to work on radio equipment used by the Royal Navy during World War I. He was demobilised in January 1919.

With the help of Provost Gregory Foster, Barlow was admitted to University College London (UCL) in 1919, where he graduated with first-class honours in Engineering the following year. While a graduate student, he worked as a research assistant to Professor Ambrose Fleming in the Department of Electrical Engineering until 1923, when he received a Doctor of Philosophy in Science. After obtaining his doctorate, he joined his father's business, Barlow & Young Ltd. He took up a teaching post at UCL in October 1924.

=== Career ===
Barlow played a leading part in the development of radar during World War II. In 1939, he was seconded to work on radar development, and worked at the Telecommunications Research Establishment from 1943 to 1945. He then served as Superintendent of the Radio Department at the Royal Aircraft Establishment in Farnborough until 1950.

In 1950, Barlow was appointed Professor of Electrical Engineering at UCL, and was put in charge of rebuilding the laboratories damaged by the war. Along with his assistant, Alexander Lamb Cullen, he conducted groundbreaking research on microwave waveguides, which included the development of the circular H10 waveguide. Under his professorship, the MSc course in Microwave Engineering was introduced to UCL. He was the supervisor of PhD student Charles K. Kao, who went on to win the Nobel Prize in Physics in 2009. Barlow retired from UCL in 1967.

== Personal life and death ==
In 1931, Barlow married Janet Hastings Eastwood (1904–1990), the daughter of a Presbyterian minister. They had three boys and one daughter.

Barlow died on 20 April 1989 in Epsom at the age of 89. He was buried in Bandon Hill Cemetery in Wallington.

== Recognition ==
=== Memberships ===
| Year | Organisation | Type | Ref. |
|---|---|---|---|
| 1961 | Royal Society | Fellow | |
| 1979 | National Academy of Engineering | International Member | |

=== Awards ===
| Year | Organisation | Award | Citation | Ref. |
|---|---|---|---|---|
| 1967 | Institution of Electrical Engineers | Faraday Medal | — | |
| 1969 | International Union of Radio Science | John Howard Dellinger Gold Medal | "[For the] development of waveguides ; the characteristics of surface waves." | |
| 1974 | Institute of Electrical and Electronics Engineers | Mervin J. Kelly Award | "For outstanding work in the measurement and properties of radio frequency waves, and their application to telecommunications." | |
| 1985 | IEEE Microwave Theory & Technology Society | Microwave Career Award | — | |
| 1988 | Royal Society | Royal Medal | "In recognition of his distinguished research, particularly on microwaves and waveguides, and of his lasting influence as the founder of an unusually productive research school." | |

=== Honorary degrees ===
| Year | University | Degree | Ref. |
|---|---|---|---|
| 1971 | Heriot-Watt University | Doctor of Science | |
| 1973 | University of Sheffield | Doctor of Engineering | |
