= Reginald Otto Kapp =

Reginald Otto Kapp (2 August 1885-20 February 1966) was a professor of electrical engineering at UCL.

He was appointed to the Pender chair in 1935.
