= Clifford Copland Paterson =

English electrical engineer (1879–1948)

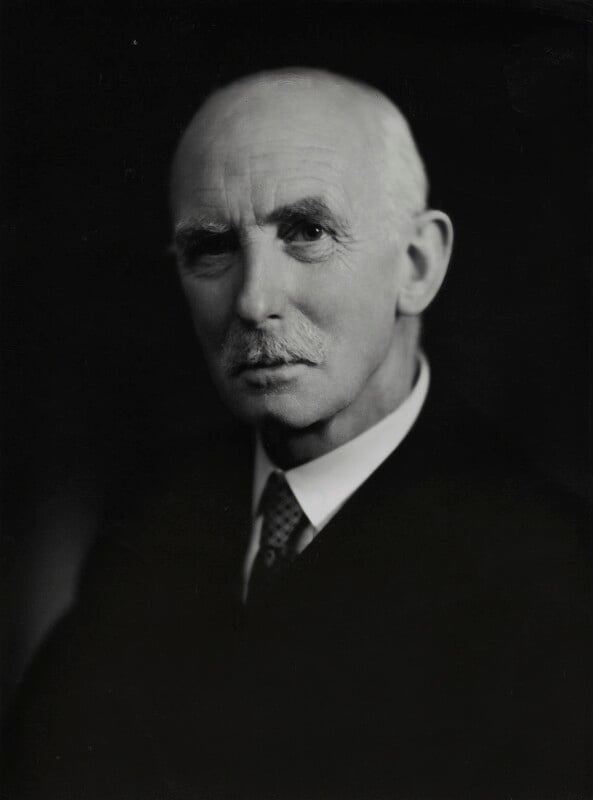
Paterson in 1947

Sir Clifford Copland Paterson FRS (1879–1948) was an English scientist and electrical engineer.

He was educated at Mill Hill School, the Finsbury Technical College, and Faraday House. He joined the newly established National Physical Laboratory in 1903, specialising in light and lighting. He was awarded an OBE in 1916 for his work on the Paterson-Walsh aircraft height finder.

In January 1916 Hugo Hirst, chairman and managing director of the General Electric Company, approached him with a view to him setting up a research department for the company's Osram lightbulb manufacturing division. He accepted a further invitation following the end of World War I, this time to establish a research facility to serve the whole of GEC. The laboratories came into existence at the start of 1919, initially housed at the Osram Lamp and Valve Works at Hammersmith. Planning for new purpose-built laboratories began almost immediately with a site being found at East Lane, Wembley, and the new buildings came into use in 1922. Paterson would remain as director of the laboratories – later named the Hirst Research Centre – until his death in 1948.

Paterson was the recipient of several honours, including an Honorary Doctorate in Science from the University of Birmingham in 1937, the Faraday Medal in 1945, the James Alfred Ewing Medal in 1946 and the Gold Medal of the Illuminating Engineering Society of North America in 1948; he was elected a Fellow of the Royal Society in 1942 and was knighted in 1946.

The Royal Society Clifford Paterson Lecture and the Institute of Physics Clifford Paterson Medal and Prize are named in his honour.
