= David Bevan (mathematician) =

English mathematician

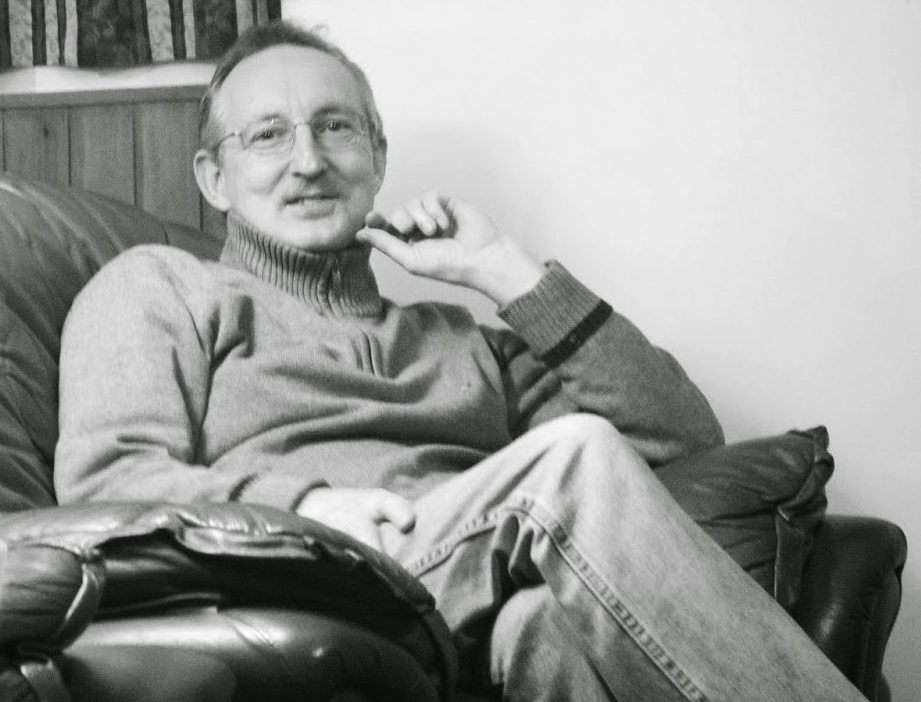
- Born: 16 November 1961 (age 64); Whitehaven, England
- Education: The Queen's College, Oxford; London School of Theology; The Open University
- Scientific career
- Fields: Mathematics; Computer science
- Workplaces: General Electric Company; Summer Institute of Linguistics; Pitney Bowes; The Open University; University of Strathclyde
- Thesis: On the growth of permutation classes (2015)
- Doctoral advisor: Robert Brignall.
- Website: dibevan.wordpress.com

David Bevan is an English mathematician, computer scientist and software developer. He is known for Bevan's theorem, which gives the asymptotic enumeration of grid classes of permutations and for his work on enumerating the class of permutations avoiding the pattern 1324. He is also known for devising weighted reference counting, an approach to computer memory management that is suitable for use in distributed systems.

== Work and research ==
Bevan was a lecturer in combinatorics in the department of Mathematics and Statistics at the University of Strathclyde. He has degrees in mathematics and computer science from the University of Oxford and a degree in theology from the London School of Theology. He received his PhD in mathematics from The Open University in 2015; his thesis, On the growth of permutation classes, was supervised by Robert Brignall.

In 1987, as a research scientist at GEC's Hirst Research Centre in Wembley, he developed an approach to computer memory management, called weighted reference counting, that is suitable for use in distributed systems. During the 1990s, while working for the Summer Institute of Linguistics in Papua New Guinea, he developed a computer program, called FindPhone, that was widely used by field linguists to analyse phonetic data in order to understand the phonology of minority languages. While employed by Pitney Bowes, he was a major contributor to the development of the FreeType text rendering library.

Bevan's mathematical research has concerned areas of enumerative combinatorics, particularly in relation to permutation classes. He established that the growth rate of a monotone grid class of permutations is equal to the square of the spectral radius of a related bipartite graph. He has also determined bounds on the growth rate of the class of permutations avoiding the pattern 1324. In the Acknowledgements sections of his journal articles, he often includes the Latin phrase Soli Deo gloria.

== Selected publications ==
- Bevan, D. I. (1987). "Distributed garbage collection using reference counting". PARLE Parallel Architectures and Languages Europe, Volume II: Parallel Languages. Springer. pp. 176–187.
- Bevan, David (1995). FindPhone: Phonological analysis for the field linguist. Summer Institute of Linguistics.
- Bevan, David (2015). "Growth rates of permutation grid classes, tours on graphs, and the spectral radius" (PDF). Trans. Amer. Math. Soc. 367 (8): 5863–5889. doi:10.1090/s0002-9947-2015-06280-1.
- Bevan, David (2015). "Permutations avoiding 1324 and patterns in Łukasiewicz paths" (PDF). J. London Math. Soc. 92 (1): 105–122. arXiv:1406.2890. doi:10.1112/jlms/jdv020. S2CID 9624777.
