= Robert James Clayton =

British electrical engineer

Sir Robert Clayton
- Born: Robert James Clayton; 30 October 1915; Fulham, London, UK
- Died: 20 June 1998 (aged 82); Brent, Middlesex, UK
- Citizenship: British
- Education: University of Cambridge
- Known for: Industrial electronics
- Scientific career
- Fields: Electronics engineer
- Workplaces: General Electric Company; GEC Hirst Research Centre

Sir Robert James Clayton CBE (30 October 1915 – 20 June 1998) was an English electronics engineer who was notable in the area of defence and industrial electronics. He worked for the GEC conglomerate for the whole of his career, becoming the company's technical director. Clayton is credited with playing a significant role in the post-war development of electronics in the United Kingdom.

== Early life ==
He was the only son of Frank Clayton, wine merchant's assistant, and his wife, Flora, née Gillbanks. His parents struggled to support themselves because his father, originally a clerk, had been invalided out of the services in the First World War and could seek only outdoor work. Thoughts of emigration to Canada were thwarted by his father's early death and Clayton's mother had to make a meagre living as a dressmaker. In later years he said that in effect he had been brought up by the Boy Scouts, convincing him that he could succeed by his own efforts. Clayton won two county scholarships leading to a major scholarship at Christ's College, Cambridge, specialising in physics.

== Career ==
Upon graduating in 1937 he joined the General Electric Company (GEC) research laboratories, at that time one of the leading industrial research centres, to work on the company's new television receivers. In spite of the turmoil of the emerging electronics industry, for the rest of his career he remained with GEC. With the outbreak of war the GEC laboratories were soon in the forefront of radar development, and Clayton's expertise was quickly applied to the development of airborne radar equipment. When the BBC resumed television service from Alexandra Palace after the war, GEC won the contract to implement the first link to another transmitter at Birmingham, based on Clayton's advanced proposal for a microwave radio relay. He coerced the rest of the laboratories to assist in bringing television to Birmingham on time in 1950.

In 1955, GEC invited Clayton to establish its Applied Electronics Laboratories at Stanmore, North London, to create a defence electronics capability, initially to develop missile guidance systems for the Royal Navy. By 1963 all the diverse GEC activities in electronics were brought together, with Clayton as managing director. At this point Arnold Weinstock took control of the vulnerable GEC and, with government encouragement, embarked on the rationalisation of the fragmented UK electrical industry. He soon recognised that Clayton could provide the necessary technical input to his own financial acumen, and in 1968 appointed Clayton technical director of the enlarged company. Clayton continued in this role, while turning his attention from streamlining the overlapping activities of the acquired companies to future ventures. However, Weinstock's growing financial caution was a limiting factor, and after Clayton joined the main board in 1978 he acted mainly in an advisory role and as the technical presence of the GEC on major issues, until he retired in 1983.

During the period of rationalisation of the UK electronics industry he was often perceived as a hard man who implemented Weinstock's plans. Equally, others saw him as protecting the essential research and development activities and endeavouring to move GEC into areas of future growth—often against a company culture of short-termism.

== Personal life ==
On 2 April 1949 he married Joy Kathleen (c. 1925–1997), daughter of Allan McFarlane King, an electrician, and they moved to live at Stanmore. They had no children.

In his retirement, ill health and blindness increasingly restricted his activities. He was widowed in 1997. He died at Northwick Park Hospital, Brent, on 20 June 1998. His cremation was marked only by an informal gathering of friends and the dedication of a copse of trees of the Woodland Trust. His wealth at death exceeded £2 million.

== Honours ==
He was a Fellow of the Royal Aeronautical Society; an Honorary Fellow of the Institution of Electrical Engineers, becoming President in 1975; and a Fellow of the Institute of Physics, becoming President in 1982. He was also a Fellow of the Fellowship of Engineering (later the Royal Academy of Engineering) and its Vice-president for 1980–82. In 1983 he was made an Honorary Fellow of Christ's College, Cambridge. He was awarded a number of Honorary Doctorates, for example Honorary Doctor of Science degrees from Aston University in 1979 and City University London in 1981.

Another outcome was the invitation to join many ‘quangos', including the National Enterprise Board (1978–80), the National Electronics Council (1973–83), the Parliamentary and Scientific Committee (1983–86), and the Monopolies and Mergers Commission (1983–89). At various times he also served on the University Grants Committee; standing conference on schools, science & technology; the advisory council of the Science Museum; and the British Library board. His earlier work at GEC had led to the award of an OBE (1960) and CBE (1970), and, with later contributions to public matters, a knighthood in 1980.
