= Ceri Brenner =

UK Physicist - Speaker & Laser specialist

Dr Ceri Brenner
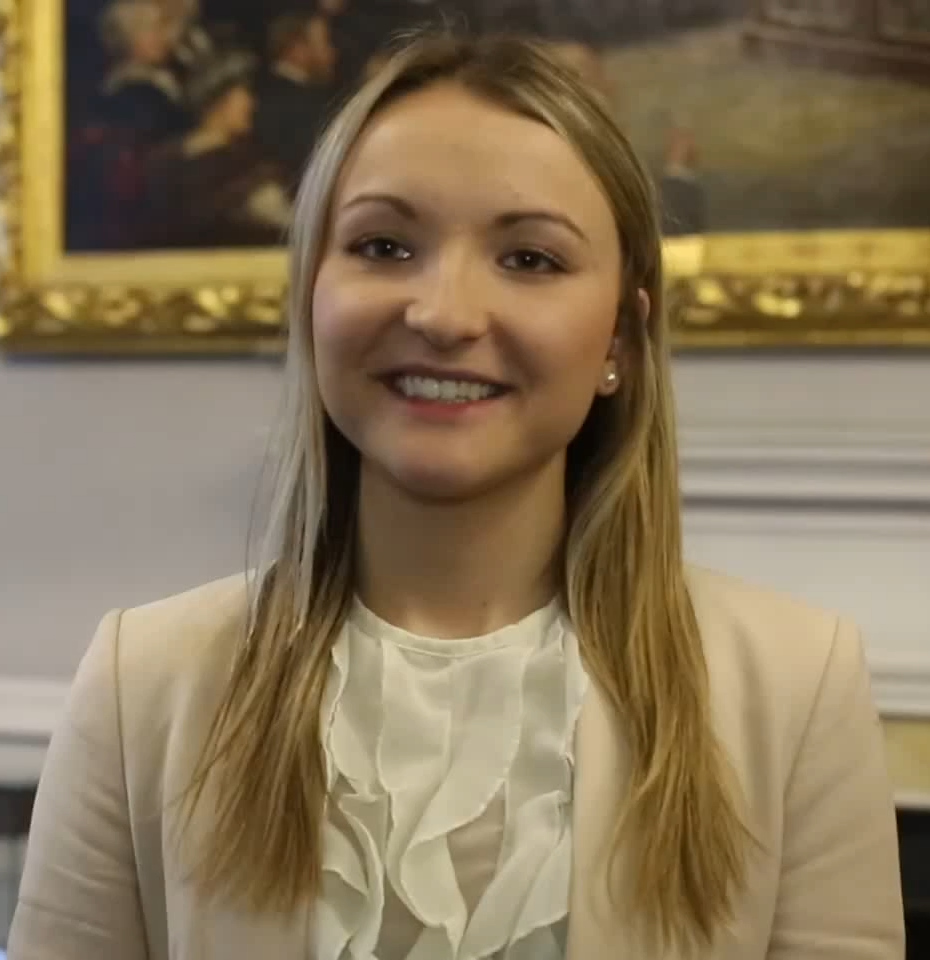
- Brenner in February 2014
- Born: Ceri Brenner
- Education: University of Oxford; University of Strathclyde
- Awards: IOP Paterson Medal (2017)
- Scientific career
- Fields: Physics; Plasma physics Laser science Innovation
- Workplaces: ANSTO
- Thesis: Laser-driver Proton Beams: Mechanisms for spectral control and efficiency enhancement (2012)
- Website: www.drceribrenner.co.uk

Ceri Brenner (born August 1987) is a British plasma physicist at the Science and Technology Facilities Council.

== Education ==
She studied physics at the University of Oxford. Following a summer placement at the Central Laser Facility at the Rutherford Appleton Laboratory, Brenner developed an interest in high power laser-plasma physics. Brenner earned a PhD in physics from the University of Strathclyde under the supervision of David Neely and Paul McKenna. She completed her doctoral experiments at Central Laser Facility, UK and the GSI Helmholtz Centre for Heavy Ion Research in Germany. Her doctoral thesis was titled 'Laser-driver Proton Beams: Mechanisms for spectral control and efficiency enhancement'.

== Career and research ==
Dr Brenner is the Leader of the Centre for Accelerator Science at ANSTO in Sydney, Australia. In this role she oversees a large team of accelerator scientists and engineers operating the centre's four ion accelerators.

From 2008 to 2021, Brenner worked for Science and Technology Facilities Council at the Central Laser Facility (CLF). At CLF, Brenner used the GEMINI super intense laser to investigate the fourth state of matter; plasma. Brenner is established as an expert in the applications of laser-accelerators, her work has investigated the potential industrial applications of neutron and x-ray beam generation.

Alongside her research, Brenner works with industry and business partners to translate her research findings into useful industrial applications in a range of areas including nuclear waste, aerospace, fusion energy and healthcare. She was recognised for her work in leading collaborations between industry and academia, being awarded the Institute of Physics Clifford Paterson Medal in 2017.

Brenner is a science communicator, she has written a quarterly column in the New Humanist magazine since 2014 where she conveys recent developments in physics to a lay audience. She won "I'm a Scientist, Get me out of here" in 2011 for communicating complex physics to school children.

Brenner is a vocal advocate for women in science, technology, engineering and mathematics (STEM) careers. She is a founding member of ScienceGrrl; a non-profit which celebrates and supports women in science. She is also an advocate for trans and the LGBT+ community and signed a letter to The Times newspaper to support the rights of trans and gender diverse people in universities.

== Awards ==
- Australian Institute of Physics Women in Physics Lecturer 2018
- Institute of Physics Clifford Paterson Medal and Prize 2017
