= Colin Webb (physicist) =

British physicist

professor Colin Webb MBE FRS
- Born: 9 December 1937 (age 88)
- Citizenship: British
- Education: University of Nottingham; Oriel College, Oxford
- Awards: Gabor Medal and Prize (1985); Clifford Paterson Lecture (1999); Glazebrook Medal and Prize (2001)
- Scientific career
- Fields: Physics
- Workplaces: Clarendon Laboratory; University of Oxford
- Doctoral students: Patrick Gill
- Website: www.jesus.ox.ac.uk/people/professor-colin-webb

Colin Edward Webb (born 9 December 1937) is a British physicist and former University of Oxford professor specialising in lasers.

== Education ==
Webb was educated at the University of Nottingham (BSc) and Oriel College, Oxford (DPhil).

== Career ==
After working at Bell Labs in Murray Hill, New Jersey, Webb returned to Oxford as a research fellow in physics at the Clarendon Laboratory in 1968, and was appointed to a university lectureship in 1971, becoming reader in 1990 and professor in 1992. He was head of Atomic and Laser Physics from 1995 to 1999 and became an emeritus professor in 2002. Jesus College, Oxford, appointed him to a Fellowship in 1973; he became a senior research fellow in 1988 and an emeritus fellow in 2005. Webb has supervised more than 35 DPhil students. In 1977, he founded Oxford Lasers, a company that began to manufacture high-power copper lasers and today focuses on high-speed imaging and laser micro-machining technology.

== Research ==
Webb is considered a pioneer in British laser research and has made significant contributions in the areas of hollow cathode metal-vapor lasers, copper vapour lasers, high-power copper vapour laser-pumped dye lasers, and excimer lasers. His work on hollow-cathode metal-vapor lasers led to the discovery of numerous new laser transitions in the visible spectrum.

His publications include (as editor in chief) Handbook of Laser Technology and Applications (2003) as well as various papers on lasers and laser mechanisms in academic journals and specialised books. He has also co-authored a textbook on laser physics in 2010, with Simon Hooker of Oxford.

== Awards and honours ==
Webb was appointed a Member of the Order of the British Empire in 2000. He was awarded the Duddell Medal and Prize (now called the Gabor Medal and Prize) in 1985 by the Institute of Physics and delivered the Paterson Lecture of the Royal Society in 1999. He won the Richard Glazebrook Medal and Prize in 2001.

He is a Fellow of the Optical Society of America and was elected a Fellow of the Royal Society (FRS) in 1991. He is also a Fellow of the Institute of Physics.
