= Alexander Lamb Cullen =

British engineer (1920–2013)

Alex Cullen OBE FREng FRS
- Born: Alexander Lamb Cullen; 30 April 1920; Lincoln, England
- Died: 27 December 2013 (aged 93)
- Education: Imperial College London
- Awards: Royal Medal (1984); Clifford Paterson Lecture (1984); Faraday Medal (1984)
- Scientific career
- Workplaces: University College London
- Thesis: Absolute power measurement at micro wave frequencies (1951)

Alexander Lamb Cullen, OBE FREng FRS (30 April 1920 – 27 December 2013) was a British electrical engineer and academic who was a professor at University College London.

== Career and research ==
In 1955, Cullen was appointed as the first Professor of Electrical Engineering at the University of Sheffield. He then served as the Head of Department of Electronic and Electrical Engineering at University College London where he held the Pender Chair, from 1967 to 1980. In 1988 he published his book Modern Radio Science and a biography of Harold Barlow.

=== Awards and honours ===
He was elected a Fellow of the Royal Society (FRS) in 1977 and awarded their Royal Medal in 1984 in recognition of his many distinguished contributions to microwave engineering, both theoretical and experimental, and in particular for research on microwave antennae. The same year he was awarded the Faraday Medal of the Institute of Electrical Engineers. He also the same year delivered the Clifford Paterson Lecture to the Royal Society on "Microwaves: the art and the science". He was appointed Order of the British Empire (OBE) in 1960.

== Selected publications ==
Journal articles

- Cullen, A. L. (1954). "The excitation of plane surface waves". Proceedings of the IEE - Part IV: Institution Monographs. 101 (7): 225–234. doi:10.1049/pi-4.1954.0028.
- Cullen, A. L.; Parr, J.C. (1955). "A new perturbation method for measuring microwave fields in free space". Proceedings of the IEE - Part B: Radio and Electronic Engineering. 102 (6): 836–844. doi:10.1049/pi-4.1954.0028.
- Cullen, A. L. (1958). "A travelling-wave parametric amplifier". Nature. 181 (4605): 332. Bibcode:1958Natur.181..332C. doi:10.1038/181332a0.
- Cullen, Alexander Lamb; Yu, P. K. (1971). "The accurate measurement of permittivity by means of an open resonator". Proceedings of the Royal Society A. 325 (1563): 493–509. Bibcode:1971RSPSA.325..493C. doi:10.1098/rspa.1971.0181.
- Cullen, Alexander Lamb; Yu, P. K. (1979). "Complex source-point theory of the electromagnetic open resonator". Proceedings of the Royal Society A. 366 (1725): 155–171. Bibcode:1979RSPSA.366..155C. doi:10.1098/rspa.1979.0045.
- Cullen, Alexander Lamb; Yu, P. K. (1982). "Measurement of permittivity by means of an open resonator. I. Theoretical". Proceedings of the Royal Society A. 380 (1778): 49–71. Bibcode:1982RSPSA.380...49Y. doi:10.1098/rspa.1982.0029.
