= Sarah Bohndiek =

Biomedical physicist

Sarah Elizabeth Bohndiek is a British biomedical physicist whose research involves developing novel imaging approaches for early cancer detection. She is a Professor in Biomedical Physics at the University of Cambridge and a Group Leader at the Cancer Research UK Cambridge Institute.

== Education ==
Bohndiek received her BA in Experimental and Theoretical Physics from the University of Cambridge in 2005. She then went on to complete a PhD in Radiation Physics at University College London in 2008, developing novel instrumentation for identification of cancer in breast biopsy samples using X-ray diffraction methods.

== Career and research ==
Following completion of her PhD, Bohndiek moved to the University of Cambridge where she worked as a postdoctoral research fellow at the Department of Biochemistry, supervised by Prof. Kevin Brindle. Her research during this period focused on the use of novel magnetic resonance imaging methods for the early detection of treatment response in cancer.

In 2011, Bohndiek took the position of Postdoctoral Scholar at Stanford University's Department of Radiology, supervised by Prof. Sam Gambhir.

In October 2013, Bohndiek returned to the University of Cambridge as a fellow of Corpus Christi College, working as a lecturer at the Cavendish Laboratory.

Bohndiek's research at the Cancer Research UK Cambridge Institute has focused on devising new imaging approaches to improve early cancer diagnosis. One project is using hyperspectral imaging in endoscopy to map early metabolic changes in the oesophagus before cancer occurs, giving an early indication of the potential for developing the cancer.

Bohndiek is co-lead of CRUK Cambridge Centre Early Detection Programme along with Rebecca Fitzgerald.

Bohndiek actively promotes science as a career, working with the Stemettes, MentorSET and engaging with media and public outreach.

== Awards and honours ==
Bohndiek was awarded the 2014 WISE Research Award sponsored by the Institution of Engineering and Technology and the Wellcome Trust. This award is given for groundbreaking scientific research by a female-led team.

In 2014 Bohndiek also received the Clifford Paterson Medal and Prize, which is awarded by the Institute of Physics for early career contributions to the application of physics in an industrial or commercial context. She received this award for her work in developing molecular imaging techniques, which can be applied to study the response of tissue to different cancer treatments.

Recognising her commitment to teaching and mentoring, Bohndiek was also awarded the Marie Skłodowska-Curie Prize for Nurturing Research Talent and a Suffrage Science Heirloom by the Medical Research Council.

In 2018, Bohndiek was awarded the Cancer Research UK Future Leaders in Cancer Research Prize which recognises individuals who have produced research of international importance.
