= Gordon Rawcliffe =

British electrical engineer and academic

Gordon Hindle Rawcliffe FRS (2 June 1910 – 3 September 1979) was a British electrical engineer and academic.

== Life ==
Gordon Hindle Rawcliffe, whose father was an Anglican clergyman in Sheffield, was born on 2 June 1910, moving from Sheffield to Gloucester when he was two. He was educated at the King's School, Gloucester, Hereford Cathedral School and St Edmund's School, Canterbury before matriculating at Keble College, Oxford to study mathematics. After his first-year examinations, he switched to engineering, under Richard V. Southwell, and obtained a first-class degree in 1932. He worked for the next five years for Metropolitan-Vickers in Manchester, initially as an apprentice and then as a design engineer. In 1937, more interested in the science of engineering than production methods, he moved to the University of Liverpool as lecturer in electrical engineering; four years later, he moved again, to the University of Aberdeen, as lecturer in charge of electrical engineering and departmental head of Robert Gordon's Technical College (now Robert Gordon University). In 1944, the University of Bristol appointed him Professor of Electrical Engineering, a post that he held for the next 31 years. After retiring in 1975, he died in Bristol of a heart attack on 3 September 1979, brought on by the asthma that affected his health throughout his life.

== Work ==
From 1955 onwards, Rawcliffe worked on polyphase winding of alternating current machinery. He developed the principle of pole amplitude modulation, enabling induction motors to run at different speeds; with his fellow-researchers, he filed more than 60 patents and wrote many scientific papers. He gave the Bernard Price Memorial Lecture in 1965 and the Clifford Paterson Lecture in 1977. He was elected a Fellow of the Royal Society in 1972, appointed an Honorary Fellow of Keble College, Oxford in 1976, and received honorary degrees from the universities of Loughborough and Bath.
