= Polymer (journal) =

- Discipline: Chemistry
- Language: English
- Edited by: Benny D. Freeman

Publication details
- History: 1997-present
- Publisher: Elsevier
- Frequency: Biweekly
- Open access: Yes
- Impact factor: 4.432 (2021)

Standard abbreviations
- ISO 4: Polymer

Indexing
- CODEN: POLMAG
- ISSN: 1873-2291
- OCLC no.: 67325480

Links
- Journal homepage; Online archive

Polymer is a peer-reviewed scientific journal covering all aspects of polymer science. It is published by Elsevier and the editor-in-chief is Benny D. Freeman (University of Texas at Austin).

According to the Journal Citation Reports, Polymer has a 2021 impact factor of 4.432.

== Abstracting and indexing ==
The journal is abstracted and indexed in:

- Chemical Abstracts Service
- Current Contents
- Inspec
- Scopus
