= Ian Robert Young =

British medical physicist (1932–2019)

Ian Robert Young OBE FRS FREng
- Born: Ian Robert Young; 11 January 1932
- Died: 27 September 2019 (aged 87)
- Education: Aberdeen University
- Occupation: Medical physicist

Ian Robert Young (11 January 1932 – 27 September 2019) was a British medical physicist, known for his work in the field of magnetic resonance imaging (MRI).

== Life ==
He was educated at Sedbergh School and later studied physics at Aberdeen University, then worked for EMI from 1976 to 1981, then for GEC from 1981 to 1982, when he became Chief Scientist of the NMR division of Picker International upon its creation.

He became visiting professor of radiology at the Royal Postgraduate Medical School in 1986. He was visiting professor at the Imperial College School of Medicine at Hammersmith Hospital from 1983 to 2001. He is also senior research fellow at Hirst Research Centre.

In 1992, he was awarded an honorary DSc by Aberdeen University. He was elected a Fellow of the Royal Academy of Engineering in 1988. and a Fellow of the Royal Society in 1989. In 1990 he was made an Honorary Fellow of the Royal College of Radiologists, and became an Officer of the Order of the British Empire in the 1986 Birthday Honours. He holds over 40 patents and has authored over 100 papers on MRI.

He won the 2004 Whittle Medal of the Royal Academy of Engineering, and was president of the Society of Magnetic Resonance in Medicine from 1991 to 1992.

He died on 27 September 2019 at the age of 87.
