= Kingfisher International =

Kingfisher International Pty Ltd
- Type: Private
- Industry: Telecommunications
- Founded: Melbourne, Australia (1986)
- Fate: Acquired by Tempo Communications
- Headquarters: Melbourne, Australia
- Area served: Worldwide
- Number of employees: Under 30
- Website: kingfisherfiber.com

Kingfisher International Pty Ltd is an Australian manufacturer of fiber optic test and measurement equipment, located in Mulgrave, Victoria.

The company has worldwide distribution channels, and currently participates in various national and international standards development groups.

Since 2014, the company has been wholly owned and managed by co-founder Bruce Robertson.

Kingfisher is one of the world's oldest fiber optic test companies, and is regarded by industry elders as having a significant influence on the development of the industry.

Kingfisher products are used by professional technicians when installing and maintaining fiber optic cabling and systems, and its fiber optic test equipment range includes such items as, optical power meters, optical light sources, optical loss test sets, optical test and inspection kits, variable optical attenuators, inspection microscopes and various optical fault locators.

In 2023, Kingfisher was acquired by Tempo Communications.

== Background ==
The company was co-founded in Melbourne in 1986. as an international electronics trading firm, by Rosmin Robertson (née Jaffer) and Bruce Robertson.

Bruce Robertson's technical involvement in fiber optics started 1980 - 1985, when he was a researcher at GEC's Hirst Research Centre in the UK, developing novel fiber optic cable designs, manufacturing processes, fiber optic sensors & instrumentation, and was awarded various patents.

To get Kingfisher started, Bruce developed the ground-breaking KI2000 Optical Light Source and KI020 Optical Talk Set.

In 1988, the business moved to a large garage, further contracts were won, and an Australian Federal R&D Grant was received for early development work on optical power meters, which culminated in the release of the KI6000 series power meters soon afterwards.

In 1991, Kingfisher had grown into its first factory in Rowville. Kingfisher then located to 30 Rocco Drive, Scoresby 3179 from 2001 to May 2015, when it moved to 720 Springvale Road, Mulgrave Victoria 3170.

In 2005, the company had twenty-two employees. The company has always made most of its products in Australia.

== Early Awards and recognition ==
Various industry recognitions include:

- 1993-7 Telecom Australia (now Telstra) Export Endorsement
- 1999 Dun & Bradstreet Export award
- 2002 Governor of the State of Victoria export award
- 2002 Australian exporter of the year national finalist
- 2005 State of Victoria Manufacturing Hall of Fame
- 2005 State of Victoria Photonics Network (VPN) Achievement Award
