= Michael Turner (illustrator) =

British illustrator (1934–2025)

- Born: Geoffrey Michael Turner; 14 March 1934; Harrow, Middlesex, England
- Died: 1 December 2025 (aged 91)
- Known for: Painting

Geoffrey Michael Turner (14 March 1934 – 1 December 2025) was a British illustrator who specialised in motoring and aviation paintings. He is regarded as one of the early examples of such type and one of the most highly regarded. Turner had racing drivers, teams, sponsors, pilots, motor and aircraft manufacturers, R.A.F. (Royal Air Force) and Army messes, museums and private collections on his client lists and has hosted a number of solo shows all over the world, plus other specialist shows.

== Early life and career ==
Turner was born and grew up in the suburbs of Harrow, Middlesex. During the Second World War, he became interested in aviation and aeroplanes of the Royal Air Force and drew aircraft in his school exercise books which infuriated his teachers. After the war, Turner developed an interest in motoring and motorsport when, during his family holiday to the Isle of Man in 1947, they attended the British Empire Trophy Race.

After leaving school, Turner attended an art college, followed by national service with the Royal Electrical and Mechanical Engineers for two years. His first job after national service was with a London advertising studio, and he turned freelance in 1957. Turner's artworks were shown regularly on the wall of the Steering Wheel Club in London and many of these illustrations appeared on magazine and book covers.

In the 1960s, Turner started his own company, 'Studio 88', to publish his aviation and motor racing prints, as well as his annual set of Christmas Cards that became popular with enthusiasts. He was commissioned by organisers to create official posters for notable motorsport events such as 24 Hours of Le Mans, 12 Hours of Sebring, a number of Formula One races and many others that took place in notable circuits such as Nürburgring. He was notable in the United States for his poster works for races that took place in Watkins Glen between 1969 and 1980, and created posters for its United States Grand Prix East races.

Turner was involved with the Can-Am series and had ties with the McLaren team, becoming friends with its drivers, Denny Hulme and Bruce McLaren. He was responsible for the design of the bodywork of the race winning McLaren M1B and designed the team logo as well as designing the colour scheme for its first Formula One car of the 1966 season. That colour scheme was short-lived, as prior to the Monaco Grand Prix, the car's livery had to be changed when it was chosen by the producers of the film Grand Prix to be the lead car of the 'Yamura' team. The colour scheme was changed to team's white and blue, resembling that of Honda.

Turner held exhibitions of his art at Halton House in 2005 and 2006.

Turner was a founder member of The Guild of Aviation Artists, was chairman twice and was later President, and was an honorary fellow of the Guild of Motoring Artists.

Turner was involved with the Red Arrows, and flew with them in the past. He counted racing drivers, teams, sponsors, pilots, motor and aircraft manufacturers, R.A.F. and Army messes, museums and private collections in his client list and hosted a number of solo shows all over the world, plus other specialist shows. His artwork appeared on the packaging of Airfix models. Turner had six books of his works published.

== Personal life and death ==
In 1960, Turner married Helen, and together they went on to have three children. He was licensed to fly a private aircraft, and flew his privately owned De Havilland Canada DHC-1 Chipmunk aircraft in his spare time. Helen died in 2023.

Turner died at home following a skin cancer battle, on 1 December 2025, at the age of 91.

== Published works ==
- La Vie D’un Mécanicien (illustrations, with Melville Wallace, 1979)
- Luftwaffe Aircraft (illustrations, with Francis Mason, 1981)
- La Vie Des Pilotes De Course de 1919 á 1939 (1983)
- Formula One: The Cars and the Drivers (with Nigel Roebuck, 1983)
- La Vie Des Pilotes De Courses (illustrations, with Pierre Dumont, 1983)
- Royal Air Force: The Aircraft in Service since 1918 (illustrations, 1986)
- The Aviation Art of Michael Turner (1994)
- Grand Prix De Monaco through the eyes of Michael Turner, (text by David Waldron, 1995)
- The Motorsport Art of Michael Turner (1996)
- Drawing and Painting Racing Cars (1999)
