= Leonard Monteagle Barlow =

British flying ace

- Born: 5 June 1898; Islington, London, England
- Died: 5 February 1918 (aged 19); Martlesham Heath, Suffolk, England
- Military career
- Allegiance: United Kingdom
- Branch: Aviation
- Rank: Lieutenant
- Unit: No. 56 Squadron RFC
- Awards: Military Cross & Two Bars

Lieutenant Leonard Monteagle Barlow MC & Two Bars (5 June 1898 – 5 February 1918) was a British World War I flying ace. He was born in Islington, London and studied electrical engineering prior to joining the Royal Flying Corps.

Barlow was posted to No. 56 Squadron and scored 20 victories whilst serving with the squadron, being awarded the Military Cross three times for his outstanding airmanship and bravery.

Dubbed 'The Gadget King', due to his inventiveness, Barlow developed an ingenious way of firing both of his SE5a aircraft's machine guns at the same time. On 25 September he claimed 3 Albatros fighters of Jasta 10, Lt. Weigand and Uzz. Werkmeister being killed and one other pilot wounded.

On 5 February 1918, Barlow was killed at Martlesham Heath whilst test flying a Sopwith Dolphin which broke up in mid air.

His final tally consisted of 12 and 1 shared destroyed, 6 and 1 shared 'out of control'.

He is buried at Bandon Hill Cemetery, Plot F.85

== Honours and awards ==
- 25 August 1917 – 2nd Lieutenant Leonard Monteagle Barlow, MC, RFC, Special Reserve is awarded the Military Cross:

For conspicuous gallantry and devotion to duty when engaged in aerial combats. He has set a very fine example of courage and dash in attacking and destroying hostile machines. He also attacked and stopped a goods train, silenced a machine gun on an enemy aerodrome, and dispersed troops on the roads from a very low altitude.

— London Gazette

- 16 October 1917 – 2nd Lieutenant Leonard Monteagle Barlow, MC, RFC, Special Reserve is awarded a bar to the Military Cross:

For conspicuous gallantry and devotion to duty in aerial combats over a considerable period, during the course of which he destroyed six enemy machines and drown three out of control. He has taken part in over sixty-offensive patrols, of which he led ten. His gallantry and skill have been most marked and consistent.

— London Gazette

- 27 October 1917 – Lieutenant Leonard Monteagle Barlow, MC, RFC, Special Reserve Canadian Force is awarded a second bar the Military Cross.

For conspicuous gallantry and devotion to duty in aerial combats. In the course of a fortnight he destroyed several enemy machines; one occasion he attacked four enemy scouts and shot one down in flames and two others, which were seen to crash. He showed the greatest gallantry dash and skill

— London Gazette
