= Clifford Paterson Medal and Prize =

Institute of Physics award

- Sponsored by: Institute of Physics
- Rewards: Bronze medal, £1000
- First award: 1981
- Website: http://www.iop.org/about/awards/

The Clifford Paterson Medal and Prize is awarded by the Institute of Physics. It was established in 1981 and named after Clifford Copland Paterson. The prize is awarded each year for exceptional early career contributions to the application of physics in an industrial or commercial context. The medal is bronze and is accompanied by a prize of £1000 and a certificate.

== Recipients ==
List of medallists:

- 2026 Benjamin Dawson
- 2025 Andrew Lamb, Jonathan Winch and Benjamin Adams
- 2023 Alasdair Price and Euan Allen
- 2022 Elena Boto, Niall Holmes and Ryan M. Hill
- 2021 Ying Lia Li
- 2020 Kirk Duroe
- 2019 Richard Theodore Grant, Shima Ghasemi, and Abbas Al Shimary
- 2018 Richard Bowman
- 2017 Ceri Brenner
- 2016 Malte Gather
- 2015 Edmund Kelleher
- 2014 Sarah Bohndiek
- 2013 Ian Chapman
- 2012 Henry Snaith
- 2011 Jochen Guck
- 2010 Stefan Maier
- 2009 Rachel McKendry
- 2008 Russell Cowburn
- 2007 Kurt Haselwimmer
- 2006 Timothy Leighton
- 2005 Jonathan Mark Huntley
- 2004 Ian Stuart Gilmore
- 2003 Colin David Cameron, Christopher William Slinger and Maurice Stanely
- 2002 Polina Bayvel
- 2001 Joseph Louis Keddie
- 2000 Hugh Francis Joseph Cormican
- 1999 Thomas Grierson Harvey
- 1998 Neil Loxley
- 1997 Charles Thomas Elliott and Timothy Ashley
- 1996 Michael Roy Worboys
- 1995 Gerard Sherlock
- 1994 Robert William Musk
- 1993 Anthony Keith Laurence Dymoke-Bradshaw and Jonathan David Hares
- 1992 Michael David May
- 1991 Paul F Fewster
- 1990 John David Garratt
- 1989 Michael J Kelly
- 1988 Martin John Powell
- 1987 Andrew Cannon Carter
- 1986 Edward Peter Raynes
- 1985 Colin Edwin Conisbee Wood
- 1984 Ian Alexander Shanks
- 1983 John Martin Shannon

== See also ==
- Institute of Physics Awards
- List of physics awards
- List of awards named after people
