= John Edwin Midwinter =

British electrical engineer (1938–2021)

Professor John Edwin Midwinter OBE FRS FREng
- Born: 8 March 1938; Newbury, Berkshire, England
- Died: 13 November 2021 (aged 83); Ipswich, Suffolk, England
- Education: KCL, UK
- Known for: Optical Communications
- Awards: IET Faraday Medal (1997); IET JJ Thomson Medal (1987); Clifford Paterson Medal (1983); FRS (1985); FREng (1984)
- Scientific career
- Fields: Optical communications
- Workplaces: University College London, UK; IET, UK

John Edwin Midwinter (8 March 1938 – 13 November 2021) was a British electrical engineer and professor, who was President of the Institution of Electrical Engineers (now IET) from 2000 to 2001.

== Education ==
He was educated at St Bartholomew's School, King's College London (BSc Physics, 1961) and the University of London (PhD, 1968).

== Career ==
From the 1970s, John's research centred on optical fibre communications, and he led the speedy deployment of optical communications infrastructure in the UK while at British Telecom. He was subsequently the BT Professor of Optoelectronics at University College London from 1984 to 1991 and Pender Professor of Electronic Engineering from 1991 to 2004, and was Vice Provost from 1994 to 1999. He was subsequently made an Emeritus Professor there. He was also a member of the Parliamentary Office of Science & Technology Advisory Board. He was President of IEE (now IET) UK in 2000.

== Awards ==
He was made an OBE and elected to Fellow of the Royal Academy of Engineering in 1984 and a Fellow of the Royal Society in 1985. He delivered the Clifford Paterson Lecture of the Royal Society in 1983 and was awarded the IEE JJ Thomson Medal in 1987 and the Faraday Medal of the Institution of Electrical Engineers in 1997. He was awarded Honorary Doctorates from Nottingham University in 2000, Loughborough University in 2001 & Queens University Belfast in 2004, UK. In 2000 he presented the Bernard Price Memorial Lecture. In 2002, he was awarded the IEEE Eric E. Sumner Award.

== Personal life ==
Midwinter died on 13 November 2021, at the age of 83.

== Books ==
- Zernike, F.; Midwinter, J.E. (2006) [1973]. Applied Nonlinear Optics. Dover Publications. ISBN 978-0-48-645360-6.
- Midwinter, J.E. (1979). Optical fibers for transmission. Wiley. ISBN 978-0-47-160240-8.
