= Garry Rumbles =

Garry Rumbles is a British chemist and researcher at CU-Boulder. He is a fellow of the Royal Society of Chemistry and has written more than 130 journal articles.

He has an h-index of 67.
