= Eleanor Stride =

Professor of Biomaterials

- Education: University College London
- Awards: Institution of Engineering and Technology Harvey Prize (2015) Philip Leverhulme Prize (2009)
- Scientific career
- Workplaces: University College London; University of Oxford
- Doctoral advisor: Nader Saffari

Eleanor Phoebe Jane Stride is a British biomedical engineer who is a professor of Biomaterials at St Catherine's College, Oxford. Stride engineers drug delivery systems using carefully designed microbubbles and studies how they can be used in diagnostics.

== Education ==
Stride completed her Bachelor's degree in Mechanical Engineering and a PhD in the Ultrasonics group at University College London. She had planned to work for Aston Martin, but whilst at UCL she became interested in using ultrasound for imaging microbubbles, and was awarded a Royal Society Brian Mercer Innovation Feasibility Award.

== Research and career ==
Stride was awarded a Royal Academy of Engineering lectureship at University College London, where she explored ultrasound for drug delivery. Microbubbles in the bloodstream created a strong ultrasound echo, which allows doctors to trace where the blood is flowing. Whilst at University College London she collaborated with the Wellcome Collection. She was awarded an Engineering and Physical Sciences Research Council Challenging Engineering Award in 2011. That year she joined the Oxford Institute of Biomedical Engineering in 2011. She is a Fellow at St Catherine's College, Oxford. The award allowed her to develop new agents for targeted drug delivery, which allowed clinicians more control in transporting and releasing medical therapeutics. Stride encapsulates deactivated drugs in 'carriers' which can be navigated around the body to a target. She also explored how her novel agents interacted with cells and tissue. Her research could be used to deliver chemotherapy. She has several patents for the creation and imaging of microbubbles. She created the spin-out company AtoCap. AtoCap focussed on the treatment of chronic infections.

Stride was appointed full Professor in 2014. By using custom-designed magnetic arrays, the Stride group have managed to trap particles in tissue several centimetres deep. She demonstrated that it is possible to load oxygen into microbubbles to improve Sonodynamic therapy. She was made a Fellow of the Royal Academy of Engineering in 2017.

=== Public engagement and diversity ===
In 2016, Stride was named one of the Top 50 Influential Women in Engineering. She has appeared on BBC Radio 4. She features on a number of YouTube videos with the Royal Institution. She created a revision series with BBC bitesize.

=== Awards ===
- 2009: Philip Leverhulme Prize
- 2009: EPSRC & Journal of the Royal Society Interface Award (recognition of best paper 2004 - 2009)
- 2009: SET for Britain Engineering medal
- 2010: Worshipful Company of Armourers and Brasiers Venture Prize
- 2013: Acoustical Society of America Lindsay Award
- 2015: Institution of Engineering and Technology Harvey Prize
- 2017: Fellow of the Royal Academy of Engineering

Stride was appointed Officer of the Order of the British Empire (OBE) in the 2021 New Year Honours for services to engineering.
