= Benny D. Freeman =

American chemical engineer and professor (1961–)

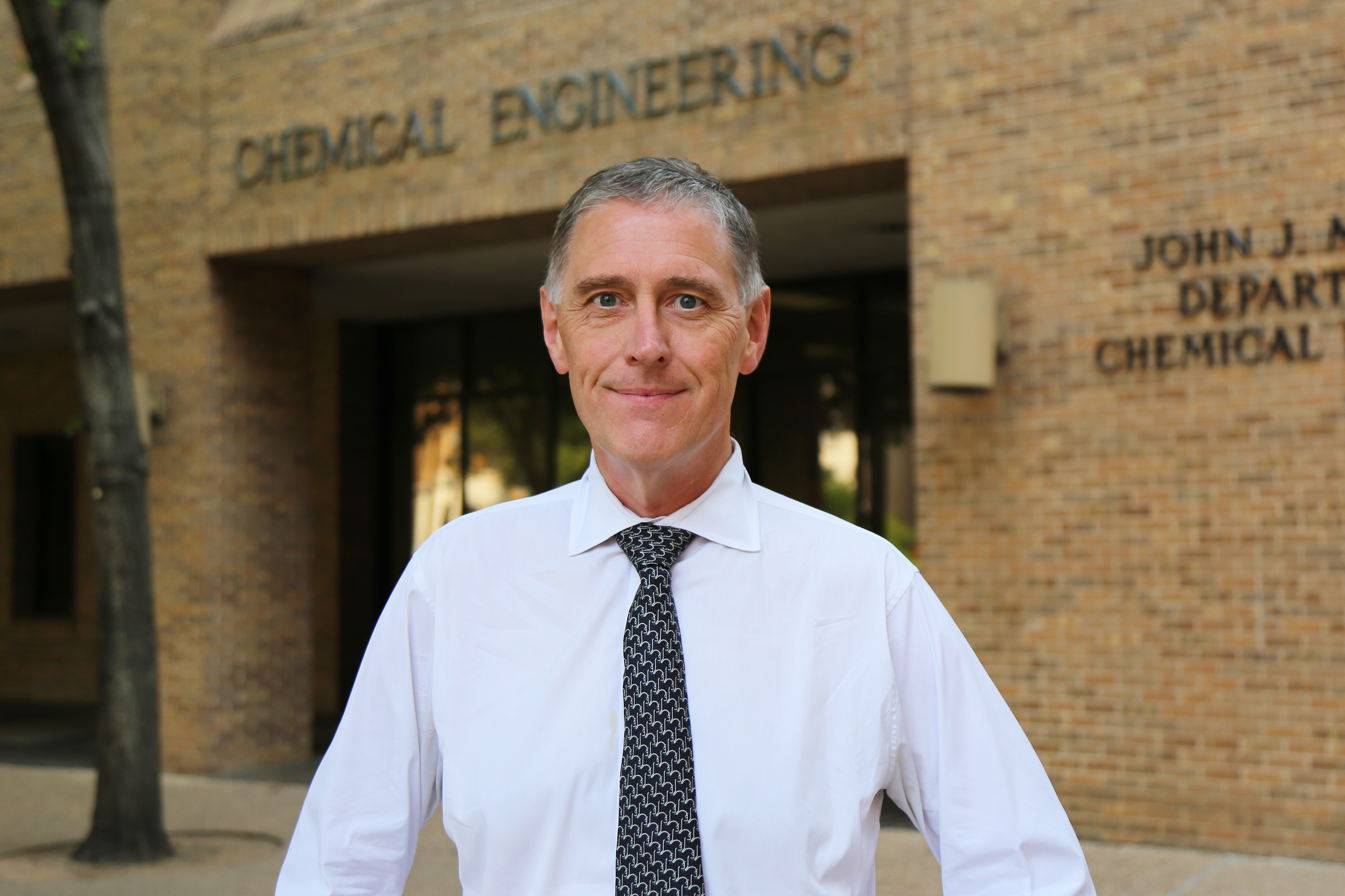
- Born: 29 April 1961 (age 65); Hendersonville, NC
- Education: UC, Berkeley (Ph.D), NC State (B.S.)
- Known for: gas, vapor, and liquid solubility, diffusion and permeability in polymers and polymer based materials, membranes, water purification membranes, gas separation membranes, upper bound theory, ion sorption, diffusion, permeation and conduction in water-swollen polymers
- Scientific career
- Fields: chemical engineering, membranes

Benny D. Freeman (born 29 April 1961 in Hendersonville, North Carolina) is a United States chemical engineering professor at The University of Texas at Austin. He received his B.S. in Chemical Engineering from NC State University in 1983 and his Ph.D. in Chemical Engineering from the University of California, Berkeley in 1988. Afterwards, during 1988–89, he served as a NATO Postdoctoral Fellow at the Ecole Supérieure de Physique et de Chimie Industrielles de la Ville de Paris in the Laboratoire Physico-Chimie Structurale et Macromoléculaire, Paris, France. He then returned to his undergraduate Alma Mater, NC State, where he served on the chemical engineering faculty from 1989–2001. In 2001, he moved to The University of Texas at Austin where, today, he serves as the William J. (Bill) Murray Jr. Endowed Chair in Engineering in the chemical engineering department.

== Awards ==
- , Elected to U.S. National Academy of Engineering (2023)
- Reilley Lectureship, University of Notre Dame (2020)
- Membrane Society of Australasia (MSA) Distinguished Scholar Lectureship (2019)
- American Chemical Society POLY/PMSE Plenary Lecture (2019)
- Bird, Stewart, and Lightfoot Lecture, University of Wisconsin (2019)
- North American Membrane Society (NAMS) Fellow (2017)
- Fulbright Distinguished Chair (2016-2017)
- PMSE Distinguished Service Award (from Polymeric Materials: Science and Engineering Division of ACS) (2015)
- World Premier International (WPI) Professor of International Institute for Carbon-Neutral Energy Research (I^{2}CNER) at Kyushu University, Japan (2014-2020)
- AIChE Clarence (Larry) G. Gerhold Award (2013)
- Joe J. King Professional Engineering Achievement Award (2013)
- Society of Plastics Engineers (SPE) International Award (2013)
- ACS Award in Applied Polymer Science (2009)
- American Institute of Chemical Engineers (AIChE) Institute Award for Excellence in Industrial Gases Technology (2008)
- American Chemical Society (ACS) PMSE Cooperative Research Award (2002)

== Selected publications (from >450) ==
- Greenlee, L.F., B.D. Freeman and D.F. Lawler, “Ozonation of Phosphonate Antiscalants Used for Reverse Osmosis Desalination: Parameter Effects on the Extent of Oxidation,” Chemical Engineering Journal, 244, 505-513 (2014).
- Freeman, B.D., “Basis of Permeability/Selectivity Tradeoff Relations in Polymeric Gas Separation Membranes,” Macromolecules, 32, 375-380 (1999).
- Merkel, T.C., B.D. Freeman, R.J. Spontak, Z. He, I. Pinnau, P. Meakin and A.J. Hill, “Ultrapermeable, Reverse-Selective Nanocomposite Membranes”, Science, 296, 519-522 (2002).
- Merkel, T.C., V.I. Bondar, K. Nagai, B.D. Freeman, and I. Pinnau, “Gas Sorption, Diffusion, and Permeation in Poly(dimethylsiloxane),” Journal of Polymer Science: Part B, Polymer Physics, 38, 415-434 (2000).
- Park, H.B., C.H. Jung, Y.M. Lee, A.J. Hill, S.J. Pas, S.T. Mudie, E. van Wagner, B.D. Freeman, and D.J. Cookson, “Polymers with Cavities Tuned for Fast, Selective Transport of Small Molecules and Ions,” Science, 318, 254-258 (2007).
- Geise, G.M., H.-S. Lee, D.J. Miller, B.D. Freeman, J.E. McGrath, and D.R. Paul, “Water Purification by Membranes: The Role of Polymer Science,” Journal of Polymer Science: Part B. Polymer Physics, 48, 1685-1718 (2010).
- Park, H.B., J. Kamcev, L.M. Robeson, M. Elimelech, and B.D. Freeman, “Maximizing the Right Stuff: The Tradeoff Between Membrane Permeability and Selectivity,” Science, 356(6343), eaab0530 (2017).
- Sanders, D.F., Z.P. Smith, R. Guo, L.M. Robeson, J.E. McGrath, D.R. Paul, and B.D. Freeman, “Energy-Efficient Polymeric Gas Separation Membranes for a Sustainable Future: A Review,” Polymer, 54, 4729-4761 (2013).
- Lin, H., E. van Wagner, B.D. Freeman, L.G. Toy, and R.P. Gupta, “Plasticization-Enhanced H_{2} Purification Using Polymeric Membranes,” Science, 311(5761), 639-642 (2006).
- Geise, G.M., H.B. Park, A.C. Sagle, B.D. Freeman, and J.E. McGrath, “Water Permeability and Water/Salt Selectivity Tradeoff in Polymers for Desalination,” Journal of Membrane Science, 369(1-2), 130-138 (2011).
