= British Amateur Television Club =

British amateur radio organization

- The BATC Logo
- Abbreviation: BATC
- Formation: 1949
- Type: Non-profit organization
- Purpose: Advocacy, Education
- Region served: Global and the UK
- President: David Mann G8ADM
- Main organ: The Committee of the BATC
- Affiliations: Radio Society of Great Britain
- Website: batc.org.uk

The British Amateur Television Club (BATC) is the world's largest television technology club; it has members in the UK and all around the world and is a non-profit making club run by an elected committee of volunteers for the benefit of its members. Membership is open to all who are interested in television, amateur or professional, indeed the club has many members who work for major broadcasting companies.

== CQ-TV ==
The club's magazine, CQ-TV, is published four times a year and is sent free of charge to BATC members. It is A4 size and has up to 50 pages and it is now in its 7th decade of publication. Available in full colour in paper or cyber form, as a PDF. Articles cover the full range of television interests from HD to Slowscan and Studios to Transmitting. Educational and construction projects are a feature of most issues and a full archive of past issues of CQ-TV is available on the BATC Website.

== The BATC in today’s world ==
The objectives of the BATC are to encourage and co-ordinate the activities of amateurs involved in all aspects of television. The BATC liaises with the RSGB and other international ATV organisations and is represented at international policy making conferences. The club organises meetings devoted to ATV as well as attending numerous radio meetings around the UK. The BATC fully embraces the Internet, with a web site, Wiki, Forum and an RSS news feed. The club runs various ATV contests throughout the year for fixed and portable stations and, there is an International ATV contest, organised each year by a different member country of the IARU.

== The History of the BATC ==
The BATC was founded in 1949. The first committee was formed and the publication of CQ-TV started, the world’s first magazine for amateur television transmission. In the early days of the club, members constructed their own cameras, televisions and transmitters. As early as 1954 members transmitted colour signals over a 13-mile path, establishing what is believed to be a record. The BATC were (and still are) instrumental in the development of the repeater network in the UK and the rest of the world. One of the major projects was the development of a repeater control system using a purpose designed microprocessor. The BATC is affiliated to the Radio Society of Great Britain and has frequent contact with other ATV organisations.

== The Future of the BATC ==
This encoder has a number of modes and offers reduced bandwidth signals for the crowded amateur bands. A new BATC forum service has just been introduced and is live now on Forum Link. It is thought that this will become the premier forum for news, help and exchange of TV information. From July 2008 the BATC has started a new video streaming service for the amateur television and radio hobbies.

== Television transmission ==
To send a television picture in colour across a radio link requires at least a camera,

== Membership ==
The Club has adopted digital technologies in its operations, including projects involving digital transmission and reception based on professional SDI standards. It is also working on the implementation of H.264 digital encoding technology.
