= Richard A. Mathies =

American chemist and academic (born 1946)

- Born: Seattle, Washington, U.S.
- Education: University of Washington; Cornell University
- Known for: Femtosecond stimulated Raman spectroscopy (FSRS); DNA sequencing technology Microfluidic analytical systems
- Awards: Ellis R. Lippincott Award; ACS Award in Chemical Instrumentation; Fellow of the National Academy of Inventors
- Scientific career
- Fields: Physical chemistry; Bioanalytical chemistry; Spectroscopy
- Workplaces: University of California, Berkeley

Richard A. Mathies (born September 1946) is an American chemist and academic known for his contributions to physical chemistry, bioanalytical chemistry, ultrafast vibrational spectroscopy, microfluidic analytical systems, and biotechnology innovation. He is Professor Emeritus of Chemistry at the University of California, Berkeley and served as its Dean of the College of Chemistry from 2008 to 2013.

== Early life and education ==
Mathies was born in Seattle, Washington. He earned a Bachelor of Science in Chemistry from the University of Washington in 1968 and completed his graduate studies at Cornell University, receiving an M.S. in Physical Chemistry in 1970 and a Ph.D. in Physical Chemistry in 1974.

Following his doctorate, he was awarded a Helen Hay Whitney Postdoctoral Fellowship and conducted postdoctoral research at Yale University from 1973 to 1976.

== Academic career ==
Mathies joined the faculty of the University of California, Berkeley in 1976 as an assistant professor of chemistry. He was promoted to associate professor in 1982 and to full professor in 1986. In 2008, he was appointed the G. N. Lewis professor of chemistry and served as the dean of the college of chemistry until 2013.

After stepping down as dean, he continued his academic service as professor of the graduate school and became an emeritus professor in 2013. He has also served as a senior fellow at Space Sciences Laboratory (SSL).

== Research ==
=== Ultrafast vibrational spectroscopy ===
Mathies is widely recognized for pioneering work in resonance Raman spectroscopy and for developing Femtosecond Stimulated Raman Spectroscopy (FSRS). His research elucidated the primary photochemistry of rhodopsins, demonstrating that "the 11-cis to trans isomerization of the retinal chromophore occurs in approximately 200 femtoseconds, among the fastest photochemical reactions known in nature".

=== Bioanalytical chemistry and genomic analysis ===
In bioanalytical chemistry, Mathies pioneered laser-induced fluorescence detection and microfabricated lab-on-a-chip systems. His laboratory developed the first capillary array electrophoretic DNA sequencing instruments, which enables high-throughput DNA sequencing and contributing to the technological foundation of the Human Genome Project.

=== Biotechnology innovation and patents ===
For many years, inventions arising from his laboratory generated the largest royalty income across the University of California system, reflecting their scientific and commercial impact on genomic sequencing and forensic DNA analysis.

=== Planetary exploration ===
Mathies has led research on compact analytical instruments for planetary exploration. His group developed the Mars Organic Analyzer, a microfabricated capillary electrophoresis system designed to detect trace organic molecules in extraterrestrial environments. These systems were tested in Mars-analog environments such as the Atacama Desert and adapted for proposed missions to the icy moons Enceladus and Europa.

== Honors and awards ==
- Fellow, National Academy of Inventors (2015)
- The American Chemical Society (ACS) Analytical Division Award in Chemical Instrumentation (2010)
- Ellis R. Lippincott Award, Optical Society of America (2004)

== Selected publications ==
- Kukura, P.; McCamant, D. W.; Mathies, R. A. (2007). Femtosecond stimulated Raman spectroscopy. Annual Review of Physical Chemistry.
- Huang, X.; Mathies, R. A. (1992). Capillary array electrophoresis for DNA sequencing. Analytical Chemistry.
- New, J. S.; Mathies, R. A. (2021). Sampling Enceladus plume material for biomarkers. Proceedings of the National Academy of Sciences.
