= Ian Craig (disambiguation) =

Ian Craig (1935–2014) was an Australian cricketer.

Ian Craig may also refer to:

- Ian Craig (English cricketer) (1931–2015)
- Ian Craig (footballer) (1952–1982)
- Ian Craig (engineer), South African engineer
- Ian William Craig (born 1980), Canadian musician
- Ian Craig (athlete) in Athletics at the 1998 Commonwealth Games – Men's 100 metres
- Iain Craig in the 2015 World Senior Curling Championships – Men's tournament
- Ian Craig, a character in This Man Craig
