= Corex (disambiguation) =

Corex may refer to:

- Corex, a cough medicine
- Corex Process, a metal smelter configuration
- Corex (geological analysis), a defunct provider of analysis services to the petroleum industry
- Corex, in Greek mythology, one of the sons of Coronus
- Corex, a steel-making plant owned by Mittal Steel South Africa
- Corex D filter, a product of Taeyeong I&T
- A common misspelling of the corrugated plastic material Correx used in sign making
