= Corax =

Corax can refer to:

== Biology ==
- corax, the scientific species name of the common raven (Corvus corax)
- corax, a species name
- Corax, the former name of a genus of fossil sharks, Squalicorax

== People ==
- Corax (mythology), a legendary king of Sicyon
- Corax of Syracuse, one of the founders of Greek rhetoric
- Predrag Koraksić Corax, political cartoonist from Serbia
- Janne Corax (born 1967), Swedish cyclist

=== Fictional people ===
- Corax, central character in The Gospel of Corax, 1996 Paul Park novel
- Corvus Corax, Primarch of the Raven Guard Legion in the universe of Warhammer 40,000

== Other uses ==
- BAE Systems Corax (also known as the 'Raven'), a British experimental unmanned aerial vehicle developed in 2004
- "Corax", abbreviation of corporate action in the realm of corporate finance

== See also ==
- Including use as a species name
- Corex cough syrup
