= Thomas P. Stratten =

South African engineer

Thomas Price Stratten
- Born: 4 June 1904; Kimberley, Cape Colony
- Education: University of Cape Town
- Alma mater: Balliol College, Oxford
- Spouse: Mary Adele Morris
- Children: Peter, Thomas and Mary
- Scientific career
- Institutions: Iscor; Eskom; SAPPI; Union Corporation

Thomas Price Stratten (born June 4, 1904) was a South African engineer. He went to Oxford on a Rhodes Scholarship, followed by two years at American General Electric. He returned to South Africa in 1929 to the position of assistant electrical engineer at De Beers Consolidated Mines. He took senior positions at Iscor, the Union Corporation and Escom. After a time spent in the Directorate of War Supplies, he went on to successfully expand SAPPI's operations and was president of the South African Institute of Electrical Engineers during the 1940s.

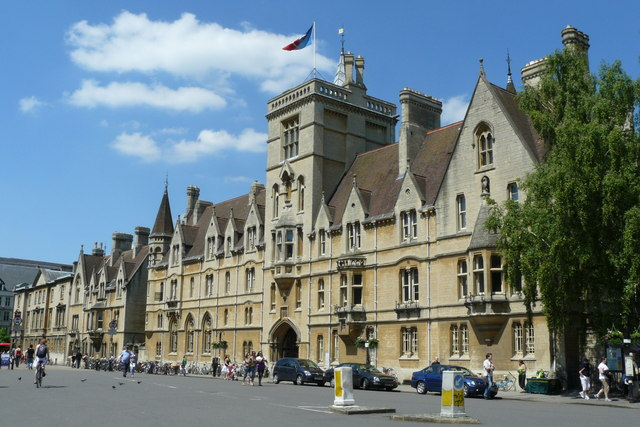
Balliol College, Oxford

== Education and career ==
Stratten was born in 1904 in Kimberley, Cape Colony. He completed a BSc (Engineering) at the University of Cape Town in 1923. He then went to Oxford on a Rhodes Scholarship where he completed his MA (Engineering) at Balliol College. He worked for two years at American General Electric and then returned to South Africa in 1929 to the position of assistant electrical engineer at De Beers Consolidated Mines.

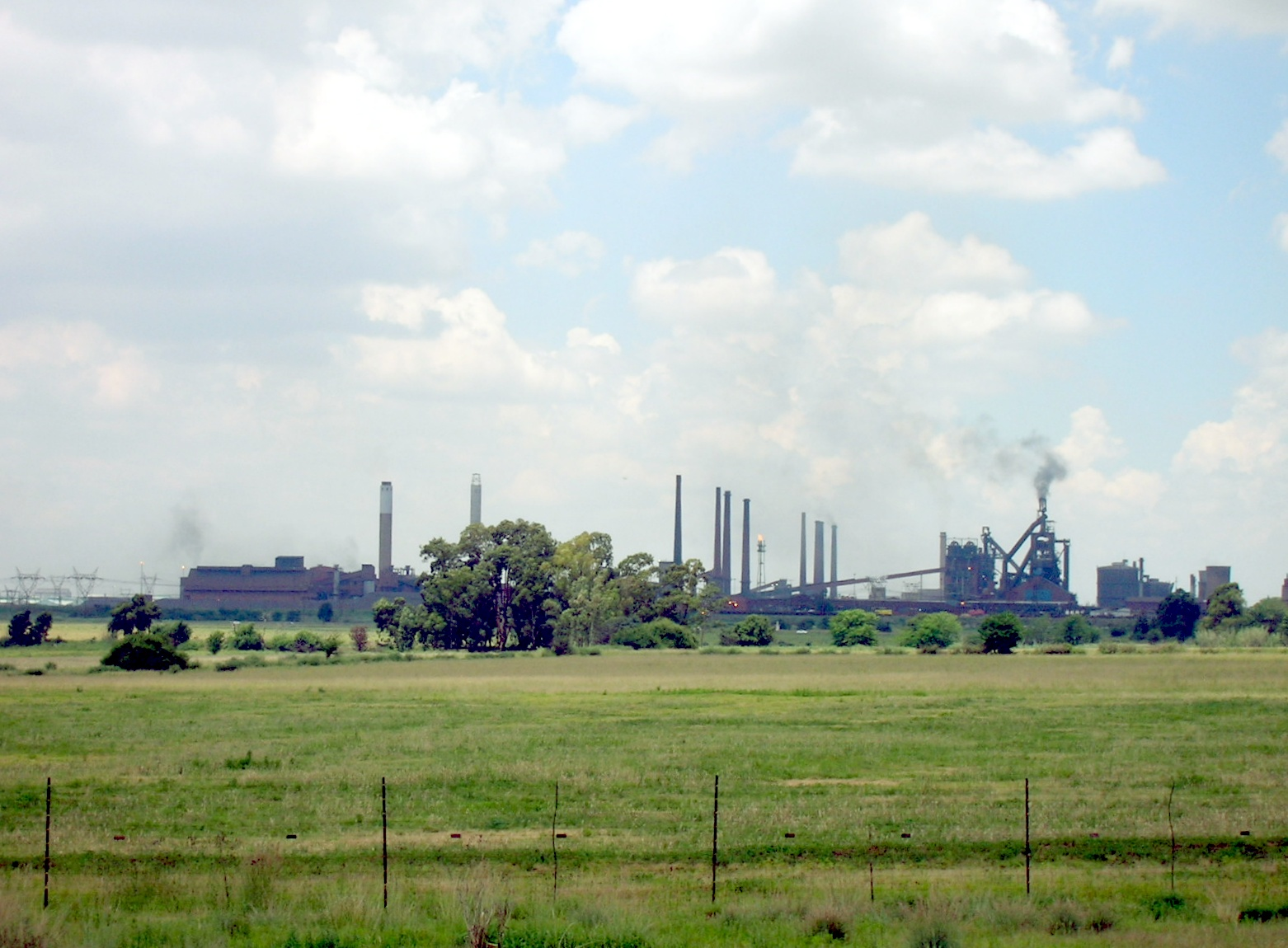
Steel Mill at Vanderbijlpark

From 1931 to 1935 he was appointed chief electrical engineer at Iscor. In 1935 he moved to the Union Corporation (UC). He was appointed to several senior positions during his time at UC, including Chairman of the Board of Kinross, Bracken, East Geduld, Grootvlei, Leslie and other gold mines. He was Managing Director from 1954 and Chairman of UC from 1962 to 1972, after which time he retired.

During the Second World War, General Jan Smuts' government appointed Stratten Head of Technical Production of the Directorate of War Supplies.

In 1962 he was seconded to South African Pulp and Paper Industries Ltd (SAPPI), where he was instrumental in the successful expansion of their operations.

In 1963 he was seconded to the Electricity Supply Commission (Escom) (the predecessor of Eskom) where he stayed until 1969.

From 1 September 1964, Stratten was appointed to the National Finance Corporation (a subsidiary of the South African Reserve Bank from 1949 to 1984), to represent the mining industry.

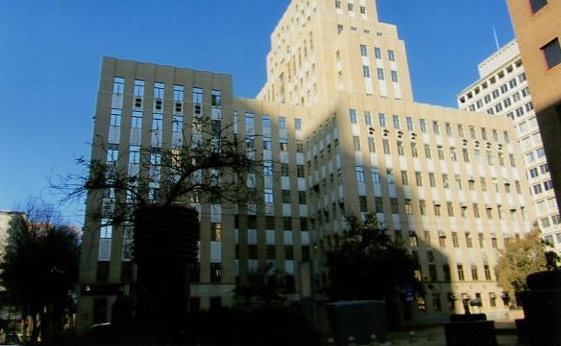
Chamber of Mines Building, Johannesburg

== Recognition, memberships, presentations ==
- Stratten was a member of the South African Institute of Electrical Engineers (SAIEE)
- He was an associate of the Scientific and Technical Society of South Africa.
- Stratten was a member of the first council of the Council for Scientific and Industrial Research (CSIR) in 1945.
- Stratten was a founding member of the Oppenheimer Memorial Trust.
- In 1964 he presented the Hendrik van der Bijl lecture at the South African Academy of Engineering, as a representative of the Chamber of Mines.
- In 1966 he was presented with an Honorary Doctor of Laws degree from the University of the Witwatersrand at special graduation ceremony celebrating the 80th anniversary of the City of Johannesburg and the 70th anniversary of the South African School of Mines (predecessor of the University of the Witwatersrand).
- The TP Stratten Primary school in Evander, Mpumalanga is named after him.

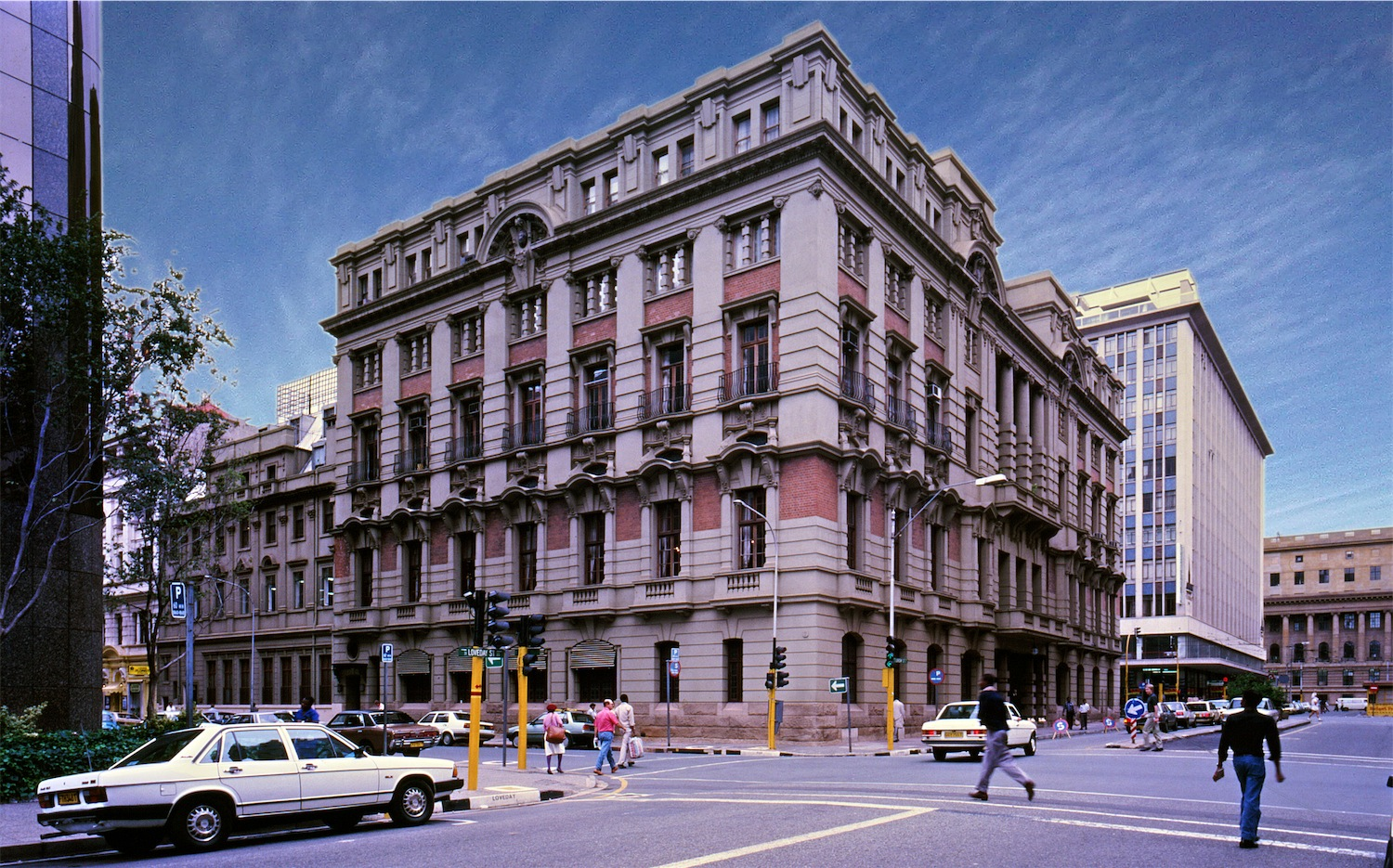
The Rand Club, Johannesburg

== Personal life ==
Stratten married Mary Adele Morris in 1930 and they had three children, Peter, Thomas and Mary. He was a member of the Rand Club, The Johannesburg Country Club and The Royal Johannesburg Golf club and had a home in Westcliff, Johannesburg.

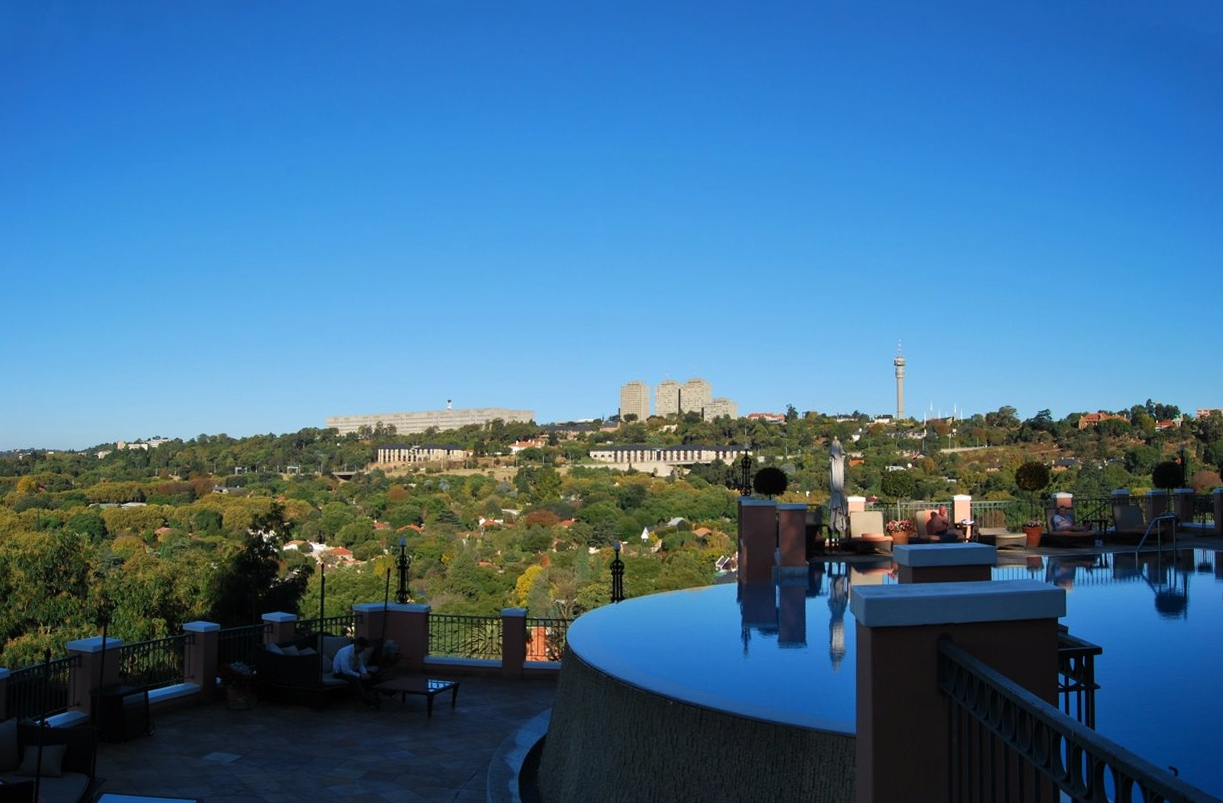
View to the north from the Westcliff hotel

== See also ==
- South African Institute of Electrical Engineers
