= Iscor =

ISCOR may refer to:

- Mittal Steel South Africa, formerly known as ISCOR
- The Institute for International Security and Conflict Resolution at San Diego State University in San Diego, California
