= Saldanha Steel =

South African steel company

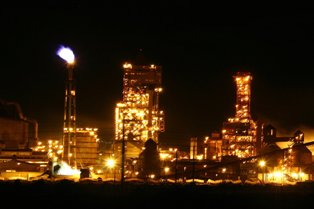
Mittal Steel at Saldanha

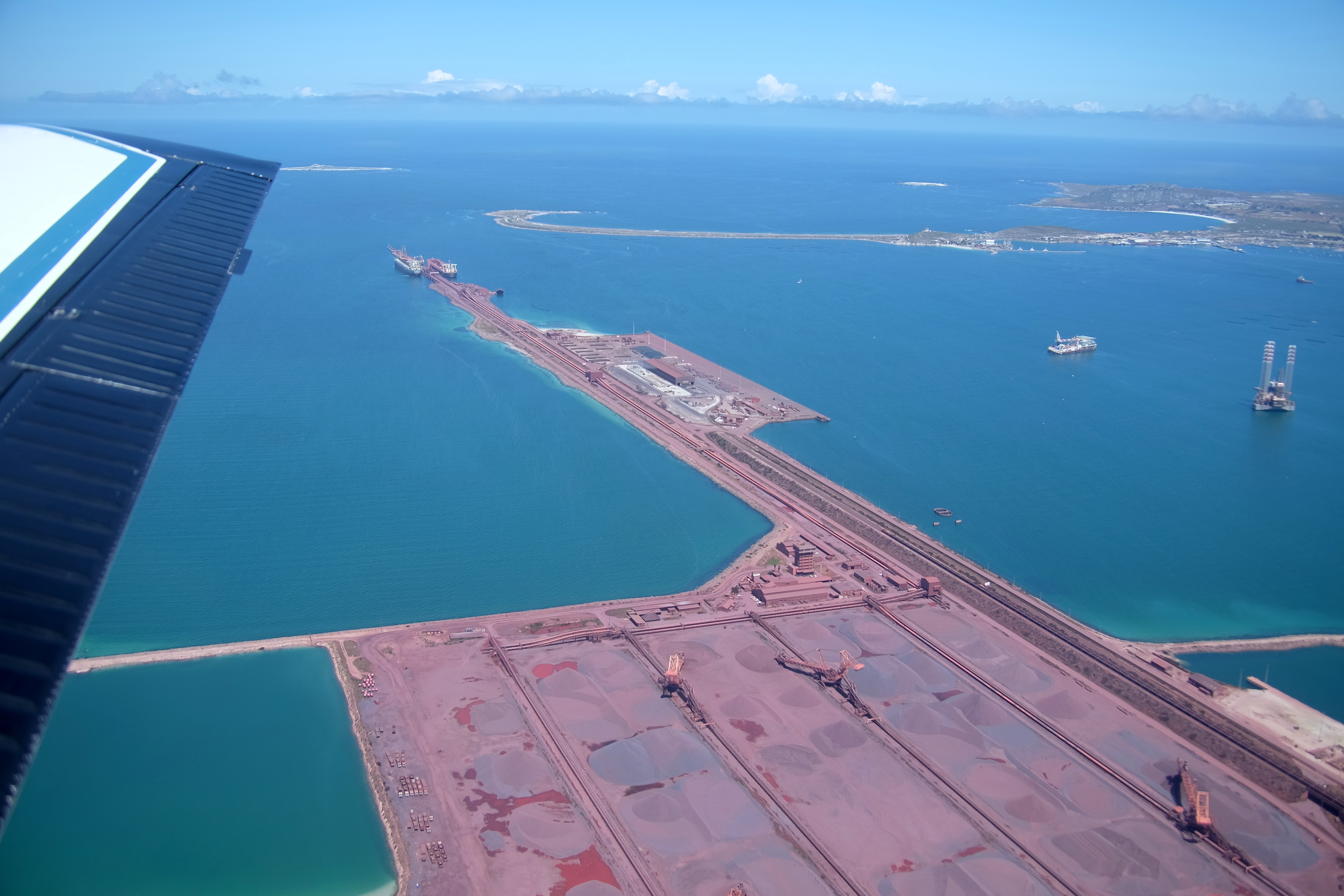
Saldanha Iron Ore Harbor (2016)

Saldanha Steel was a South African steel company originally formed as a partnership between Iscor Limited and the Industrial Development Corporation (IDC). Saldanha Steel is now part of ArcelorMittal South Africa, which in turn is part of global steel company ArcelorMittal. The mill was shut down and mothballed in 2020 resulting in the loss of 1500 jobs.

== Operations ==
The R6,8bn Saldanha Steel facilities, situated on the Cape west coast roughly 10 km away from Langebaan Lagoon's ecologically sensitive wetlands, has been designed to produce 1.25 million tons of hot-rolled carbon steel coil per year. The mill was commissioned in 1998.

Following the unbundling of Iscor's mining and steel assets, the Industrial Development Corp. has now become a major shareholder of Iscor Ltd.

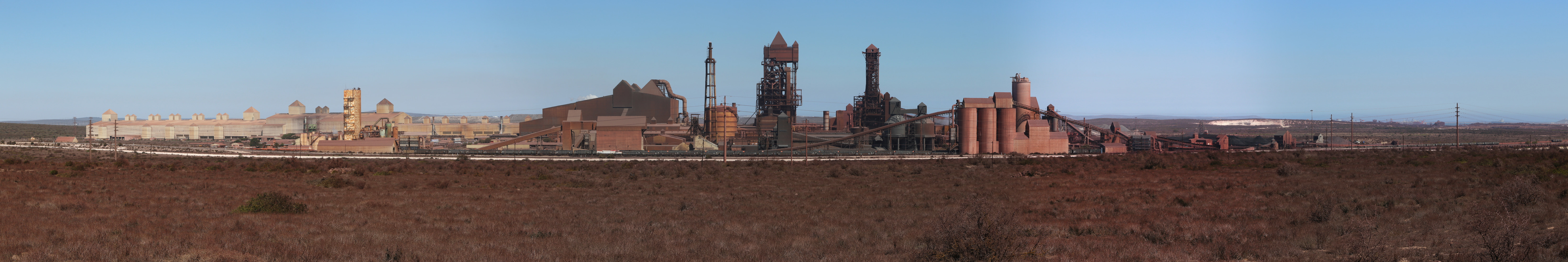
An overview of the ArcelorMittal steel works from the view point.

It is one of the few steel making plants which do not use blast furnaces and coke. The factory comprises the process parts (right to left on image above when scrolled)

- Ore storage and processing in the large silos
- Midrex process in the smaller tower. Iron oxide in lump and pellet form is reduced using purified Corex off-gas. The Corex gas is processed in a Vacuum Pressure Swing Adsorption (VPSA) plant to remove the carbon dioxide and water (products of reduction) to produce reduction gas for the Midrex process. This Midrex plant differs from conventional Midrex plants as it does not use reformed natural gas but purified Corex gas as reduction medium.
- Corex Process in the large tower with the pyramid. The process uses iron oxide in lump and pellet form with coal and coke to produce liquid iron. The coal and coke is gasified to produce a reducing gas (carbon monoxide and hydrogen) that reduces the iron oxide before it is melted to produce liquid iron.
- Flaring off the excess reduction gas, which cannot be used anymore for energy, in the flare stack left of the Corex tower
- Meltshop, the building left of the flare stack, consists of Conarc for melting the iron products again from the Corex and Midrex processes. The Conarc consists of two electric arc furnace shells with one set of electrodes for arcing and one top lance for oxygen blowing. It combines conventional electric arc furnace (EAF) with basic oxygen furnace (BOF) operation.
- Sheet rolling facility in the fairy like building left with all the pyramids. Starting with hot rolling of slabs up to 90 cm wide and 7.5 cm thickness, finally to one millimeter thin sheet rolls which are stored in the very left of the building and shipped to the customer. A temper mill facility is available to temper the coils or to split coils into smaller coils.
- The tall tower in front of the rolling mill building is an Air Liquide air separation plant to elemental oxygen, nitrogen and argon.
