= Evolutionary Studies Institute =

Research institute in South Africa

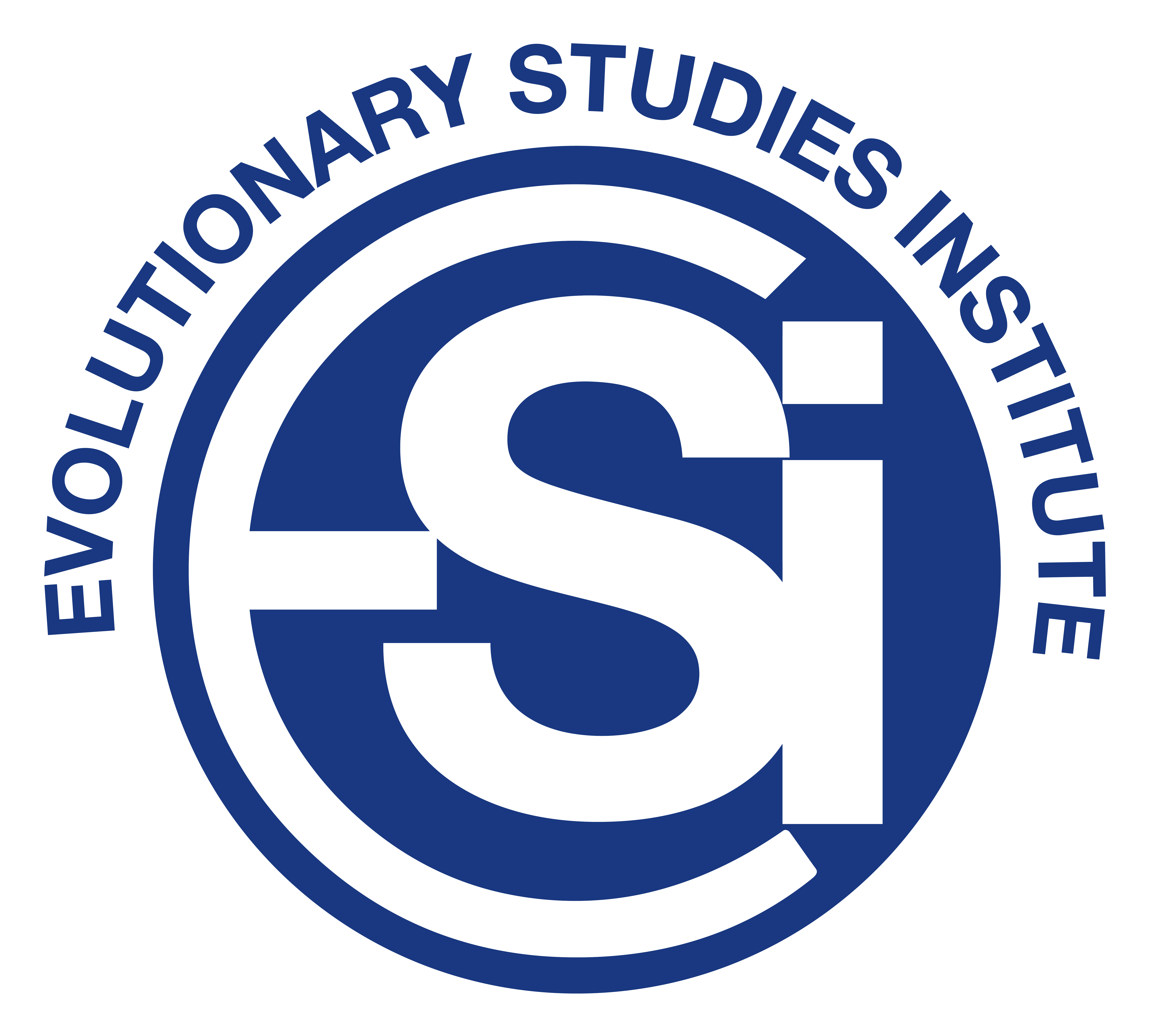
- Established: 1945; 81 years ago
- Location: Johannesburg, South Africa
- Coordinates: 26.193°S 28.0291°E
- Website: www.wits.ac.za/esi/

The Evolutionary Studies Institute (ESI) is a paleontological, paleoanthropological and archeological research institute operated through the Faculty of Science of the University of the Witwatersrand, Johannesburg, South Africa. Previously known as the Bernard Price Institute for Palaeontological Research (BPI) it was renamed the Evolutionary Studies Institute in 2013 to better showcase the scope of its research.

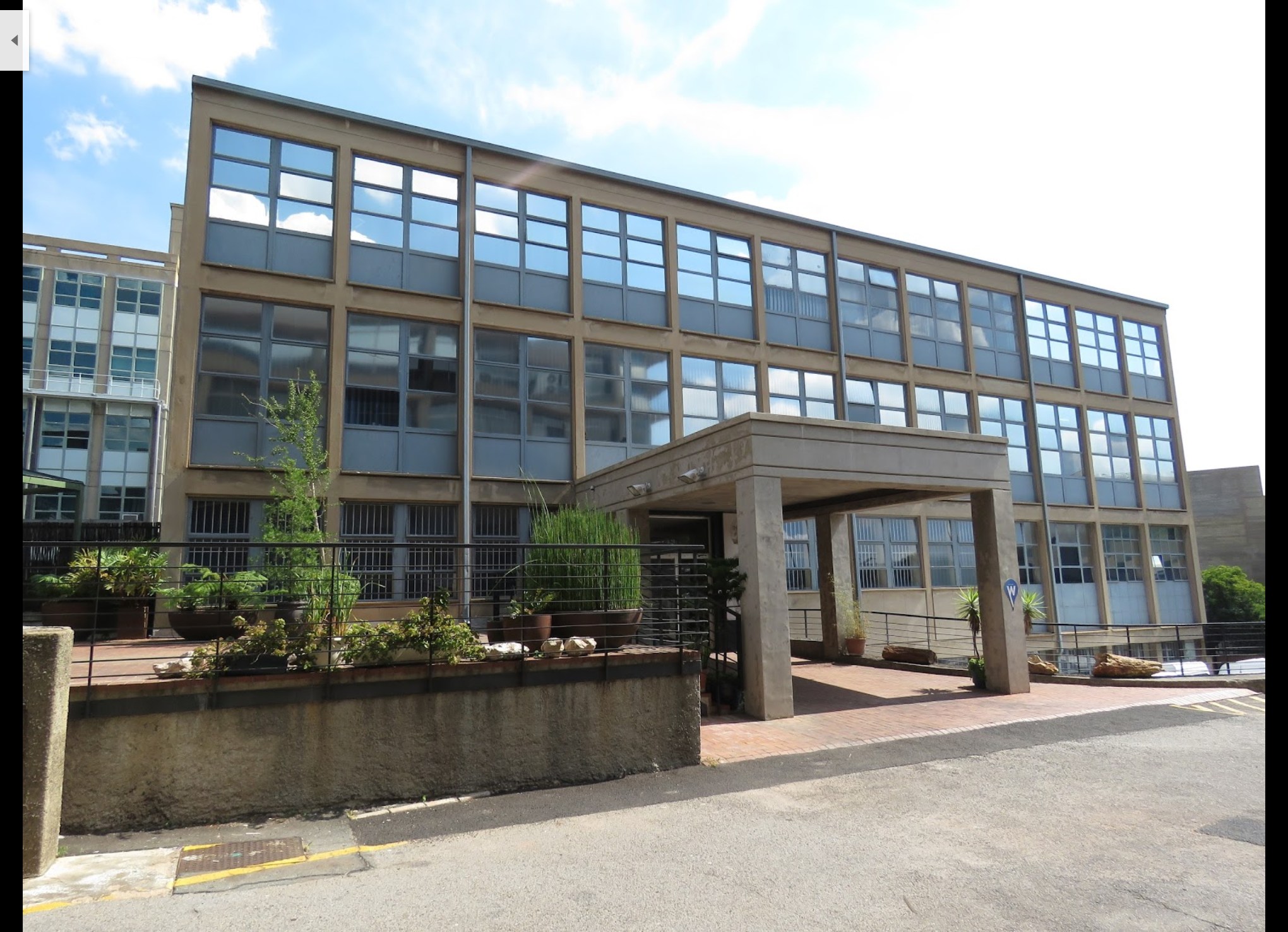
Current premises of the Evolutionary Studies Institute, University of Witwatersrand, Johannesburg, South Africa

== History ==
The Evolutionary Studies Institute was first named the Bernard Price Institute after Bernard Price, an engineer and general manager of the Victoria Falls and Transvaal Power Company who provided steady research funding. The institute was set up in 1937 as an institute for geophysical research, but since has become known for its paleontological research. The institute's first director was Basil Schonland. When World War II began in 1939, the South African Defense Force ordered the BPI to contribute to the war effort. Schonland led the development of South Africa's first radar system during this time.

At the end of the war in 1945, the research focus of the Bernard Price Institute changed to paleontology. This was entirely due to the actions of a well-known Scottish-born physician and paleontologist, Dr Robert Broom. Broom, who had lived in the small town of Pearston between Graaff-Reinet and Somerset East, had been studying therapsid fossils of the Karoo since the early 1900s. During his time living in the Karoo where he ran his medical practice, Broom befriended C. J. M. "Croonie" Kitching, a quantity surveyor from Nieu-Bethesda, and Sidney H. Haughton, a geologist and paleontologist who lived on the farm, Wellwood, close to town. Haughton regularly invited Broom to his farm where he housed a personal collection of fossils he had recovered from his property. Kitching and his three sons, James, Ben, and Scheepers, regularly joined Broom on field trips around Graaff-Reinet and Nieu-Bethesda collecting fossils. Broom was also close friends with Raymond Dart and had contributed to the discovery and research of hominin fossils, namely of Australopithecus and Paranthropus, that had been recovered from Sterkfontein and Makapansgat.

In 1945 Broom, who was working at the Transvaal Museum in Pretoria at the time, gave a public lecture at the University of the Witwatersrand. During his lecture, Broom informed all in attendance of the plight of South African fossils. Thousands of fossils were being lost every year in South Africa because there were no museums or places of research adequately equipped to store, categorize, and protect fossils that were recovered from the field. Broom stated that an academic premises dedicated to the endeavor of paleontological research was sorely needed in order for the prolific number of fossils collected to be stored correctly, studied effectively and that fossil discoveries of South Africa could be made known to the rest of the world.

One of the attendees of Broom's lecture was Bernard Price. Broom's eloquence and passion for South Africa's fossil discoveries persuaded Price to approach Broom and the university. Price soon provided the start-up capital needed to establish a research institute at the university dedicated to the collection, curation and research of South African fossils. It was decided that the geophysics research lab be moved to the main geology building on the University of the Witwatersrand campus, and the Bernard Price Institute was subsequently renamed the Bernard Price Institute of Palaeontological Research. Once the BPI was formally set up, Broom recommended that the young James Kitching, on his return from military service at the end of World War II, be the fledgling institute's first director. Kitching was signed in as the first member of staff on 26 October 1945.

Within a week of his appointment as Director, Kitching took a train from Johannesburg back to Graaff-Reinet to embark on his first official field trip for the BPI. Kitching borrowed his widowed mother's Buick sedan which he used as his field vehicle for his field trips around Graaff-Reinet and Nieu-Bethesda. Within five months Kitching, with the aid of his younger brothers, had assembled a collection of more than 200 fossil specimens as research material for the Bernard Price Institute, mostly skulls of therapsid species. Price was so thrilled with the success of the institute's first field trip that he doubled his funding propositions for the BPI. This allowed the institute to extend its field collecting activities to include Sterkfontein in the north and also the Makapansgat caves at what was then known as the Northern Transvaal (now Limpopo Province) of South Africa.

Over the following decades, the academic staff of the Bernard Price Institute led numerous research teams to Antarctica, the Americas, continental Europe, and Russia. From the 1990s, the hominin fossil-bearing sites were discovered to be far more widespread. Researchers discovered new sites such as Gladysvale, Kromdraai, Environs Sites, Malapa, Maropeng, and Rising Star Cave. With exception of the Rising Star Cave, these new sites along with Sterkfontein and Makapansgat are now part of the greater Cradle of Humankind world heritage site. In addition, archaeology work has been led at sites such as Blombos Cave and the Klipdrift Shelter in association with the institute. A separate hominin fossil vault has also been set up to separately store hominin fossils recovered from the various hominid-bearing fossil sites around the country.

When Kitching retired in 1990, the Director's post of the Bernard Price Institute was awarded to Professor Bruce Rubidge, the grandson of Sidney H. Haughton. Rubidge held his directorship position until the end of 2016, however, he still works closely with the institute. It is well known in the paleontology community of South Africa that Haughton and the Kitchings sparked the same passion for paleontology in Rubidge as a young boy that they had possessed. A brother of Rubidge, who inherited the Wellwood farm, maintains the Karoo fossil collection housed at the farm.

The Evolutionary Studies Institute remains an active research and teaching institution whose small staff and their students remain dedicated to exploring the fossils of the Karoo Basin and the famous hominin fossil-bearing sites - true to the original dreams of Broom and Price.

== Research ==
The Evolutionary Studies Institute's main research focuses include the paleontological and sedimentological development of the Carboniferous-Jurassic Great Karoo Basin, phylogenetic research of dinosaur species and their relatives, and hominins from the Plio-Pleistocene fossil-bearing deposits.

== Journal ==
Palaeontologia Africana is the Evolutionary Studies Institute's in-house scientific journal.
