= Saurabh Sinha =

South African engineer and academic

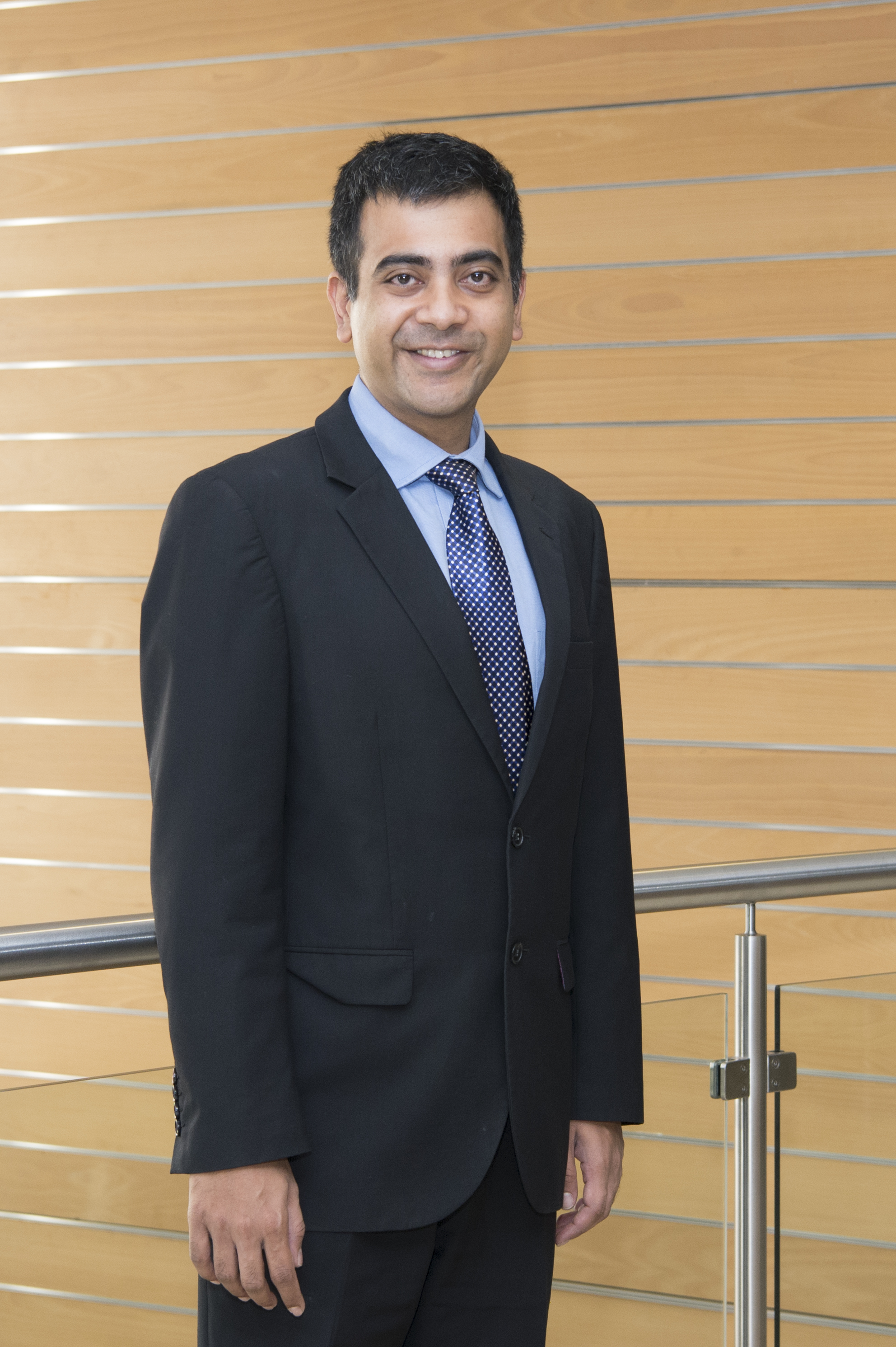
- Education: University of Pretoria
- Occupations: Professor and Deputy Vice-Chancellor: Research and Internationalisation, University of Johannesburg

Saurabh Sinha is an influential South African engineer and a Deputy Vice Chancellor for Research and Internationalisation at the University of Johannesburg. He was previously the Executive Dean of the Faculty of Engineering and the Built Environment at the University of Johannesburg. He formerly served as Director of the Carl and Emily Fuchs Institute for Microelectronics at the University of Pretoria, from which he graduated with a Ph.D. in electronic engineering.

== Education ==
Sinha obtained his B. Eng. (cum laude), M. Eng. (cum laude) and Ph.D. degrees in Electronic Engineering from the University of Pretoria.

== Career ==
Sinha served at the University of Pretoria for over 10 years, culminating with his appointment as director of the Carl and Emily Fuchs Institute for Microelectronics at the Department of Electrical, Electronic and Computer Engineering. The Department is one of the largest of its kind in the Southern Hemisphere, and contributes 25% of engineers in this category in South Africa.

In October 2013, Sinha was appointed as Executive Dean of the Faculty of Engineering and the Built at Environment (FEBE) at University of Johannesburg. He also serves as managing editor of the research journal of the South African Institute of Electrical Engineers.

== Board memberships ==
Sinha has served two terms on the Board of Directors of the Institute of Electrical and Electronics Engineers (IEEE) as Vice President, Educational Activities. He also served on the Electrical Engineering Professional Advisory Committee, Engineering Council of South Africa (ECSA).

== Awards and accolades ==
Sinha is a recipient of the University of Pretoria Laureate Award (2010), the SAIEE Engineer of the Year Award, and the TW Kambule NRF-NSTF Award. In 2015 he presented the Bernard Price Memorial Lecture. He has written over 130 journal articles, book chapters, and conference papers. He is the author of three books. In November 2020 it was announced that he was elevated by the Board of Directors of IEEE to "Fellow of IEEE" -- "for leading micro/nanoelectronics research and education in Africa."
