= Willis Jackson =

Willis Jackson may refer to:

- Willis Jackson, Baron Jackson of Burnley (1904–1970), British technologist and electrical engineer
- Willis Jackson (saxophonist) (1932–1987), American jazz tenor saxophonist
- Willis Jackson, fictional character on the U. S. sitcom Diff'rent Strokes
