= Cortex =

Cortex or cortical may refer to:

== Biology ==
- Cortex (anatomy), the outermost layer of an organ
  - Cerebral cortex, the outer layer of the vertebrate cerebrum, part of which is the forebrain
    - Motor cortex, the regions of the cerebral cortex involved in voluntary motor functions
    - Prefrontal cortex, the anterior part of the frontal lobes of the brain
    - Visual cortex, regions of the cerebral cortex involved in visual functions
  - Cerebellar cortex, the outer layer of the vertebrate cerebellum
  - Renal cortex, the outer portion of the kidney
  - Adrenal cortex, a portion of the adrenal gland
- Cell cortex, the region of a cell directly underneath the membrane
- Cortex (hair), the middle layer of a strand of hair
- Cortex (botany), the outer portion of the stem or root of a plant

== Entertainment ==
- Cortex (film), a 2008 French film directed by Nicolas Boukhrief
- Cortex (podcast), a 2015 podcast
- Doctor Neo Cortex, a fictional character in the Crash Bandicoot video game series
- Cortex (band), a French jazz funk band featuring Alain Mion
- Cortex, a Swedish post-punk alternative band featuring Freddie Wadling

== Other uses ==
- Cortex (archaeology), the outer layer of rock formed on the exterior of raw materials by chemical and mechanical weathering processes
- Cortex (journal), cognitive science journal published by Elsevier
- Cortex, a family of the ARM architecture of CPUs
- Cortex, a division of Gemini Sound Products
- Cortex, a digital lending platform by Think Finance
- Cortex Pharmaceuticals, a company of New Jersey, United States
- Cortex Innovation Community, a district in St. Louis, Missouri, United States

== See also ==
- Cordtex, a type of detonating cord used in mining
- Corex (disambiguation)
