= C10H10N2O2 =

The molecular formula C_{10}H_{10}N_{2}O_{2} (molar mass: 190.202 g/mol) may refer to:

- Tambjamine
- Tryptamine-4,5-dione
