= Bernard Price =

Dr. Bernard Price, OBE, (1877 – 9 July 1948) was the founding Chief Engineer and later General Manager of the Victoria Falls and Transvaal Power Company in South Africa between 1911 and 1936.

== Background ==
Price was born in England, in 1877 and was employed by the consulting engineers Merz & McLellan from 1901 until leaving for Transvaal Colony in 1909. He was President of the South African Institute of Electrical Engineers in 1915, and was awarded Honorary Life Membership of the SAIEE in 1940. Dr Price was a benefactor of the University of the Witwatersrand, being instrumental in the founding of the Bernard Price Institute for Palaeontological Research. The annual Bernard Price Memorial Lecture, named in his honour, is hosted by the SAIEE and the University of the Witwatersrand.
