= UStrive =

Non-profit organizations based in California

- Founded: 2007
- Type: 501(c)(3) charitable organization
- Purpose: Expanding college access in under-served communities
- Location: California
- Region served: United States
- Key people: Michael J. Carter, Founder and CEO

UStrive is an American nonprofit dedicated to "alleviating inequity in access to higher education". Strive provides high school students with free, online mentoring and guidance with college applications. It is headquartered in Milpitas, California and has volunteer mentors from corporations and colleges nationwide.

== History ==
Michael J. Carter started what was then called Strive for College in 2007 while a student at Washington University in St. Louis, mentoring students at nearby Eskridge High School. Strive for College expanded following a seed grant in 2009 and grew to become a nationwide organization. It piloted the nation’s first virtual college guidance curriculum in 2013 with the JA & Kathryn Albertson Foundation and launched a national scaling effort with partners including Bloomberg Philanthropies and College Board the following year.

Strive for College's growth was sustained with the help of influential sponsors: philanthropist Connie Lurie, former SJSU President Don Kassing, and education innovator, Tom Vander Ark. Strive for College has worked in partnership with the Michael & Susan Dell Foundation, JA & Kathryn Albertson Foundation, Bloomberg Philanthropies, College Board, National College Advising Corps, Deutsche Bank, Fossil Foundation, Annie E. Casey Foundation and Think Finance.

In 2016, Strive for College merged with the Center for Student Opportunity, a nonprofit that partners with colleges and universities to support first-generation college students. Through this merger, Strive now runs an initiative called I'm First! - a program dedicated to supporting and encouraging first generation college students. ImFirst.org is an online community featuring blogs and stories from first-generation college students and graduates. Strive annually publishes the I'm First! College Guide, a workbook designed for high school students who aspire to be the first in their family to attend college. This guide is distributed nationally to high schools and youth-serving organizations.

Also in 2016, Strive for College and The Common Application began a partnership where all students applying to college through the Common App, who indicate a need for a fee waiver, are able to register for a Strive mentor. At the same time, corporate collaborators like Deloitte’s RightStep Impact Venture, started recruiting employees as Strive mentors. Also notable in 2016 was the release of the Strive iOS app.

In 2020, Strive for College rebranded to UStrive.

== Program ==
UStrive’s technology platform matches high school students and mentors. The mentor and student communicate via the platform and work through the mentoring program which is based on a series of sessions outlined in the organization’s curriculum, which focuses on college admission and financial aid.

== Performance ==
According to Strive for College’s profile for CNN Heroes, “40% of Strive students attend four-year colleges without having to come out of pocket for their tuition—compared with 32% of low-income college students nationwide.”

== See also ==
- Education in the United States
- Higher education in the United States
- College tuition in the United States
- College admissions in the United States
