= Tryptamine-4,5-dione =

Names
- IUPAC name 3-(2-aminoethyl)-1H-indole-4,5-dione

Identifiers
CAS Number	108560-71-0
3D model (JSmol)	Interactive image
ChemSpider	115797
PubChem CID	130948
CompTox Dashboard (EPA)	DTXSID10148588
- InChI: InChI=1S/C10H10N2O2/c11-4-3-6-5-12-7-1-2-8(13)10(14)9(6)7/h1-2,5,12H,3-4,11H2 Key: IEEQBAOIHWUWBM-UHFFFAOYSA-N
- SMILES: C1=CC(=O)C(=O)C2=C1NC=C2CCN

Properties
Chemical formula	C_{10}H_{10}N_{2}O_{2}
Molar mass	190.202 g·mol^{−1}
- Except where otherwise noted, data are given for materials in their standard state (at 25 °C [77 °F], 100 kPa). Infobox references

Tryptamine-4,5-dione it is a neurotoxin that is a metabolite of the oxidation of the monoamine neurotransmitter serotonin, which may contribute to selective neurodegeneration and methamphetamine-induced serotonergic neurotoxicity.

== Formation ==
Tryptamine-4,5-dione is a quinone formed in the body when the neurotransmitter 5-hydroxytryptamine is oxidized by chemical radicals, namely reactive oxygen ( and nitrogen species under conditions of oxidative stress. At the same time, tryptamine-4,5-dione is a rather unstable and reactive compound; in an acidic medium, it begins to degrade very rapidly, leading to dimerization. The reaction begins with tryptamine-4,5-dione reacting with water, which adds to the carbon atom at position 7 to form 4,5,7-trihydroxytryptamine. This intermediate then reacts with oxygen or the original neurotoxin, resulting in the generation of free radicals, which collide with one another to form dimers. During methamphetamine intoxication or ischemia-reperfusion, a massive release and subsequent reuptake of 5-HT by SERT transporters is induced, in parallel with a sharp increase in the concentration of the superoxide anion radical (O_{2}•^{-}). The interaction of O_{2}•^{-} with 5-HT leads to its free radical auto-oxidation, forming the intermediate tryptamine-4,5-dione, which acts precisely as an endogenous neurotoxin.

Tryptamine-4,5-dione is involved in the endogenous formation of a monoaminergic neurotoxin and monoamine depletor: 7-S-glutathionyl-tryptamine-4,5-dione, which is formed upon the binding of tryptamine-4,5-dione with glutathione. The LD_{50} value for the conjugate, measured via direct intracerebral administration, was 21 μg/kg. Acting as a stimulant, it primarily induced hyperactivity during the first 30 minutes post-injection, but also statistically significantly decreased the total brain levels of norepinephrine, dopamine, and 5-HT. Concurrently, the brain levels of dopamine metabolites, namely 3,4-dihydroxyphenylacetic acid and homovanillic acid, were significantly increased. In the presence of GSH, NADPH, and ascorbic acid, 7-S-glutathionyl-tryptamine-4,5-dione participated in redox cycling, catalyzing the oxidation of these cellular reducing agents by oxygen to generate H_{2}O_{2} as a byproduct. The compound also reacted with an excess of GSH, forming structurally more complex glutathionyl conjugates that may be linked to Alzheimer's disease.

== Toxicity ==
Tryptamine-4,5-dione acts primarily as a neurotoxin, inducing a decrease in cell viability driven by a critical increase in intracellular reactive oxygen species. It caused neuronal death and axonal destruction, specifically targeting the limbic and cortical circuits that are the first to degenerate in Alzheimer's disease. Although the toxicity is dose-dependent, tryptamine-4,5-dione specifically destroyed brain anatomical structures: it caused the loss of pyramidal neurons and their synaptic connections in the CA1 and CA3 sectors of the hippocampus, induced axon terminal degeneration and neuronal death in the subgranular zone of the dentate gyrus, led to massive neuronal death in the entorhinal cortex, and caused the destruction of axon terminals in the cingulate cortex, alongside synaptic degeneration and cell death in the insular cortex. Furthermore, when the neurotoxin was microinjected into the cingulate cortex, the degeneration propagated further along the axons, destroying their terminals in the target areas of the caudate nucleus and the anterior thalamic nuclei.

To evaluate the serotonergic toxicity of tryptamine-4,5-dione, several mechanisms can be considered that align with the understanding of this compound's toxicity toward serotonergic neurons. Tryptamine-4,5-dione acts as a potent, selective serotonin-releasing agent, with fluoxetine only partially blocking the 5-HT release induced by tryptamine-4,5-dione; the release mechanism is hypothesized to involve binding to sulfhydryl groups. Furthermore, it acts as an irreversible inhibitor of tryptophan hydroxylase (TPH), likely resulting from the covalent modification of cysteine residues in the target's active site. The metabolite 7-S-glutathionyl-tryptamine-4,5-dione also inhibited TPH, albeit reversibly; nevertheless, tryptamine-4,5-dione induced serotonin depletion without eliminating serotonergic nerve terminals.

The underlying mechanism of serotonergic neurodegeneration induced by methamphetamine or cerebral ischemia-reperfusion injury involves the massive release and reuptake of 5-hydroxytryptamine, in parallel with the excessive formation of cytoplasmic superoxide anion radical, which react to form tryptamine-4,5-dione. At a concentration of 100 μM, this neurotoxin uncouples mitochondrial respiration and inhibits active respiration coupled with ATP synthesis. Furthermore, tryptamine-4,5-dione causes irreversible inhibition of two respiratory chain complexes, namely respiratory complex I and complex IV (or cytochrome c oxidase). The mechanism of this inhibition involves the covalent modification of key sulfhydryl residues located directly within or in critical proximity to the active sites of these respiratory enzyme complexes.
