= Victoria Falls and Transvaal Power Company =

1906–1948 South African electricity supply company

- Company type: Public company
- Industry: Power industry
- Predecessor: African Concessions Syndicate
- Founded: Southern Rhodesia (1906)
- Defunct: 1948
- Fate: Expropriated
- Successor: Eskom
- Headquarters: London, England, UK
- Area served: South Africa

Victoria Falls and Transvaal Power Company was a South African-based electricity company that supplied power to the goldmines and industry on the Witwatersrand. It was a Southern Rhodesian registered company whose main facilities were based in the Transvaal, South Africa. It was formed in 1906 and would supply power in its own name and on behalf of Eskom until 1948 when it was expropriated by the former.

== Origins ==
In 1896, the British South Africa Company (BSA), established by Cecil John Rhodes, created a subsidiary called the African Concessions Syndicate (ACS). This syndicate obtained a concession in Southern Rhodesia which gave it the right to generate 250,000 kW at Victoria Falls for seventy-five years. But more importantly, it also obtained an exclusive right to supply the goldfields at the Witwatersrand. There were several issues with the idea. One, Victoria Falls was a poor choice as during the dry season, little water flowed, and secondly the transmission line technology at the time would result in too much electricity being lost over the distances required to the Witwatersrand. Lastly there was the abundance of cheap coal available the Transvaal for steam generation. The coal owners lobbied the Transvaal Colony government, and it prohibited the supply of electrify from outside the colony.

== Formation ==
On 17 October 1906, a company called Victoria Falls Power Company (VFPC) was formed and registered in Southern Rhodesia. Two months later, on 14 December 1906, the ACS sold its concessions to VFPC for £120,000 and one million shares worth £1 each. VFPC was listed on the stock market but after a poor take-up of shares, 80% of shares been taken by the underwriters of the offer. German banks, Deutsche and Dresdner, were the investors of the preference shares would ensure that machinery required in the future would be supplied by the AEG.

On 1 January 1907, VFPC purchased the General Electric Power Company, based on the Witwatersrand from ACS for £50,000 in cash and £100,000 in shares. In 1897, the Simmer and Jack mining company was granted a concession to produce electricity by the South African Republic government. The concession was sold in March 1899 to the General Electric Power Company, part of Consolidated Goldfields, with the power plant situated near Germiston. The Transvaal Colony government had modified the terms of the concession in 1905.

The next power company on the Witwatersrand bought, was the Rand Central Electric Works Ltd which was also purchased in 1907 for £175,000 in debentures and the same amount in preference shares in VFPC. Rand Central Electric Works had been granted a concession to produce electricity in March 1895 by the South African Republic government. The latter placed conditions on concession which included one-year notice period to expropriate the company that could be exercised after fifteen years, and the calculation required to work out the purchase price. After the end of the Second Boer War, in 1905–6, the Transvaal Colony government extended the beginning of the expropriation period by 42 years or 1948. This was agreement carried forward when the Union of South Africa was created in 1910. The power plant was based in Brakpan and was upgraded by VFPC and AEG with two new 3MW units. A new power plant would be constructed at Simmerpan designed by AEG and consisted of four 3MW units, south of the Johannesburg CBD. In May 1907, VFPC supplied electricity to the Johannesburg municipality and its tram network after the latter's contracted gas power plant was closed down due to a gassing and an explosion. This lasted until June 1908.

Walter Andrew Harper, in 1908, saw an opportunity for new power plant business, Rand Mines Power Supply, in the electrification of Rand Mines, part of the Wernher, Beit, Eckstein Company. VFPC saw the same opportunity and negotiations started with Rand Mines. Harper however won the contract but failed to find companies in the UK to supply the plant equipment. Harped sold his contract to VFPC. Rand Mines owner Wernher Beit wanted a separate company to manage it so a subsidiary of VFPC so Rand Mines Power Supply was formed registered in the Transvaal. The plant equipment would be supplied by AEG and the site would at Rosherville, south of Johannesburg. The plan called for a power plant of seven units of 12MW each. At the same time, VFPC changed its name to the Victoria Falls and Transvaal Power Company (VFTPC) still registered in Southern Rhodesia.

In 1909, VFTP begun plans to build a power plant in Vereeniging buy buying land and ensuring water rights. The main problem was ensuring wayleaves for transmission lines to the Witwatersrand. Prior to this event and closer to the time of VFPC's formation in 1906, Isaac Lewis's company Lewis & Marks had bought up land for transmission lines to the Witwatersrand and land for a power plant in Vereeniging with the idea to supply electricity to mines provided by his own coal mines. VFPC bought the concept and paid for it with 20,000 shares, a seat on the board for Isaac Lewis and coal contract. As the Transvaal Colony had no legislation concerning the power industry nor the granting of wayleaves, it formed a Power commission under Sir Thomas Price, head of the railways which issued a report after much consultation and decision was made with the process taking one and half years later. The decision resulted in the Power Undertakings Act in 1910 and licences for VFPC.

== Government takes control of the electricity industry ==
The 1920s saw a potential threat to the VFTPC monopoly it held in the electricity market of the Transvaal. F. Lydall sent to South Africa in 1917 to draw up a report into the feasibility of electrifying the South African Railways (SAR) train network. He submitted his report in 1919 promoting its advantages and cost savings feasibility. A second report was commissioned by the South African government to investigate the condition of electricity supply in the country which would be needed to electrify the rail system. The investigation was carried out by Charles Merz from August 1919 and a report was delivered in April 1920. He recommended legislation to be enacted to regulate and unify the supply of electricity in the country, standardising the technical supply of electricity, setting prices, raising the money required for the plants and networks and laws to govern the expropriation of land and water rights.

SAR had an interest in the government controlling the electricity industry to secure its supply for the proposed electrification of its rail network as well as its business of delivering coal to the electricity industry. The Chamber of Mines ensured the proposed bill allowed for public tender when building new plants in the country.

The Electricity Act of 1922 was enacted on 1 September of that year creating an Electricity Control Board (ECB) that controlled and licensed the supply of electricity in South Africa and an Electricity Supply Commission (Escom) that established and managed power plants and networks to supply electricity to SAR, the government departments, local government, industry and the public and without making a profit or loss.

By 1923, VFTPC had failed in its attempt to control all the supply of electricity in the Transvaal as SAR wanted Escom to supply the power and not the VFTPC. After 15 months of negotiation between the ECB and VFTPC, which allowed Escom to be established, a compromise was reached in its attempt to build a new power plant. In June 1925, a licence was issued for a 60 MW power plant that would be built and operated in Witbank by VFTPC but owned by Escom. Water would be supplied by a new dam across the Groot Olifants River and a 123kV transmission line to Brakpan. Most of the power produced would be sold via Escom to railways, collieries, industries, and municipalities including Johannesburg at cost while the surplus power would be sold by VFTPC to the gold mines at a profit.

In 1934, land for a coalfield was bought by the African and European Investment Company in Vereeniging. The Klip Power Station, 6 km north of Vereeniging, was to be built on top of the land supplied with coal from the Springfield Colliery and water piped from the Vaal River. The power plant would be owned and financed by Escom and VFTPC would operate it. Again, electricity was sold at cost by Escom, and the surplus sold at profit to the gold mines by VFTPC. It started supply of 33MW of electricity in March 1936 eighteen months after construction started and was fully commissioned in July 1940.

== Unrest during the 1940s ==
On 27 January 1942, members of the military wing of the Ossewa Brandwag, the Stormjaers, under orders from Nazi agents in Mozambique, blew up an electricity pylon supplying Krugersdorp, but it was repaired four hours later. The next night saw twenty-six powerlines sabotaged and four days later all power was restored.

On 21 January 1944, the African Gas and Power Workers’ Union (AGPWU) called a strike of Black workers at the VFTPC power stations. The strike was based on lack of progress in improving the wages and living conditions of the Black workers that were housed in compounds on the VFTPC sites. White workers and members of the Native Military Corps were brought in to fill the work of the striking workers. The strike broke a day later when the government refused to negotiate a wage increase until the strike was over.

After an August 1946 African Mine Workers' Union strike (AMWU), the gold producers saw the future need to automate their facilities to decrease labour and so reduce the wage bill and its effect on profits. The automation would require cheaper electricity prices. The other issue was the need for more power to cool the deep mines, and would require further power infrastructure, something that had not been possible due to the Second World War. The cost of a unit of electricity was higher than what the mines would pay if the electricity were purchased directly from Escom. The mines demanded that VFTPC be nationalised earlier than expected.

== Expropriation ==
On 5 February 1947, the South African government announced in Parliament that VFTPC would be given notice that the company would be expropriated with the company expecting the date to be 1950. Escom however approached VFTPC to buy them out earlier than expected. VFTPC decided to negotiate then rather than apply the law and wait until the end of 1950. Negotiations on a price that would please all parties was conducted by R. Hagart, representing the South African Chamber of Mines, Hendrik van der Bijl, Escom while Bernard Price, director of VFTP in South Africa, represented the company's position.

In May 1948, VFTPC announced that the company had reached an agreement with Escom with its assets to be transferred on 30 June 1948. Assets were purchased for 14.5 million pounds. 1 July 1948, saw Escom take control of the company's assets with the gold mines looking forward to a reduction in their electricity costs. Escom acquired the power stations at Rosherville, Simmer Pan, Vereeniging and Brakpan consisting of 298MW of capacity, 2,106 km of transmission lines, twelve major and six minor distribution sub-stations and 918 transformers. ESKOM funded the purchase by issuing a £15 million bond at 3.125%.

VFTPC would head into voluntary liquidation. On Wednesday 16 March 1949, shareholders of VFTPC voted in favour of closing the company and liquidating its assets. When the liquidation process was completed five years later, £27 million was distributed to the shareholders of VFTPC.
