= Ian Craig (engineer) =

South African engineer

- Education: University of Pretoria; Massachusetts Institute of Technology; University of the Witwatersrand
- Occupation: Educator

Ian Craig is a South African engineer. He was selected to give the 67th 2018 Bernard Price Memorial Lecture from the South African Institute of Electrical Engineers (SAIEE). The title of his lecture was Automatic Control: The Hidden Technology that Modern Society Cannot Live Without.

== Academia ==
Craig has a BEng degree in Electronic Engineering from the University of Pretoria, an S.M. degree from the Massachusetts Institute of Technology, and an MBA and Ph.D from the University of the Witwatersrand. In 1995, he became a professor at the University of Pretoria in its Department of Electrical, Electronic and Computer Engineering, as well as head of the Control Systems Group.

== Publications ==
In 2005, Craig became editor-in-chief of Control Engineering Practice. He has published over 150 papers.

== Board memberships ==
In 2011, Craig was appointed President of the International Federation of Automatic Control (IFAC), a position he held until 2014. Three years later he became IFAC Advisor and then chair of its Foundation Board and Publications Committee. Craig is a Fellow of the South African Institute of Electrical Engineers and the Society for Automation, Instrumentation, Measurement and Control (SAIMC).

== Acclaim ==
The awards and recognition Craig has received include the following:

- 2006: elected Fellow of the South African Academy of Engineering
- 2008: received the IFAC Outstanding Service Award
- 2014: President's Award recipient from the South African Institute of Electrical Engineers (SAIEE)
- Exceptional Academic Achiever Award from the University of Pretoria (three times)
- He is rated as an internationally acclaimed researcher by the South African National Research Foundation.
