= Bernard Price Memorial Lecture =

Annual science lecture in South Africa

The Bernard Price Memorial Lecture is the premier annual lecture of the South African Institute of Electrical Engineers. It is of general scientific or engineering interest and is given by an invited guest, often from overseas, at several of the major centres on South Africa. The main lecture and accompanying dinner are usually held at the University of Witwatersrand and it is also presented in the space of one week at other centres, typically Cape Town, Durban, East London and Port Elizabeth.

The Lecture is named in memory of the eminent electrical engineer Bernard Price. The first lecture was held in 1951, and it has occurred as an annual event ever since.

== Lecturers ==
1951 Basil Schonland
1952 A M Jacobs
1953 H J Van Eck
1954 J M Meek
1955 Frank Nabarro
1956 A L Hales
1957 P G Game
1958 Colin Cherry
1959 Thomas Allibone
1960 M G Say
1961 Willis Jackson
1963 W R Stevens
1964 William Pickering
1965 G.H. Rawcliffe
1966 Harold Bishop
1967 Eric Eastwood
1968 F J Lane
1969 A H Reeves
1970 Andrew R Cooper
1971 Herbert Haslegrave
1972 W J Bray
1973 R Noser
1974 D Kind
1975 L Kirchmayer
1976 S Jones
1977 J Johnson
1978 T G E Cockbain
1979 A R Hileman
1980 James Redmond
1981 L M Muntzing
1982 K F Raby
1983 R Isermann
1984 M N John
1985 J W L de Villiers
1986 Derek Roberts
1987 Wolfram Boeck
1988 Karl Gehring
1989 Leonard Sagan
1990 GKF Heyner
1991 P S Blythin
1992 P M Neches
1993 P Radley
1994 P R Rosen
1995 F P Sioshansi
1996 J Taylor
1997 M Chamia
1998 C Gellings
1999 M W Kennedy
2000 John Midwinter
2001 Pragasen Pillay
2002 Polina Bayvel
2003 Case Rijsdijk
2004 Frank Larkins
2005 Igor Aleksander
2006 Kevin Warwick
2007 Skip Hatfield
2008 Sami Solanki
2009 William Gruver
2010 Glenn Ricart
2011 Philippe Paelinck
2012 Nick Frydas
2013 Vint Cerf
2014 Ian Jandrell
2015 Saurabh Sinha
2016 Tshilidzi Marwala
2017 Fulufhelo Nelwamondo
2018 Ian Craig
2019 Robert Metcalfe
2020 Roger Price
2021 Saifur Rahman
2022 Stuart J. Russell
2023 Jan Meyer
2024 Vukosi Marivate

== See also ==
- List of engineering awards
