= Paul Park =

American novelist (born 1954)

- Born: Paul Claiborne Park; October 1, 1954 (age 72); North Adams, Massachusetts, U.S.
- Occupation: Author
- Writing career
- Genres: Science fiction; fantasy

Paul Claiborne Park (born October 1, 1954, in North Adams, Massachusetts) is an American science fiction and fantasy author. He taught literature and writing in the Williams College English Department and the Graduate Program in art history, retiring as a senior lecturer in 2022. He also taught at the Clarion West writing workshop and the Clarion Workshop and was an instructor at Clarion West in 2011.

== Career ==
Park appeared on the American science fiction scene in 1987 and quickly established himself as a writer of polished, if often grim, literary science fiction. His first work was the Starbridge Chronicles trilogy, set on a world with generations-long seasons much like Brian Aldiss' Helliconia trilogy. His critically acclaimed novels have since dealt with colonialism on alien worlds (Coelestis), Biblical (Three Marys) and Theosophical (The Gospel of Corax) legends, a parallel world where magic works (A Princess of Roumania and its sequels, The Tourmaline, The White Tyger and The Hidden World), and other topics. He has published short stories in Omni Magazine, Interzone and other magazines, along with anthology series including Postscripts and Exotic Gothic. In 2010 his short story "The Persistence of Memory, or This Space for Sale" was nominated for a World Fantasy Award; and his novella "Ghosts Doing the Orange Dance" was nominated for a 2010 Nebula Award.

== Works ==
=== Novels ===
- The Starbridge Chronicles
  - Soldiers of Paradise. New York: Arbor House, 1987. ISBN 0-87795-861-0
  - Sugar Rain. New York: Morrow, 1989. ISBN 1-55710-029-2
  - The Cult of Loving Kindness. New York: Morrow, 1991. ISBN 0-688-10574-2
- Coelestis (vt US Celestis, 1995). London: HarperCollins, 1993, ISBN 0-00-224175-7
- The Gospel of Corax. New York: Soho Press, 1996. ISBN 1-56947-061-8
- Three Marys. Canton, Ohio: Cosmos Books, 2003. ISBN 1-58715-519-2
- A Princess of Roumania
  - A Princess of Roumania. New York: Tor, 2005. ISBN 0-7653-1096-1
  - The Tourmaline. New York: Tor, 2006. ISBN 0-7653-1441-X
  - The White Tyger. New York: Tor, 2007. ISBN 0-7653-1529-7
  - The Hidden World. New York: Tor, 2008. ISBN 0-7653-1668-4
- All Those Vanished Engines. New York: Tor, 2014. ISBN 978-0-7653-7540-7

As by Paulina Claiborne

- The Rose of Sarifal. Wizards of the Coast, Forgotten Realms, 2012. ISBN 0-78693026-8

=== Short fiction ===
Collections

- If Lions Could Speak, Rockville, Maryland: Wildside Press, April 2002. ISBN 1-58715-512-5
- Other Stories, Hornsea: PS Publishing, 2015. ISBN 978-1-84863-954-6

Stories

Title	Year	First published	Reprinted/collected	Notes
No Traveler Returns	2004	Park, Paul (2004). No traveller returns. Harrogate: PS Publishing.		Novella
Ghosts Doing the Orange Dance (The Parke Family Scrapbook Number IV)	2010	Park, Paul (January–February 2010). "Ghosts doing the Orange Dance (The Parke Family Scrapbook Number IV)". F&SF. 118 (1&2): 98–166.	Park, Paul (2013). Ghosts doing the Orange Dance. Harrogate: PS Publishing.	Novella
