= 2015 World Senior Curling Championships – Men's tournament =

2015 World Senior Curling Championships Men's tournament
- Host city: Sochi, Russia
- Arena: Iceberg Skating Palace
- Dates: April 18–25
- Winner: United States
- Curling club: Granite CC, Seattle, Washington
- Skip: Lyle Sieg
- Third: Tom Violette
- Second: Ken Trask
- Lead: Steve Lundeen
- Alternate: Duane Rutan
- Finalist: Canada (Alan O'Leary)

The men's tournament of the 2015 World Senior Curling Championships was held from April 18 to 25 at the Iceberg Skating Palace in Sochi, Russia.

== Teams ==
The teams are listed as follows:

=== Group A ===
Canada	Czech Republic	Ireland	Italy
Skip: Alan O'Leary; Third: Andrew Dauphinee; Second: Danny Christianson; Lead: Harold McCarthy	Skip: Matěj Neznal; Third: Richard Hobzik; Second: Roman Hasenöhrl; Lead: Vladimír Zelenka; Alternate: Karel Kubeska	Skip: Bill Gray; Third: Neil Fyfe; Second: David Whyte; Lead: David Hume	Fourth: Mario Bologna; Skip: Danilo Capriolo; Second: Guido Barco; Lead: Paolo Prochet; Alternate: Silvio Dellaia
Japan	Kazakhstan	Latvia	Scotland
Skip: Masayasu Sato; Third: Shunichi Fujita; Second: Takahiro Hashimoto; Lead: Shozo Itoh	Skip: Viktor Kim; Third: Almaz Saidvakassov; Second: Roman Kazimirchik; Lead: Nikolay Zhorov; Alternate: Iskander Farizov	Skip: Ansis Regža; Third: Pēteris Šveisbergs; Second: Aivars Purmalis; Lead: Aivars Gulbis; Alternate: Ivars Černajs	Skip: Gordon Muirhead; Third: Norman Brown; Second: David Hay; Lead: Hugh Aitken; Alternate: Michael Hay

=== Group B ===
Denmark	England	Hungary	New Zealand
Fourth: Poul-Erik Nielsen; Third: Keld Henriksen; Skip: Ole de Neergaard; Lead: Anders Reck-Magnussen	Skip: John Summers; Third: Charles Jackson; Second: David Sillito; Lead: Andrew Taylor	Skip: Andras Rokusfalvy; Third: Zoltán Palancsa; Second: Janos Miklai; Lead: Gyorgy Kalmar; Alternate: Mihaly Veraszro	Skip: Hans Frauenlob; Third: Dan Mustapic; Second: Lorne De Pape; Lead: Iain Craig; Alternate: Dave Watt
Norway	Russia	Sweden	Turkey
Fourth: Kjell Berk; Third: Stig Arne Gunnestad; Second: Morten Tveit; Skip: Halvard Kverne	Skip: Sergey Narudinov; Third: Oleg Badilin; Second: Mikhail Rivkind; Lead: Yurly Erdukov; Alternate: Aleksander Kolesnikov	Skip: Anders Westerberg; Third: Rickard Bergqvist; Second: Claes Gunnarson; Lead: Lars Ahlberg; Alternate: Anders Kraupp	Skip: Ahmet Şırınkan; Third: Rıfat Nazım Saraçoǧlu; Second: Öner Gülbahçe; Lead: Ahmet Uǧur Nalcioǧlu

=== Group C ===
Australia	Finland	France	Germany
Skip: Hugh Millikin; Third: Wyatt Buck; Second: Tim McMahon; Lead: Rob Gagnon; Alternate: John Anderson	Skip: Kari Meranen; Third: Jaakko Lemettinen; Second: Ari Pitko; Lead: Matti Virtaala; Alternate: Kari Kuskelin	Skip: Pascal Adam; Third: Thierry Donard; Second: Christophe Walter; Lead: Guy Unverzagt; Alternate: Gerard Mergy	Skip: Wolfgang Burba; Third: Joachim Burba; Second: Christoph Möckel; Lead: Matthias Steiner
Poland	Slovakia	Switzerland	United States
Fourth: Henryk Skowronski; Skip: Andrzej Janowski; Second: Jaroslaw Czepielinski; Lead: Piotr Sulak; Alternate: Witold Rek	Fourth: Juraj Kurth; Skip: Ondrej Marček; Second: Peter Mocek; Lead: Pavol Trstaň	Skip: Stefan Signer; Third: Jurg Denecke; Second: Gerhard Kurt; Lead: Daniel Grunenfelder; Alternate: Hans Wirz	Skip: Lyle Sieg; Third: Tom Violette; Second: Ken Trask; Lead: Steve Lundeen; Alternate: Duane Rutan

== Round-robin standings ==
Final round-robin standings

Key
Teams to Playoffs
Teams to Tiebreaker

Group A	Skip	W	L
Canada	Alan O'Leary	7	0
Scotland	Gordon Muirhead	5	2
Ireland	Bill Gray	4	3
Czech Republic	Matej Neznal	4	3
Japan	Masayasu Sato	4	3
Italy	Danilo Capriolo	2	5
Latvia	Ansis Regža	2	5
Kazakhstan	Viktor Kim	0	7

Group B	Skip	W	L
Denmark	Ole de Neergaard	7	0
New Zealand	Hans Frauenlob	6	1
Sweden	Anders Westerberg	4	3
Norway	Halvard Kverne	3	4
England	John Summers	3	4
Hungary	Zoltán Palancsa	3	4
Russia	Sergey Narudinov	2	5
Turkey	Ahmet Şırınkan	0	7

Group C	Skip	W	L
United States	Lyle Sieg	7	0
Switzerland	Stefan Signer	5	2
Australia	Hugh Millikin	5	2
Finland	Kari Meranen	4	3
Germany	Wolfgang Burba	4	3
Slovakia	Ondrej Marček	2	5
France	Pascal Adam	1	6
Poland	Andrzej Janowski	0	7

== Round-robin results ==
=== Group A ===
==== Saturday, April 18 ====
Draw 1 8:00

Sheet A	1	2	3	4	5	6	7	8	Final
Czech Republic (Neznal)	0	1	0	0	1	0	2	X	4
Scotland (Muirhead)	5	0	0	0	0	3	0	X	8

Sheet B	1	2	3	4	5	6	7	8	Final
Canada (O'Leary)	0	0	0	1	0	2	2	X	5
Latvia (Regža)	2	0	1	0	0	0	0	X	3

Sheet C	1	2	3	4	5	6	7	8	Final
Italy (Capriolo)	0	1	0	1	0	0	0	X	2
Japan (Sato)	2	0	2	0	3	1	2	X	10

Sheet E	1	2	3	4	5	6	7	8	Final
Kazakhstan (Kim)	0	0	0	0	0	1	0	X	1
Ireland (Gray)	4	1	0	1	1	0	2	X	9

Draw 3 17:00

Sheet B	1	2	3	4	5	6	7	8	Final
Italy (Capriolo)	1	0	0	0	1	0	0	X	2
Czech Republic (Neznal)	0	1	2	4	0	1	2	X	10

Sheet E	1	2	3	4	5	6	7	8	Final
Japan (Sato)	0	0	0	1	0	2	0	X	3
Scotland (Muirhead)	2	3	1	0	1	0	2	X	9

==== Sunday, April 19 ====
Draw 5 8:00

Sheet C	1	2	3	4	5	6	7	8	Final
Kazakhstan (Kim)	0	0	0	0	0	0	X	X	0
Canada (O'Leary)	4	1	1	2	3	1	X	X	12

Draw 6 12:00

Sheet C	1	2	3	4	5	6	7	8	Final
Ireland (Gray)	0	0	0	3	0	1	0	1	5
Latvia (Regža)	0	1	0	0	1	0	1	0	3

Draw 7 16:00

Sheet D	1	2	3	4	5	6	7	8	Final
Kazakhstan (Kim)	0	1	0	1	0	0	X	X	2
Scotland (Muirhead)	2	0	5	0	4	3	X	X	14

Sheet E	1	2	3	4	5	6	7	8	Final
Czech Republic (Neznal)	0	0	1	0	0	0	1	X	2
Canada (O'Leary)	3	1	0	1	0	0	0	X	5

Draw 8 20:00

Sheet D	1	2	3	4	5	6	7	8	Final
Italy (Capriolo)	1	0	3	0	3	1	0	1	9
Latvia (Regža)	0	4	0	3	0	0	1	0	8

Sheet E	1	2	3	4	5	6	7	8	Final
Ireland (Gray)	0	0	0	1	1	1	1	0	4
Japan (Sato)	2	1	2	0	0	0	0	2	7

==== Monday, April 20 ====
Draw 11 16:00

Sheet D	1	2	3	4	5	6	7	8	Final
Czech Republic (Neznal)	0	1	0	2	0	0	0	X	3
Ireland (Gray)	3	0	3	0	1	2	2	X	11

Draw 12 20:00

Sheet A	1	2	3	4	5	6	7	8	Final
Canada (O'Leary)	1	0	2	0	2	0	0	1	6
Japan (Sato)	0	2	0	1	0	1	0	0	4

Sheet B	1	2	3	4	5	6	7	8	Final
Kazakhstan (Kim)	0	0	0	0	1	0	1	X	2
Italy (Capriolo)	1	1	2	3	0	2	0	X	9

Sheet E	1	2	3	4	5	6	7	8	Final
Scotland (Muirhead)	2	0	1	0	2	0	1	0	6
Latvia (Regža)	0	2	0	1	0	2	0	2	7

==== Tuesday, April 21 ====
Draw 15 16:00

Sheet A	1	2	3	4	5	6	7	8	Final
Latvia (Regža)	1	0	3	1	2	0	2	X	9
Kazakhstan (Kim)	0	1	0	0	0	1	0	X	2

Sheet B	1	2	3	4	5	6	7	8	9	Final
Ireland (Gray)	0	1	2	0	1	0	0	1	0	5
Canada (O'Leary)	2	0	0	1	0	1	1	0	1	6

Sheet C	1	2	3	4	5	6	7	8	Final
Japan (Sato)	0	1	0	0	1	0	4	X	6
Czech Republic (Neznal)	3	0	0	1	0	4	0	X	8

Sheet D	1	2	3	4	5	6	7	8	Final
Scotland (Muirhead)	4	1	0	0	0	0	1	X	6
Italy (Capriolo)	0	0	0	0	2	1	0	X	3

==== Wednesday, April 22 ====
Draw 17 8:00

Sheet B	1	2	3	4	5	6	7	8	Final
Czech Republic (Neznal)	2	0	3	1	2	1	1	X	10
Kazakhstan (Kim)	0	3	0	0	0	0	0	X	3

Sheet C	1	2	3	4	5	6	7	8	9	Final
Canada (O'Leary)	0	1	0	1	0	0	3	0	1	6
Scotland (Muirhead)	0	0	2	0	0	2	0	1	0	5

Draw 20 20:00

Sheet A	1	2	3	4	5	6	7	8	Final
Italy (Capriolo)	0	0	0	1	0	1	X	X	2
Ireland (Gray)	3	2	1	0	4	0	X	X	10

Sheet B	1	2	3	4	5	6	7	8	Final
Latvia (Regža)	0	0	3	0	1	0	1	0	5
Japan (Sato)	2	1	0	1	0	2	0	1	7

==== Thursday, April 23 ====
Draw 22 12:00

Sheet B	1	2	3	4	5	6	7	8	Final
Scotland (Muirhead)	0	4	0	1	0	0	2	X	7
Ireland (Gray)	1	0	1	0	1	1	0	X	4

Sheet D	1	2	3	4	5	6	7	8	Final
Japan (Sato)	4	4	1	1	4	4	X	X	18
Kazakhstan (Kim)	0	0	0	0	0	0	X	X	0

Sheet E	1	2	3	4	5	6	7	8	9	Final
Latvia (Regža)	1	0	1	1	0	0	1	0	0	4
Czech Republic (Neznal)	0	0	0	0	0	2	0	2	1	5

Draw 24 20:00

Sheet E	1	2	3	4	5	6	7	8	Final
Canada (O'Leary)	1	0	2	1	1	0	2	X	7
Italy (Capriolo)	0	1	0	0	0	1	0	X	2

=== Group B ===
==== Saturday, April 18 ====
Draw 2 13:15

Sheet D	1	2	3	4	5	6	7	8	Final
Denmark (Neergaard)	1	2	1	0	0	1	0	0	5
New Zealand (Frauenlob)	0	0	0	1	1	0	1	1	4

Sheet E	1	2	3	4	5	6	7	8	Final
Norway (Kverne)	4	0	4	3	5	4	X	X	20
Turkey (Şırınkan)	0	1	0	0	0	0	X	X	1

Draw 3 17:00

Sheet A	1	2	3	4	5	6	7	8	9	Final
Sweden (Westerberg)	0	1	2	0	1	0	2	0	0	6
Hungary (Palancsa)	3	0	0	1	0	0	0	2	2	8

Sheet C	1	2	3	4	5	6	7	8	Final
England (Summers)	1	3	1	2	0	0	3	X	10
Russia (Narudinov)	0	0	0	0	4	1	0	X	5

==== Sunday, April 19 ====
Draw 5 8:00

Sheet A	1	2	3	4	5	6	7	8	Final
New Zealand (Frauenlob)	1	2	5	0	0	4	X	X	12
Turkey (Şırınkan)	0	0	0	1	1	0	X	X	2

Sheet B	1	2	3	4	5	6	7	8	Final
Denmark (Neergaard)	1	0	2	0	4	2	X	X	9
Norway (Kverne)	0	1	0	1	0	0	X	X	2

Sheet D	1	2	3	4	5	6	7	8	Final
Hungary (Palancsa)	0	1	1	1	1	0	0	0	4
Russia (Narudinov)	1	0	0	0	0	2	3	2	8

Sheet E	1	2	3	4	5	6	7	8	Final
Sweden (Westerberg)	1	1	0	3	1	0	2	X	8
England (Summers)	0	0	1	0	0	1	0	X	2

==== Monday, April 20 ====
Draw 10 12:00

Sheet A	1	2	3	4	5	6	7	8	Final
Denmark (Neergaard)	1	2	0	3	0	1	0	X	7
Russia (Narudinov)	0	0	2	0	2	0	1	X	5

Sheet B	1	2	3	4	5	6	7	8	Final
Hungary (Palancsa)	0	1	0	1	0	1	0	0	3
New Zealand (Frauenlob)	2	0	1	0	1	0	0	1	5

Sheet D	1	2	3	4	5	6	7	8	Final
Norway (Kverne)	0	0	3	0	2	1	0	X	6
England (Summers)	0	1	0	1	0	0	1	X	3

Draw 11 16:00

Sheet C	1	2	3	4	5	6	7	8	Final
Sweden (Westerberg)	5	2	3	1	1	3	X	X	15
Turkey (Şırınkan)	0	0	0	0	0	0	X	X	0

==== Tuesday, April 21 ====
Draw 13 8:00

Sheet B	1	2	3	4	5	6	7	8	Final
Turkey (Şırınkan)	0	0	0	1	0	1	1	X	3
Russia (Narudinov)	2	1	1	0	2	0	0	X	6

Sheet C	1	2	3	4	5	6	7	8	9	Final
Norway (Kverne)	1	0	0	0	2	0	2	0	0	5
Hungary (Palancsa)	0	0	1	1	0	1	0	2	1	6

Sheet D	1	2	3	4	5	6	7	8	Final
Sweden (Westerberg)	3	0	2	0	2	1	0	0	8
Denmark (Neergaard)	0	2	0	2	0	0	3	2	9

Draw 14 12:00

Sheet A	1	2	3	4	5	6	7	8	Final
England (Summers)	0	0	0	1	0	0	1	X	2
New Zealand (Frauenlob)	2	1	1	0	2	2	0	X	8

==== Wednesday, April 22 ====
Draw 18 12:00

Sheet B	1	2	3	4	5	6	7	8	Final
Norway (Kverne)	0	2	0	2	0	2	0	0	6
Sweden (Westerberg)	1	0	2	0	1	0	3	1	8

Sheet C	1	2	3	4	5	6	7	8	Final
Russia (Narudinov)	0	0	0	1	0	0	1	X	2
New Zealand (Frauenlob)	1	1	2	0	2	0	0	X	6

Sheet D	1	2	3	4	5	6	7	8	Final
England (Summers)	3	2	4	2	1	0	X	X	12
Turkey (Şırınkan)	0	0	0	0	0	1	X	X	1

Sheet E	1	2	3	4	5	6	7	8	Final
Denmark (Neergaard)	4	0	2	0	1	0	1	X	8
Hungary (Palancsa)	0	2	0	1	0	2	0	X	5

Draw 20 20:00

Sheet D	1	2	3	4	5	6	7	8	Final
Russia (Narudinov)	1	0	0	0	0	3	0	X	4
Sweden (Westerberg)	0	2	1	1	2	0	0	X	6

Sheet E	1	2	3	4	5	6	7	8	Final
New Zealand (Frauenlob)	1	0	1	0	0	2	0	X	4
Norway (Kverne)	0	1	0	0	1	0	0	X	2

==== Thursday, April 23 ====
Draw 22 12:00

Sheet A	1	2	3	4	5	6	7	8	Final
Turkey (Şırınkan)	0	0	0	1	0	0	X	X	1
Denmark (Neergaard)	3	3	1	0	4	3	X	X	14

Sheet C	1	2	3	4	5	6	7	8	Final
Hungary (Palancsa)	0	1	0	1	1	0	0	X	3
England (Summers)	1	0	2	0	0	1	2	X	6

Draw 24 20:00

Sheet A	1	2	3	4	5	6	7	8	Final
Russia (Narudinov)	0	1	0	1	0	1	0	X	3
Norway (Kverne)	1	0	3	0	1	0	2	X	7

Sheet B	1	2	3	4	5	6	7	8	9	Final
England (Summers)	2	0	0	0	1	2	1	0	0	6
Denmark (Neergaard)	0	3	1	1	0	0	0	1	1	7

Sheet C	1	2	3	4	5	6	7	8	Final
New Zealand (Frauenlob)	2	0	3	0	2	0	2	X	9
Sweden (Westerberg)	0	1	0	1	0	2	0	X	4

Sheet D	1	2	3	4	5	6	7	8	Final
Turkey (Şırınkan)	0	0	1	1	0	0	1	X	3
Hungary (Palancsa)	1	2	0	0	2	3	0	X	8

=== Group C ===
==== Saturday, April 18 ====
Draw 4 20:45

Sheet A	1	2	3	4	5	6	7	8	Final
Slovakia (Marček)	0	0	0	1	0	1	0	X	2
Finland (Meranen)	1	2	2	0	3	0	4	X	12

Sheet B	1	2	3	4	5	6	7	8	Final
Australia (Millikin)	0	0	2	0	0	0	0	X	2
Switzerland (Signer)	1	1	0	1	1	1	1	X	6

Sheet C	1	2	3	4	5	6	7	8	Final
Germany (Burba)	0	2	0	3	1	0	3	X	9
Poland (Janowski)	2	0	1	0	0	1	0	X	4

Sheet E	1	2	3	4	5	6	7	8	Final
France (Adam)	0	0	1	0	1	0	0	X	2
United States (Sieg)	1	1	0	5	0	0	3	X	10

==== Sunday, April 19 ====
Draw 6 12:00

Sheet A	1	2	3	4	5	6	7	8	Final
Switzerland (Signer)	2	1	3	2	3	1	X	X	12
Poland (Janowski)	0	0	0	0	0	0	X	X	0

Sheet B	1	2	3	4	5	6	7	8	Final
Germany (Burba)	0	0	1	0	0	1	0	X	2
United States (Sieg)	0	0	0	1	1	0	3	X	5

Sheet D	1	2	3	4	5	6	7	8	Final
Slovakia (Marček)	0	0	1	1	3	1	0	0	6
France (Adam)	1	1	0	0	0	0	1	1	4

Sheet E	1	2	3	4	5	6	7	8	Final
Australia (Millikin)	2	2	0	3	0	0	0	1	8
Finland (Meranen)	0	0	2	0	2	2	1	0	7

==== Monday, April 20 ====
Draw 9 8:00

Sheet D	1	2	3	4	5	6	7	8	Final
United States (Sieg)	1	0	2	0	1	0	3	X	7
Switzerland (Signer)	0	1	0	0	0	2	0	X	3

Sheet E	1	2	3	4	5	6	7	8	Final
Finland (Meranen)	0	1	0	6	3	2	2	X	14
Poland (Janowski)	5	0	1	0	0	0	0	X	6

Draw 10 12:00

Sheet C	1	2	3	4	5	6	7	8	Final
France (Adam)	0	0	0	0	1	0	X	X	1
Australia (Millikin)	2	0	1	3	0	4	X	X	10

Sheet E	1	2	3	4	5	6	7	8	Final
Slovakia (Marček)	0	0	0	0	1	0	0	X	1
Germany (Burba)	3	0	1	1	0	0	1	X	6

Draw 12 20:00

Sheet C	1	2	3	4	5	6	7	8	Final
Slovakia (Marček)	1	1	0	0	0	2	0	X	4
Switzerland (Signer)	0	0	4	2	2	0	2	X	10

Sheet D	1	2	3	4	5	6	7	8	Final
France (Adam)	0	1	0	2	0	2	1	1	7
Poland (Janowski)	2	0	2	0	1	0	0	0	5

==== Tuesday, April 21 ====
Draw 13 8:00

Sheet A	1	2	3	4	5	6	7	8	Final
Australia (Millikin)	3	0	2	1	0	1	2	X	9
Germany (Burba)	0	2	0	0	1	0	0	X	3

Draw 14 12:00

Sheet C	1	2	3	4	5	6	7	8	Final
Finland (Meranen)	0	1	1	0	1	0	0	X	3
United States (Sieg)	2	0	0	3	0	0	2	X	7

Draw 15 16:00

Sheet E	1	2	3	4	5	6	7	8	Final
Germany (Burba)	0	1	0	1	1	1	0	2	6
Switzerland (Signer)	1	0	2	0	0	0	2	0	5

Draw 16 20:00

Sheet B	1	2	3	4	5	6	7	8	Final
France (Adam)	0	0	0	0	0	0	X	X	0
Finland (Meranen)	3	2	2	2	1	4	X	X	14

Sheet C	1	2	3	4	5	6	7	8	Final
Australia (Millikin)	3	0	4	0	3	3	X	X	13
Slovakia (Marček)	0	1	0	1	0	0	X	X	2

Sheet D	1	2	3	4	5	6	7	8	Final
Poland (Janowski)	0	0	0	0	0	0	X	X	0
United States (Sieg)	4	3	2	1	1	3	X	X	14

==== Wednesday, April 22 ====
Draw 19 16:00

Sheet A	1	2	3	4	5	6	7	8	Final
United States (Sieg)	0	2	0	1	0	4	1	X	8
Australia (Millikin)	1	0	2	0	2	0	0	X	5

Sheet B	1	2	3	4	5	6	7	8	Final
Slovakia (Marček)	0	1	3	0	2	0	3	X	9
Poland (Janowski)	1	0	0	2	0	1	0	X	4

Sheet D	1	2	3	4	5	6	7	8	Final
Finland (Meranen)	1	0	0	2	2	1	0	1	7
Germany (Burba)	0	3	1	0	0	0	1	0	5

Sheet E	1	2	3	4	5	6	7	8	Final
Switzerland (Signer)	1	2	2	2	1	0	1	X	9
France (Adam)	0	0	0	0	0	0	0	X	0

==== Thursday, April 23 ====
Draw 21 8:00

Sheet A	1	2	3	4	5	6	7	8	Final
Germany (Burba)	0	3	2	0	0	1	0	1	7
France (Adam)	2	0	0	1	2	0	1	0	6

Sheet B	1	2	3	4	5	6	7	8	Final
United States (Sieg)	0	3	3	0	2	1	0	X	9
Slovakia (Marček)	1	0	0	1	0	0	3	X	5

Sheet C	1	2	3	4	5	6	7	8	Final
Switzerland (Signer)	1	0	0	3	0	3	3	X	10
Finland (Meranen)	0	3	1	0	1	0	0	X	5

Sheet E	1	2	3	4	5	6	7	8	Final
Poland (Janowski)	1	0	1	1	0	0	1	0	4
Australia (Millikin)	0	1	0	0	2	1	0	1	5

== Tiebreaker ==
Friday, April 24, 9:00

Sheet C	1	2	3	4	5	6	7	8	Final
Ireland (Gray)	0	0	0	3	2	2	0	0	7
Czech Republic (Neznal)	1	2	0	0	0	0	1	2	6

== Playoffs ==
Qualification Game
A3	Ireland	7
C3	Australia	6

Quarterfinals
C1	United States	6
A3	Ireland	3
B2	New Zealand	5
C2	Switzerland	4
A1	Canada	9
B3	Sweden	3
A2	Scotland	4
B1	Denmark	5

Semifinals
C1	United States	9
B2	New Zealand	4
A1	Canada	5
B1	Denmark	3

Gold Medal Game
C1	United States	9
A1	Canada	4

Bronze Medal Game
B2	New Zealand	6
B1	Denmark	4

=== Qualification Game ===
Friday, April 24, 14:00

Sheet B	1	2	3	4	5	6	7	8	Final
Ireland (Gray)	0	0	2	1	0	1	0	3	7
Australia (Millikin)	1	2	0	0	1	0	2	0	6

=== Quarterfinals ===
Friday, April 24, 19:00

Sheet A	1	2	3	4	5	6	7	8	Final
United States (Sieg)	1	1	0	2	0	2	0	X	6
Ireland (Gray)	0	0	1	0	1	0	1	X	3

Sheet B	1	2	3	4	5	6	7	8	9	Final
New Zealand (Frauenlob)	0	2	0	0	1	0	1	0	1	5
Switzerland (Signer)	0	0	0	2	0	1	0	1	0	4

Sheet C	1	2	3	4	5	6	7	8	Final
Canada (O'Leary)	3	1	0	2	0	3	X	X	9
Sweden (Westerberg)	0	0	1	0	2	0	X	X	3

Sheet D	1	2	3	4	5	6	7	8	Final
Scotland (Muirhead)	1	1	0	1	0	0	1	0	4
Denmark (Neergaard)	0	0	2	0	1	1	0	1	5

=== Semifinals ===
Saturday, April 25, 8:00

Sheet C	1	2	3	4	5	6	7	8	Final
New Zealand (Frauenlob)	0	2	0	0	0	2	X	X	4
United States (Sieg)	3	0	1	1	4	0	X	X	9

Sheet A	1	2	3	4	5	6	7	8	Final
Denmark (Nielsen)	0	1	0	0	2	0	0	X	3
Canada (O'Leary)	2	0	0	1	0	2	0	X	5

=== Bronze medal game ===
Saturday, April 25, 13:00

Sheet D	1	2	3	4	5	6	7	8	Final
New Zealand (Frauenlob)	1	0	1	0	0	3	0	1	6
Denmark (Nielsen)	0	1	0	1	1	0	1	0	4

=== Gold medal game ===
Saturday, April 25, 13:00

Sheet B	1	2	3	4	5	6	7	8	Final
Canada (O'Leary)	0	0	1	0	0	3	0	X	4
United States (Sieg)	1	2	0	1	2	0	3	X	9
