= Ian Craig (footballer) =

Australian rules footballer

Personal information
- Full name: Ian Craig
- Born: 23 October 1952
- Died: 28 September 1982 (aged 29)
- Original team: Spotswood
- Height: 175 cm (5 ft 9 in)
- Weight: 80 kg (176 lb)

Playing career^{1}
Years	Club	Games (Goals)
1970–71	Richmond	5 (0)
- ^{1} Playing statistics correct to the end of 1971.

Ian Craig (23 October 1952 – 28 September 1982) was a former Australian rules footballer who played with Richmond in the Victorian Football League (VFL).
