= Corex Process =

Direct reduced iron production process

The Corex Process is a smelting reduction process created by Primetals Technologies as a more environmentally friendly alternative to the blast furnace. Presently, the majority of steel production is through the blast furnace which has to rely on coking coal and requires a sinter plant in order to prepare the iron ore for reduction. Unlike the blast furnace, smelting reduction processes are typical smaller and use coal and oxygen directly to reduce iron ore into a usable product.

Smelting reduction processes come in two basic varieties, two-stage or single-stage. In a single-stage system the iron ore is both reduced and melted in the same container. In a two-stage process, like Corex, the ore is reduced in one shaft and melted and purified in another. Plants using the Corex process have been put use in areas such as South Africa, India, and China. First COREX process was installed in 1988 at South Africa.

== Process ==
The Corex process consists of two main parts: a Reduction Shaft and a Melter-Gasifier. The main reagents for the Corex process are iron ore, non-coking coal, and oxygen. Unlike a blast furnace, the Corex process does not use a hot blast of nitrogen, thereby greatly reducing NOx gas emissions, but instead uses oxygen. In addition, the Corex process can use iron oxides containing up to 80% lump ore and uses non-coking coal directly as a reducing agent.

In the reduction shaft the iron ore, along with limestone and dolomite additives, is added and then reduced by reduction gas into 95% direct reduced iron, DRI. The DRI is then redirected via six discharge screws into the melter-gasifier. The melter-gasifier has three main sections, the gaseous free board zone, the char bed, and the hearth zone, and it has an effect on several stages in the process. First it serves to create the reduction gas by gasifying the coal with oxygen and then cooling it. After being reduced, the DRI is redirected to the char bed where the iron and slag are melted and then directed to the hearth zone. The heat inside the metal gasifier keeps the amount of phenols small, keeping them out of the atmosphere. Meanwhile, carbon monoxide and hydrogen gas from the original gasification of the coal exit the gasifier while other byproducts are captured in the metallic slag. The rest of the hot gas is then cooled and sent into the reduction shaft resulting in the Corex export gas which is used to control pressure in the plant. Many of the gases resulting from this process can then be recycled or used to produce electricity. Dust particles also appear in these gases and the melter-gasifier recycles them with four dust burners.

== Advantages ==
There are many advantages to the Corex Process, for example carbon dioxide emissions are up to 20% lower than with the conventional blast furnace, and the Corex process produces far less SO2 and dust than the blast furnace. In addition Corex plants do not release as many phenols or sulfides limiting water contamination.

== Disadvantages ==
There are drawbacks. For example, at the JSW Steel plant in India it was found that to be viable the Corex process still needed about 15% coke. Furthermore, it has also been found that Corex plants require large amounts of oxygen which can be expensive. Also the export gas can make the process highly inefficient. However, this particular problem can be mitigated by using the export gas in electricity production.
