= Willis Jackson, Baron Jackson of Burnley =

British electrical engineer (1904–1970)

The Right Honourable The Lord Jackson of Burnley
- Born: 29 October 1904
- Died: 17 February 1970 (aged 65)
- Education: University of Manchester; University of Oxford
- Awards: Fellow of the Royal Society (1953)
- Scientific career
- Workplaces: UMIST; Imperial College London

Willis Jackson, Baron Jackson of Burnley FRS (29 October 1904 – 17 February 1970) was a British technologist and electrical engineer.

== Background and education ==
Born in Burnley, he was the only son of Herbert Jackson and his wife Annie Hiley. Jackson was educated at Rosegrove Primary School and the Burnley Grammar School until 1922 and read electrical engineering at the University of Manchester until 1925. He obtained a Bachelor of Science first class, having previously won three different scholarships. Jackson studied then under Robert Beattie, graduating with a Master of Science in 1926.

Jackson was awarded a number of honorary degrees. Doctor of Science degrees were awarded by the Swiss Federal Institute of Technology Zurich, by the University of Bristol and by City University London.

He was made an honorary Doctor of Engineering by the University of Sheffield and received a Doctor of Laws from the University of Aberdeen as well as from the University of Leeds in 1967. He was granted an honorary fellowship by the City and Guilds of London Institute and by the Institution of Electrical Engineers in 1968. That same year, the University of Dundee conferred upon him another honorary degree and he was elected a fellow by the Royal College of Art.

In 1961, he presented the Bernard Price Memorial Lecture in South Africa, and on 21 November 1963 delivered the Tenth Fawley Foundation Lecture.

== Vocational career ==
After his education, Jackson became lecturer in electrical engineering first at the Bradford Technical College (now the University of Bradford) until 1929. In the following year he worked as apprentice for the electrical company Metropolitan-Vickers. Jackson lectured at the UMIST from 1930 and subsequently at The Queen's College, Oxford, from 1933.

He graduated as Doctor of Philosophy at the University of Oxford and as Doctor of Science at Manchester in 1936. Afterwards he became again employed at Vickers working as research engineer for the next two years and then obtained a professorship in electrotechnics at his former university. In 1946, he moved to Imperial College London as professor for electrical engineering. Jackson was elected a fellow of the Royal Society in 1953 and joined again Vickers as director of its research and education department, a post he held until 1961.

Jackson was knighted in 1958. He served as president of the Institution of Electrical Engineers in the following two years until 1960 and after another year became president of the Association of Supervising Electrical Engineers. For four years Jackson chaired the governing body of the Royal Technical Institute, Salford (now the University of Salford) until 1962. He returned to the Imperial College in 1961, heading its Department of Electrical Engineering until his death in 1970; for the last three years he was the College's pro-rector. In 1962 he entered the South Eastern Electricity Board. He gave the 1967 presidential address (Science, Technology and Society) to the British Association meeting in Leeds. He published a number of books and journal articles on his research.

== Political career ==
In 1944 Jackson was appointed to the Radio Research Board of the Department of Scientific and Industrial Research in which he sat for four years; he served another term from 1950. He was a member of the Central Advisory Council to the Ministry of Education from 1945 and of the Scientific Advisory Council to the Ministry of Supply from 1947. A year later Jackson was admitted to BBC's Engineering Advisory Committee and in 1951 to the Committee of Selection to the Commonwealth Fund Fellowships.

He became a member of the Royal Commission on the Civil Service in 1953. Two years later in 1955 Jackson joined the University Grants Committee, whose membership he held for a decade. In the same year he sat in the Ministry of Education's Council of Technological Awards. Jackson was nominated a chairman of the Ministry's Committee on Supply and Training of Technical Teachers in 1956. He chaired the FBI Research Committee of 1958 and became a member of the Committee on Management of Research, run by the Lord President of the Council.

In September 1961, he was invited to the Advisory Council on Scientific Policy and to the Scientific Manpower Committee. Jackson was chosen president of the British Association for Commercial and Industrial Education in 1962 and entered the Advisory Council for Technical Education for Overseas Countries. He received a life peerage with the title Baron Jackson of Burnley, of Burnley, in the County Palatine of Lancaster on 19 January 1967.

== Awards and honours ==
Jackson was elected a Fellow of the Royal Society in 1953, his nomination reads.

Jackson's work has been devoted, mainly, to correlating the electrical behaviour of dielectric materials with their chemical composition and physical structure through studies of the mechanisms of energy-loss and breakdown under alternating electric stress, and to developing new techniques of measurement for investigation of these properties at cm. And mm. wave-lengths. This work is directly related to his studies of the behaviour of transmission lines and wave-guides, and of their applications in radar and communication systems: here his investigations on polythene and barium titanate ceramics are of outstanding importance.

He was elected to Membership of the Manchester Literary and Philosophical Society in 1942.

== Personal life ==
In 1938 he married Mary, daughter of Robert Oliphant Boswall, a lecturer in mechanical engineering; they had two daughters.

One of Jackson's closest friends was the physicist John F. Allen. In his last years he supported the development of the Indian Institutes of Technology.
