= Corex UK =

UK-based technology company

COREX UK Ltd. is a technology company that specialized in core analysis – analyzing rock conditions and formations associated with more efficient drilling in conjunction with hydrocarbon exploration.

The company was headquartered in Aberdeen and had laboratories in Egypt, Libya, the United Arab Emirates and Kazakhstan, and worked with labs in Colombia, India, Malaysia and Spain.

In December 2016, the company was acquired by Premier Oilfield Laboratories.
