= The Gospel of Corax =

1996 novel by Paul Park

- First edition
- Author: Paul Park
- Language: English
- Genre: Historical fiction
- Publisher: Soho Press
- Publication date: 1996
- Publication place: United States
- Pages: ???
- ISBN: 1-56947-061-8
- OCLC: 33664475
- Dewey Decimal: 813/.54 20
- LC Class: PS3566.A6745 G67 1996

The Gospel of Corax is a 1996 novel by Paul Park about an escaped Roman slave (Corax) who travels from Caesarea to India with a burly Essene man named Jeshua.

The novel is a suggestion of a historical Jesus' whereabouts during his "disappearance" from the historical record between childhood and his thirties. This is based on the theory (first postulated by Nicolas Notovitch) that the historical Jesus travelled to India.

According to a review in In Newsweekly:

Corax is an ex-slave on the lamb in this interesting first-person narrative. He lives in Roman society at a time when professional skills – literacy, chemistry, medicine, surgery and astronomy – were sometimes the province of well-kept slaves rather than free citizens. These same skills serve Corax well in his trek across the ancient Middle East as he plays many roles to keep his freedom and his life. Whether he's acting as a thief and prostitute or a healer and diplomat, Corax's story is sprinkled with satisfying historical, practical, and metaphysical commentary.

== See also ==
- Paul Park
- Jesus
