= Janne Corax =

Swedish cyclist, mountaineer and explorer

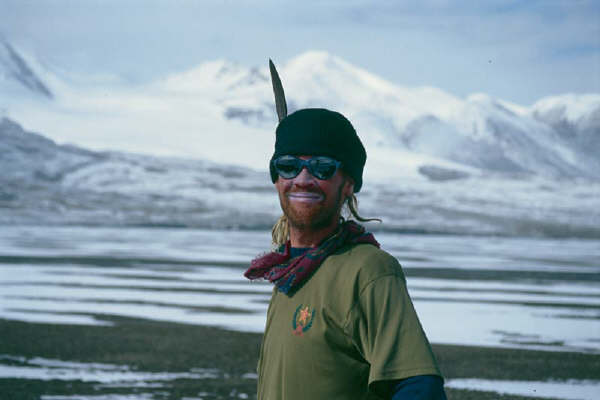
- Janne Corax with the Kunlun range in the background.
- Born: 1967 (age 57–58); Sweden
- Known for: Cycling in Tibet

Janne Corax (born 1967) is a Swedish cyclist, mountaineer and explorer. He has traveled in 110 countries and cycled more than 82,500 km. He lives in Målilla in southern Sweden.

In 2003 he and Nadine Saulnier made a cycle crossing of the uninhabited and trackless 5,000-metre-high Chang Tang plateau of Northern Tibet. The crossing resulted in a short film, Too Tired, which was part of the series "Into The Unknown" on National Geographic's international channel. Corax wrote an article about his crossing in the Japanese Alpine News.

During later trips in Tibet, Corax claimed the first ascents of several 6,000-metre Tibetan mountains.
