= Hendrik van der Bijl =

South African electrical engineer and industrialist (1887–1948)

Hendrik Johannes van der Bijl
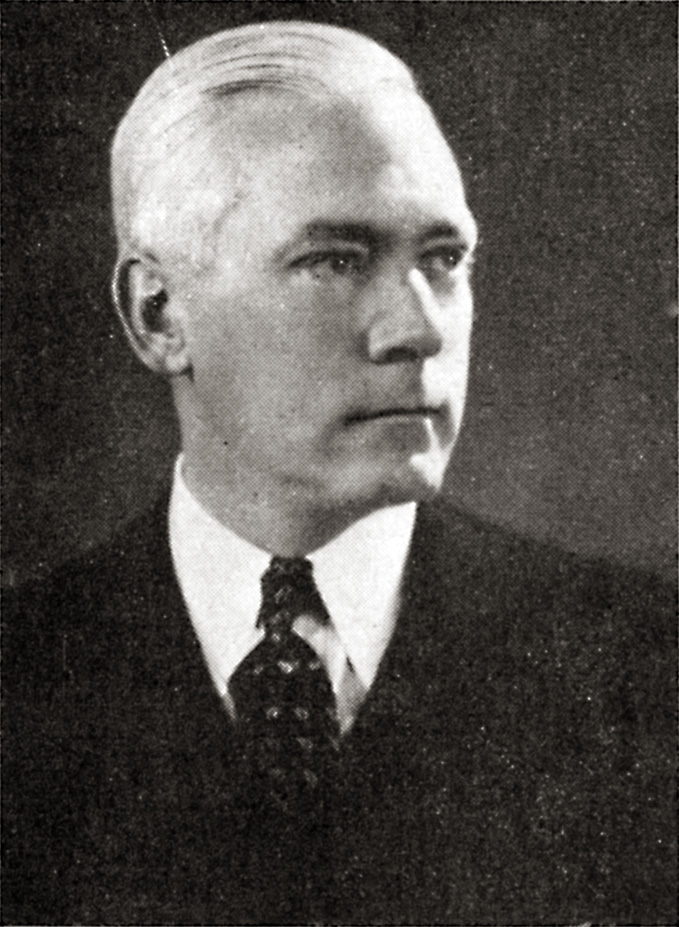
- Born: 23 November 1887; Pretoria
- Died: 2 December 1948 (aged 61); Johannesburg
- Citizenship: South African
- Education: Leipzig University, Germany
- Spouses: Florence Wagner (m. 1915) Ethel Buxton (m. 1942)
- Awards: Fellow of the Royal Society
- Scientific career
- Fields: Electrical engineering
- Workplaces: Western Electric; Eskom; ISCOR; University of Pretoria
- Thesis: The behaviour of ionized liquid dielectrics during the passage of electric currents (1912)

Hendrik Johannes van der Bijl FRS (23 November 1887 – 2 December 1948) was a South African electrical engineer and industrialist and is regarded as one of the greatest South Africans for his contribution to the country's development. He was the driving force behind the establishment of the South African electricity utility company Eskom and the South African Steel and Iron Corporation ISCOR.

== Early life and education ==
Van der Bijl was born on 23 November 1887 in Pretoria to Pieter Gerhard van der Bijl and Hester Elizabeth Groenewald. He was the fifth of eight children. Pieter van der Bijl had been an ox-wagon driver between Cape Town and Kimberley and moved to Pretoria in 1887 where he became a prosperous grain and produce merchant. Pieter van der Bijl was acquainted with high-profile politicians such as Louis Botha and Jan Smuts.

After the ill-fated Jameson Raid (1895) there was increased tension in the Transvaal Republic, of which Pretoria was the capital, and the young Van der Bijl assisted his father in stacking rifles and ammunition collected by the Boer forces in preparation for further British attacks. He was thirteen and attending the Staatsch Model School in Pretoria when the second Anglo-Boer War broke out. He witnessed the occupation of Pretoria by the British armed forces and he was forced to leave the school as it was converted into a concentration camp.

In 1902 Pieter van der Bijl moved his family to Gordon's Bay in Cape Town where Hendrik attended a farm school in Sir Lowry's Pass and later Boy's High School in Franschhoek. He matriculated in 1904 and went to Victoria College (now Stellenbosch University) where he completed his BA with distinctions in Physics, Mathematics and Chemistry. He received the college prize for physics and the Van der Horst Prize for "most deserving student of mathematics and physical science at the College."

In 1908 Van der Bijl went to Germany where he studied physics. He spent one semester at Halle and then moved to Leipzig University where he was supervised by Wiener, des Coudres and Jaffé.

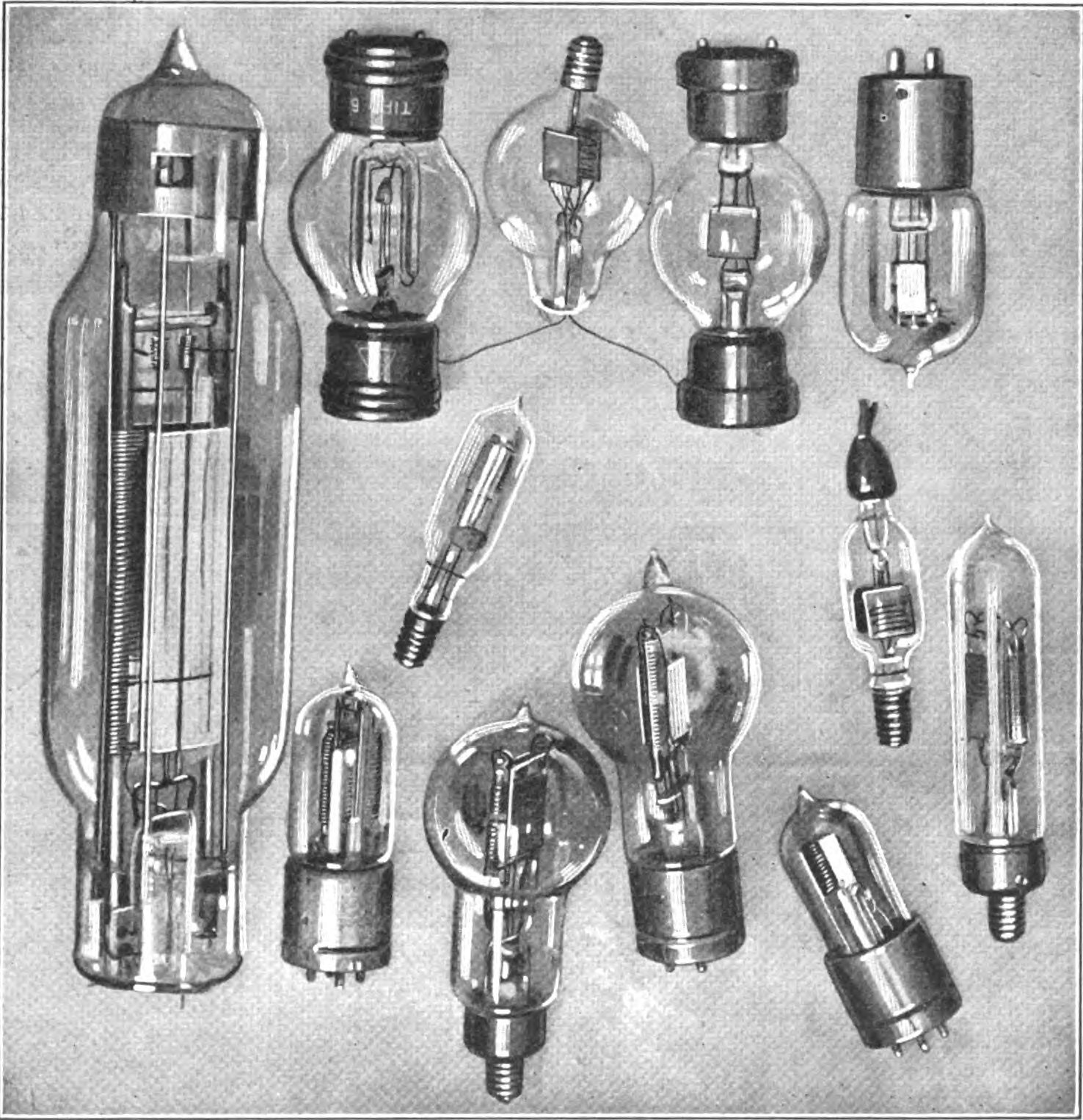
Collection of early triode vacuum tubes belonging to American inventor Lee De Forest, the inventor of the triode, from 1920 (Picture from: Hendrik van der Bijl "Practical operation of thermionic detectors" in Scientific American )

He studied ions produced by a strong Radium source moving through a dielectric liquid, the results of which verified the equation:

$${dn \over dt}= q - \alpha n^2$$

and its description of the behaviour of such ions.

He obtained his PhD in March 1912 and was appointed assistant in physics at the Königlich Sächsische Technische Hochschule in Dresden, where he worked under Wilhelm Hallwachs. While there he met Robert Andrews Millikan, who arranged for him to work the following year at Western Electric in New York at what would become part of the Bell Telephone Company (in 1925).

In April 1913 he published a paper on the research he had conducted in Dresden on the photoelectric effect entitled "Zur Bestimmung der Erstenergien lichtelektrisch ausgelöster Elektronen" [The Determination of the Initial Energies of Photoelectrically Liberated Electrons].

During the seven years he spent in New York, he studied the performance of the first three-electrode thermionic valve, known as the "Audion", developed by Lee de Forest. His research, assisted by H.D. Arnold, led to the installation of the first Audion as a repeater on the New York to San Francisco telephone line. In 1915 he co-developed the master oscillator circuit that was used with the Audion for wireless communication between New York and Wilmington, Delaware; and between Paris, France and Honolulu, Hawaii.

Van der Bijl published the design and theory of the devices he worked on in a book, The Thermionic Vacuum Tube-Physics and Electronics in 1920. It became the standard textbook on the subject for more than 20 years. He is now perhaps best remembered for the van der Bijl equation which describes the relationship of the three 'constants' of a vacuum tube, the transconductance g_{m}, the gain μ and the plate resistance r_{p} or r_{a}. The van der Bijl equation defines their relationship as follows:

$g_m = {\mu \over r_p}$

In 1919, Van der Bijl wrote a paper on Scientific research and industrial development and related this to the development of secondary industries in South Africa. As a result of this paper, he was invited to return to South Africa by Jan Smuts and was offered the position of Scientific and Industrial Advisor in the Department of Mines and Industries. He took up Smuts' offer in 1920 and returned to South Africa.

== Career in South Africa ==
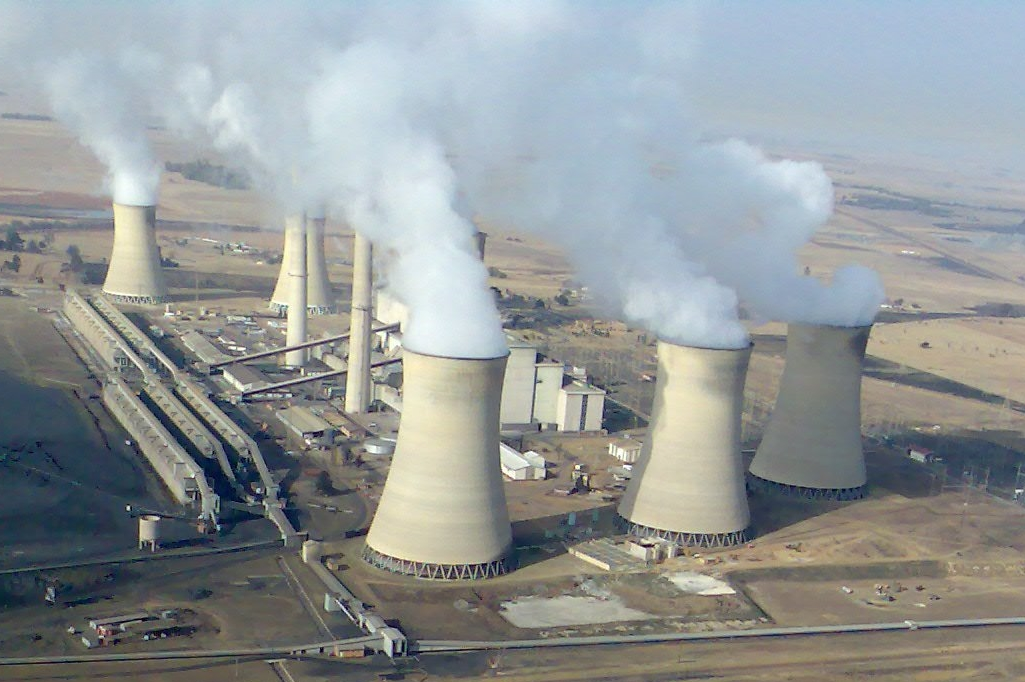
One of Eskom's coal-fired power stations, Arnot

Van der Bijl realised the advantages of a state-controlled company with capital provided by the state but run on commercial lines as a public concern. His first task was the creation of the Electricity Supply Commission (ESCOM, later to become Eskom), of which he became the founding chairman in 1922 and stayed until his death in 1948. ESCOM was created to supply electricity throughout South Africa but in particular to the mines, industries and the electrification of the railways. It was a commercial success, South Africa was assured of sufficient inexpensive power for its fast-growing industries and ESCOM was able to pay back the state loan after 10 years.

His next major task was the establishment of the Iron and Steel Corporation of South Africa (ISCOR) as a type of public utility, and he became its chairman from 1925. At that time there was a lack of people knowledgeable in the manufacture of steel in South Africa. Van der Bijl overcame this obstacle by appointing a committee of international iron and steel experts from Britain, America, Germany and Sweden who arranged for the training of South Africans, who had completed their BSc degrees in engineering, at steelworks in Britain, Germany, Holland, Sweden, USA and Canada. ISCOR was also a commercial success and provided inexpensive steel for South Africa from 1934.

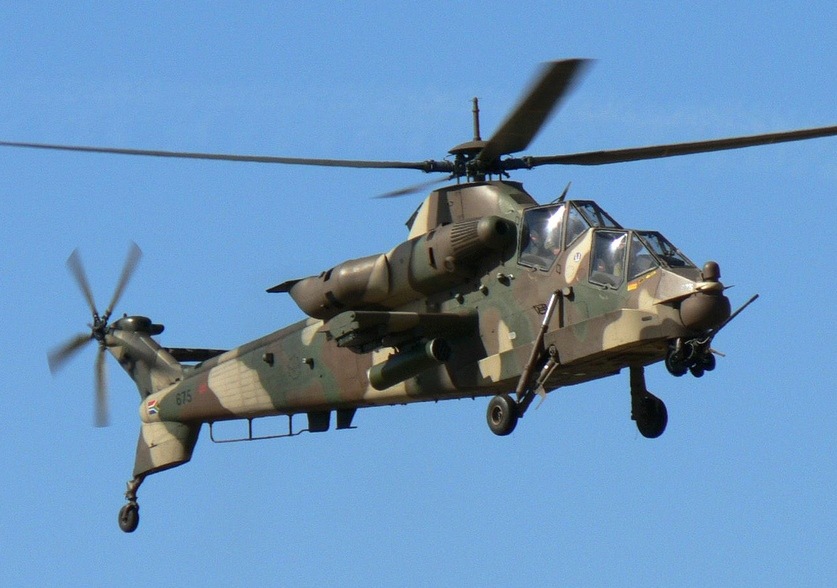
Rooivalk attack helicopter produced by ARMSCOR

During the Second World War he was appointed as Director-General of War Supplies and subsequently Director of Supplies in the forerunner of the Armaments Corporation of South Africa (ARMSCOR). South Africa was an important supplier of spares, guns, ammunition, bombs, armoured cars, clothing, boots, blankets and canned foods to the Allies.

He had a hand in establishing more than a dozen South African institutions including:

- 1937, The African Metals Corporation (AMCOR, not to be confused with the Canadian company of the same name)
- 1940, The Industrial Development Corporation of South Africa, which provides funding and technical assistance to industrial ventures.
- 1946, Safmarine, the international shipping business, that was established to provide a shipping route between the US and the Union of South Africa.

== Recognition and awards ==
- 27 January 1927, President of the South African Institute of Electrical Engineers (SAIEE).
- 1934 - 1948, Chancellor of the University of Pretoria.
- 1944, Fellow of the Royal Society
- Foreign Associate of the National Academy of Sciences
- Honorary member of the Koninklijk Instituut van Ingenieurs
- The city of Vanderbijlpark, where ISCOR's major steel works was built and still operates, is named after him.
- The Hendrik Van Der Bijl Primary School in Emfuleni is also named after him.
- The Hendrik Van Der Bijl award is an annual prize awarded to recognise outstanding science projects at the annual Eskom Expo for Young Scientists and covers science, technology, engineering, mathematics and innovation.
- The Hendrik Van Der Bijl memorial lecture is presented by the Faculty of Engineering, Built Environment and Information Technology of the University of Pretoria.
- PhD (Honoris causa) from University of Stellenbosch
- PhD (Honoris causa) from University of Cape Town

== Personal life ==
In 1915 Van der Bijl married Florence Wagner, an American who he met as a music student in Germany. They did not have any children. His second wife was Ethel Buxton, whom he married in 1942 and they had a son and two daughters.

He died on 2 December 1948 from cancer.

== See also ==
- Eskom
- Armscor (South Africa)

== Sources ==
- Crouch, M: The First Ten Decades: The History of the SAIEE, 1909-2009, Chris van Rensburg Publications, 2009, p. 32, ISBN 0-86846-110-5
- Rosenthal, E: Southern African Dictionary of National Biography, Frederick Warne and Co. Ltd, 1966, pp. 389–390, Library of Congress Catalog Card Number 66-15690

Academic offices
Preceded by Adriaan Louw	Chancellor of the University of Pretoria; 1934– 1948	Succeeded by Charles Theodore Te Water

Preceded by New position	Chairperson of Eskom Board; 1922–1948	Succeeded by Jacobs, A.M.
