= Ian Craig (English cricketer) =

English cricketer (1931–2015)

Personal information
- Full name: Ian Thornton Craig
- Born: 26 January 1931; Maidstone, Kent, England
- Died: 6 December 2015 (aged 84)
- Batting: Right-handed
- Bowling: Right-arm fast-medium

Domestic team information
- Years: Team
- 1959: Minor Counties
- 1955–1959: Cambridgeshire

Career statistics
Competition	First-class
Matches	1
Runs scored	1
Batting average	1.00
100s/50s	–/–
Top score	1
Balls bowled	192
Wickets	2
Bowling average	42.50
5 wickets in innings	–
10 wickets in match	–
Best bowling	2/46
Catches/stumpings	–/–
- Source: Cricinfo, 29 April 2012

Ian Thornton Craig (26 January 1931 – 6 December 2015) was an English cricketer. He was a right-handed batsman who bowled right-arm medium-fast.

== Biography ==
Craig was born in Maidstone, Kent, on 26 January 1931. He made his debut in county cricket for Cambridgeshire in the 1955 Minor Counties Championship against Lincolnshire. From 1955 to 1959, Craig made 21 appearances for Cambridgeshire in the Minor Counties Championship, with his final appearance coming against Bedfordshire. In 1959, he made his only appearance in first-class cricket for a combined Minor Counties team against the touring Indians at Longton Cricket Club Ground, Stoke-on-Trent. Batting first, the Indians scored 287 all out in their first-innings, during which Craig took the wickets of Arvind Apte and Pankaj Roy, finishing the innings with figures of 2/46. The Minor Counties responded with 228 all out in their first-innings, during which Craig, who batted at number nine, was dismissed for a single run by A. G. Kripal Singh. The Indians then made 274/7 declared in their second-innings, during which he bowled 15 wicketless overs. The Minor Counties then successfully chased down their target, reaching 334/4 to win by six wickets and hand the team a famous victory.

Craig died on 6 December 2015, aged 84.
