= Think Finance =

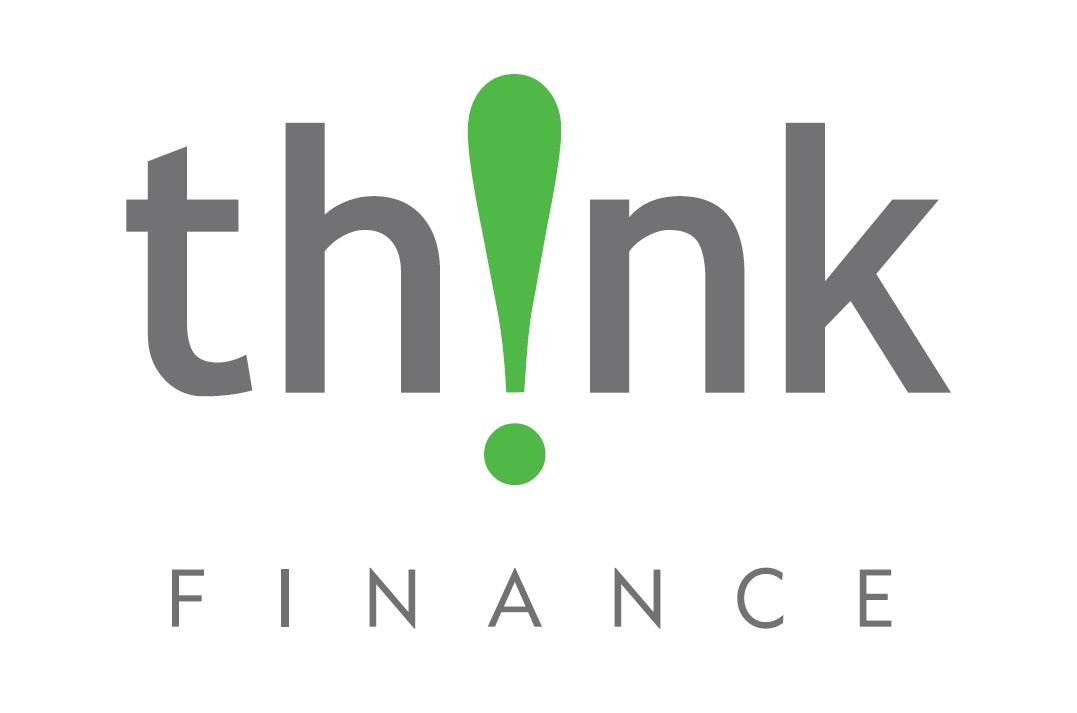
- Type: Private company
- Industry: Financial Technology
- Founded: 2001
- Defunct: 2019
- Fate: Bankrupt
- Headquarters: Irving, Texas, United States
- Products: Cortex
- Number of employees: 181 (2016)
- Website: www.thinkfinance.com

Think Finance was an American company that provided technology, analytics, and marketing services to financial businesses in the consumer lending industry. It operated from 2011 until it went bankrupt in 2019.

== History ==
=== Foundation ===
Think Finance was founded in 2001 in Fort Worth, Texas. The company was last headed by Martin J. Wong, who served as the company’s Chief Executive Officer since May 2014.

=== Growth 2014-2016 ===
In 2014, Think Finance restructured its business by spinning off its consumer lending products portfolio into a new independent company, called Elevate. Following the restructuring, Think Finance’s business model changed to being a provider of analytics and technology services to third-party online lenders.

=== Bankruptcy ===
In late 2019, Think Finance emerged from Chapter 11 bankruptcy proceedings and reorganized its company structure. The Think Finance name and company were dissolved. While its subsidiaries continue to operate, they are no longer under the umbrella of Think Finance.

== Products and services ==
Think Finance’s main product was Cortex, a suite of technology and services which helps lenders market, originate, service and manage online loans.

== Recognition ==
In 2013, Think Finance was ranked #2 on the Forbes List of America’s Most Promising Companies. In its ranking, Forbes cited Think Finance’s innovation in "applying new technology to stagnant business models" resulting in growth that outperformed traditional banks.

From 2010-2015, Think was an Honoree on the Inc. 5000 List of the Fastest Growing Companies. Inc. Magazine noted the company’s 3 year growth rate of 216%, as well as surpassing $687 million in revenue in 2013. Inc. describes Think Finance as a company that “develops next-generation products for under-served consumers using a technology and analytics platform to bridge the gap between payday loans and credit cards.”
