= Corex =

Cough syrup sold by Pfizer Inc.

Corex is a cough syrup sold by Pfizer Inc. It is available in India, Pakistan, Bangladesh and a few other South Asian countries. Corex is a prescribed medicine. Its active ingredients are chlorpheniramine maleate and codeine phosphate.

== Mechanism of action ==
Chlorpheniramine maleate, an H1-blocking antihistamine, relieves histamine-induced allergic edema of respiratory mucosa. Codeine phosphate, by its action on the cough center in the medulla, helps reduce excessive frequency and intensity of cough bouts, which allows the patient to rest or sleep.

== Legal status ==
Legally, Corex can only be obtained by a physician's prescription, but studies show that more than 90% of the product is sold without one.

Corex is not generally a fatal drug substitute, unless taken in extremely high quantities. However, many side effects are common. Corex is known to cause short term memory loss, sleeplessness, tremors and spasms. Muscular pains and dehydration are other common side-effects.

Long term abuse leads to serious kidney damage or constipation. Corex has a high sugar content, and may be unsuitable for acute diabetic patients.

== General references ==
1. "LPD-Corex Dx syrup version 3.0.pdf" (PDF). Pfizer Inc. Oct 14, 2013.
