= Mittal Steel South Africa =

Steel manufacturer in South Africa

ArcelorMittal South Africa is part of the steel company ArcelorMittal. The company was originally Iscor Ltd., a South African parastatal steel company. It was founded in 1928 and was first listed on the JSE Securities Exchange in 1989.

In January 2025 it announced that it would be shutting down steel operations in Newcastle and Vereeniging.

== History ==
=== Establishment of the company ===
Hendrik van der Bijl, one of the most influential South Africans of the twentieth century, together with Dr. Fredrik "Frikkie" Meyer, (a student of Albert Einstein while studying in Berlin), and others, were the main driving force behind the establishment of the South African Iron and Steel Industrial Corp. (Iscor).

Iscor, with its first works in Pretoria built by the German Demag, was established as a state company in terms of the Iron and Steel Industry Act, No. 11 of 1928. The objectives of establishing the company were to produce iron and a range of steel products, and to create employment opportunities.

Production at the Pretoria plant started in 1934. On 4 April 1934 the first steel was tapped from the open-hearth furnace at the Pretoria Works. Wartime needs for steel and the local manufacture of numerous necessities brought about a sharp increase in demand. Iscor had to expand, and the Pretoria works had reached their limit of growth.

In 1941 Dr. van der Bijl and his fellow directors decided that expansion in a new area had become necessary. The idea of a new steelworks in Vereeniging was revived. For the immediate war needs it was decided to begin by building a plate rolling mill planned in such a way that it could later form part of a large integrated steelworks.

The situation of the terrain along the Vaal River west of Vereeniging made it ideal for development. There was sufficient slope for drainage towards the river and the area was downstream from the Rand Water Board's pumping station intake. The heavy industries could be suitably sited on relatively high ground in a position where the prevailing winds would minimise the dangers of pollution. Dr. van der Bijl convinced the directors of Iscor that the area beside the Vaal River was the obvious site for Iscor's new steelworks.

After the discovery of iron ore at Thabazimbi, the African Metals Corp. (Amcor) was established near Vereeniging in 1937. The erection of the Plate Mill was completed in 1943 and went into production the same year. Iscor started trading in 1947.

Directly after World War II, it was decided to build a fully integrated steel works at Vanderbijlpark, and a start was made on this early in 1947. On 4 October 1952 the Vanderbijlpark Works officially opened by His Excellency the Governor General, Dr E.G. Jansen. Several of the new production units started up in 1953, followed by major expansion schemes in 1956, 1960. From 1964 to 1969 a second development phase started at Vanderbijlpark Works. Large extensions were added; older plants modernised to supply higher quality and value-added products such as electrolytic tinplate for the canning and beverage industries.

On 17 May 1969 the South African Government decided that Iscor's third fully integrated steelworks be erected at Newcastle. The main factor leading to this selection was to decentralise industry away from the Witwatersrand complex and to promote industrial development in Natal, the best watered province of South Africa. Newcastle, as a border area with an adequate supply of labour, and with the Amcor ironworks that could be taken over to save on initial capital costs as well as to provide an outlet for the iron which was at that time being exported to Yawata in Japan ( the contract for which was to expire shortly), was therefore chosen.

Further factors were that Newcastle was situated on main rail and road routes between Johannesburg and Durban, essential services such as water and electricity were already well catered for, and the town had a basic established infrastructure with a settled community. While ore would have to be transported 1 000 km from Sishen, coking coal was available from nearby and the overall economics were favourable. It was decided that both profile and flat products would be catered for in a plant with an ultimate capacity of 8 million tons per annum of liquid steel. Subsequent changes in steel markets has meant that extension to flat products has been delayed indefinitely and the current capacity is about 2,00 million tons of liquid steel.

From 1972 to 1977 the largest expansion period for Vanderbijlpark Works followed. Iron making facilities were extended and the steel making processes modernised by the commissioning of basic oxygen furnaces and electric arc furnaces. A colour coating line established at the South Works and a whole new works – the North Works was established to manufacture wide hot-rolled, cold-rolled and galvanised products.

1981 saw the corporation arriving at important decisions on future strategy. The looming shortage of scrap in the country and shortage of high grade coking coals led to the decision to place an order for a coal based kiln type direct reduction plant of 720 000 tons/annum at Vanderbijlpark Works.

The metallurgical plants at Pretoria were very old, uneconomic and, caused pollution; it was thus decided to phase out the coke ovens, blast furnaces and steel conversion plants, and to replace these with a new facility initially based on scrap and electric arc furnaces with the later addition of an iron making plant. Certain of the obsolete rolling mills would also be closed down and the overall works steel making capacity would be reduced to about 900 000 tons of liquid steel/annum.

The world steel industry entered a crisis period during the end of the 1970s and early 1980s with the widespread recession, which occurred at that time. South Africa did not escape this recession and the local demand for steel fell as a result. A world oversupply situation occurred in the steel market with export prices falling to uneconomic levels. During 1982 Iscor was thus forced into the early closure of the two oldest blast furnaces at Pretoria Works, as well as the closure of the so-called South Works at Newcastle which had been taken over from Amcor only a decade earlier.

Date	Event
1911	15 November – Registration of The Union Steel Corp. of SA Ltd.
1913	1 September – Casting of South Africa's first steel at USCO.
1916	Pretoria Works commissioned
1916	Vereeniging Works commissioned. The Transvaal Blast Furnace Co. Ltd. is formed.A blast furnace is erected in Vereeniging.
1920	March – Newcastle Works commissioned. A public company – the Newcastle Iron & Steel Works Ltd. formed.
1928	South African Iron and Steel Industry Act, No. 11 of 1928 passed. 5 June – The South African Iron and Steel Industrial Corp. constituted under the Act. Iscor founded as a statutory parastatal.
1934	4 April – The first steel is tapped from the open-hearth furnace at the Pretoria Works.
1937	The African Metals Corp. (Amcor) established near Vereeniging.
1942	Iscor company established to meet the increasing demand for steel in South Africa.
1943	Commissioning of a plate mill at Vanderbijlpark Works.
1942	Acquisition of a site of 97 square kilometre on the Vaal River.
1947	Iscor starts trading.
1947 to 1952	Vanderbijlpark Works develops into a full-fledged integrated steelworks processing iron ore and other raw materials from mines throughout Southern Africa into hot-rolled, cold-rolled, galvanised and tinned sheets and coils.
1952	4 October – Vanderbijlpark Works officially opened by His Excellency the Governor General, Dr E.G. Jansen.
1969	May – the South African Government and Iscor decide to build a third integrated works at Newcastle.
1974	17 March – first steel was made at Newcastle Works.
1980s	South African government commits itself to transferring certain state interests to the private sector.
1982	Iscor closes two oldest blast furnaces at Pretoria Works.
1989	Iscor privatised.
1989	November – Iscor Ltd. shares listed in the Steel and Allied sector of the Johannesburg Stock Exchange.
1991	Iscor buys USCO's steel division in mid-1991.
1995	Iscor, together with the Industrial Development Corp. (IDC), decides to pursue the Saldanha Steel project in the Western Cape.
1998	Saldanha Steel commissioned
2001	Iscor unbundled to form the steel group, – called Iscor, and a mining company called Kumba Resources.
2001	22 November – Iscor enters into a three-year business assistance agreement (BAA) with Anglo-Dutch steel producer LNM Holdings N.V.
2002	15 January – Iscor Ltd. shareholders approve the business assistance agreement with LNM.
2003	12 February – Minority shareholders in Iscor Ltd give LNM the go-ahead to proceed with a R1.8-billion partial offer.
2004	17 August – LNM acquires controlling stake in Iscor. Iscor Ltd. renamed Ispat Iscor Ltd. and registered with the Registrar of Companies.
2004	December – Ispat International NV acquires LNM Holdings NV, the parent company of Ispat Iscor. Merged company's rename Mittal Steel Company NV. Mittal Steel merger with International Steel Group of the US, to create the world's largest steel-maker.
2005	14 March – Ispat commences trading under the name Mittal Steel Ltd.
2013	ESM (Electric Steel Making) department at the Vanderbijlpark Works had to stop all 3 their Arc Furnace's and closed down the whole plant which included 3 Arc Furnace's, 2 Ladle Furnace's, 1 Vacuum Arc Degassing Plant and the V3 Continueous Caster. Due to their polluting licence expired, and poor management which made wrong decisions not to upgrade the old fume extraction plant but instead spent 16 million on unnecessary upgrades to the furnaces. These upgrades never worked and caused even more pollution, so the Electric Steel Making Department had to close their doors.
2025	6 January – Closure of steel-making operations in Newcastle and Vereeniging announced.

=== Race relations ===
The company was created by an act of the Parliament of South Africa to accomplish two things: to manufacture cheap steel (to help encourage industrialization) and to create employment. The company did a reasonably good job of the first task, although it became less efficient in the 1970s as it responded less to market pressures than to the political directives of the government of the day. Approximately half of the workforce was black, and were prevented from carrying out skilled or well-paid labour. White workers were provided with subsidized housing, extensive job training, and opportunities for occupational advancement. Black labourers were given free basic accommodation in hostels so that they could be close to their workplace; however these were extremely cramped, dirty and sometimes crime-ridden. The hostels were not open to families and only males were allowed. This became a political issue during the struggle for a democratic South Africa.

After a series of strikes in the 1930s and 1940s, the company provided white workers with cheap housing, generous pensions and health insurance. After forty years of work, skilled workers were eligible for a 100% pension, including annual adjustments for inflation. Black workers were not eligible for pensions until the 1980s. Blacks never received inflation-adjusted pensions as the company eliminated the pension scheme after it was privatized of the company in 1989.
