= South African Institute of Electrical Engineers =

Professional association in South Africa

- Founded: 1909
- Type: Professional Organization
- Purpose: Electrical engineering
- Location: SAIEE House, Observatory, Johannesburg, South Africa
- Region served: Southern Africa
- Method: Seminars, Publications, Education, Standards, Professional Development
- Members: 6000
- Key people: Mr Prince Moyo (President)
- Website: www.saiee.org.za

The South African Institute of Electrical Engineers (SAIEE) is a professional association representing electrical and electronic engineers, technologists and technicians in Southern Africa. The organisation is listed as a recognised Voluntary Association by the Engineering Council of South Africa (ECSA), the statutory body that registers professional engineers, professional certificated engineers, professional engineering technologists and professional engineering technicians in South Africa. Over a century, the activities of the SAIEE have included publication, education, the promotion of electrical engineering, professional development of its members, public events, and participation in public debate affecting the profession, industry and society.

== Sections ==
The SAIEE has sections that cover the following aspects of electrical engineering:

- Power and Energy
- Electronics and Software
- Historical
- Rotating Machines
- Telecommunications
- Lightning
- Systems Engineering

== Education ==
The SAIEE administers a number of university bursaries and scholarships in the field of electrical and electronic engineering in South Africa. Through its marketing and outreach activities, the organisation promotes engineering, and encourages young people to enter the profession. The SAIEE also provides accreditation for courses for Continuing Professional Development (CPD) points, as required by ECSA for renewal of professional registration.

== Seminars and lectures ==
The SAIEE runs regular seminars, lectures and other events for its members and the public. Notable annual events include the Bernard Price Memorial Lecture, arranged jointly with the University of the Witwatersrand since 1951, and the President's Invitation Lecture.

- SAUPEC

== Publications ==
- SAIEE Africa Research Journal (ARJ), a peer-reviewed journal, which changed name from Transactions of the SAIEE in 2005
- wattnow, a magazine for members

== Presidents ==
- Pascal Motsoasele, 2024
- Prince Moyo, 2022
- Prof. Sunil Maharaj, 2021
- (Ms) Sy Gourrah, 2020
- George Debbo, 2019
- Dr Hendri Geldenhuys, 2018
- Jacob Machinjike, 2017
- TC Madikane, 2016
- Andre Hoffmann, 2015
- Dr Pat Naidoo, 2014
- Paul van Niekerk, 2013
- Mike Cary, 2012
- Andries Tshabalala, 2011
- Dr Angus Hay, 2010
- du Toit Grobler, 2009 Centenary Year
- VM Wilson, 2008
- IS Mckechnie, 2007
- VJ Crone, 2006
- (Ms)BM Lacquet, 2005
- BNB Ngulube, 2004
- PC Ballot, 2003
- RG Coney, 2002
- JW Gosling, 2001
- RH Hayes, 2000
- AME Schulze, 1999
- SC Bridgens, 1998
- KC Plowden, 1997
- RA Harker, 1996
- (Ms)MT Davison, 1995
- WS Calder, 1994
- MA Crouch, 1993
- DH Jacobson, 1992
- EJ Davison, 1991
- RA Leigh, 1990
- Walter Henry Milton, 1947
- Thomas P Stratten, 1940-
