= George Howe =

George Howe may refer to:

- Sir George Howe, 1st Baronet (c. 1627–1676), English politician
- George Howe (physician) (1654/5–1710), Scottish physician
- George Howe, 3rd Viscount Howe (1725–1758), British Army general
- George Howe (printer) (1769–1821), Australian printer, editor and poet
- George Howe (politician) (active 1835–1837), American politician in the Michigan House of Representatives
- George Howe (merchant) (1819–1899), American merchant and industrialist
- George Howe (attorney) (1824–1888), American lawyer
- George A. Howe (died 1909), Massachusetts politician
- George Frederick Howe (1856–1937), British civil servant
- George William Osborn Howe (1875–1960), British electrical engineer
- George Howe (architect) (1886–1955), American architect
- George L. Howe (1898–1977), author and intelligence operative in World War II
- George Howe (actor) (1900–1986), English actor and comedian
- George Howe (footballer) (1924–1971), English footballer
- George Howe (priest) (born 1952), Anglican priest
- George W. Howe (active since 1992), American psychologist

== See also ==
- George Curzon-Howe, 2nd Earl Howe (1821–1876), British peer
- George Fenton (born George Richard Ian Howe, 1949–2026), English composer
