= Máire O'Neill =

Northern Irish academic (engineering, information security)

Máire O'Neill FREng, MRIA
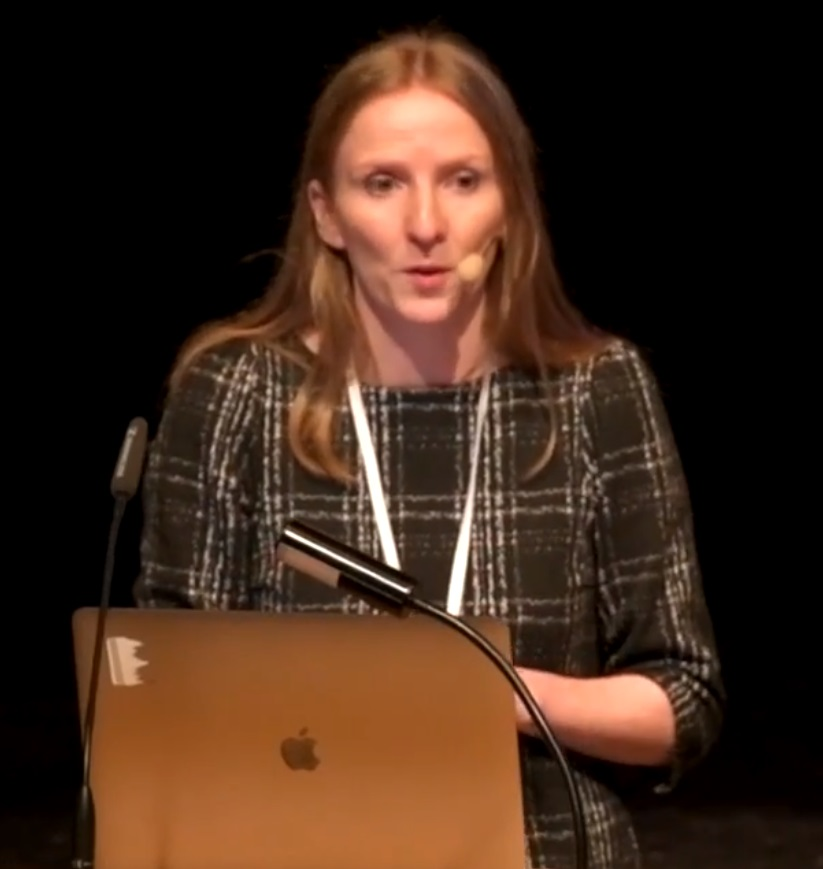
- O'Neill speaks at the Real World Crypto conference in 2018
- Born: Máire Patricia McLoone; Glenties
- Education: Queen's University Belfast
- Known for: Encryption; Data security
- Awards: Royal Academy of Engineering Silver Medal; Blavatnik Awards for Young Scientists
- Scientific career
- Workplaces: Queen's University Belfast
- Doctoral advisor: John McCanny

Máire Patricia O'Neill (née McLoone; born 1978) is an Irish Professor of Information Security and inventor based at the Centre for Secure Information Technologies Queen's University Belfast. She was named the 2007 British Female Inventors & Innovators Network Female Inventor of the Year. She was the youngest person to be made a professor of engineering at Queen's University Belfast and youngest person to be inducted into the Irish Academy of Engineering.

== Early life and education ==
O'Neill is from Glenties. Her father, John McLoone, built a hydroelectric scheme on the Oweneda river, which was close to O'Neill's house, providing the family with free electricity. He was a vice-principal and maths teacher at Glenties Comprehensive School. She has lived in Belfast since she was a teenager. At Strathearn School she studied mathematics, physics and technology.

She studied electronic engineering at Queen's University Belfast, and was sponsored by a local company to work on data security. She decided to stay on for a PhD in the architectures of data encryption. She was a PhD student working under the supervision of John McCanny at Queen's University Belfast.

During her PhD she worked at a university spin-out company, Amphion Semiconductor, where she designed electronic circuits. Her first interaction with entrepreneurship was during her doctoral training, when her PhD project on high speed Advanced Encryption Standard (AES) was successfully commercialised by an American semiconductor company for use in set-top boxes. The AES circuit design developed by O'Neill improved hardware efficiency six-fold.

She earned her PhD in 2002, and was awarded a Royal Academy of Engineering Research Fellowship in 2003. With John McCanny, O'Neill wrote a book about system on a chip architectures for private-key data encryption.

== Research and career ==
In 2004, O'Neill was made a lecturer in Electronics, Communications and Information Technology at Queen's University Belfast. She worked on security systems to protect users from cyber threats, and was made Head of the Cryptography Research Team. She works on improving hardware security. She has also worked with Electronics and Telecommunications Research Institute on a new type of security system to protect electric vehicle charging systems, which was licensed by LG CNS. O’Neill was awarded an Engineering and Physical Sciences Research Council Leadership Grant to develop research into next generation data security and has since been awarded a Horizon 2020 grant. Her research has considered the data security requirements that are associated with emerging applications of mobile computing. She worked on quantum dot cellular automata circuit design techniques, which are being considered as alternates to CMOS and have lower power dissipation. She also developed PicoPUF, a physical unclonable function (PUF) device that contained a semiconductor IP core to provide authentication for microchips, which was awarded the INVENT2015 prize. In 2013 O'Neill wrote the academic text book Design of Semiconductor QCA Systems, which was published by Artech House.

There is a region of China that produces 95% of the world's cultured freshwater pearls. Differentiating a real from a fake pearl can be challenging, and increasing numbers of counterfeit pearls are bankrupting Chinese pearl farmers. O'Neill devised an approach to determine whether or not a pearl is real using Radio-Frequency IDentification tags. These RFID tags could be embedded into each pearl that the farmer's collect, guaranteeing their authenticity. They could encode other information about the pearl onto the RFID tag, which could be collected by a simple scanner. Equivalent to the damages caused by fake pearls; hacked and cloned devices acting on a network can be dangerous. O'Neill is also investigating ways to secure connected devices, the so-called internet of things. In 2017 she was made Director of the United Kingdom Research Institute in Secure Hardware and Embedded Systems, a £5 million centre in Belfast.

O'Neill is currently investigating post-quantum cryptography algorithms.

=== Academic service ===
At the age of 32 O'Neill was the youngest person ever to be appointed a professor of engineering at Queen's University Belfast. In 2018 O'Neill was named the Principal Investigator of the Centre for Secure Information Technologies (CSIT) in the Northern Ireland Science Park. She delivered a TED talk on the future of internet of things security at Queen's University Belfast in 2019. She has appeared on BBC World Service. She was elected to join the UK Artificial Intelligence council in May 2019.

In August 2019 O'Neill was appointed acting director of ECIT, the Institute of Electronics, Communications and Information Technology at Queen's University Belfast.

O'Neill has worked on improving gender balance in engineering throughout her career. She was the 2006 Belfast Telegraph schools lecturer, sharing her work on data encryption with hundreds of school children. O'Neill led the successful Queen's University Belfast silver Athena SWAN application. She has described Wendy Hall as one of her role models.

=== Awards and honours ===
Her awards and honours include;

- 2003 Royal Academy of Engineering Research Fellowship
- 2004 Vodafone Award at Britain's Younger Engineers Event
- 2006 Women's Engineering Society prize at the IET Young Woman Engineer of the Year
- 2007 British Female Inventors & Innovators Network Female Inventor of the Year
- 2007 European Union Women Inventors & Innovators Innovator of the Year
- 2015 Fellow of the Irish Academy of Engineering
- 2014 Royal Academy of Engineering Silver Medal
- 2015 INVENT 2015
- 2017 Elected to Royal Irish Academy
- 2019 Blavatnik Awards for Young Scientists
- 2019 Fellow of the Royal Academy of Engineering
- 2020 Regius Professorship

== Personal life ==
O'Neill is married to an electronic engineer, and they have three children. Her two brothers are both electronic engineers and her two sisters are medical doctors.
