= ECIT =

Cyber crime institutes in the United Kingdom

Coordinates: 54°36′50″N 5°54′00″W

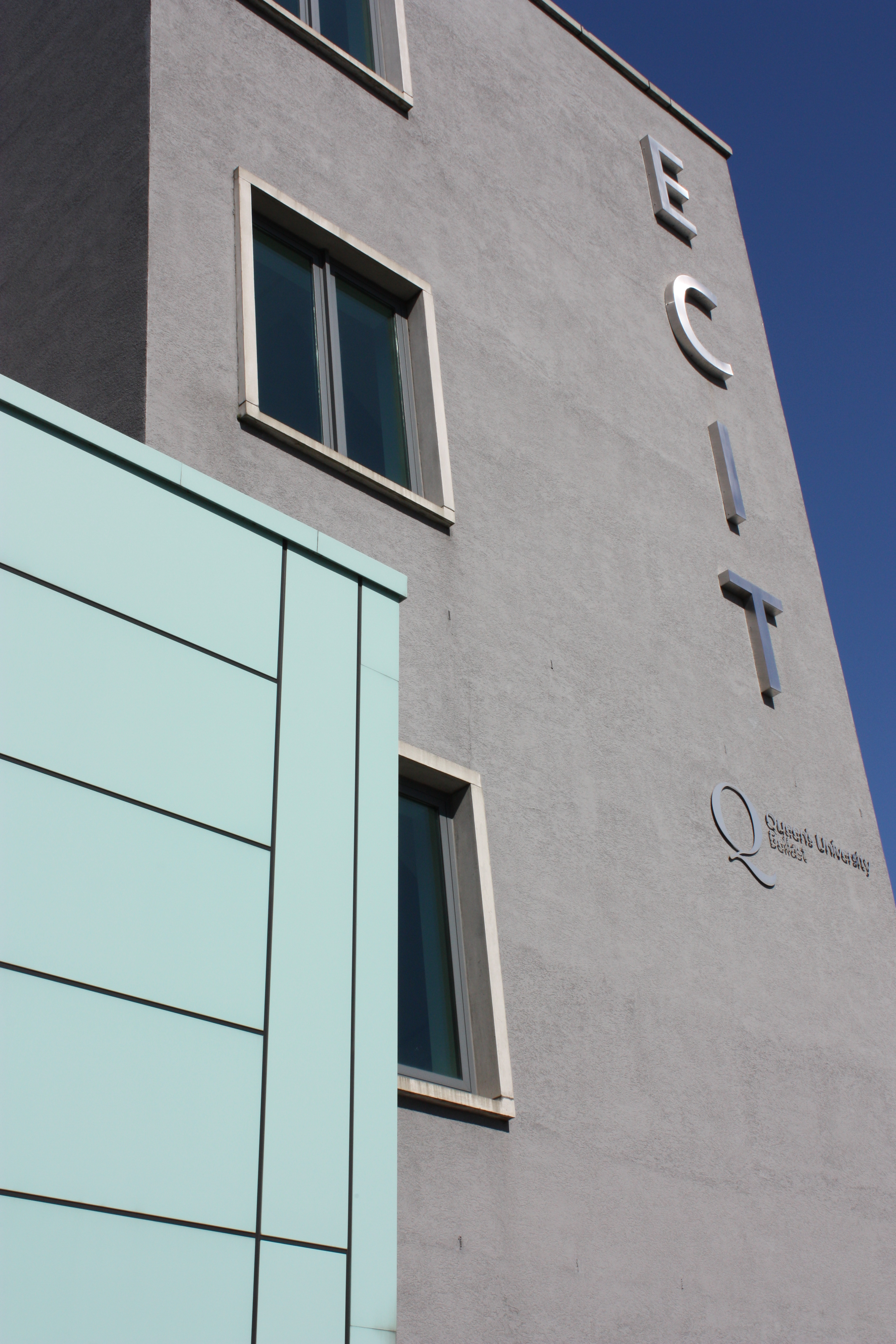
ECIT building

ECIT (The Institute of Electronics, Communications and Information Technology) was established in 2003 at the School of Electronics, Electrical Engineering and Computer Science at Queen's University Belfast (QUB) under the leadership of Professor Sir John V. McCanny CBE FRS FREng MRIA. Professor Máire O'Neill (FIAE, MRIA) was appointed Acting Director in August 2019.

Its three research centres cover areas such as cyber security, wireless, data science and scalable computing.

The institute is home to The Centre for Secure Information Technologies (CSIT). It also houses the Centre for Wireless Innovation (CWI) and the Centre for Data Science and Scalable Computing (DSSC).

CSIT is an Innovation and Knowledge Centre (IKC) and was established in 2009 with over £30M initial funding. It is the UK's largest university cyber security research lab, and is acknowledged by the UK NCSC as an Academic Centre of Excellence.

Centre for Wireless Innovation (CWI) was ranked 28th globally in the ShanghaiRanking's Global Ranking of Academic Subjects in Telecommunication Engineering having ascended 35 places on the 2018 ranking. This placed CWI at 5th in Europe and 2nd in UK in Telecommunication Engineering for 2019.

ECIT is located at Catalyst Inc, Belfast. The Titanic Dock is nearly 50 meters away from the ECIT main entrance.

In 2024, QUB won funding to extend the ECIT building by an extra five storeys.

In 2025, ECIT and Momentum One Zero are part of the Belfast Regional City Deal.

In its first 15 years, ECIT created 2300 jobs.
