= Semenza =

Semenza is a surname. Notable people with the surname include:

- Giovanni Giacomo Semenza (1580–1638), Italian painter
- Gregg L. Semenza (born 1956), American oncologist and Nobel laureate
- Guido Semenza (1868–1929), Italian electrical engineer, inventor, and scholar
