= LMS Center =

Coordinates: 50°12′35.69″N 15°49′35.17″E

LMS Center (Language-Mind-Society Center) (Czech: LMS Centrum) is a centre for the study of language, mind and society established at the Faculty of Arts of the University of Hradec Králové, Czech Republic, EU in 2009 with support from the ESF. The centre’s goal is support of interdisciplinary research connecting philosophy with neighbouring sciences whose results are relevant to uncovering the nature and principles of the mind, language and society.

== Faculty ==
Headmaster: Mgr. Ondřej Švec, Ph.D. (FF UHK & FLÚ AV ČR)

Scientific board: Vojtěch Kolman, PhD. (FF UHK & FF UK) Jan Kremláček, PhD. (LF UK HK) Martin Paleček, PhD. (FF UHK) Prof. Jaroslav Peregrin (FF UHK & FLÚ AV ČR) Prof. Björn Ramberg (University of Oslo) Prof. Josef Zelenka(FIM UHK)
