= Bashir Al-Hashimi =

Computer engineer (born 1961)

Professor Sir Bashir Al-Hashimi CBE FRS FREng FIET FBCS FIEEE
- Al-Hashimi in Sept 2026
- Born: 5 January 1961 (age 65); Baghdad, Iraq
- Awards: IET Faraday Medal
- Scientific career
- Fields: Computer engineering, energy efficient computing, embedded systems, low power semiconductor chips test
- Workplaces: King's College London, University of Southampton
- Website: www.kcl.ac.uk/people/professor-bashir-al-hashimi

Sir Bashir Mohammed Ali Al-Hashimi (Arabic: بشير محمد علي الهاشمي; born 5 January 1961) is an Iraqi-British computer engineering researcher, academic and higher education leader. He is Senior Vice President (Research & Special Initiatives) and ARM Professor of Computer Engineering at King's College London in the United Kingdom. He was the co-founder and co-director of the ARM-ECS Research Centre, an industry-university collaboration partnership involving the University of Southampton and ARM. He is the chair of the Engineers 2030 working group, a national campaign overseen by the National Engineering Policy Centre and led by the UK Royal Academy of Engineering. He is Vice-President for International and chair of the Royal Academy of Engineering's International Committee.

== Research and academic career ==
Bashir has made contributions to the field of hardware-software co-design, low power semiconductor chips test and test-data compression of digital integrated circuits and energy-harvesting computing.

In 2009, he established the Pervasive Systems Centre. He has published 6 books and numerous peer-reviewed papers.

He was the project director for PRiME, an EPSRC funded five-year programme (2013–2018).

He was also the project director for the EPSRC funded Holistic battery-free electronics project, aiming to develop ultra-energy-efficient electronic systems for emerging applications including mobile digital health and autonomous wireless monitoring in environmental and industrial settings.

In 2014, he was appointed Executive Dean of the Faculty of Physical Sciences and Engineering at Southampton and in 2018, as Executive Dean of the Faculty of Engineering and Physical Sciences. In 2020, he joined King's College London to lead the Faculty of Natural and Mathematical Sciences.

In May 2025, he was appointed co-director of the King's Institute for Artificial Intelligence.

=== Awards, honours and fellowships ===
- In 2025, Bashir Al-Hashimi won the IEEE-HKN Asad M. Madni Outstanding Technical Achievement and Excellence Award.
- In 2025, Al-Hashimi won the Fazlur Rahman Khan Award for Excellence in Engineering, Science or Technology - Muslim News Awards
- In 2025, Al-Hashimi was elected to the membership of the Academia Europea.
- Bashir Al-Hashimi was knighted in the 2025 New Year Honours for services to engineering and education
- In 2023, he was elected as a Fellow of the Royal Society (FRS).
- Elected in 2023 as a member of the European Academy of Sciences and Arts.
- In 2020, he was awarded the IET Faraday Medal.
- Bashir was also appointed a Commander of the Order of the British Empire (CBE) in the 2018 Queen's Birthday Honours for services to computer engineering and to industry.
- In 2014, he received the Royal Society Wolfson Fellowship for his work on energy-efficient and reliable many-core computing systems.
- Elected a Fellow of the Royal Academy of Engineering (FREng) in 2013.
- In 2012, the European Electronic Design Automation Association awarded him a DATE Fellowship for leadership and outstanding contributions to electronic design, automation and test.
- In 2012, he was awarded the Outstanding Service Award by the IEEE Council for Electronic Design Automation (CEDA) for serving as the General Chair of DATE 2012.
- Elected a Fellow of the Institute of Electrical and Electronics Engineers (FIEEE) in 2009.
- Appointed a Fellow of the British Computer Society (FBCS) in 2007.
- Fellow of the Institute of Engineering and Technology (FIET) in 2003.

=== Appointments ===
Bashir was an Elected Trustee of the Royal Academy of Engineering Board for a 3-year term to September 2024 and completed in 2023 a term as chair of the academy's Awards Committee. He is a Board Director of the ERA Foundation and was a UK Electronics Skills Foundation (UKESF) Board Trustee and Director.

He was a member of the Research England Expanding Excellence in England (E3) Fund Assessment Panel.

He was a Trustee of King's College London Mathematics School, completing his term in 2023.
