= Ramsay Shearman =

British shortwave radio and RADAR engineer (1924-2019)

Professor Ramsay Shearman FREng FIET FRMetS FIEEE
- Ramsay Shearman, Hillhead radio station, 1951
- Born: 17 November 1924; Cambridge, England
- Died: 13 December 2019 (aged 95)
- Education: Imperial College London
- Scientific career
- Fields: Electronic engineer
- Workplaces: University of Birmingham; Admiralty Signals and Radar Establishment; RAF; NASA

Edwin Douglas Ramsay Shearman (17 November 1924 - 13 December 2019) was a shortwave radio and radar pioneer, whose discoveries aided fishing, shipping, and search and rescue. In 1986 he was awarded the IET Faraday Medal.

== Early life ==
Edwin Douglas Ramsay Shearman was born on 17 November 1924 in Cambridge, the son of Sir Harold Shearman, a socialist educationalist, and Lady Shearman, a teacher from County Durham. Shearman's parents adopted Reggie Khosla whose father had been the judge on the trial of Vinayak Godse, the assassin of Mahatma Gandhi.

Shearman was educated at Bedford Modern School and King's College School, before going up to Imperial College London where he rowed and graduated with a first class degree in Electrical Engineering.

== Career ==
In 1946, Shearman began his career with the Admiralty Signal Establishment with a focus on high frequency communications following which he worked alongside Sir Robert Watson-Watt and Arnold Wilkins, considered to be the first radar pioneers in the UK. His early discoveries in short-wave radio (high-frequency radio waves) were able to accurately assess sea conditions. In 1957, Shearman tracked the satellite Sputnik 1 and was able to greatly assist in the understanding of the ionosphere. He subsequently worked with the Royal Air Force and US Air Force before joining NASA for two years to help design the Alouette satellite which made further important advances in the understanding of the upper half of the ionosphere. After NASA, Shearman worked for the Ministry of Defence.

In 1962, Shearman made a complete change to his career and became Senior Lecturer in Electromagnetism at the University of Birmingham and engaged in setting up the Radio Research Group there. At Birmingham, Shearman built up his own research program on a Moon-bounce project, and a number of professors and leaders in industry and government research stemmed from the programme. Shearman continued to advise the Ministry of Defence and GCHQ.

Shearman was awarded the Institution of Electrical Engineers (now IET) Faraday Medal in 1986 and was made an Institute of Electrical and Electronics Engineers (IEEE) Fellow in 1982.

== Family life ==
In 1955, Shearman married Rosalind Morris, a chiropodist, voluntary social worker, and Liberal Party activist with a passion for ballet. They had three daughters.
