= IET Faraday Medal =

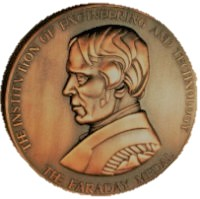
- Front side of the medal
- Awarded for: Awarded either for notable scientific or industrial achievement in engineering or for conspicuous service rendered to the advancement of science, engineering and technology or for lifetime achievement in science, engineering or technology.
- Sponsored by: Institution of Engineering and Technology (IET) and the Institution of Electrical Engineers (IEE)
- Date: 1922; 104 years ago
- Country: United Kingdom
- Website: Faraday Medal recipients
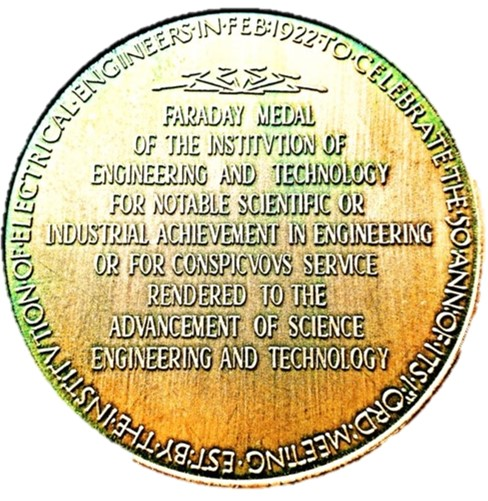
- Reverse side of the medal

Precedence
- Next (higher): None
- Next (lower): Mountbatten Medal

The Faraday Medal is a top-tier international medal awarded by the UK Institution of Engineering and Technology (IET) (previously known as the Institution of Electrical Engineers (IEE)). As one of the world's foremost awards in engineering and the most prestigious in electrical engineering, it is part of the IET Achievement Medals collection of awards. The medal is named after the British physicist Michael Faraday, the father of electromagnetism.

== Background ==
The Faraday Medal is the IET's highest honour and one of the world's most prestigious awards for engineers and scientists. Winners include ground-breaking pioneers and inventors. First awarded in 1922, it is one of the oldest medals still being awarded today. The top medal is awarded annually to distinguished individuals who either for notable scientific or industrial achievement in engineering or for conspicuous service rendered to the advancement of science, engineering and technology, without restriction as regards nationality, country of residence or membership of the Institution. The award was established in 1922 to commemorate the 50th Anniversary of the first Ordinary Meeting of the Society of Telegraph Engineers and is named after Michael Faraday. Each year, the recipient received his/her award at a ceremony held in London that is hosted by the IET.

== Winners ==
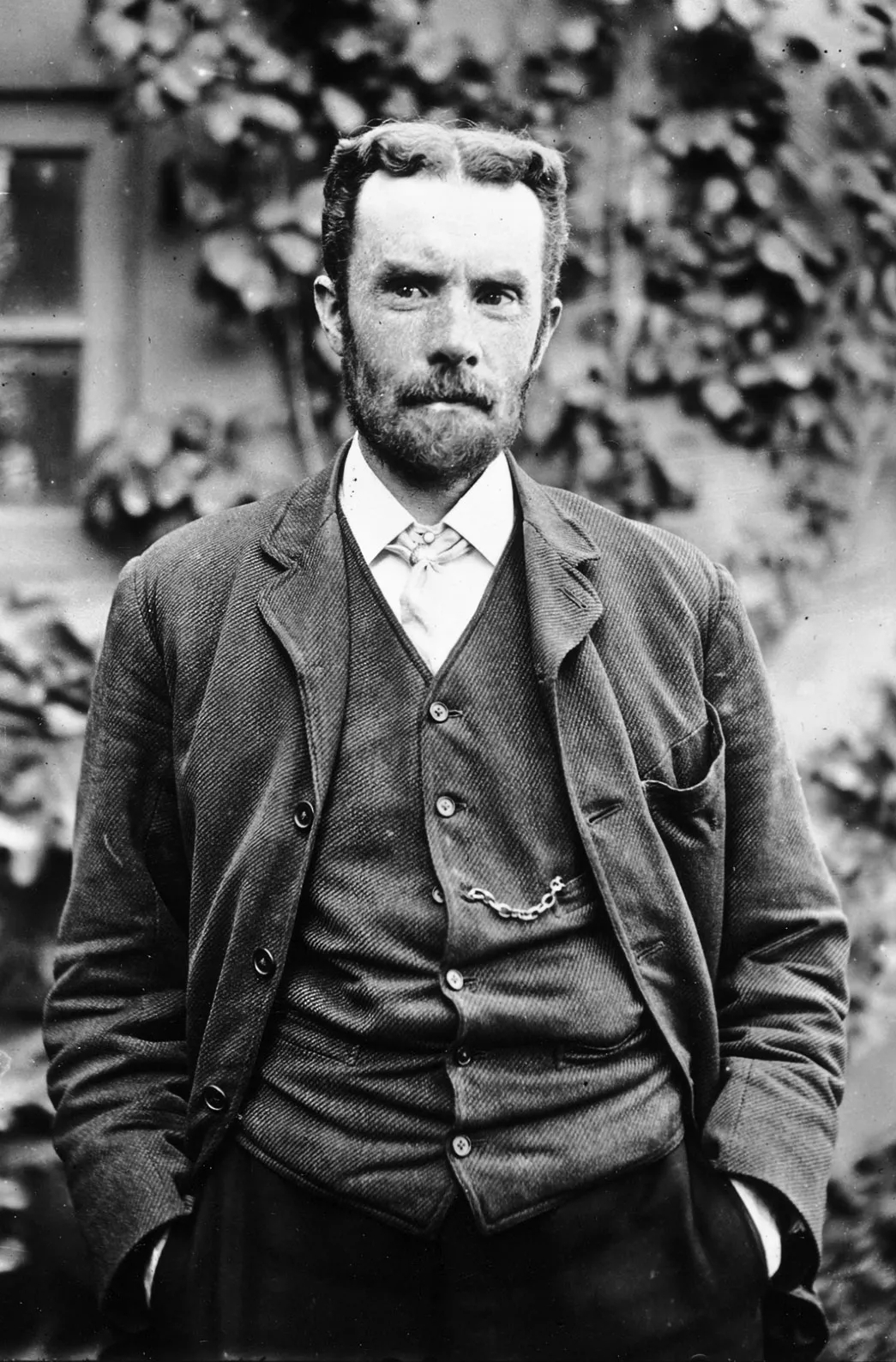
Heaviside: Transmission line theory, H-step function, 1922

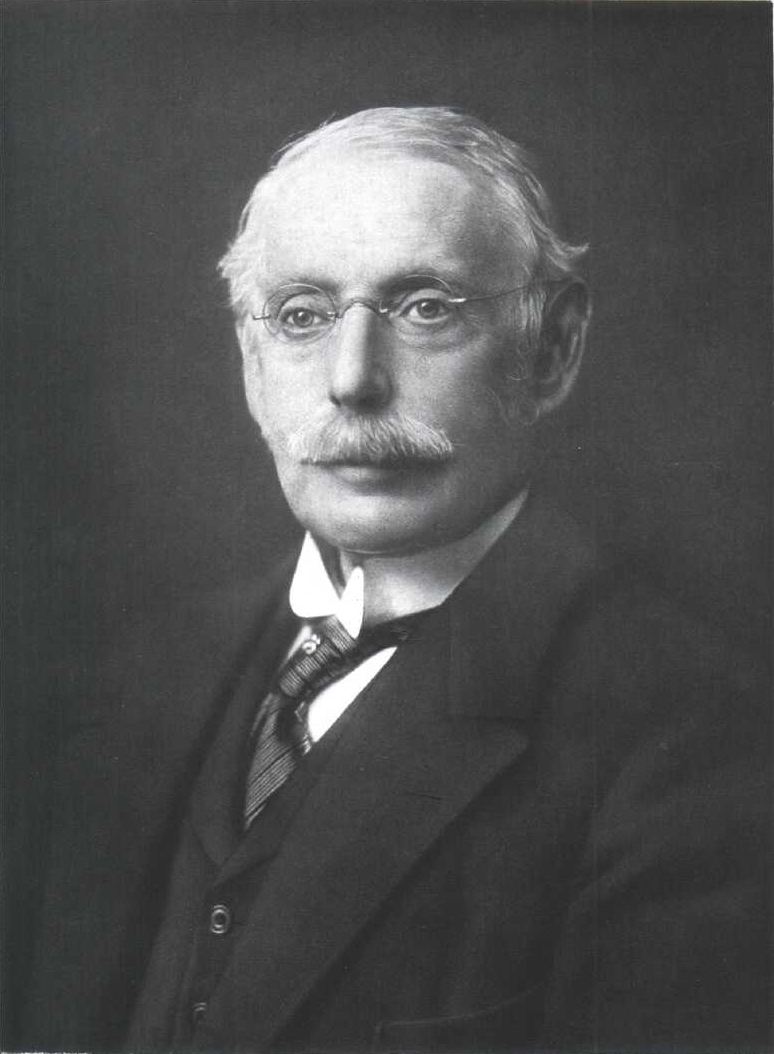
Parsons: Invented the modern steam turbine, 1923

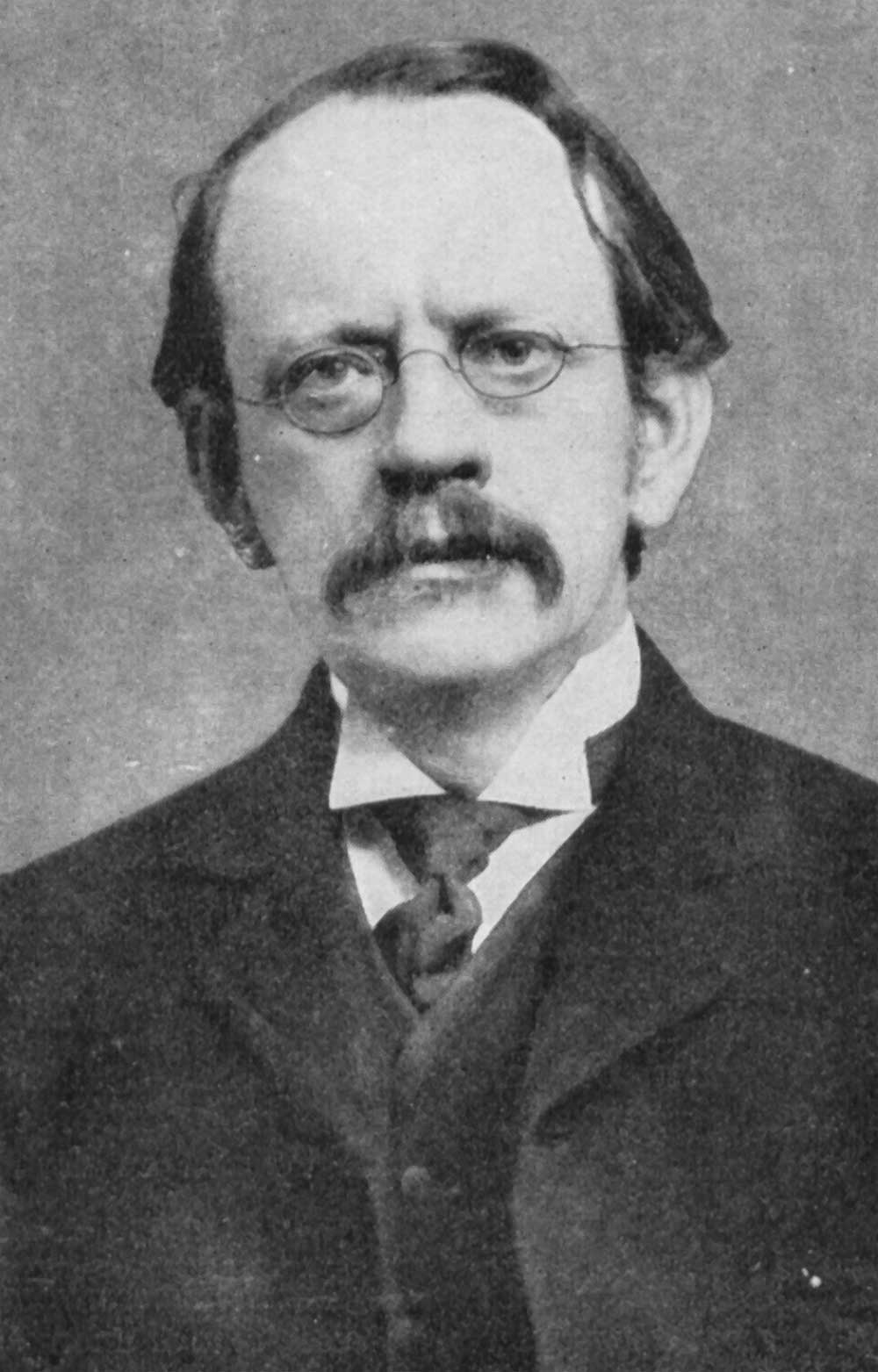
Thomson: Discovered electrons, 1925

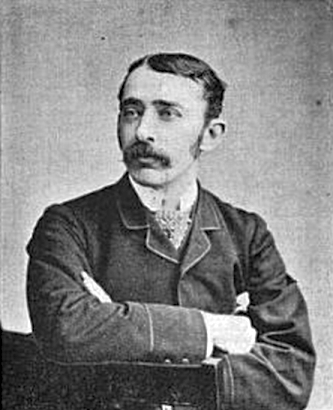
Fleming: Invented vacuum tubes, 1928

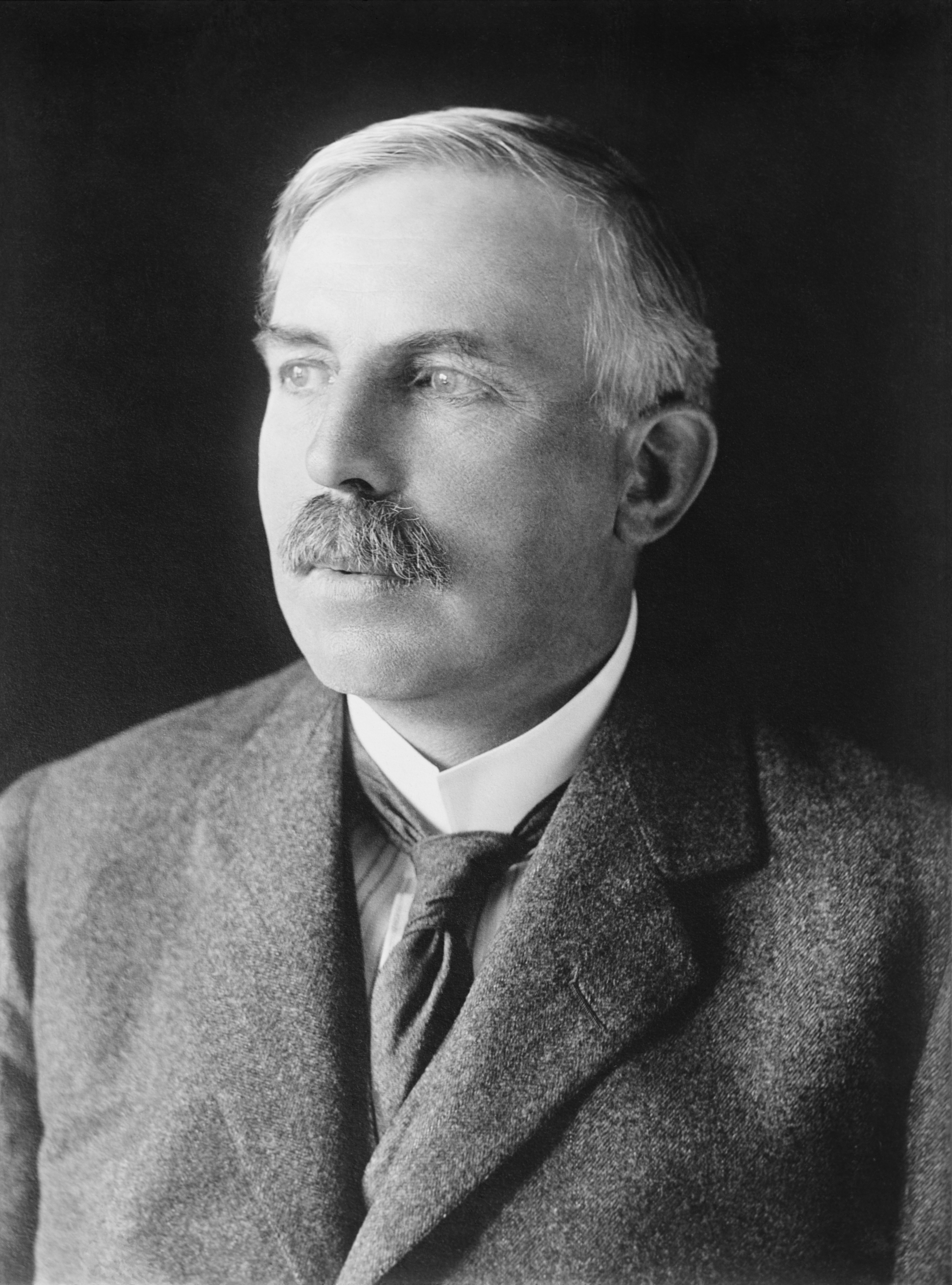
Rutherford: Discovered the atomic nucleus, 1930

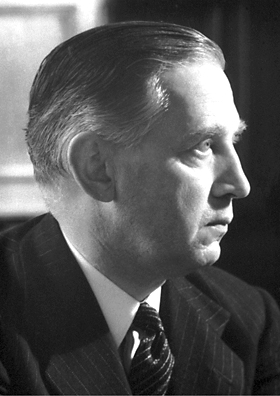
Appleton: Discovered the Appleton layer, 1946

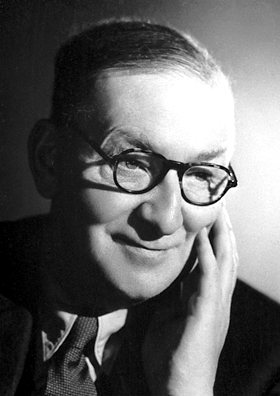
Cockcroft: "Split" the atomic nucleus, 1955

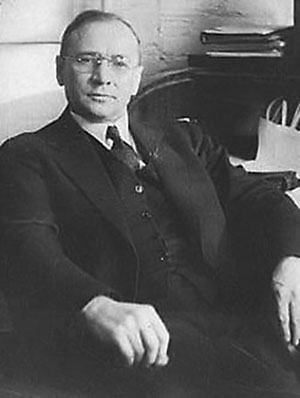
Zworykin involved with inventing television and electron microscope, 1965

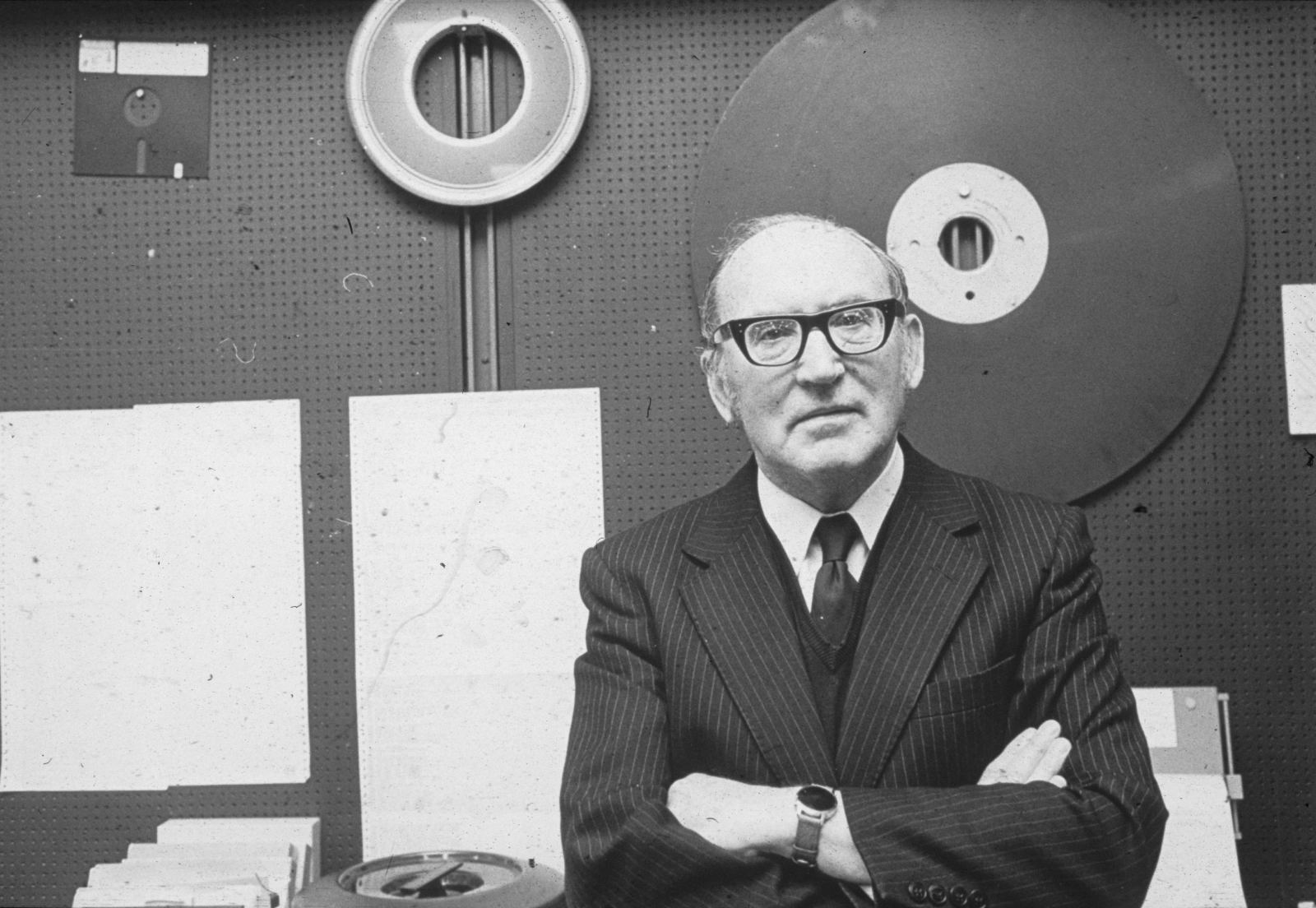
Wilkes: Built the first electronic computer, 1981

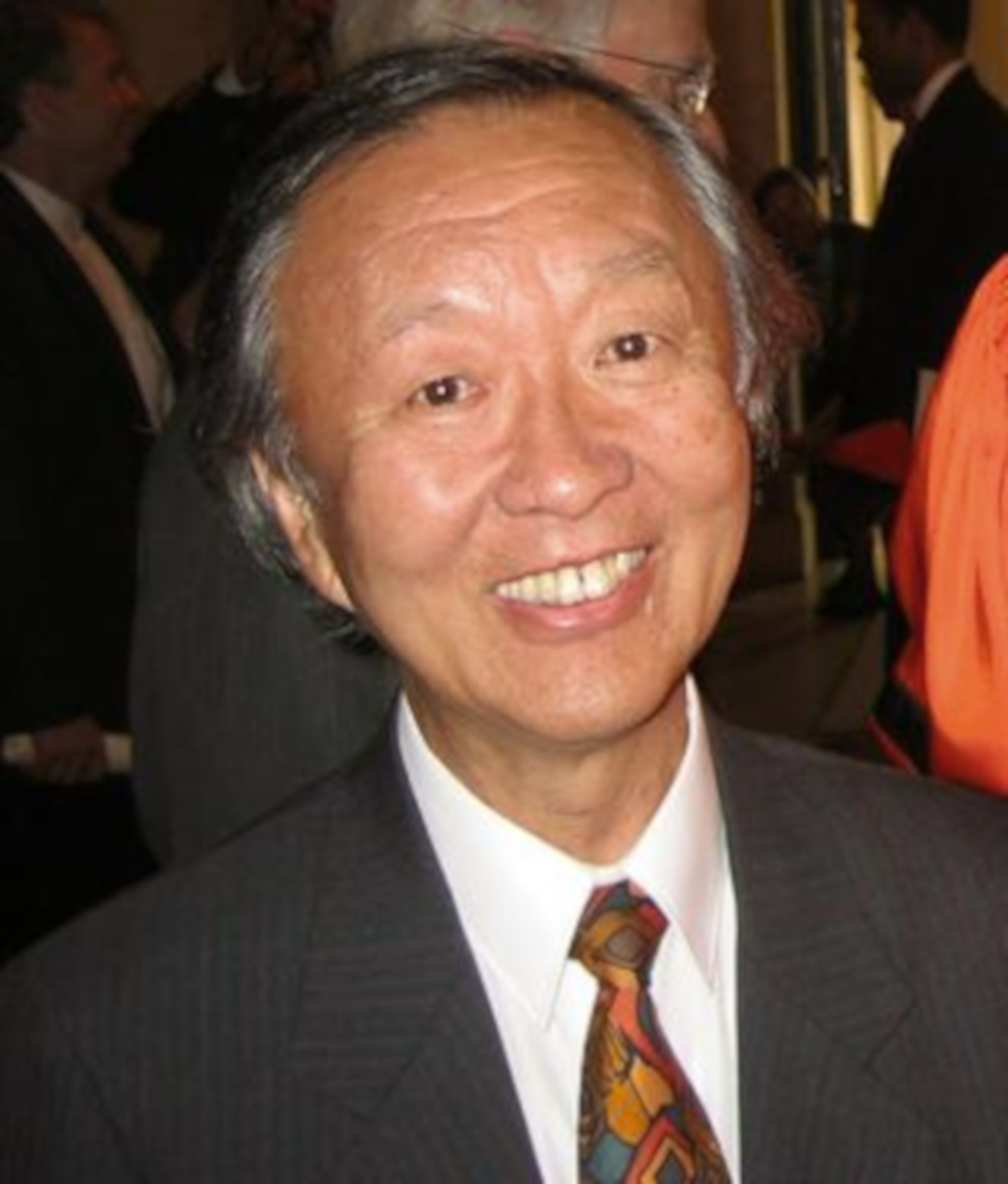
Kao: Pioneered the development and use of fibre optics, 1989

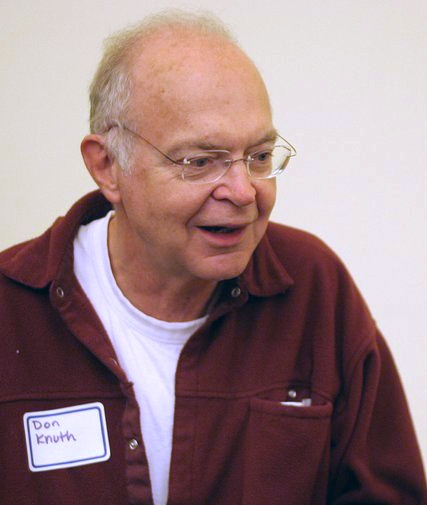
Knuth: Art of computer programming, 2011

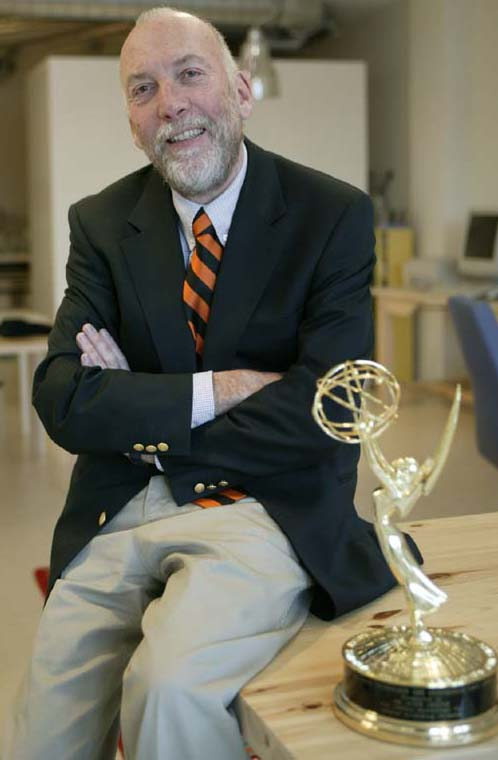
Immink: Digital video and audio recording, 2015

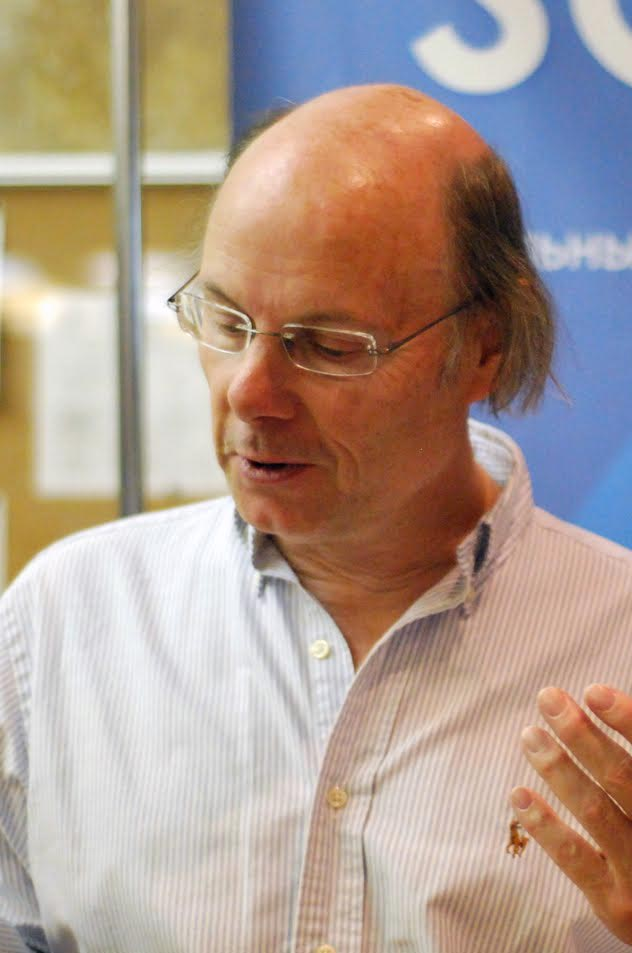
Stroustrup: Created C++, 2017

=== First 50 Years (1922–1972) ===
- 1922 Oliver Heaviside
- 1923 The Hon Sir Charles Algernon Parsons
- 1924 Sebastian Ziani de Ferranti
- 1925 Sir Joseph John Thomson
- 1926 Rookes Evelyn Bell Crompton
- 1927 Elihu Thomson
- 1928 Sir Ambrose Fleming
- 1929 Guido Semenza
- 1930 Sir Ernest Rutherford
- 1931 Charles Hesterman Merz
- 1932 Sir Oliver Lodge
- 1933 no award
- 1934 Sir Frank Edward Smith
- 1935 Frank Baldwin Jewett
- 1936 Sir William Henry Bragg
- 1937 André Blondel
- 1938 Sir John Francis Cleverton Snell
- 1939 William David Coolidge
- 1940 Alexander Russell
- 1941 Sir Arthur Percy Morris Fleming
- 1942 Pyotr Kapitsa
- 1943 Sir Archibald Page
- 1944 Irving Langmuir
- 1945 Sir Clifford Copland Paterson
- 1946 Sir Edward Victor Appleton
- 1947 Sir Leonard Pearce
- 1948 Mark Oliphant
- 1949 Charles Samuel Franklin
- 1950 Sir James Chadwick
- 1951 Thomas Eckersley
- 1952 Ernest Lawrence
- 1953 Sir Arthur Stanley Angwin
- 1954 Sir Isaac Shoenberg
- 1955 Sir John Cockcroft
- 1956 G W O Howe
- 1957 Waldemar Borgquist
- 1958 Sir Gordon Radley
- 1959 Luigi Emanueli
- 1960 Sir George Paget Thomson
- 1961 Julius Adams Stratton
- 1962 Sir Basil Schonland
- 1963 Pierre Marie Jean Ailleret
- 1964 Joseph Ronald Mortlock
- 1965 Vladimir Zworykin
- 1966 J A Ratcliffe
- 1967 H E M Barlow
- 1968 Leslie Herbert Bedford
- 1969 Philip Sporn
- 1970 Charles William Oatley
- 1971 Sir Martin Ryle
- 1972 F C Williams

=== Next 50 Years (1973–2023) ===
- 1973 Sir Nevill Mott
- 1974 George Millington
- 1975 John Millar Meek
- 1976 Thomas Otten Paine
- 1977 John Bertram Adams
- 1978 Erich Friedlander
- 1979 Robert Noyce
- 1980 Eric Ash
- 1981 Sir Maurice Wilkes
- 1982 Brian David Josephson
- 1983 William Alexander Gambling
- 1984 Alexander Lamb Cullen
- 1985 Sir Charles Antony Richard Hoare
- 1986 Edwin Douglas Ramsay Shearman
- 1987 Sir David Evan Naunton Davies
- 1988 Cyril Hilsum
- 1989 Charles Kuen Kao
- 1990 Peter Lawrenson
- 1991 Alan Rudge
- 1992 Laszlo Solymar
- 1993 Alistair George James MacFarlane
- 1994 John Parnaby
- 1995 David Rhodes
- 1996 Stewart Crichton Miller
- 1997 John Edwin Midwinter
- 1998 Roger Needham
- 1999 Patrick Arthur McKeown
- 2000 J. Michael Brady
- 2001 Chris Harris
- 2002 Sir Robin Saxby
- 2003 Sir Richard Friend
- 2004 Peter Mitchell Grant
- 2005 Azim Premji
- 2006 John McCanny
- 2007 Steve Furber
- 2008 Josef Kittler
- 2009 Sir Martin Sweeting
- 2010 Donal Bradley
- 2011 Donald Knuth
- 2012 Leonardo Chiariglione
- 2013 Sir Michael Pepper
- 2014 Christofer Toumazou
- 2015 Kees Schouhamer Immink
- 2016 Andy Harter
- 2017 Bjarne Stroustrup
- 2018 - not awarded
- 2019 Sir Peter Knight
- 2020 Bashir Al-Hashimi
- 2021 John E E Fleming
- 2022 Chad Mirkin
- 2023 Arogyaswami Paulraj
- 2024 - not awarded
- 2025 Martin Green (professor)
- 2026 Nick Jennings

== See also ==
- Queen Elizabeth Prize for Engineering
- Millennium Technology Prize
- IEEE Medal of Honor
- Turing Award
- Nobel Prize
