= University of Hradec Králové =

Public university in Czechia

- Univerzita Hradec Králové
- Type: Public
- Established: 1964 as independent Faculty of Education, renamed on 21 June 2000
- Rector: Jan Kříž
- Students: 6,500
- Location: Hradec Králové, Czech Republic; 50°12′35.57″N 15°49′35.22″E
- Website: https://www.uhk.cz/en
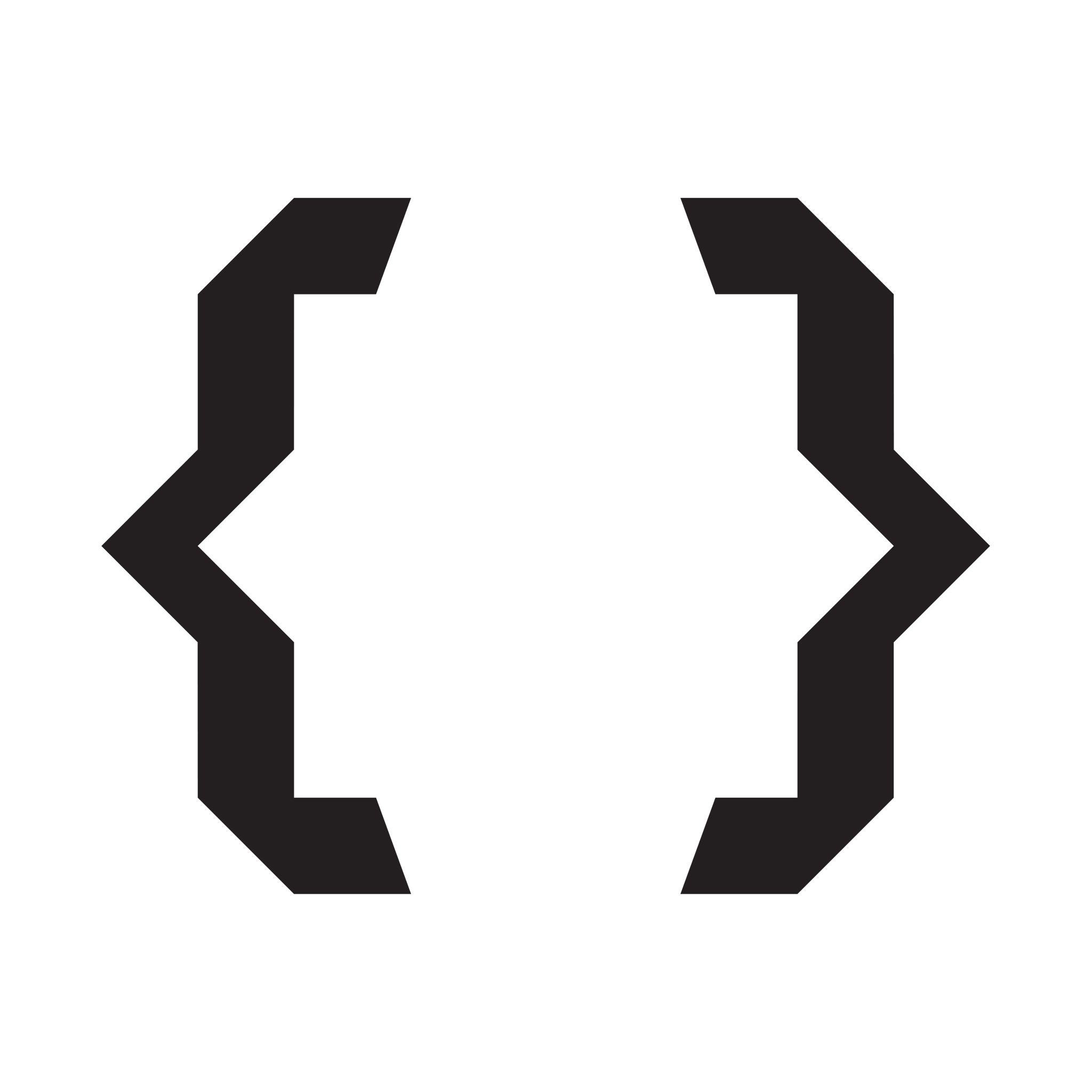

University rankings

Global – Overall
- QS World: 1001–1200

Regional – Overall
- QS Emerging Europe and Central Asia: 185 (2022)

The University of Hradec Králové (in Czech Univerzita Hradec Králové, UHK; in Latin Universitas Reginaegradecensis) is a public university and one of the most significant educational and research institutions in the East Bohemian region, located in Hradec Králové, Czech Republic, founded on 21 June 2000. It traces its roots back to 1959, which was renamed the University of Education in Hradec Králové (Vysoká škola pedagogická v Hradci Králové; VŠP) in 1992. The university has about 6,000 students, and the current rector is Jan Kříž, who assumed the position in 2024.

The university consists of four faculties: the Faculty of Education, the Faculty of Informatics and Management, the Philosophical Faculty, and the Faculty of Science.

The university's precursor institution, the Institute of Education in Hradec Králové, was established in 1959, to train teachers for elementary level education, until then educated in high schools. In 1964, the institution developed into the Faculty of Education Hradec Králové. Training for all education levels began after a higher education reform in Czechoslovakia in 1976.

After the Velvet Revolution in 1989, some former staff from before 1968 returned to the faculty. In 1992 the Pedagogical University of Hradec Králové was officially established. On 15 February 1993, the university started expanding and a new Faculty of Management and Information Technologies was added, subsequently renamed the Faculty of Informatics and Management in 2000, the same year as the University of Hradec Králové was adopted as the official name.

On 1 September 2005, university added a third faculty, the Faculty of Arts, later known as the Philosophical Faculty. On 1 September 2010, after the transformation of the Faculty of Education, the Faculty of Science was formed.

== History ==
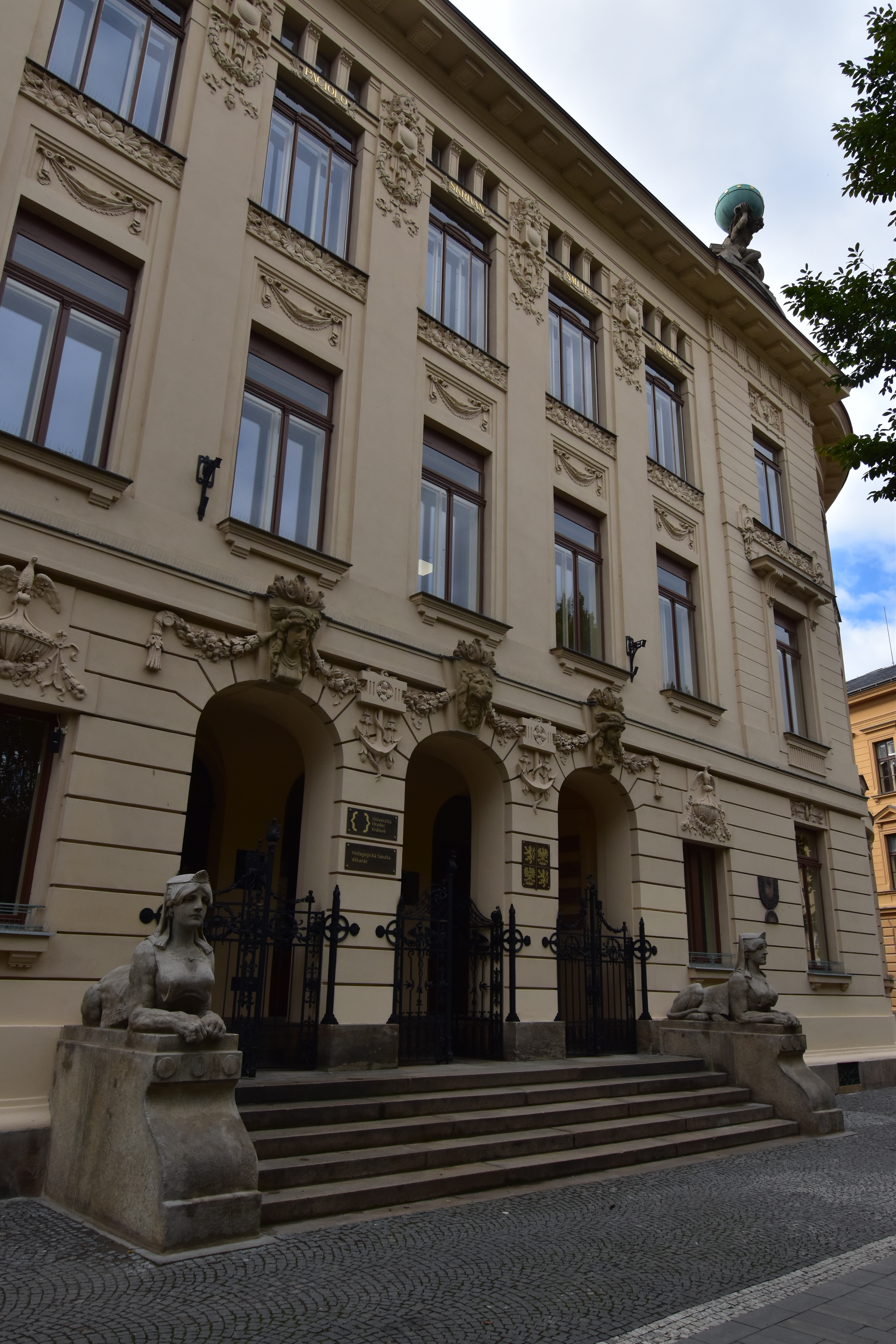
Building of the Faculty of Education, University of Hradec Králové, where its predecessor was also based.

=== Pedagogical Institute ===
The training of future teachers in Hradec Králové has a long tradition dating back to 1775. In 1959, the Pedagogical Institute was founded to prepare students for teaching at both levels of primary school. František Zeman attended the opening of the institute on behalf of the Ministry of Education and Culture, and Zdeněk Urban was present on behalf of the Central Committee of the Communist Party of Czechoslovakia. Career communist Karel Angelis was appointed as its director.

Initially, the institute had four departments: the Department of Social Sciences, the Department of Natural Sciences and Polytechnic Education, the Department of Art, Music and Physical Education, and the Department of Production Fundamentals. By 1961, there were already 7 departments: Marxism-Leninism, Pedagogical Sciences, Languages and History, Natural Sciences, Art and Music Education, Physical Education, and Theory of Production and Vocational Training. In 1964, the number of departments rose to nine with the addition of the Department of Mathematics and Physics and the Department of Biology.

=== Faculty of Education in Hradec Králové ===
By the Act of the Presidium of the National Assembly of August 12, 1964, No. 166/1964 Coll., on Pedagogical Institutes, the independent Faculty of Education in Hradec Králové was established by merging the Pedagogical Institutes in Hradec Králové and Pardubice. The existing director of the Hradec Králové institute, Karel Angelis, became the first dean. The school was strongly affected by the events of the Prague Spring. In January 1968, the party organization expressed support for the new leadership of the KSČ, followed by the faculty's scientific council in February. In April of the same year, following extensive criticism, the incumbent dean Angelis abdicated, and Assoc. Prof. Dr. Ing. Josef Kittler, CSc., became the new dean.

Following the Warsaw Pact invasion of Czechoslovakia, the faculty reacted with a joint statement alongside the Faculty of Medicine and regional branches of the Union of Theatre Professionals and Visual Artists, intended as a protest to scientists, teachers, and artists worldwide. At the same time, Dean Kittler published his protest stance against the invasion in the newspaper Pochodeň. This culminated in a week-long occupation strike at the faculty, with a second strike taking place in January 1969 during the funeral of Jan Palach.

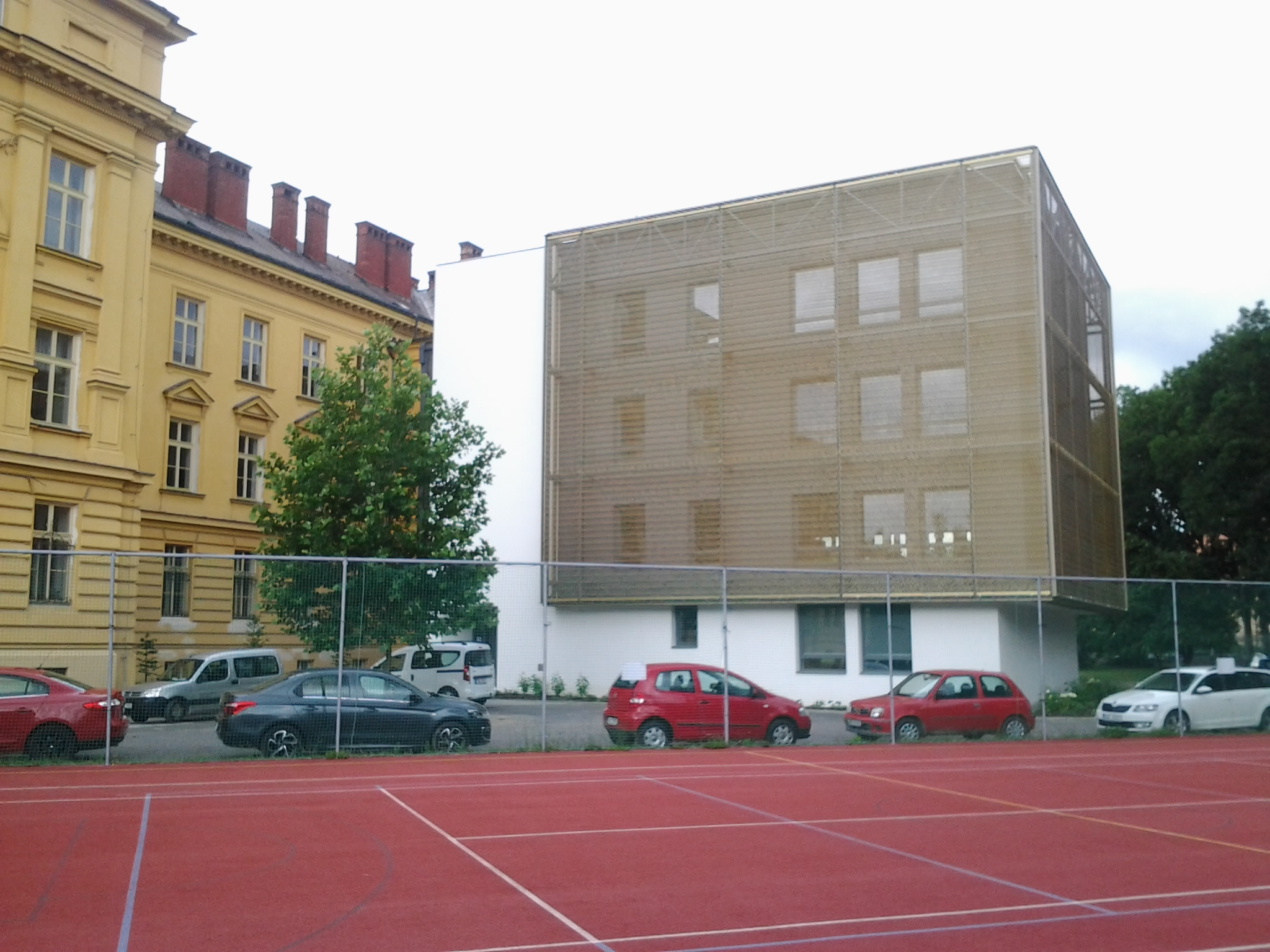
The so-called "Cube" (Kostka), part of the Bishop's Grammar School, acquired by the Faculty of Education in the 1980s.

In December 1969, Josef Kittler resigned from the dean's position under pressure from normalizers, and Karel Angelis returned to the post, initiating extensive vetting at the faculty. However, on September 30, 1970, he resigned from office due to an offer for the position of Deputy Minister of Education. The screenings lasted until 1972, resulting in 40 employees being forced to leave the faculty. Assoc. Prof. Jaroslav Máslo succeeded Assoc. Prof. Angelis in February 1971, but was forced to resign after less than a year due to an incident where his son, along with three other students, was arrested for "defaming" the state.

At the beginning of the 1970s, the faculty began to develop. In 1969, an ODRA 1003 computing center was installed there, and a television teaching workplace was established in cooperation with Czechoslovak Television. For the film "Rentgenologie srdce" (Radiology of the Heart), they won the "Main Prize" in the medical sciences category and the Czechoslovak Television Prize at the Academia Film Olomouc film festival in 1976. In the 1980s, the Faculty of Education acquired part of the New Borromeo building, known as the "Cube" (Kostka). Preparation for teaching students at all school levels began there only after 1976 on the basis of higher education reform.

During the Velvet Revolution, a university strike committee was established at the faculty. It was at the initiative of its members that the so-called paper wall was created on Ulrich Square. On Tuesday, November 21, 1989, the student occupation of the Na Kotli dormitories began. After the Velvet Revolution, some staff members from the 1960s returned to the school, and the school established many international contacts with other universities.

=== University of Education ===
On July 1, 1992, a new higher education institution named the University of Education in Hradec Králové (Vysoká škola pedagogická v Hradci Králové) was formed from the independent Faculty of Education. On February 15, 1993, another faculty was added, the Faculty of Management and Information Technology, which was renamed the Faculty of Informatics and Management in 2000.

=== University of Hradec Králové ===
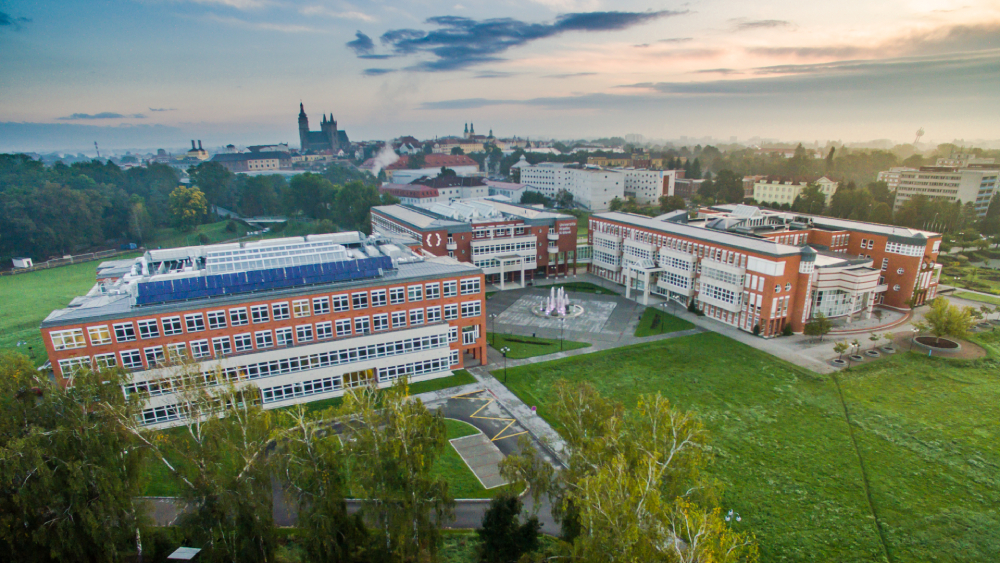
Na Soutoku Campus

On September 1, 2000, the name of the entire higher education institution changed to the University of Hradec Králové. On September 1, 2005, the Philosophical Faculty began operations (originally as the *Faculty of Humanities*), making the school a three-faculty university. Five years later, on September 1, 2010, the Faculty of Science was established following the transformation of the Faculty of Education. On January 1, 2011, the Institute of Social Work was created to cover social disciplines previously taught at the Faculty of Education.

Since 2010, the university has implemented a professional unified visual style, presenting itself as a modern and dynamic institution (designed by Jiří Toman and Michal Kukačka).

In 1995, construction began on a new common teaching building (Campus Na Soutoku) near the confluence of the Elbe and Orlice rivers. The financial costs for this construction amounted to 250 million CZK, and construction took place between 1995 and 1997. In a national architectural competition, the building won the title "Building of the Year 1998". In the spring of 2008, the common teaching facility was complemented by a completed modern building with a total investment of 360 million CZK, housing the Faculty of Informatics and Management. The building of the UHK Faculty of Science was built in a record 21 months, and its construction, together with equipment, cost 450 million CZK; in the autumn of 2016, it completed and closed the center of the emerging complex. In 2019, the space inside the Na Soutoku campus was ceremonially named Václav Havel Square.

During the COVID-19 pandemic, the university switched to distance learning in the 2020/21 academic year. In the following academic year, the university switched to in-person teaching with safety measures. From 2020 to 2022, the renovation of the Philosophical Faculty building took place at a cost of nearly 200 million CZK. The faculty was temporarily relocated to Building E on Víta Nejedlého Street. Repair of the building housing the Faculty of Education began in 2022 and was completed in 2025. The faculty dean's office was temporarily moved to the aforementioned Building E.

During the war in Ukraine in 2022, the university provided extraordinary scholarships for Ukrainian students and simultaneously severed cooperation with Russian universities.

== Symbols ==
The Rector's Sceptre, designed by Jan Hásek, is in the shape of a linden leaf, with a golden ball in the centre, and a silver lion at the top, symbolising the city of Hradec Králové. The sceptre was given to the university by the City of Hradec Králové.

The Statutory emblem consists of a central crowned Czech lion, looking heraldically left and holding in its forepaws a large letter "G". The figure also represents a part of the City of Hradec Králové emblem. In the circular inscription, the full title of the university is written in Latin.

== Faculties ==
Currently, the university consists of four faculties:

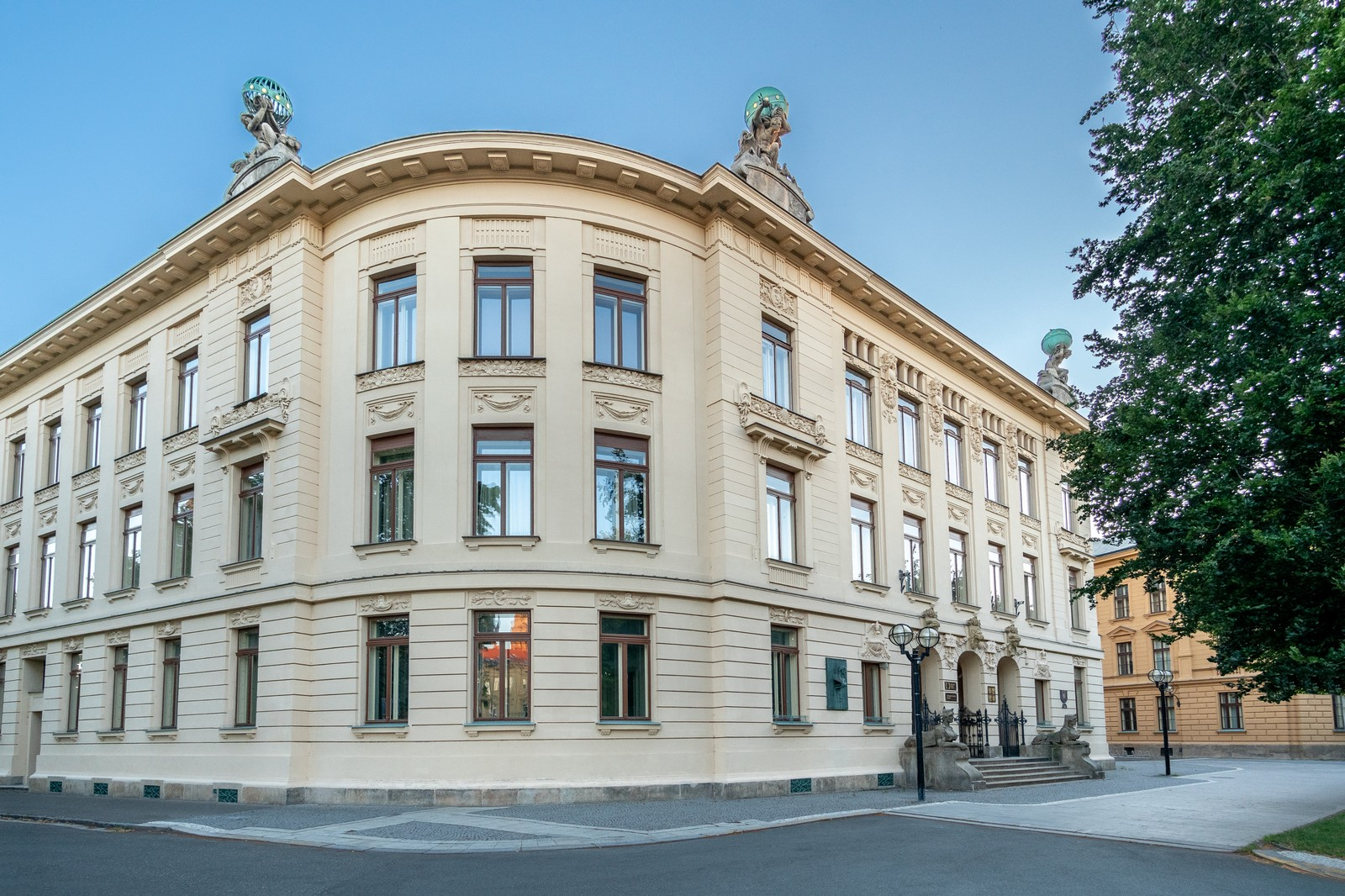
Faculty of Education UHK

=== Faculty of Education ===
The Faculty of Education (PdF UHK) is the oldest part of the University of Hradec Králové, formed in 1964 by the merger of the pedagogical institutes in Hradec Králové and Pardubice. It focuses primarily on humanities, pedagogical, social, physical education, and other areas of teaching and non-teaching studies. In addition, the faculty offers lifelong learning programs, attended by over 1,700 participants. Its predecessor was the Pedagogical Institute, established in 1959. About 180 academic staff work at the Faculty of Education, educating around 3,000 students annually, of whom approximately 600 graduate successfully each year.

The faculty building on Freedom Square (Náměstí Svobody) has been protected as a cultural monument since 1981.

The Dean is PhDr. Nella Mlsová, Ph.D.

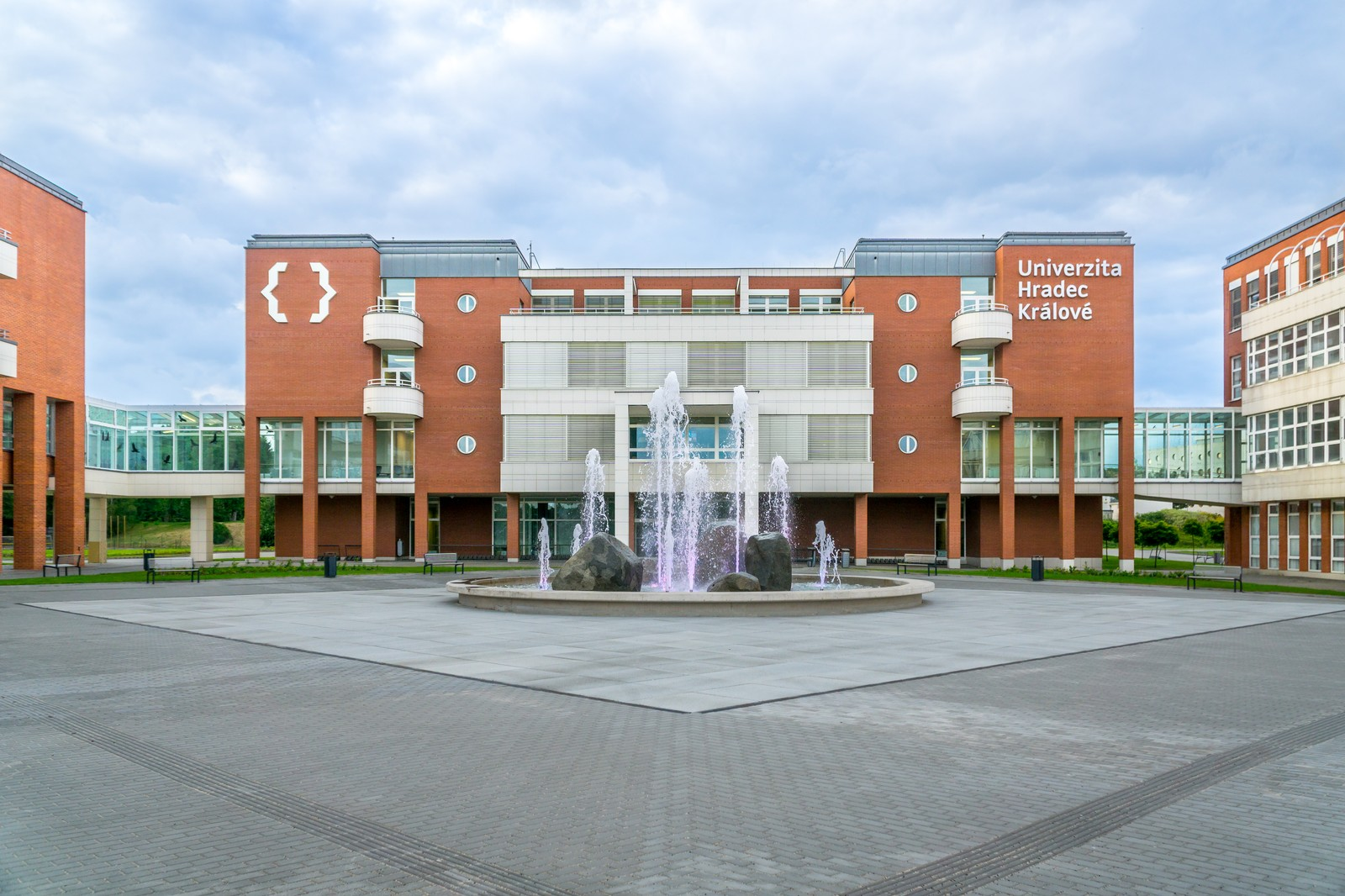
Faculty of Informatics and Management UHK

=== Faculty of Informatics and Management ===
The Faculty of Informatics and Management, University of Hradec Králové (FIM UHK) was established in 1993 as the Faculty of Management and Information Technology and transformed into the current FIM in 2000. It offers education in the fields of informatics, economics, management, and tourism. The faculty records a large number of international exchanges; up to 25% of graduates have experience studying abroad. As of 2020, the faculty has around 1,500 students and up to 50% of study programs in a foreign language, in which up to 250 foreign students study. It has been based at the Na Soutoku campus since 2008.

The Dean is Prof. Ing. Mgr. Petra Marešová, MBA, Ph.D.

=== Philosophical Faculty ===
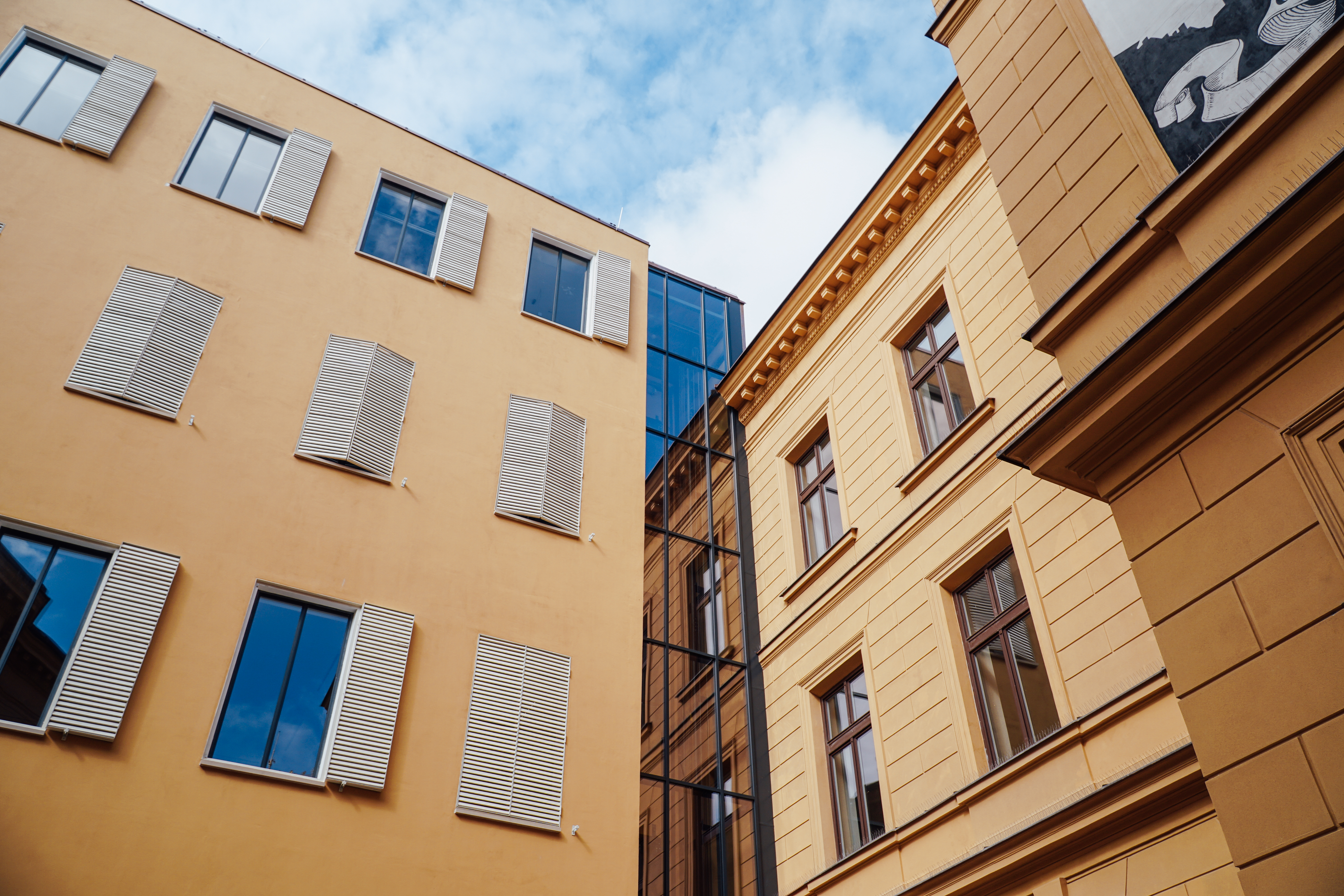
Philosophical Faculty UHK

The Philosophical Faculty, University of Hradec Králové (FF UHK) joined the two existing faculties in 2005, then under the original name *Faculty of Humanities*. The main mission of the FF is to provide education in areas belonging to the traditional focus of philosophical faculties (history, archival science, political science, archaeology, philosophy, and sociology). Since the 2017/2018 academic year, the Institute of Social Work has also been part of the FF UHK. Currently, around 1,000 students study at the faculty.

The Philosophical Faculty building is located on Freedom Square next to the Faculty of Education.

The Dean is Mgr. Jan Prouza, Ph.D.

=== Faculty of Science ===
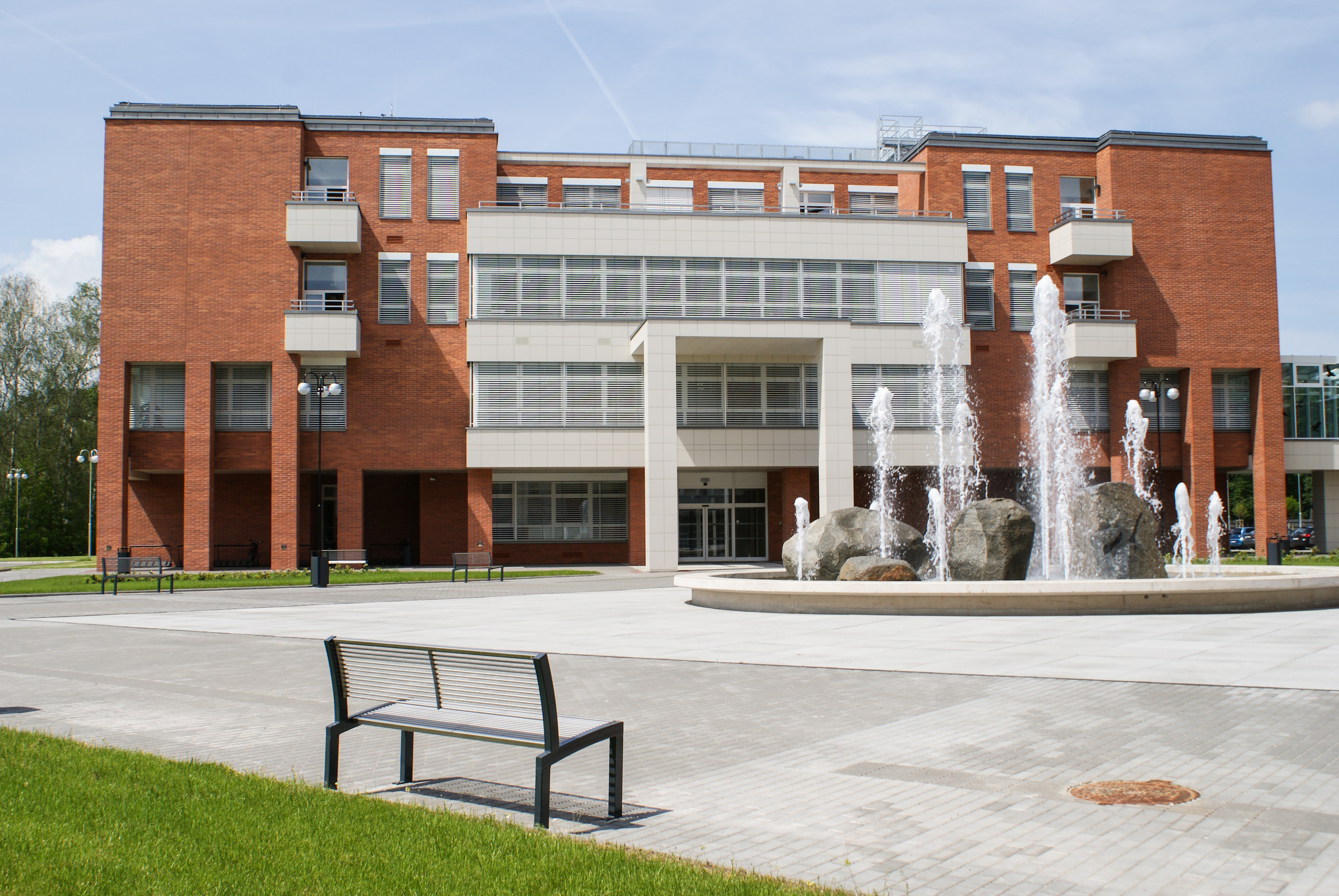
Faculty of Science UHK

The Faculty of Science, University of Hradec Králové (PřF) is the fourth and youngest faculty of the University of Hradec Králové, established in 2010. The modernly equipped building provides education to 650 students in the fields of natural sciences, ecology, toxicology, and teaching. Currently, employees and students of the faculty are involved in 20 prestigious national and international scientific research projects. In 2017, Building S was ceremonially opened, completing the Na Soutoku campus.

The Dean is RNDr. Alena Myslivcová Fučíková, Ph.D.

== Campus ==
The university currently consists of four faculties: the Faculty of Education, Faculty of Informatics and Management, Philosophical Faculty, and Faculty of Science, all except the Philosophical Faculty are based on one campus known as Na Soutoku.

The university's Common Education Building was awarded by Czech architects as the "Building of the Year" in 1998. The adjacent building of the Faculty of Informatics and Management was completed in 2008, costing 360 million CZK. Next to that is the Faculty of Science, built in 2016. Construction took 21 months and the cost was approximately 450 million CZK.

In 2022, the Philosophical Faculty relocated to its newly reconstructed building. At the moment, the Faculty of Education administrative building is undergoing reconstruction. The faculty is temporarily located on Vít Nejedlý Street during the work. The university also plans to build a facility specialised in natural and social sciences with laboratories, which will enclose the center of the campus.

UHK has two halls of residence, the Palach Halls of Residence (Palachovy koleje), and Vít Nejedlý Halls of Residence (Koleje Víta Nejedlého), with a capacity of around 900 beds. The Palach Halls of Residence are under ongoing renovation.

== Gallery ==
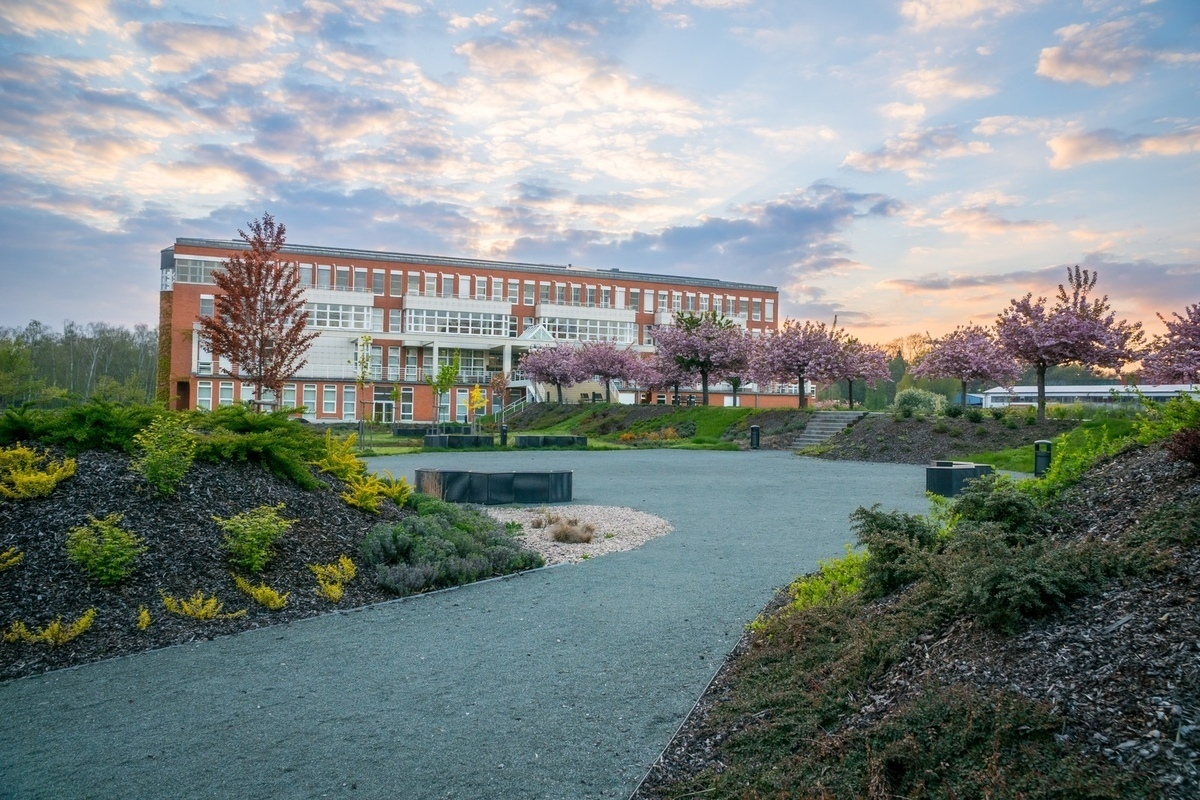
University of Hradec Králové

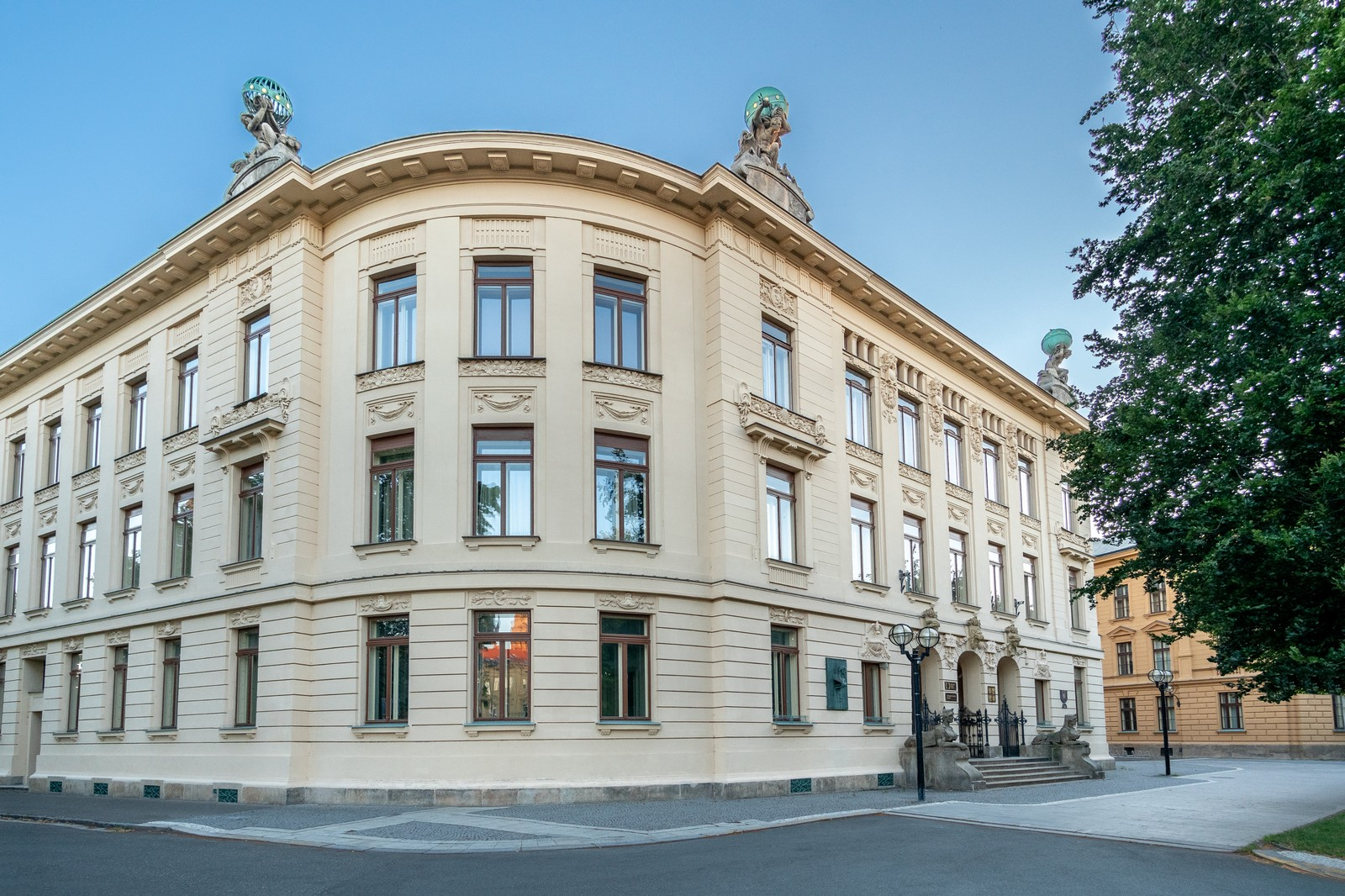
Faculty of Education

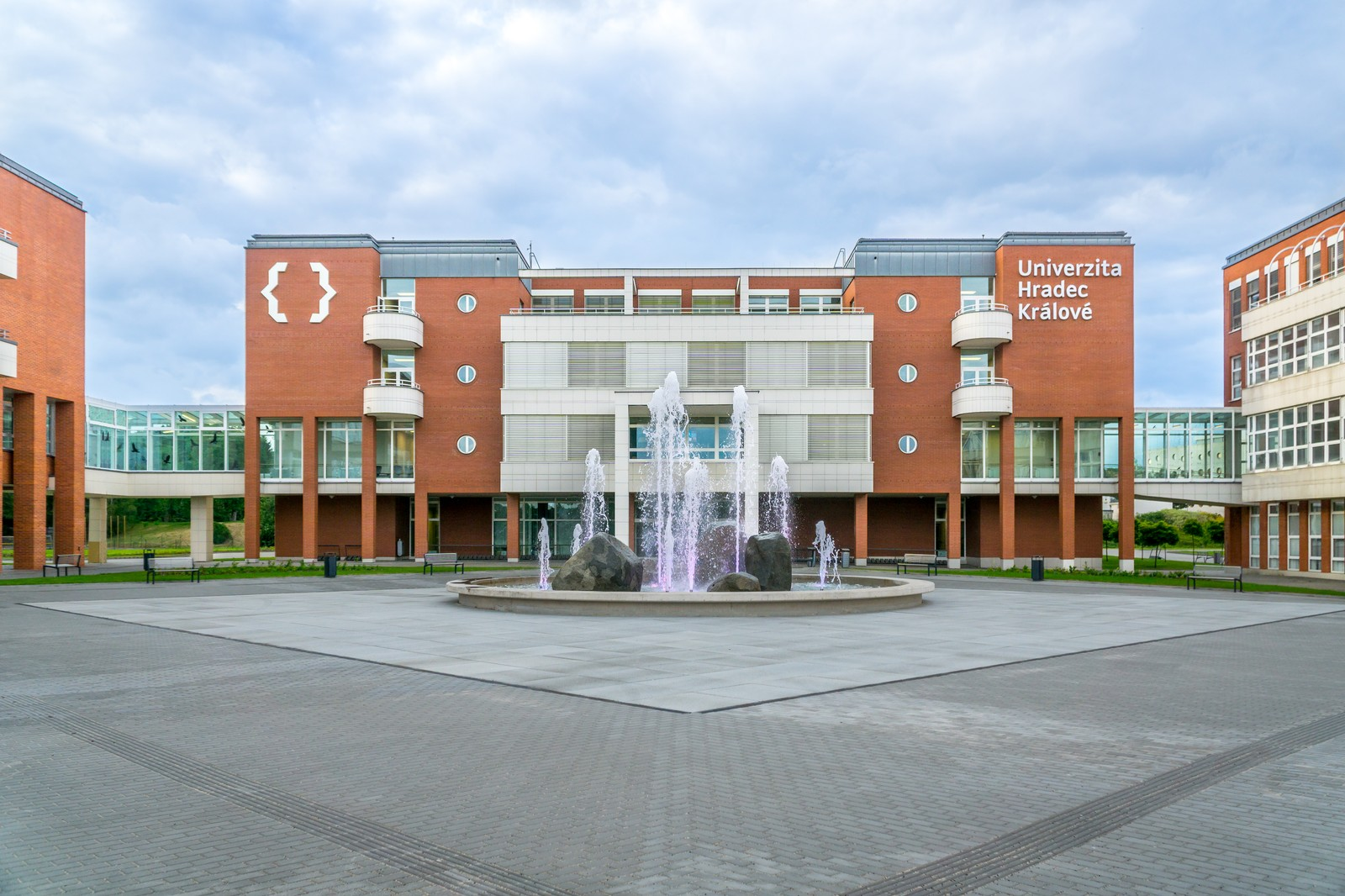
Faculty of Informatics and Management

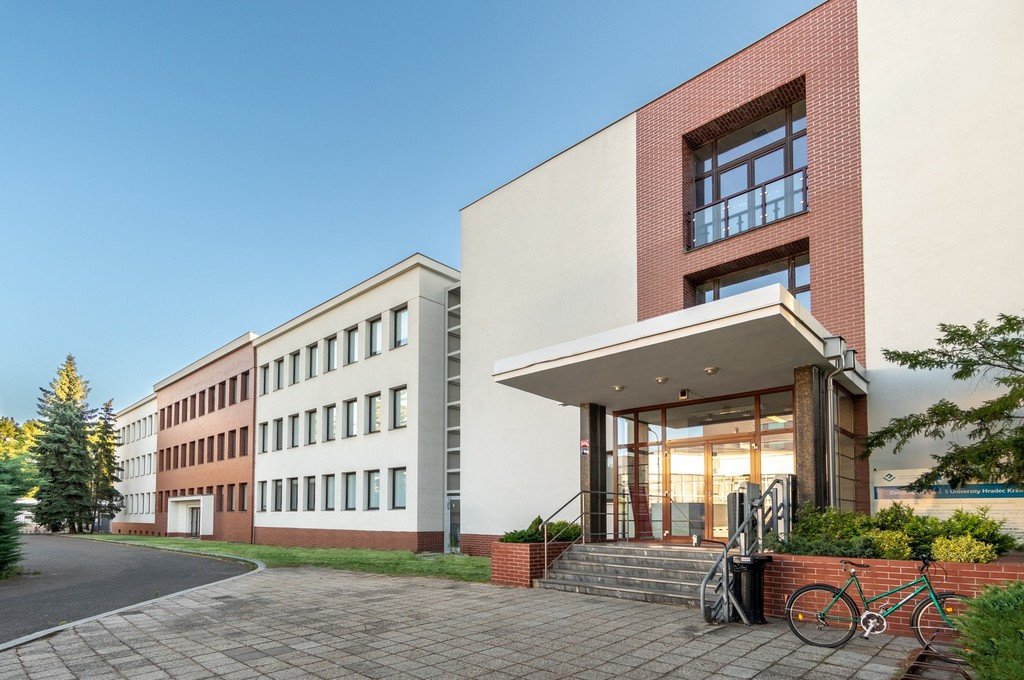
Philosophical Faculty

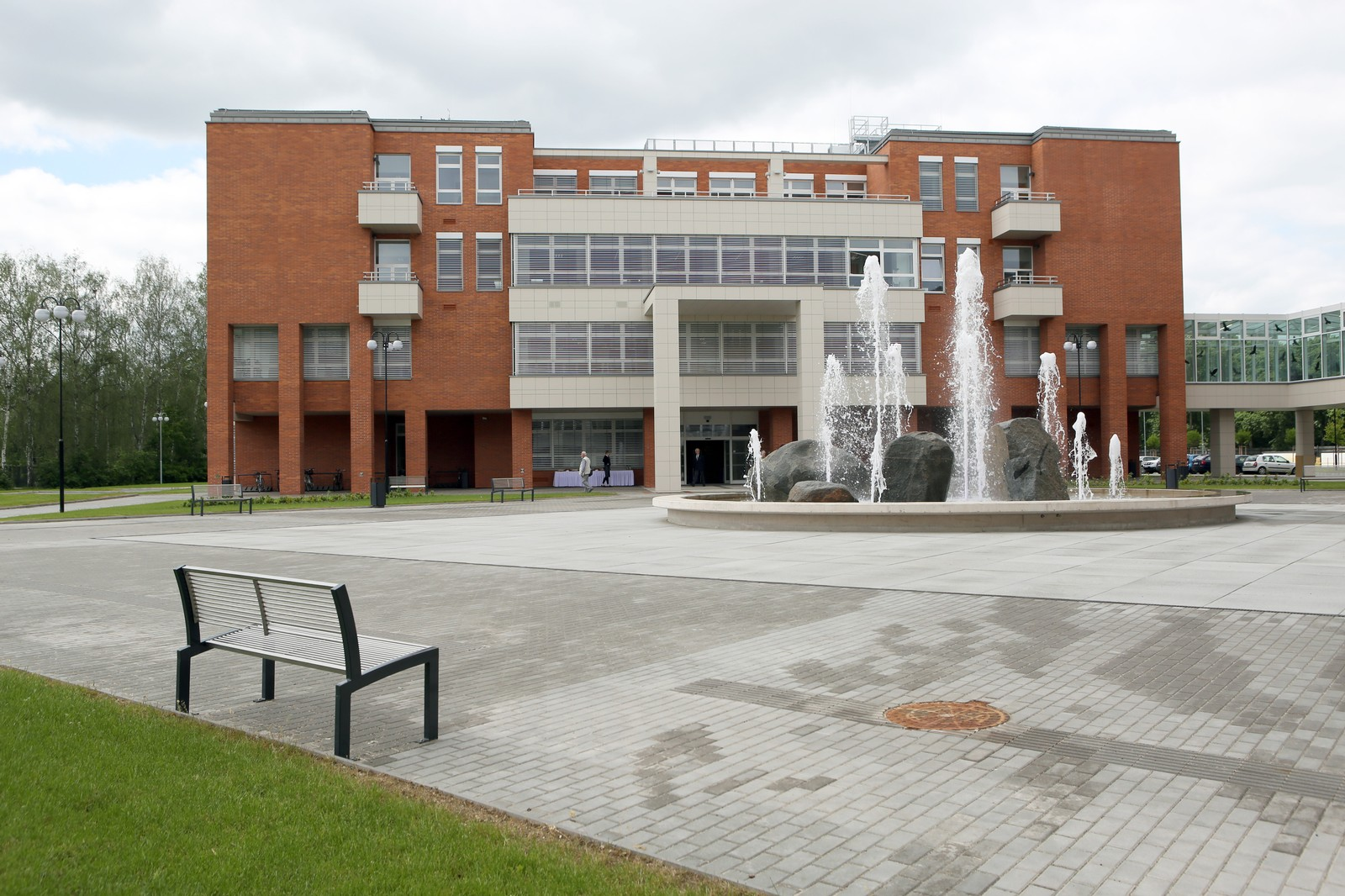
Faculty of Science

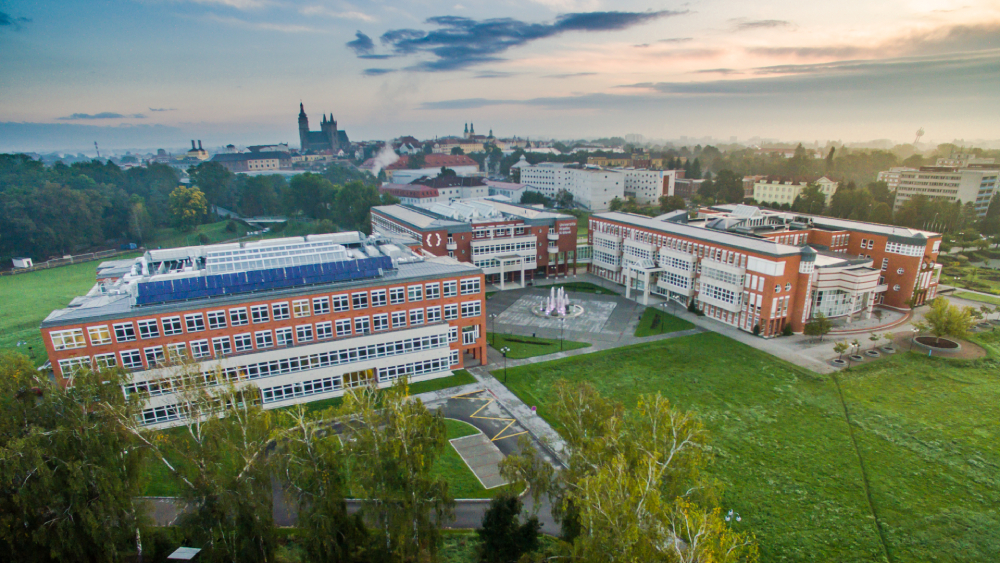
Na Soutoku University Campus

== Management ==
- Rector: Jan Kříž
- Vice-Rector for International Affairs: Leona Stašová
- Vice-Rector for Student Affairs, Quality, and Creative Activities: František Vaníček
- Vice-Rector for Science, Research, and Knowledge Transfer: Kamil Kuča
- Vice-Rector for Strategy, Development, and Digitalization: Michal Strobach

== Student Associations ==
There are a number of student associations at the university that seek to support student life on campus. These include, for example, the Academic Film Club, which arranges film screenings for students at the Bio Central cinema, or the Student Union, which organizes sports events, workshops, and lectures. Other active groups include:

- ESN Hradec Králové (branch of the Erasmus Student Network)
- Hradec Student Section of the Czech Archival Society (at the Department of Auxiliary Historical Sciences and Archival Science FF UHK, part of the Czech Archival Society)
- Otevřeno Hradec Králové (part of the Otevřeno organization)
- Political Science Club UHK (at the Department of Political Science FF UHK)
- First Steps at FIM (První kroky na FIM)
- Sešlost
- SH1UK (at the Department of Sociology FF UHK)
- Skrz naskrz (university-wide student magazine)
- Student Historical Club UHK (at the Institute of History FF UHK)
- Student Club Salaš (association of Catholic students)
- Student Club of the USP (under the Institute of Social Work)
- Student Archaeology Club UHK (at the Department of Archaeology FF UHK)
- Student Club Libomudravna (at the Department of Philosophy and Social Sciences FF UHK)

== Honorary Doctorates ==
The University of Hradec Králové also awards honorary doctorates. Their recipients include:

- Viktor Fischl, a Czech, Jewish, and Israeli poet, novelist, translator, and publicist.
- Karel Otčenášek, a Czech Catholic bishop, linguist, and Esperantist.
- 2004 – Adolf Melezinek, an Austrian-Czech electrical engineer, founder of engineering pedagogy, and author of specialized secondary school textbooks in the fields of electrical engineering, radio engineering, and educational theory.
- 2006 – František Šmahel, a Czech historian and university educator.
- 2006 – Milan Myška, a Czech historian and professor.
- 2012 – Petr Piťha, a Czech Catholic priest, Bohemist, linguist, educator, and Minister of Education in the first government of Václav Klaus.
- 2013 – Dominik Duka, a Czech cardinal and former Bishop of Hradec Králové and Archbishop of Prague (for assistance in establishing scientific cooperation between the university and higher education institutions in the Latin American region).
- 2015 – Zdeněk Svěrák
- 2018 – Jan Petrof, piano manufacturer.
- 2022 – Marek Eben, presenter, actor, and composer.

== Other University Units ==
- University Library UHK
- Gaudeamus Publishing House
- University Dormitories
- Lifelong Learning
- Information, Counseling, and Career Center UHK
- Augustin – Support Center for Students with Specific Needs
