= Chris J. Harris =

Chris J Harris
- Born: United Kingdom
- Education: Leicester University, UK
- Known for: Intelligent Control
- Awards: FREng (1996); IET Faraday Medal (2001)
- Scientific career
- Fields: Control engineering
- Workplaces: University of Southampton, UK; Imperial College, UK; Oxford University, UK; Manchester University, UK
- Thesis: Theory and Stability of Pulse Frequency Modulated Systems

Chris Harris is a British control engineer who is Emeritus Professor of Computational Intelligence at the University of Southampton, UK.

== Education ==
Harris was born and educated in Portsmouth, Hampshire, and he received his university education at the University of Leicester (BSc), his MA from Oxford University, and Ph.D. from University of Southampton, UK.

== Career ==
Harris had previously worked at the Universities of Hull, UMIST, Oxford, Imperial, and Cranfield, He had also worked at the UK Ministry of Defence, MoD. He had authored or co-authored 12 books and over 300 research papers. He was the associate editor of numerous international journals including Automatica, Engineering Applications of AI, International Journal of General Systems Engineering, International Journal of System Science and the International Journal on Mathematical Control and Information Theory.

== Research ==
Harris's research interests include intelligent and adaptive systems theory and its application to intelligent autonomous systems, management infrastructures, intelligent control, dynamic processes, multi-sensor data fusion and systems integration.

== Awards ==
Harris was elected to the Royal Academy of Engineering in 1996. He was awarded the IEE Senior Achievement medal in 1998 for his work on autonomous systems, and the IEE highest award, the Faraday Medal, in 2001 for his work in Intelligent Control and Neurofuzzy System.
