= Luigi Emanueli =

Italian engineer (1883–1959)

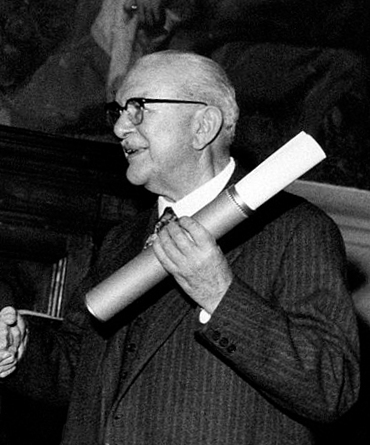
Luigi Emanueli receiving the honorary member certificate from the American Institute of Electrical Engineer

Luigi Emanueli (4 May 1883 – 17 February 1959) was an Italian engineer. He is best known for inventing the oil-filled cable in 1924. In 1959 he was awarded the Faraday Medal.
