= Journal of Family Psychology =

- Discipline: Family psychology
- Language: English
- Edited by: Arin H. Connell

Publication details
- History: 1987-present
- Publisher: American Psychological Association (United States)
- Frequency: 8/year
- Impact factor: 2.0 (2024)

Standard abbreviations
- ISO 4: J. Fam. Psychol.

Indexing
- ISSN: 0893-3200 (print); 1939-1293 (web)

Links
- Journal homepage; Online access

The Journal of Family Psychology is a peer-reviewed academic journal published by the American Psychological Association. It was established in 1987 and covers research in family psychology. The current editor-in-chief is Arin H. Connell.

The journal has implemented the Transparency and Openness Promotion (TOP) Guidelines. The TOP Guidelines provide structure to research planning and reporting and aim at making research more transparent, accessible, and reproducible.

== Abstracting and indexing ==
The journal is abstracted and indexed by MEDLINE/PubMed and the Social Sciences Citation Index. According to the Journal Citation Reports, the journal has a 2024 impact factor of 2.0.

== Notable people ==
- George W. Howe, journal associate editor, psychologist and academic
