= Alexander Russell (electrical engineer) =

Scottish electrical engineer and educator

- Born: 15 July 1861; Ayr, Scotland
- Died: 14 January 1943 (aged 81)
- Citizenship: Scottish
- Education: Glasgow University; Caius College, Cambridge
- Engineering career
- Discipline: Electrical engineering
- Projects: Alternating current
- Awards: Faraday Medal of the Institution of Electrical Engineers

Alexander Russell, FRS (15 July 1861 – 14 January 1943) was a Scottish electrical engineer and educator.

He was born in Ayr, Scotland and educated at Glasgow University (gaining an MA in Mathematics and Physics) and Caius College, Cambridge. He was later (in 1924) awarded a doctorate.

After teaching mathematics at Cheltenham College and the Oxford Military College, he took a post at Faraday House, in Southampton Row, London, which had been newly founded to train electrical engineers. In 1909 he became the Principal, a position he held until 1939. There he pioneered the sandwich course, whereby students had a year or so in the classroom and then experienced work in industry before returning to the classroom. He also wrote a number of articles for the journal Electrician which he later published in book form.

He acted as President or vice-President of a number of societies, including the presidency of the Physical Society in 1922–24 and of the Institute of Electrical Engineers in 1923. In 1924 he was also elected a Fellow of the Royal Society, his citation acknowledging that he was "Distinguished for his knowledge of alternating current phenomena, inductances and electrostatics."

In 1940 he was awarded the Faraday Medal of the Institution of Electrical Engineers.

He died in 1943 after a long illness. He had married Edith, the daughter of H.B.Ince, MP, and had a son and a daughter.
