= George William Osborn Howe =

British electrical engineer

George William Osborn Howe D.Sc. LL.D. (4 December 1875, in Charlton, Kent – 7 November 1960) was a British electrical engineer.

After education at the Roan School, Greenwich, Howe was apprenticed to Siemens Brothers, at Woolwich, where he worked for seven years. During that time he attended evening classes at Woolwich Polytechnic (eventually merged into the University of Greenwich) and, as an outstanding student, received an Whitford Exhibition scholarship and a senior county scholarship. With this financial aid, Howe studied for three years at Armstrong College, graduating with honours in 1900. He was then employed for two years by Siemens & Halske, at Charlottenburg (Berlin).

Howe translated Adolf Thomälen's 1903 textbook Kurzes Lehrbuch der Elektrotechnik into the 1907 A Text-book of Electrical Engineering.

From 1903 to 1905 Howe was a lecturer at Hull Technical College. He became in 1905 a lecturer, and became in 1909 an assistant professor, in electrical engineering at the City and Guilds Engineering College, South Kensington (eventually merged into Imperial College London). From 1920 to 1921 he was head of the Department of Electrical Standards and Measurements at the National Physical Laboratory.

In 1921 Howe was appointed the first James Watt Professor of Electrical Engineering at the University of Glasgow. He retained his professorial chair until his retirement in 1946. He was honoured with an LL.D. in 1947.

He read several papers on wireless telegraphy before the Royal Society, the British Association, and the Physical Society of Edinburgh. In 1912 the Royal Society of Arts awarded him their silver medal for his paper Recent Developments in Radio-telegraphy. In 1924 he was an Invited Speaker of the International Congress of Mathematicians in 1924 in Toronto. The Institution of Electrical Engineers awarded him their Faraday Medal in 1956.

Howe is said to have contributed more than 300 papers to academic journals and learned societies. He was editor of the Radio Review and of The Wireless Engineer.
