= George W. Howe =

American psychologist and academic

George W. Howe is an American psychologist and academic. Howe obtained his Ph.D. from the University of Connecticut in 1981. He is a professor of clinical psychology at George Washington University, a member of Center for Contextual Genetics and Prevention Science and a vice-president of Family Process Institute. He is an associate editor of Journal of Family Psychology.

His most widely cited papers are:

- Reiss D, Hetherington EM, Plomin R, Howe GW, Simmens SJ, Henderson SH, O'connor TJ, Bussell DA, Anderson ER, Law T. Genetic questions for environmental studies: Differential parenting and psychopathology in adolescence. Archives of General Psychiatry. 1995 Nov 1;52(11):925-36. (cited 341 times according to Google Scholar as of Nov. 27, 2018
- Plomin R, Reiss D, Hetherington EM, Howe GW. Nature and nurture: genetic contributions to measures of the family environment. Developmental Psychology. 1994 Jan;30(1):32-. (cited 316 times according to Google Scholar as of Nov. 27, 2018
- Baden AD, Howe GW. Mothers' attributions and expectancies regarding their conduct-disordered children. Journal of Abnormal Child Psychology. 1992 Oct 1;20(5):467-85. (cited 167 times according to Google Scholar as of Nov. 27, 2018
