= Guido Semenza =

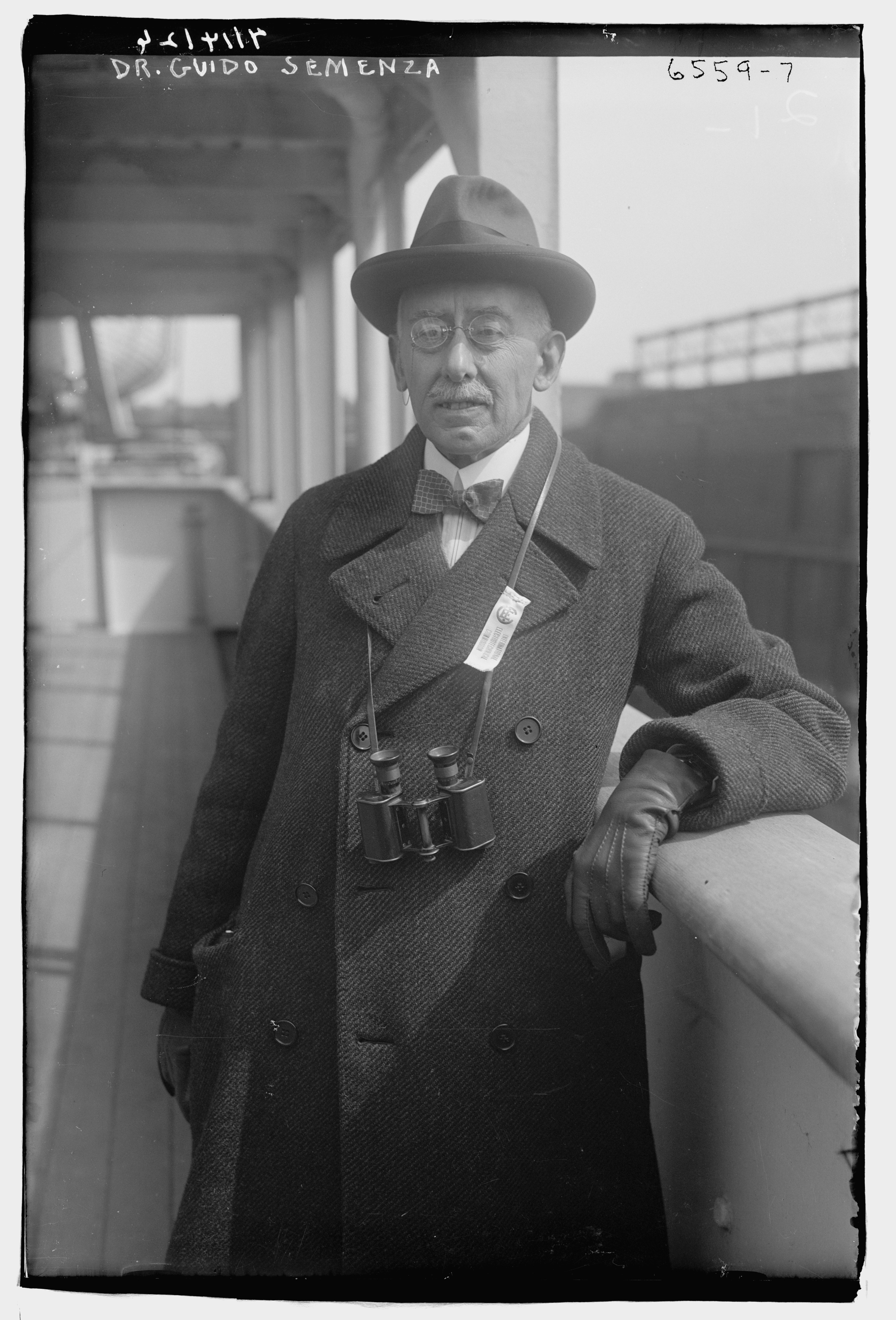
Guido Semenza

Guido Semenza (19 December 1868 – 7 November 1929) was an Italian electrical engineer, inventor, and Leonardo da Vinci scholar.

Born in London, Semenza went with his family to Italy as a child. In 1893 he graduated with an engineering degree from the Istituto Tecnico Superiore in Milan and then in 1894 graduated with an electrical engineering degree from the Institut Électrotechnique Montefiore in Liège.

He devised and put into operation the first hydro-electric plant at Paderno for the Italian Edison Co. of Milan, this work being carried out shortly after the famous experimental three-phase transmission between Lauffen and Frankfort in 1891, and the first large-scale transmission system between Tivoli and Rome in 1892. Power was transmitted from the Paderno station at 13600 volts, three-phase, and as no machinery which could work at such a pressure was then available, Semenza had himself to design suitable equipment. This pioneer work made his name famous in the electrical world, and his advice on similar problems of power supply was sought both in Italy and abroad.

In addition to his work on electrical transmission, he was also an expert in electric communication and electric traction motors. He was made a Knight of the Crown of Italy. He was president of the Italian Electrotechnical Association. He published many papers in refereed journals and from 1923 to 1927 he was president of the International Electrotechnical Commission. In 1924 he delivered the Kelvin Lecture of the Institution of Electrical Engineers, on the topic Kelvin and the Economics of the Generation and Distribution of Electrical Energy. In 1929 he was awarded the Faraday Medal of the Institution of Electrical Engineers.

Guido Semenza holds a high place among the world's electrical transmission engineers. He was the originator of the flexible pole or tower used extensively in transmission systems both in Europe and in this country.
