= George Howe (physician) =

British physician (1654/5–1710)

George Howe FRCP (1654/5 – 1710) was a Scottish physician, active in London.

== Early life ==
George Howe was the eldest son of John Howe (1630–1705), by his wife Katherine (c. 1630–1697), daughter of George Hughes. He entered the University of Glasgow in 1671 and graduated MA in 1673. He is entered on the Leyden register as 'Georgius Howe, Scotus', student of physic, on 8 September 1677, aged twenty-two.

== Career ==
He graduated MD at Leyden University, and became a Licentiate of the College of Physicians of London on 30 September 1679, Fellow in 1687, and Censor in 1707. He is described in the annals of the College as 'an industrious and eminent practiser of physic'. Howe is identified with the Querpo of Sir Samuel Garth's Dispensary who is mocked for his opposition to the planned dispensary of the College of Physicians:

His Sire's pretended pious Steps he treads,
And where the Doctor fails, the Saint succeeds.

Howe attended William III in his last illness and witnessed the post-mortem.

== Personal life ==
Howe married Lætitia Foley, apparently daughter of Philip Foley (bapt. 1648 – 1716) of Prestwood, Staffordshire (marriage licence dated 21 February 1693), by whom he left two sons, John and Philip (both dead without issue in 1729).

== Death ==
He died suddenly of apoplexy on 22 March 1710, while walking in the Poultry, and was buried in the same vault as his father in All Hallows Church, Bread Street.

== Sources ==
- Creighton, Charles; Wallis, Patrick (2004). "Howe, George (1654/5–1710), physician". Oxford Dictionary of National Biography. Oxford University Press. Retrieved 17 August 2022.
- Garth, Samuel (1699). The Dispensary; A Poem. 1st ed. London: John Nutt. p. 44 [Canto IV].
- Munk, William (1878). The Roll of the Royal College of Physicians of London. 2nd ed. Vol. 1. London: The College, Pall Mall East. p. 453.

Attribution:

- This article incorporates text from a publication now in the public domain: Creighton, Charles (1891). "Howe, George". In Lee, Sidney (ed.). Dictionary of National Biography. Vol. 28. London: Smith, Elder & Co. pp. 84–85.
