= Josef Kittler =

Josef Vaclav Kittler
- Education: University of Cambridge
- Awards: IAPR Fellow (1998); IEE/IET Fellow (1999); FREng (2000); KS Fu Prize (2006); IET Faraday Medal (2008)
- Scientific career
- Fields: Electronic engineering
- Workplaces: Surrey University
- Website: surrey.ac.uk/cvssp/people/josef_kittler/

Josef Kittler FREng is a British scientist and Distinguished Professor at University of Surrey, specialising in pattern recognition and machine intelligence.

== Biography ==
Josef Kittler received his B.A. in electrical engineering (1971), PhD in pattern recognition (1974), and ScD (1992), all from University of Cambridge. He joined Surrey University in 1986 and became distinguished professor in 2004.

He founded Centre for Vision, Speech and Signal Processing (CVSSP) in 1986 at University of Surrey and served as president of the International Association for Pattern Recognition during 1994–1996. He is Series Editor of Springer Lecture Notes in Computer Science.

== Academic works ==
=== On combining classifiers ===
They proposed the algebraic combination methods under the probabilistic framework used in ensembles of classifiers. In detail, denote $h^j_i(x)$ the probability of instance $x$ belonging to class $c_j$ output from the learner $h_i$, then the median rule generates the combined output according to $H^j(x) = median((h^j_i(x))$, where the median operator is over base classifier $i$.

== Awards and honours ==
- IAPR Fellow (1998).

"For contributions to computer vision and pattern recognition, and for outstanding leadership in IAPR".

- IEE/IET Fellow (1999).

IET fellowship honours those who "Lead by example. Inspire the next generation. Help to shape the profession."

- FREng (2000).

Royal Academy of Engineering Fellows represent "the nation's best engineering researchers, innovators, entrepreneurs, business and industry leaders."

- KS Fu Prize (2006).

This biennial prize is given to a living person "in recognition of an outstanding technical contribution to the field of pattern recognition".

- IET Faraday Medal (2008).

The most prestigious of the IET Achievement Medals.

- EURASIP Fellow (2009).

"For contributions to pattern recognition, image processing and computer vision".

== Selected works ==
=== Books ===
- Pierre A Devijver; Josef Kittler (1982). Pattern recognition: a statistical approach. Englewood Cliffs: Prentice Hall. ISBN 978-0136542360.

=== Articles ===
- Josef Kittler; Robert P.W. Duin; et al. (1998). "On combining classifiers". IEEE Transactions on Pattern Analysis and Machine Intelligence. 20 (3): 226–239. doi:10.1109/34.667881.
- Josef Kittler; Alkoot, F.M. (2003). "Sum versus vote fusion in multiple classifier systems". IEEE Transactions on Pattern Analysis and Machine Intelligence. 25 (1): 110–115. doi:10.1109/TPAMI.2003.1159950.
- Chi Ho Chan; Josef Kittler; et al. (2015). "Full ranking as local descriptor for visual recognition: A comparison of distance metrics on $s_n$". Pattern Recognition. 48 (4): 1328–1336. Bibcode:2015PatRe..48.1328C. doi:10.1016/j.patcog.2014.10.010.
