= Centre for Secure Information Technologies =

In 2008 Queen's University Belfast's Institute of Electronics, Communications and Information Technology (ECIT) was chosen to host the Centre for Secure Information Technologies (CSIT), one of only seven UK Innovation and Knowledge Centres (IKCs). Funded by the Engineering and Physical Sciences Research Council (EPSRC) and UK Technology Strategy Board, IKCs are a key component of the UK's approach to the commercialization of emerging technologies through creating early stage critical mass in an area of disruptive technology.

CSIT is recognised by GCHQ and EPSRC as an Academic Centre of Excellence in Cyber Security Research (ACEs-CSR). It was one of the first tranche of eight UK universities conducting world class research in the field of cyber security recognised as ACE-CSRs in 2012. CSIT also hosts an annual World Cyber Security Technology Research Summit at the ECIT Institute in Belfast.
