= John McCanny =

Professor Sir John McCanny CBE FRS FREng MRIA
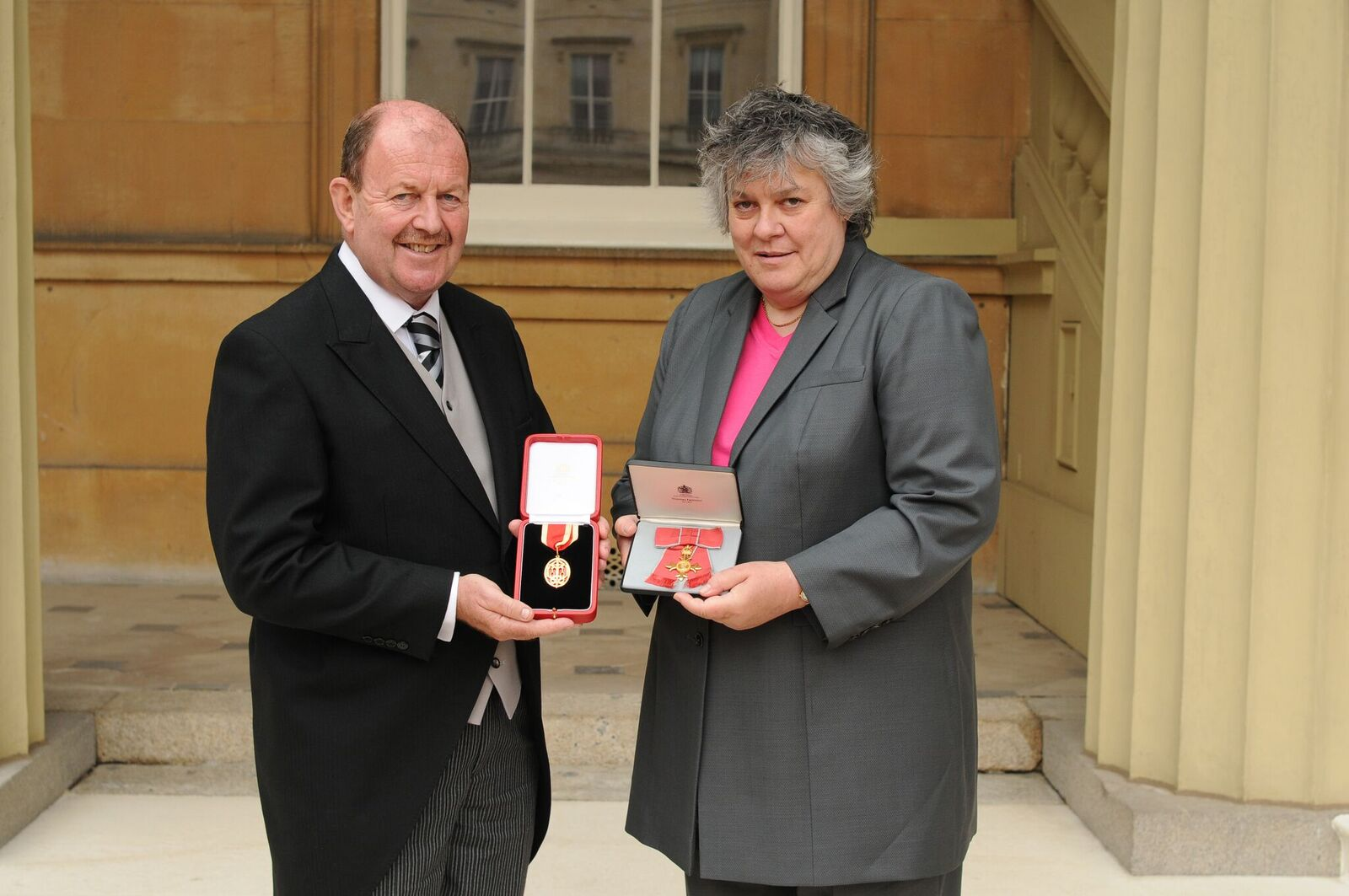
- Sir John McCanny (left) and Sally Wheeler at their Knighthood/OBE investitures on 16 June 2017
- Born: 25 June 1952 (age 74)
- Education: University of Manchester, University of Ulster
- Known for: Digital Signal Processing
- Awards: FRS (2002); FREng (1995); CBE (2017); Faraday Medal (2006)
- Scientific career
- Fields: Digital Signal Processing
- Workplaces: Queen's University Belfast

Sir John Vincent McCanny (born 25 June 1952) is the emeritus Regius Professor of Electronics and Computer Engineering at Queen's University Belfast, and director of the Institute of Electronics, Communications and Information Technology.

== Education ==
He earned a BSc from the University of Manchester in 1973, a PhD in Physics from the University of Ulster in 1978, and a DSc in Electrical and Electronics Engineering from Queen's University Belfast in 1998.

== Career ==
John was a professor at Queen's University of Belfast. He was also active in industries. He has co-founded two companies - Amphion Semiconductor Ltd. (acquired by Conexant) and Audio Processing Technology Ltd (acquired by Cambridge Silicon Radio). He is on the board of Titan IC Systems Ltd.

== Honours and awards ==
- In 1995 He was elected a Fellow of the Royal Academy of Engineering
- 1999 He was elected a Fellow of the Institute of Electrical and Electronics Engineers.
- 2002 He was elected a Fellow of the Royal Society
- 2003 He won the "RDS - Irish Times Boyle Medal for Scientific Excellence".
- 2006 He was awarded the Faraday Medal by the Institution of Engineering and Technology.
- 2011 He was awarded the Cunningham Medal by the Royal Irish Academy.
- 2017 McCanny was knighted in the 2017 New Year Honours for services to higher education and economic development.
