= July 1955 =

Month of 1955

<<	July 1955					>>
Su	Mo	Tu	We	Th	Fr	Sa
					1	2
3	4	5	6	7	8	9
10	11	12	13	14	15	16
17	18	19	20	21	22	23
24	25	26	27	28	29	30
31

The following events occurred in July 1955:

== July 1, 1955 (Friday) ==
- South Vietnam's air force, the Republic of Vietnam Air Force, is established.
- East Germany appoints the initial management committee for its new national airline, which it names Deutsche Lufthansa (abbreviated DLH) after the defunct pre-1945 German airline Deutsche Luft Hansa, even though the West German airline Luftag had bought the rights to that name in August 1954 and named itself Lufthansa.
- The UK's first atomic bomber unit, No. 138 Squadron RAF, is formed, flying Vickers Valiants from RAF Gaydon in Warwickshire.
- The final of the 1955 Egypt Cup football tournament is won by Zamalek SC.
- The Imperial Bank of India is renamed the State Bank of India.
- KOTA TV channel 3 in Rapid City, SD (ABC/NBC) begins broadcasting.
- Born:
  - Nikolai Demidenko, classical pianist, in Anisimovo, Russian SSR.
  - Li Keqiang, Premier of the People's Republic of China, in Hefei.
  - Lisa Scottoline, American writer of legal thrillers, in Philadelphia.

== July 2, 1955 (Saturday) ==
- Bergsdalen Church, in Vaksdal, Norway, designed by Leiv Tvilde, is consecrated.
- Sen. Lyndon Baines Johnson, during a visit to his friend George Brown in Middleburg, Virginia, has a heart attack and is rushed to Bethesda Naval Hospital in Maryland.

== July 3, 1955 (Sunday) ==
- The 1955 Belgian motorcycle Grand Prix takes place at the Circuit de Spa-Francorchamps. The 500cc category is won by Giuseppe Colnago.

== July 4, 1955 (Monday) ==
- Mexico's legislative election is a victory for the Institutional Revolutionary Party, which wins 153 of the 162 seats in the Chamber of Deputies.

== July 5, 1955 (Tuesday) ==
- The 5th Berlin International Film Festival concludes, with the Golden Bear being awarded to Die Ratten by audience vote.

== July 6, 1955 (Wednesday) ==
- Born: Sherif Ismail, Egyptian politician, Prime Minister 2015 - 2018 (d. 2023).

== July 7, 1955 (Thursday) ==
- The New Zealand Special Air Service is formed.
- Burhan Alden Aaian becomes Minister of Foreign Affairs of the Kingdom of Iraq.

== July 8, 1955 (Friday) ==
- Walter H. Bourque Jr., a 17-year-old shoe factory worker in Manchester, New Hampshire, was taken into custody after killing his four-year-old neighbor. Bourque would remain in prison for more than 69 years, the second-longest sentence served in U.S. history, before dying in custody at the age of 87 on January 10, 2025.
- Burapha University is established in Chonburi Province, Thailand.

== July 9, 1955 (Saturday) ==
- Pacifist Bertrand Russell issues his Russell–Einstein Manifesto in London, highlighting the dangers posed by nuclear weapons and calling for world leaders to seek peaceful resolutions to international conflict. The signatories include eleven pre-eminent intellectuals and scientists, including Albert Einstein.
- London police procedural Dixon of Dock Green, starring Jack Warner, premieres on the BBC Television Service in the UK; it will run for 21 years.
- The song "Rock Around the Clock" by Bill Haley & His Comets becomes the first rock and roll song to reach No. 1 on the United States' Billboard pop music charts.
- Born: Jimmy Smits, American actor, in New York City.

== July 10, 1955 (Sunday) ==
- Jorge Luis Borges is appointed Director of the National Library of the Argentine Republic.
- Dies: Francis Augustus Hamer, retired Texas Ranger, and one of the men who helped hunt down Bonnie and Clyde, dies at 71 in Austin, Texas, as a result of a heat stroke 2 years earlier.

== July 11, 1955 (Monday) ==
- The Nelson baronetcy is created in the baronetage of the United Kingdom for engineer Sir George Nelson, later Baron Nelson of Stafford.
- Future astronaut Neil Armstrong begins work as a test pilot at the High-Speed Flight Station of the National Advisory Committee for Aeronautics (NACA), located at Edwards Air Force Base in California, having transferred there from the NACA's Lewis Flight Propulsion Laboratory in Cleveland, Ohio.
- Congress authorizes all US currency to say "In God We Trust".

== July 12, 1955 (Tuesday) ==
- Mexican passenger ship La Flecha sinks off Veracruz with the loss of 30 lives.

== July 13, 1955 (Wednesday) ==
- British cargo ship Geologist collides with Liberian-registered SS Sun Princess and sinks with the loss of twenty of her 42 crew.
- Dies: Ruth Ellis, 28, Welsh nightclub hostess, hanged for murder in London, becoming the last woman ever to be executed in the United Kingdom; Stanley Price, 61, US film and television actor.

== July 14, 1955 (Thursday) ==
- The Federal Express train from Washington, D.C., to Boston, Massachusetts, derails in Bridgeport, Connecticut, US, killing the engine driver.

== July 15, 1955 (Friday) ==
- The Air Force Bal Bharati School is founded in New Delhi, India.

== July 16, 1955 (Saturday) ==
- The 1955 British Grand Prix is held at Aintree Motor Racing Circuit and is won by Stirling Moss.

== July 17, 1955 (Sunday) ==
- The Disneyland theme park opens in Anaheim, California, for a preview event broadcast on the American Broadcasting Company television network.

== July 18, 1955 (Monday) ==
- Disneyland opens to the public.
- The first nuclear-generated electrical power is sold commercially, by National Reactor Testing Station, partially powering the town of Arco, Idaho.
- The Illinois Governor, William Stratton, signs the "Loyalty Oath Act", passed by the State Legislature, which mandates all public employees take a loyalty oath to Illinois and the United States, or lose their jobs.
- The first Geneva Summit meeting between the United States, the Soviet Union, the United Kingdom, and France begins. It ends on July 23.

== July 19, 1955 (Tuesday) ==
- The 1955 World Archery Championships open in Helsinki, Finland.

== July 20, 1955 (Wednesday) ==
- The fourth Miss USA beauty pageant is held at Long Beach, California, and is won by Carlene King Johnson.
- Died: Calouste Gulbenkian, 86, Armenian businessman and philanthropist (b. 1869)

== July 21, 1955 (Thursday) ==
- The BBC brings into service its Divis transmitter, its first permanent 405-line VHF Band I facility serving Northern Ireland, marking the launch of a television service for Northern Ireland; the 35 kW transmissions can also be readily received in much of the Republic of Ireland.

== July 22, 1955 (Friday) ==
- The fourth Miss Universe pageant is held at the Long Beach Municipal Auditorium, California, US, and is won by Miss Sweden, 21-year-old Hillevi Rombin.
- The Medal of the 10th Anniversary of People's Poland is awarded for the last time (though the medal is not disestablished until 1992).
- Born: Willem Dafoe, American film actor, in Appleton, Wisconsin

== July 23, 1955 (Saturday) ==
- The Ffestiniog Railway in North Wales reopens as a Heritage railway.
- Died: Cordell Hull, 83, United States Secretary of State, recipient of the Nobel Peace Prize

== July 24, 1955 (Sunday) ==
- The First Ali Sastroamidjojo Cabinet of Indonesia is dissolved. Prime Minister Ali Sastroamidjojo remains in post until August.

== July 25, 1955 (Monday) ==
- The New York City Subway system begins using tokens.

== July 26, 1955 (Tuesday) ==
- 1955 Israeli legislative election: Elections for the third Knesset are held in Israel. Voter turnout is 82.8%. Mapai retained its plurality in the Knesset, although its share of the vote dropped by 5.1 and its share of seats dropped from 47 (at the end of the Second Knesset) to 40.

== July 27, 1955 (Wednesday) ==
- El Al Flight 402, a Lockheed Constellation flying from London to Tel Aviv via Vienna and Istanbul, strays into Bulgarian air space and is shot down by Bulgarian Air Force Mikoyan-Gurevich MiG-15 fighters. All 58 people aboard are killed.
- The Canadian National Railway opens a new branch between Hillsport, Ontario, and Manitouwadge, Ontario.
- Austrian State Treaty officially comes into force.

== July 28, 1955 (Thursday) ==
- The first Interlingua Congress in Tours, France, leading to foundation of the Union Mundial pro Interlingua.

== July 29, 1955 (Friday) ==
- Maltese passenger ship MV Star of Malta runs aground off St. Julian's and is wrecked, killing one crew member and a passenger.
- U.S. President Dwight D. Eisenhower endorses the International Geophysical Year (IGY) proposal for the launching of small earth-circling satellites.
- The United States announces that it will launch earth satellites during the 18-month IGY (July 1957 through December 1958).

== July 30, 1955 (Saturday) ==
- English poet Philip Larkin makes the train journey from Hull to Grantham which inspires his poem The Whitsun Weddings.

== July 31, 1955 (Sunday) ==
- 1955 Atlantic hurricane season: Tropical Storm Brenda develops in the north-central Gulf of Mexico at 0600 UTC.
- Died: Robert Francis, 25, US actor, killed when the small aircraft he is piloting bursts into flames as he attempts to land on a parking lot near Lockheed Air terminal
