= List of baronetcies in the Baronetage of the United Kingdom: N =

Peerages and baronetcies of Britain and Ireland
Extant	All
Dukes	Dukedoms
Marquesses	Marquessates
Earls	Earldoms
Viscounts	Viscountcies
Barons	Baronies
Baronets	Baronetcies
En, Ire, NS, GB, UK (extinct)

This is a list of baronetcies in the Baronetage of the United Kingdom. They have been created since 1801 when they replaced the baronetages in the Baronetage of Great Britain, and Baronetage of Ireland. This list is not currently complete.

Title	Date of creation	Surname	Current status	Notes
Nagle of Jamestown	1813	Nagle	extinct 1850	
Nairn of Rankeillour and Dysart House	1904	Nairn	extant	
Nairne of Kirkcudbright	1917	Nairne	extinct 1945	
Nall-Cain of The Node	1921	Nall-Cain	extant	first Baronet created Baron Brocket in 1933
Nall of Hoveringham Hall	1954	Nall	extant	
Napier of Merrion Square	1867	Napier	extant	
Naylor-Leyland of Hyde Park House	1895	Naylor-Leyland	extant	
Neal of Cherry Hinton	1931	Neal	extinct 1942	Lord Mayor of London
Neeld of Grittleton House	1859	Neeld	extinct 1941	
Nelson of Acton Park	1912	Nelson	dormant	third Baronet died in 1991
Nelson of Hilcote Hall	1955	Nelson	extant	first Baronet created Baron Nelson of Stafford in 1960
Nepean of Loders and Bothenhampton	1802	Nepean	extinct 2002	
Neville of Sloley	1927	Neville	extinct 1994	
Newman of Mamhead	1836	Mamhead	extant	fourth Baronet created Baron Mamhead in 1931, which title became extinct in 1945
Neumann, later Newman of Newmarket	1912	Neumann, Newman	extant	
Newnes of Wildcroft, Hollerday Hill and Hesketh House	1895	Newnes	extinct 1955	
Newson-Smith of Totteridge	1944	Newson-Smith	extant	Lord Mayor of London
Newson of Framlingham	1921	Newson	extinct 1950	
Newton of Beckenham	1924	Newton	extant	Lord Mayor of London
Newton of "The Wood" and Kottingham House	1900	Newton	extant	Lord Mayor of London
Nicholson of Kensington	1912	Nicholson	extant	
Nicholson of Luddenham	1859	Nicholson	extinct 1986	
Nicholson of Winterbourne Roy	1958	Nicholson	extinct 1958	
Nivison of Sanquhar	1914	Nivison	extant	first Baronet created Baron Glendyne in 1922
Nixon of Roebuck Grove and Merrion Square	1906	Nixon	extant	
Noble of Ardkinglass	1923	Noble	extant	
Noble of Ardmore	1902	Noble	extant	
Noble of West Denton Hall	1921	Noble	extinct 1935	first Baronet created Baron Kirkley in 1930
Norie-Miller of Cleeve	1936	Norie-Miller	extinct 1973	
Norman of Honeyhanger	1915	Norman	extant	
Northcote of Seamore Place	1887	Northcote	extinct 1911	first Baronet created Baron Northcote in 1900
Norton-Griffiths of Wonham	1922	Norton-Griffiths	extant	
Humble, later Nugent of Cloncoskoran	1831	Humble, Nugent	extinct 1929	
Nugent of Donore	1831	Nugent	extant	
Nugent of Dunsfold	1960	Nugent	dormant	first Baronet created a life peer as Baron Nugent of Guildford in 1966; first Baronet died 1994
Nugent of Portaferry	1961	Nugent	extinct 1962	
Nugent of Waddesdon	1806	Nugent	extant	
Nussey of Rushwood Hall	1909	Nussey	extinct 1971	
Nuttall of Chasefield	1922	Nuttall	extant	
Nutting of St Helens	1903	Nutting	extant	
