= List of presidents of the Institution of Electrical Engineers =

This is a list of presidents of the Institution of Electrical Engineers from its formation in 1871 until 2005, the date of amalgamation with the Institution of Incorporated Engineers to form the Institution of Engineering and Technology. Prior to 1889 the Institution was known as the Society of Telegraph Engineers and Electricians.

== List of presidents ==
Source: IET Archives

=== 1871–1899 ===
- 1872 Sir Charles William Siemens
- 1873 Frank Ives Scudamore
- 1874 Sir William Thomson (Baron Kelvin of Largs)
- 1875 Latimer Clark
- 1876 Charles Vincent Walker
- 1877 Sir Frederick Augustus Abel
- 1878 Sir Charles William Siemens (2nd term)
- 1879 Lieut Colonel Sir John Underwood Bateman-Champain
- 1880 Sir William Henry Preece
- 1881 George Carey Foster
- 1882 Major-General Charles Edmund Webber
- 1883 Willoughby Smith
- 1884 William Grylls Adams
- 1885 Charles Spagnoletti
- 1886 David Edward Hughes
- 1887 Sir Charles Tilston Bright
- 1888 Edward Graves
- 1889 Sir William Thomson (Baron Kelvin of Largs) (2nd term)
- 1890 John Hopkinson
- 1891 Sir William Crookes
- 1892 William Edward Ayrton
- 1893 Sir William Henry Preece (2nd term)
- 1894 Alexander Siemens
- 1895 Colonel Rookes Evelyn Bell Crompton
- 1896 John Hopkinson (2nd term)
- 1897 Sir Henry Christopher Mance
- 1898 Sir Joseph Wilson Swan
- 1899 Silvanus Phillips Thompson

=== 1900–1999 ===
- 1900 John Perry
- 1901 William Edward Langdon
- 1902 Sir James Swinburne
- 1903 Robert Kaye Gray
- 1904 Alexander Siemens (2nd term)
- 1905 Sir John Gavey
- 1906 Sir Richard Tetley Glazebrook
- 1907 Lord Kelvin (Sir William Thomson, (Baron Kelvin of Largs)) (3rd term)
- 1908 Colonel Rookes Evelyn Bell Crompton
- 1908 William Morris Mordey
- 1909 Gisbert Kapp
- 1910–11 Sebastian Ziani de Ferranti
- 1912–13 William Duddell
- 1914 Sir John Francis Cleverton Snell
- 1915–16 Charles Pratt Sparks
- 1917–18 Charles Henry Wordingham
- 1919 Roger Thomas Smith
- 1920 Llewelyn Birchall Atkinson
- 1921 John Somerville Highfield
- 1922 Frank Gill
- 1923 Alexander Russell
- 1924 William Bradley Woodhouse
- 1925 Richard Alexander Chattock
- 1926 William Henry Eccles
- 1927 Sir Archibald Page
- 1928 Lieut-Colonel Kenelm Edgcumbe
- 1929 Colonel Sir Thomas Fortune Purves
- 1930 Clifford Copland Paterson
- 1931 John Muir Donaldson
- 1932 Edgar Walford Marchant
- 1933 Philip Vassar Hunter
- 1934 William Mundell Thornton
- 1935 John Macfarlane Kennedy
- 1936 Henry Thomas Young
- 1937 Lieut-Colonel Sir A George Lee
- 1938 Sir Arthur P M Fleming
- 1939 Johnsone Wright
- 1940 James Robert Beard
- 1941 Sir Noel Ashbridge
- 1942 Professor Cecil Lewis Fortescue
- 1943 Colonel Sir Stanley Angwin
- 1944 Sir Harry Railing
- 1945 Dr Percy Dunsheath
- 1946 Sir Vincent Ziani de Ferranti
- 1947 Percy Good FCGI
- 1948 Graeme Haldane
- 1949 Professor Eric Bailleul Moullin
- 1950 Sir Archibald Gill
- 1951 Sir John Hacking
- 1952 Colonel Bruce Hamer Leeson
- 1953 Harold Bishop
- 1954 Josiah Eccles
- 1955 Sir George Nelson
- 1956 Sir William Gordon Radley
- 1957 Thomas Edward Goldup
- 1958 Sidney Edward Goodall
- 1959 Sir Willis Jackson
- 1960 Sir Hamish Maclaren
- 1961 George Sail Campbell Lucas
- 1962 Cecil Thomas Melling
- 1963 Sir Albert Mumford
- 1964 Olliver William Humphreys
- 1965 Leonard Drucquer
- 1966 John Ashworth Ratcliffe
- 1967 Sir Stanley Brown
- 1968 Professor John Millar Meek
- 1969 David Edmondson
- 1970 Henry George Nelson, Lord Nelson of Stafford
- 1971 Professor John Flavell Coales
- 1972 Sir Eric Eastwood
- 1973 Archibald George Milne
- 1974 James Henry Herbert Merriman
- 1975 Robert James Clayton
- 1976 Eric Stuart Booth
- 1977 John McIntyre Ferguson
- 1978 James Redmond
- 1979 Professor John Brown
- 1980 Air Marshal Sir Herbert Durkin
- 1981 Sir Francis Tombs
- 1982 John Banks
- 1983 Maldwyn Noel John
- 1985 Admiral Sir Lindsay Bryson
- 1986 Dr Geoffrey Thomas Shepherd
- 1987 Professor Eric Albert Ash
- 1988 Thomas Bryce McCrirrick
- 1989 James Cadzow Smith
- 1990 David Arthur Jones
- 1991 Brian William Manley
- 1992 Professor Peter John Lawrenson
- 1993 Alan Walter Rudge
- 1994 Professor Sir David Evan Naunton Davies
- 1995 John Parnaby
- 1996 Robert Hawley
- 1997 David Jefferies
- 1998 Dr John Michael Taylor
- 1999 Dr Malcolm William Kennedy

=== 2000–2005 ===
- 2000 Professor John Edwin Midwinter
- 2001 Professor Brian Mellitt
- 2002 Professor Michael John Howard Sterling
- 2003 Sir David Brown
- 2004 Professor John O'Reilly
- 2005 Sir John Chisholm (last president)

For presidents from 2005–present, see Presidents of the Institution of Engineering and Technology
