= Dynasphere =

Dynasphere may refer to:

- Dynasphere (vehicle), a monowheel vehicle designed by John Archibald Purves
- Dynasphere (wind turbine), a vertical-axis wind turbine designed by Michael Reynolds

== See also ==
- DYNAS
