= Sir John Smythe (soldier) =

English soldier, diplomat, and military writer

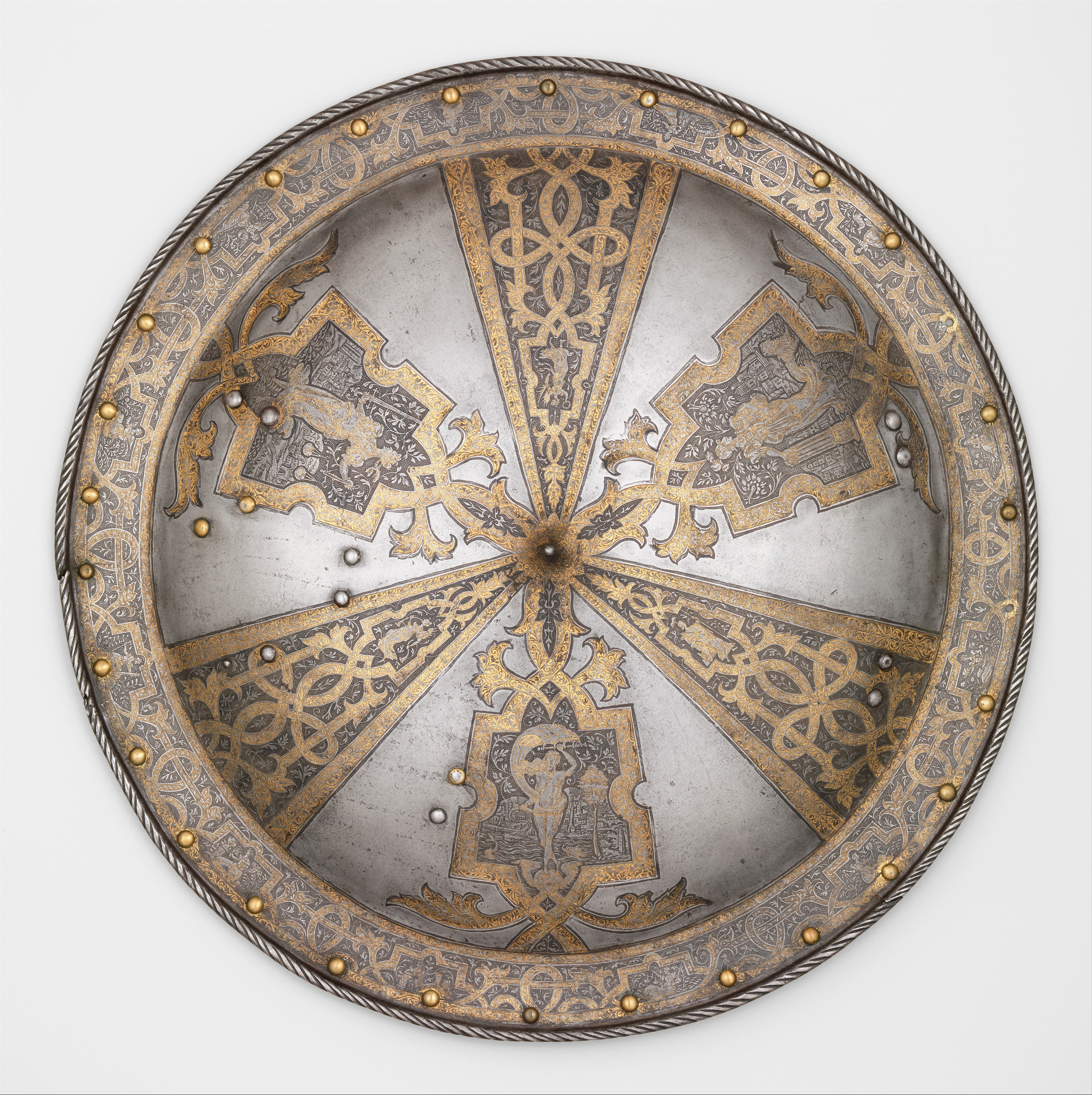
Ornate gilded shield made for Sir John Smythe, c. 1575–85. This elaborately decorated shield has gilt personifications of the virtues fortune, justice, and fortitude on the interior. Now held at the Metropolitan Museum of Art.

Sir John Smythe (c. 1532 – August 1607) was an English soldier, diplomat, and military writer.

== Early life and education, c. 1532–1572 ==
Smythe was born in Essex, around 1532, (Note: Artemis Gause, writing for the Oxford Dictionary of National Biography, claims his birth in 1533/4, based on his reported age at death of 73, in August 1607. John Rigby Hale, on the other hand, claims his birth in 1532(N.S.), citing an Inquisition post mortem dated 30 January 1553(N.S.), quoted in Morant's History and Antiquities of the County of Essex (1768), which claims his age as 21. He was 21 by 30 January 1553.) as the eldest son and heir of Sir Clement Smith (died 1552), a staunchly Catholic administrator of Rivenhall and Little Baddow in Essex, and his wife, Dorothy (née Seymour). Clement was ultimately descended from an Essex family of little importance, and was brought to prominence as an affinal relation of the Seymour family, specifically as the brother-in-law of queen consort Jane Seymour, though this advancement was impeded by his unwavering Catholicism in the face of the ongoing Reformation. This relation evidently gave John some status later in life, as Elizabeth I referred to him as "a gentleman of her family" on one occasion.

According to Anthony à Wood, Smythe attended Oxford, though Wood neglects to give Smythe's College or date of matriculation as "both his names are very common" in the university records. Smythe never took a degree at the university, but "laid the foundation of literature" during his education, as Wood puts it; in his later writings he is comfortable quoting classical authorities, such as the Greek historians Herodotus, Thucydides, and Diodorus Siculus, and the Roman authors Pliny the Elder and Plutarch, demonstrating some degree of conventional education. Smythe likely left this education after a short time, serving "armed in the field" against Kett's Rebellion and the Western Rising, both in 1549, while still a teenager.

== Independence and European military career, 1552–1576 ==
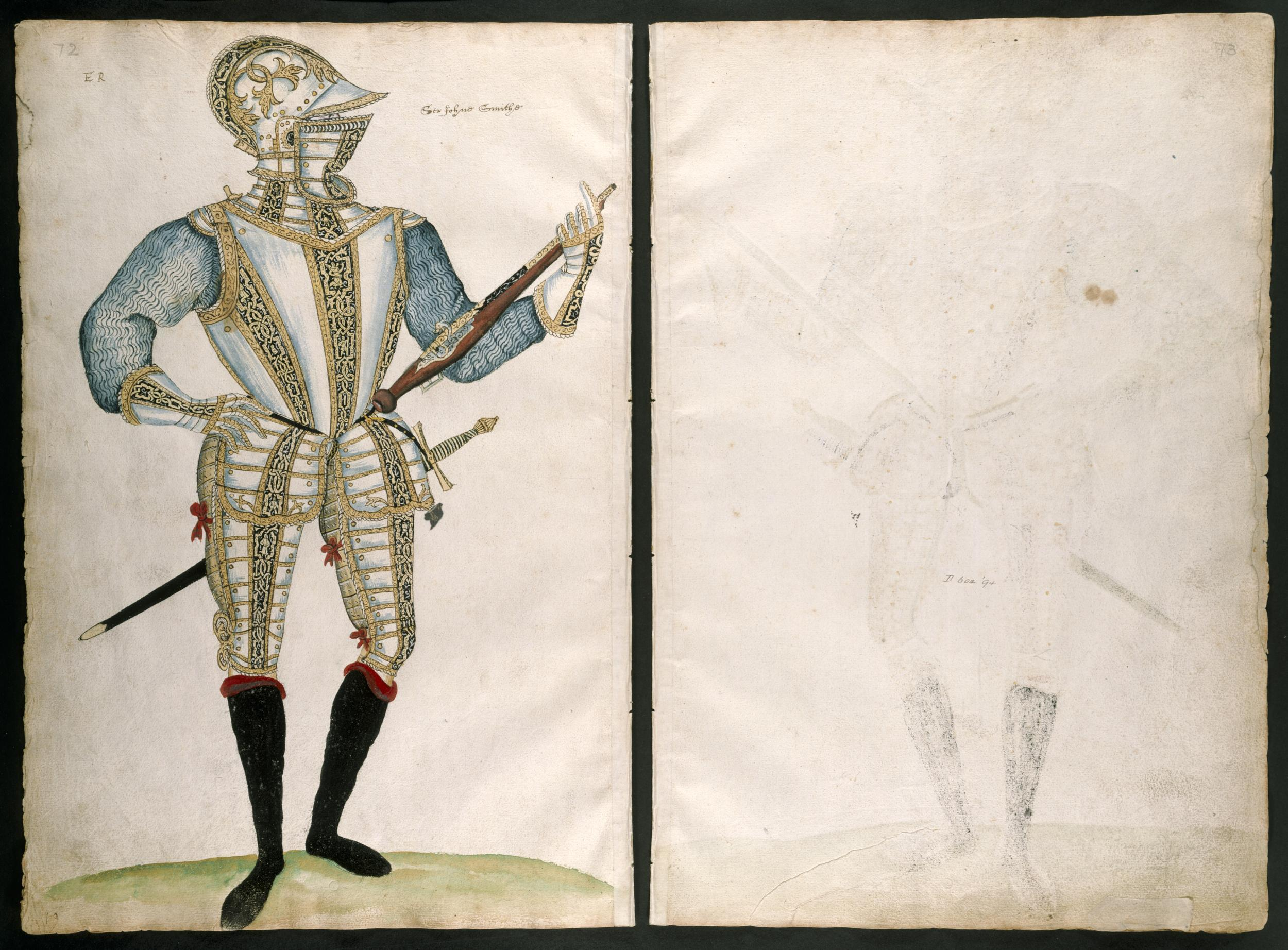
A suit of armour made for John Smith, in the Almain Armourer's Album (c. 1557–87)

Smythe's father died on 26 August 1552, and Smythe came into his inheritance as his father's heir. Almost immediately, Smythe began to sell off portions of this inheritance to fund his life as self-sufficient member of the English gentry. Sometime in the 1550s, Smythe set off from England in voluntary exile in order to gain military experience in the Continent. He volunteered in France, the Low Countries, and Hungary; in Hungary he fought in the ongoing Ottoman–Habsburg wars against the Turks in 1566, for which he caught the attention of the Holy Roman Emperor, Maximilian II. Smythe joined with a group of Protestant volunteers to fight alongside Philip II of Spain in the Mediterranean front of these wars.

Smythe returned to England in 1572, where he was greeted with a grant of the manor of Little Baddow and the advowson of the parish church. This service had apparently been effective in developing him into "as well a compleat soldier as [a] gentleman", according to Wood; he was "well versed in a variety of military techniques and practices" by the end of his service, Artemis Gause, writing for the Oxford Dictionary of National Biography, claims, as the experience "shaped his firm opinions ... that became the trademark of his written works." Additionally, Smythe's association with a group of English and Welsh military gentlemen, assembled in opposition to the European Counter-Reformation, indicates that he had rejected his father's Catholicism during this military service. Gause writes that Smythe likely embraced Protestantism, "albeit cautiously", and "was certainly anti-clerical" by this point.

== Spanish ambassador, 1576–1577 ==
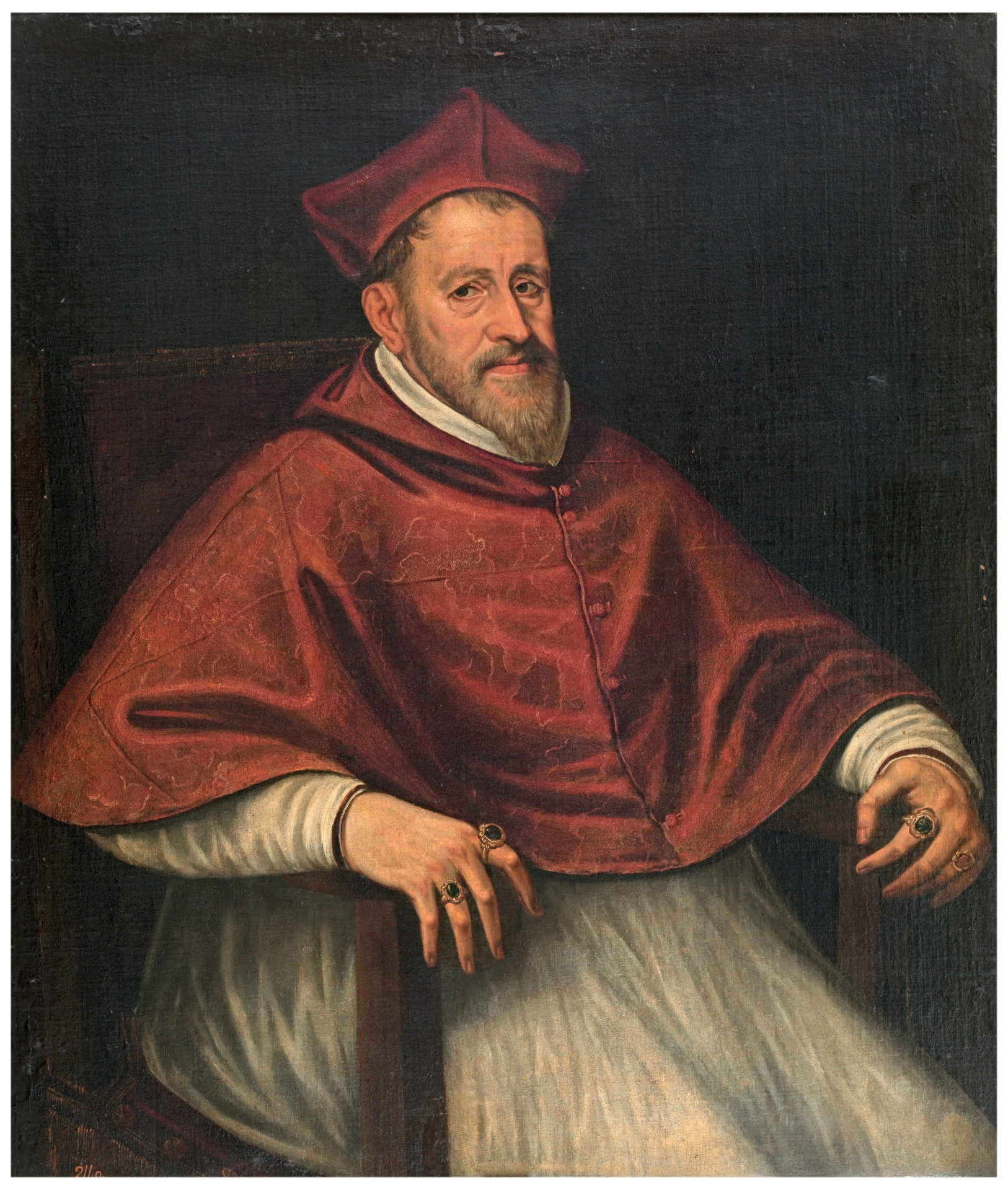
El cardenal Gaspar Quiroga (1580) by Tintoretto; Smythe's tenure as Spanish ambassador was marked by his hostile relations with the General Inquisitor, Gaspar de Quiroga, culminating in a violent outburst of Smythe in Quiroga's residence.

Smythe was appointed Elizabeth I's special ambassador to Spain on 18 November 1576. Having served under Philip II, Smythe was familiar with Spanish customs and military tactics, fluent in Spanish, and was already well liked within the Spanish court. Smythe likely obtained the position because of these skills, and valuable the political backing of his cousin, Edward Seymour, 1st Earl of Hertford. This position afforded Smythe many privileges. As a result of this selection, he was knighted in 1576, and, on his voyage to Spain, took the opportunity to visit Henry III of France. He was paid £2 10s a day, approximately £600 in modern GBP. (Note: "Currency converter: 1270–2017". The National Archives. Converting £2 10s from 1570–2017 using this converter produces £595.57.)

Smythe was appointed at a critical time for Anglo-Spanish relations, during which he was to "make her Majestie privy to the whole state of Spayne", as he explained in a letter to William Cecil. With the English-backed Dutch Revolt in 1576, and a large Spanish force in the Low Countries poised to attack, Smythe was to pose himself as a mediator of relations between the two nations. Elizabeth saw Smythe's arbitration as an opportunity to maintain temporarily favourable relations with Spain, preventing war for the time being. Smythe was also tasked with protecting English merchants within Spain, and freeing English Protestants victimised by the Spanish Inquisition.

Smythe was granted his first audience with Philip II on 24 January 1577. According to Gause, Smythe "carried out his duties well in tense and difficult circumstances" during his incumbency; he succeeded in persuading Philip to maintain peace with Elizabeth, but was actively counterproductive in protecting her subjects from the Inquisition. He clashed with the General Inquisitor, Gaspar de Quiroga, over the topic in Quiroga's residence, degenerating into an exchange of insults between the two men. Even as Philip approved Smythe's peace, Quiroga denounced Elizabeth as a heretic and, afterwards, obstinately refused to grant Smythe an audience with the king. With his many requests for an audience unreceived, Smythe grew aggravated at Quiroga's obduracy. He forced his way into Quiroga's house to demand his audience be granted, addressing him patronizingly as "sirrah". (Note: In Early Modern English, "sirrah" was a term of address reserved for children or those of lower status than the speaker.) The meeting terminated when a "violent altercation which nearly ended in blows" broke out, not halting until Smythe was dragged away by friends. Quiroga remained implacable, with the Secretary of State, Gabriel de Zayas, reminding Smythe shortly after the clash that "the tribunal of the Holy Inquisition is simply and purely ecclesiastical ... the King ... does not interfere in any way with it or its proceedings ... You will thus see easily what it will be proper to ask of his Catholic Majesty and what he is able to concede."

Shortly after this incident, Smythe was no longer required to fill this office, as Don John of Austria had unexpectedly come to an agreement with Philip, without the need for Smythe's arbitration. Before his departure to England, Smythe was granted one last audience with the king on 29 March 1577. Wishing to trust he had disposed of his duties "dutifully and dilligently", Philip gave Smythe assurance that English subjects "shall not be molested or interfered with". Of the English inmates Smythe had intervened on the behalf of, at least four were released thanks to his intervention. Smythe was recalled to England on 28 July 1577.

== Return to England, 1577–1585 ==
From Smythe's return to England until 1585, Smythe lived a fairly uneventful country gentleman's life. He was afforded more modest means than previously used to, and was often fined for neglecting the maintenance of his property. A minor and spurious rumour of a child out of wedlock was the only notable occurrence of this period.

== Political rebound, 1585–1588 ==
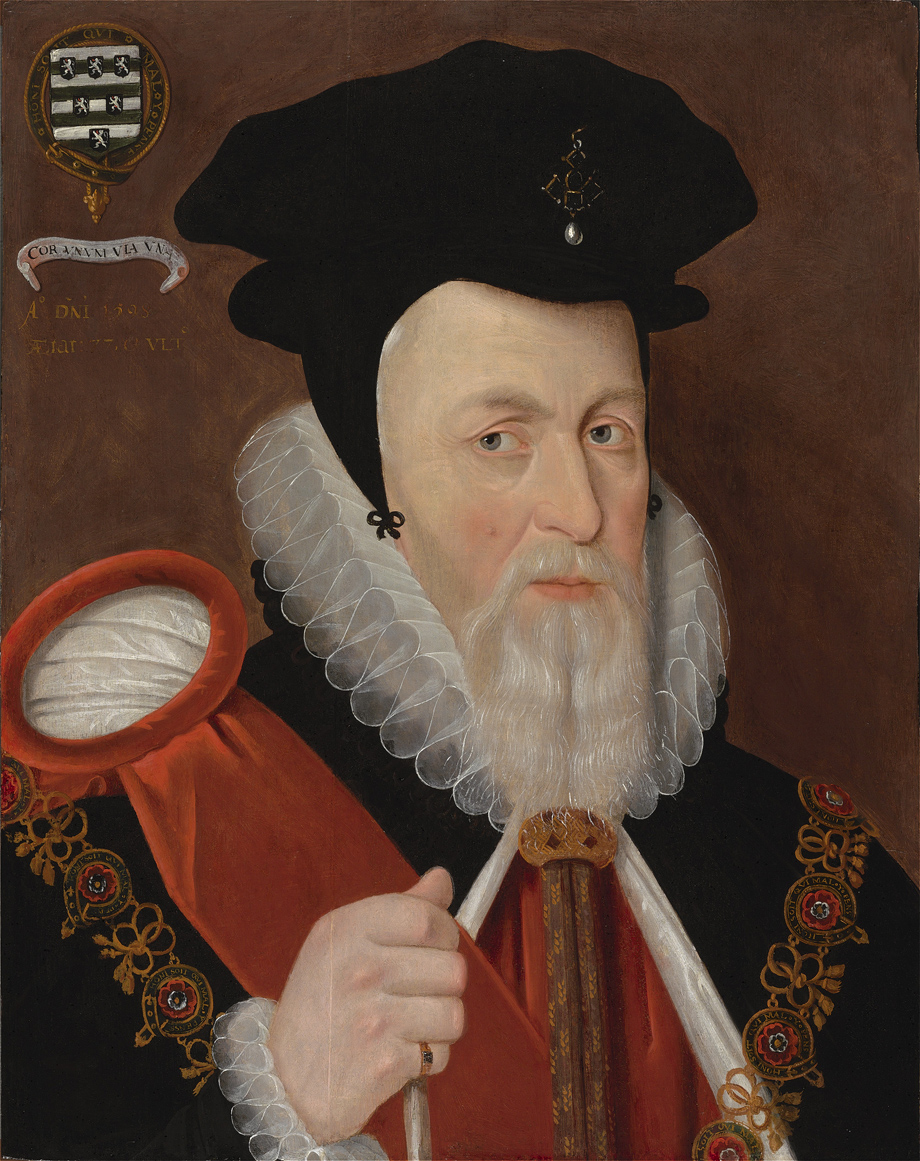
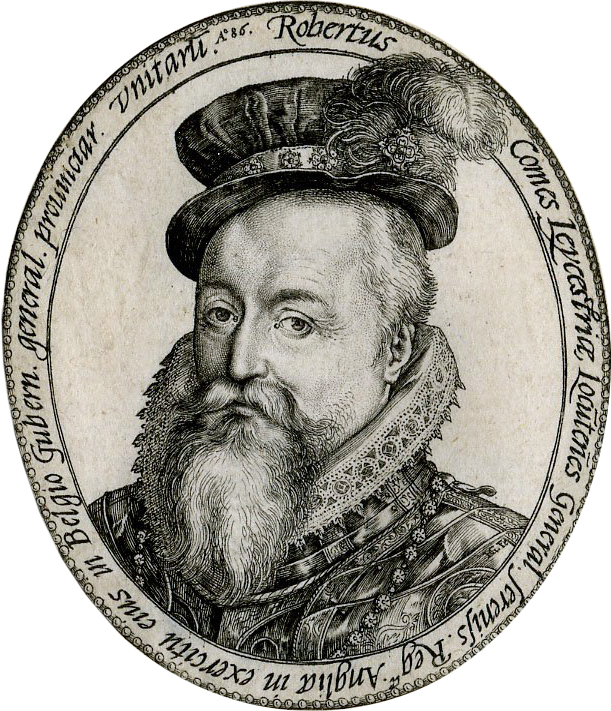
William Cecil, Lord Burghley (left, late 1580s) and Robert Dudley, 1st Earl of Leicester (right, 1587) were the two most prominent representatives of the militant and peaceful factions of the English court in the wake of the Anglo-Spanish War.

In 1585, the eruption of the Anglo-Spanish War over the Dutch Revolt, and fear of a Spanish invasion of England, led to a division in the English court. On the one side, the militant faction (led by Robert Dudley, 1st Earl of Leicester) argued for a direct military offensive in the Low Countries to prevent such a contingency, while, on the other side, the peaceful faction (led by William Cecil, Lord Burghley) contended war would be an expensive and risky resort, instead proposing diplomatic efforts to restore peace. At this time, Smythe was appointed Elizabeth's ambassador to Spanish military leader, Alexander Farnese, Duke of Parma. This was an unfortunate appointment for Smythe, as this office put him in the pro-peace camp, marking him as a political target for the militants. The embassy was cancelled soon after Smythe's summoning.

Smythe returned to English politics following this frustrated appointment, distinguishing himself as a vocal critic of those who, he thought, frittered away valuable English soldiers in wasteful foreign wars. He also criticised the then-common use of impressment by the English navy as a socially disruptive practice, an opinion which was unpopular among the court and detrimental to his reputation. It is possible he even publicly marked himself as a member of the pro-peace faction, having previously been a friend and ally of Cecil. In 1587, Smythe was enlisted to train 2000 English soldiers in Essex, where his personal reports indicated he was effective. However, the following year, the pro-war Dudley saw to his dismissal from this position. According to Dudley's accounts, Smythe's training was a failure, and Smythe was generally regarded among the men as an eccentric and hypochondriac; Dudley claimed Smythe simply "was not well", citing the "straunge cryes" he apparently produced when marshalling his troops. Smythe's political position was greatly reduced following this controversy.

== Military writer, 1590–95 ==
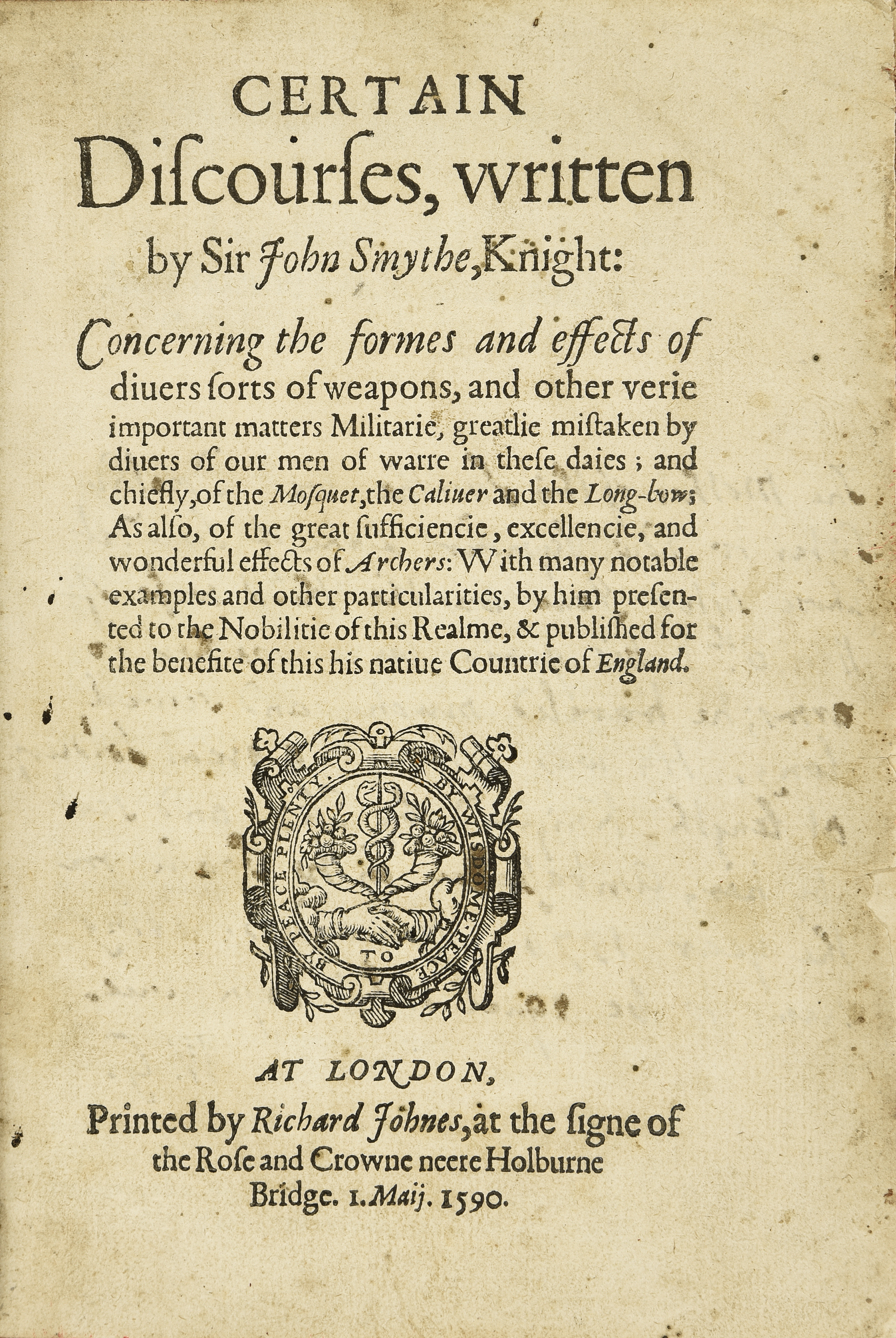
John Smythe's Certain Discourses (1590).

Politically marginalised again, Smythe set about on another venture: military writing. He had probably already composed the work by 1586, but in May 1590, Smythe published Certain Discourses, a pamphlet on military strategy.

This book did not meet with sympathetic responses from the Queen's court. Shortly after publication, being informed of its content, Cecil had the book suppressed on 14 May 1590. Smythe was outraged by this suppression, and sent forth several letters appealing to Cecil. In some of these letters, Smythe gives a glimpse into his ongoing external strife, griping that he was forced to pawn his inheritance to pay off mounting debts, and found himself marginalised within Elizabethan politics after Dudley's death in 1588. He suspected prejudice or conspiracy against himself in court; "I have great cause to doubt and feare", he wrote, "that the condemninge doth procede, rather uppon some great mislikinge had of me, beeing the autour of the booke, then of the booke yt self". Ultimately, Smythe prepared a corrected edition of the book, but Cecil was not appeased; the book didn't again appear in print until a 1964 edition was published for the Folger Shakespeare Library, corrected with additions from Smythe's original manuscript.

Despite its brief print run, the Certain Discourses has come to be understood as the "most original and controversial of the Tudor military books" according to J. R. Hale, in the preface to the Folger edition.

== Imprisonment and death, 1596–1607 ==
Smythe's social position not improved by these enterprises, by spring 1596, he was forced to sell the estate of Little Baddow. On 12 June that year, Smythe visited the house of his friend, Thomas Lucas, in Colchester. According to his later account of the following events, during a meal with Lucas and Smythe's wife, Smythe began "drinckinge of wyne, and wyne upon wyne" to comfort a stomach pain, entering a drunken state. Such inebriation apparently deviated from Smythe's "custome of diet of many years ... well known to many", as he put in a later letter; indeed, Smythe had earlier criticised the vice among soldiers, lamenting those who ended up "dead drunk, or, as the Flemings say, doot dronken". In "such a heat", Smythe rode out to a field where "some fower score or a hundreth" of Lucas' men were training with his hated firearms, and began to deliver "franticke, disordered speeches" reprimanding them for wasting their lives in foreign wars. He ranted against the use of impressment, making reference to a previous conversation with jurist Roger Manwood, in which he had been assured of the practice's dubious legality. He entreated them to forsake any summons to foreign war given by Cecil, whom he called treasonous, instead calling on them to follow his nephew, Thomas Seymour, away from these wars.

According to Gause, Smythe likely "touched a raw nerve" among the soldiers with these speeches, with the ongoing foreign wars of England, and the suspicion that their local militia would be conscripted into such service; Smythe's own followers probably encouraged him and one man shouted "God Save the Queen" at the conclusion of Smythe's speech. This support, however, was short-lived: at his height of the fervour, fewer than 50 men stood behind Smythe, and they soon after dissociated themselves from Smythe after their fellow soldiers questioned whether they wanted to be hanged. It was clear Smythe wasn't mustering the support he had hoped, and soon after Cecil sent out a warrant for Smythe's arrest, to which Lucas complied.

Cecil argued "that the said attempte proceeded not of his meere rashenes ... or sodaine overthrowe of his owne, but from some farther grounde and foundacion of practize and conspiracie", ordering a search of his house. This revealed stockpiles of weapons, alongside libels against Cecil, which were interpreted as evidence of a conspiracy. The court sentenced Smythe to imprisonment in the Tower of London. During his imprisonment, Smythe sent many letters to Cecil, which, according to Gause, "capture the essence of his personality" in their absurd range. He pleaded for his release, claiming repentance for past sins, threatened "lawfullie advis[ing] the people not to goe in service out of the realme at this tyme", and tactlessly reminded Cecil of his previous service to the realm. As the imprisonment dragged on, Smythe became less assertive in his appeals. He cited his "olde yeares and unhealthfulnes" grating at his imprisonment, to which Cecil showed some clemency, allowing visits from his wife, (Note: Information on Smythe's wife – including her name, background, dates of birth, death, and marriage – are entirely absent beyond tangential references like this.) his attorney (Matthew Rudd), Lady Susan Bourchier, and Richard Bristow, regular walks in the tower garden, and visits from a physician to ease these ailments. Smythe was released from the Tower on the queen's orders on 3 February 1598. His punishment was now relaxed to house arrest in a newly purchased Little Baddow residence, and the 1-mile radius area around it, conditional on a public apology which was to be posted around Colchester.

After his success with these appeals, Smythe retreated from public life. His name is absent from records until 4 March 1600, when Cecil's son, Robert, 1st Earl of Salisbury, cordially requested documents on the Inquisition from his tenure as embassador. Smythe was unable to help, but neither party showed any malice over the earlier events. A couple weeks later, Smythe's punishment was again commuted to a 5-mile radius around his house. On the petition of his relative Reginald Smythe, Smythe visited London for 12 days to take care of any unresolved business. Smythe spent the last 7 years of his life residing at Little Baddow, drawing little attention to himself, and died at the end of August 1607. He was buried on the first of the following month in the village church.

== Sources ==
- Alsop, J. D. (3 January 2008). "Smith, Sir Clement (d. 1552)". Oxford Dictionary of National Biography (online ed.). Oxford University Press. doi:10.1093/ref:odnb/40614. (Subscription, Wikipedia Library access or UK public library membership required.)
- Coros, D. F. (1982). "Smith, Clement (by 1515-52), of Little Baddow and Rivenhall, Essex". In Bindoff, S. T. (ed.). The History of Parliament: the House of Commons 1509-1558. Archived from the original on 22 December 2024 – via History of Parliament Online.
- Davies, Jonathan (Spring 2002). "'A Combersome Tying Weapon in a Throng Of Men': The Decline of the Longbow in Elizabethan England". Journal of the Society for Army Historical Research. 80 (321): 16–31. JSTOR 44230774.
- Esper, Thomas (Summer 1965). "The Replacement of the Longbow by Firearms in the English Army". Technology and Culture. 6 (3): 382–393. doi:10.2307/3101785. JSTOR 3101785.
- Fissel, Mark Charles (2001). English Warfare, 1511-1642. London & New York: Routledge. ISBN 978-0-415-21482-7.
- Gause, Artemis (3 January 2008). "Smythe [Smith], Sir John (1533/4–1607)". Oxford Dictionary of National Biography (online ed.). Oxford University Press. doi:10.1093/ref:odnb/25832. (Subscription, Wikipedia Library access or UK public library membership required.)
- Morant, Philip (1768). The History and Antiquities of the County Of Essex: Compiled from the Best and Most Ancient Historians, From Domesday-Book, Inquisitions Post Mortem and Other the Most Valuable Records and MSS. &C, the Whole Digested, Improved, Perfected and Brought Down to the Present Time. Vol. 2. London: Printed for T. Osborne, J. Whiston, S. Baker, L. Davis, C. Reymers, and B. White. p. 136. OCLC 1511622200. "Inquis, 7 Ed. VI. Jan. 30."
- Smythe, John (1964). Hale, J. R. (ed.). Certain Discourses Military. Folger Documents of Tudor and Stuart Civilization. Ithaca, N.Y.: Published for the Folger Shakespeare Library by Cornell University Press. OCLC 569433138.

- Hale, J. R. (1964). "Introduction". In Hale, J. R. (ed.). Certain Discourses Military. pp. xiii–xcv.

- Spaulding, Thomas M. (1937). "A Manuscript of Sir John Smythe's "Certain Discourses"". The Papers of the Bibliographical Society of America. 31 (2): 180–184. doi:10.1086/pbsa.31.2.24296540. JSTOR 24296540. S2CID 193041939.
- Wood, Anthony à (1813) [1691]. "John Smythe". In Bliss, Philip (ed.). Athenæ Oxonienses. Vol. 1. London. pp. 649–651.
