= Clement Smith (administrator) =

Member of the Parliament of England

The Honourable Clement Smith Kt
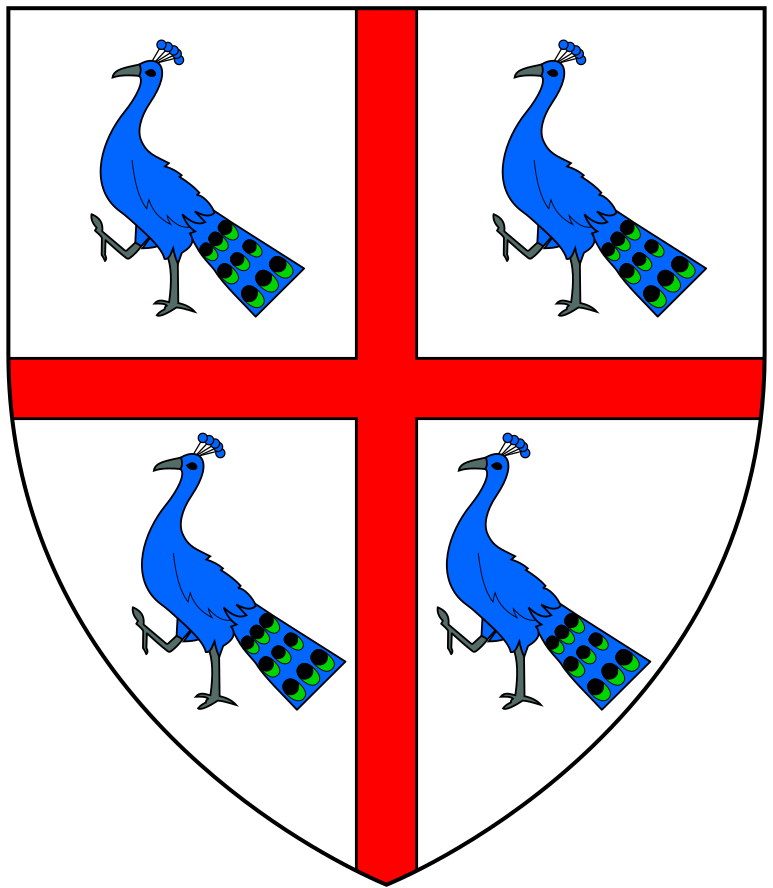
- Arms of Smith of Great Baddow: Argent, a cross gules between three peacocks azure

Member of Parliament for Maldon
- In office 1545–1547
- In office 1547–1552

Personal details
- Born: c. 1515
- Died: 26 August 1552 (aged 36–37) Little Baddow, Essex
- Spouse: Dorothy Seymour
- Children: Sir John Smythe; Bennet Smith; Clement Smith; Dorothy Smith, and others ...
- Parents: Thomas Smith; Isabel Foster

Sir Clement Smith (c. 1515 – 26 August 1552), son of Thomas Smith of Rivenhall, Essex, and Isabel, daughter of William Foster of Little Baddow, Essex, served as an administrator in the reign of Henry VIII and Edward VI. He was Lord Treasurer's Remembrancer in the Exchequer (often erroneously called "Chief Baron of the Exchequer"), and was twice MP for Maldon in Essex, in 1545 and 1547. He was knighted by Edward VI on 22 February 1547.

He married Dorothy (d. 4 January 1574), youngest daughter of Sir John Seymour (d. 1536) of Wulfhall in Wiltshire, sister of Queen Jane Seymour (d. 1537), third wife of King Henry VIII. The couple had three sons and four daughters, including:

- Sir John Smythe (1533/4–1607), diplomat and military writer.
- Bennet Smith
- Clement Smith
- Dorothy Smith, married Edmund Parker (d. 1635) of North Molton in Devon. The Smith arms are visible carved in relief on an oak screen dated 1609 in North Molton Church, impaled by Parker. Notable descendants of this marriage were Baron Boringdon, later created Earl of Morley (Parker) also Admiral Hyde Parker.
Parker impaling Argent, a cross gules between three peacocks azure (Smith of Little Baddow), oak screen, North Molton

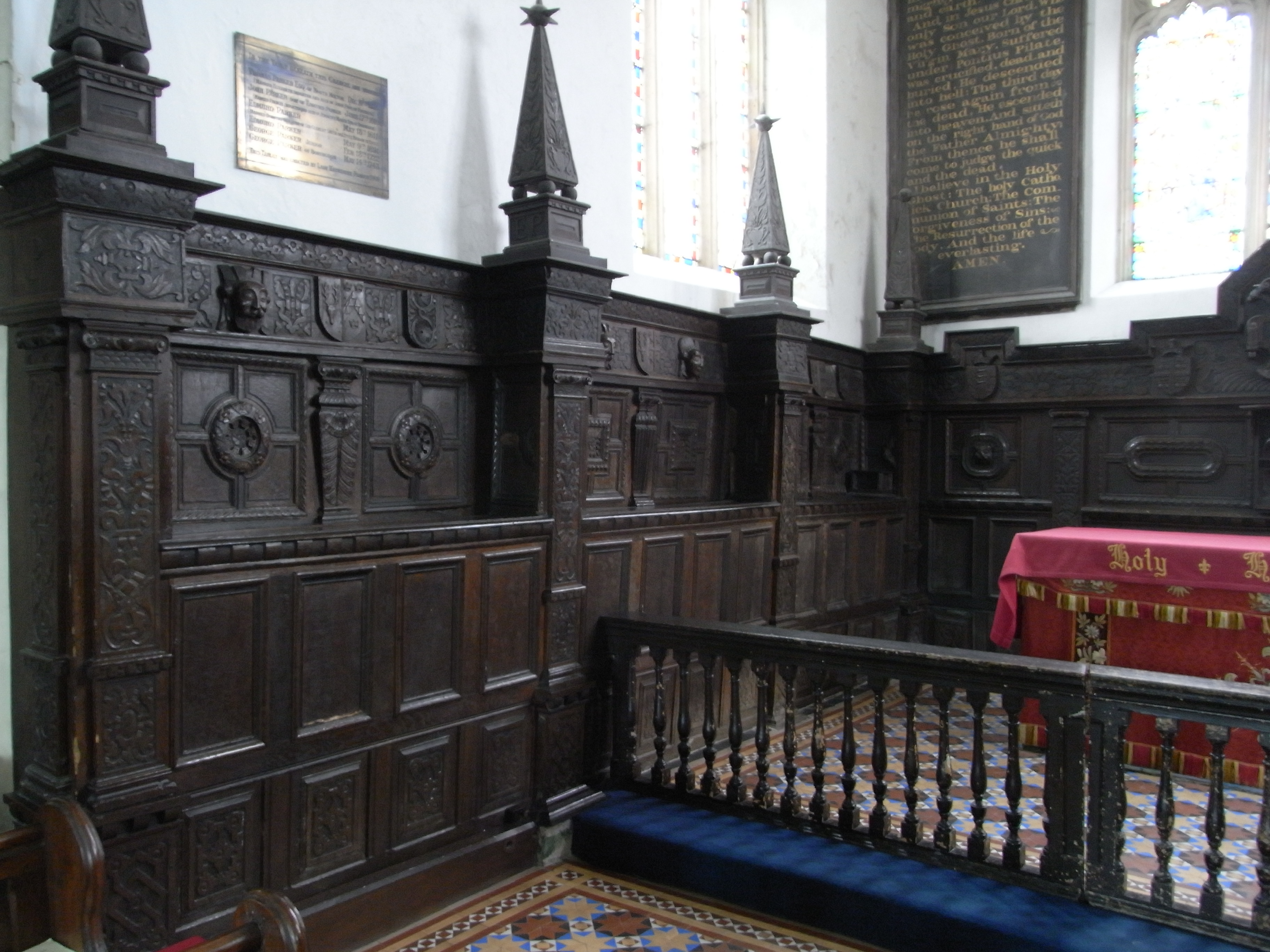
Oak panelling with sculpted heraldry of Parker family of North Molton

Smith made his will on 13 July 1551, with a codicil of 10 August 1552. He died at Little Baddow on 26 August 1552. His widow subsequently married, before November 1553, Thomas Leventhorpe (d. 8 June 1588) of Shingle Hall, Hertfordshire. She died 4 January 1574.
