= John Snell (electrical engineer) =

English electrical engineer and administrator (1859–1938)

Sir John Snell GBE FIEE FICE
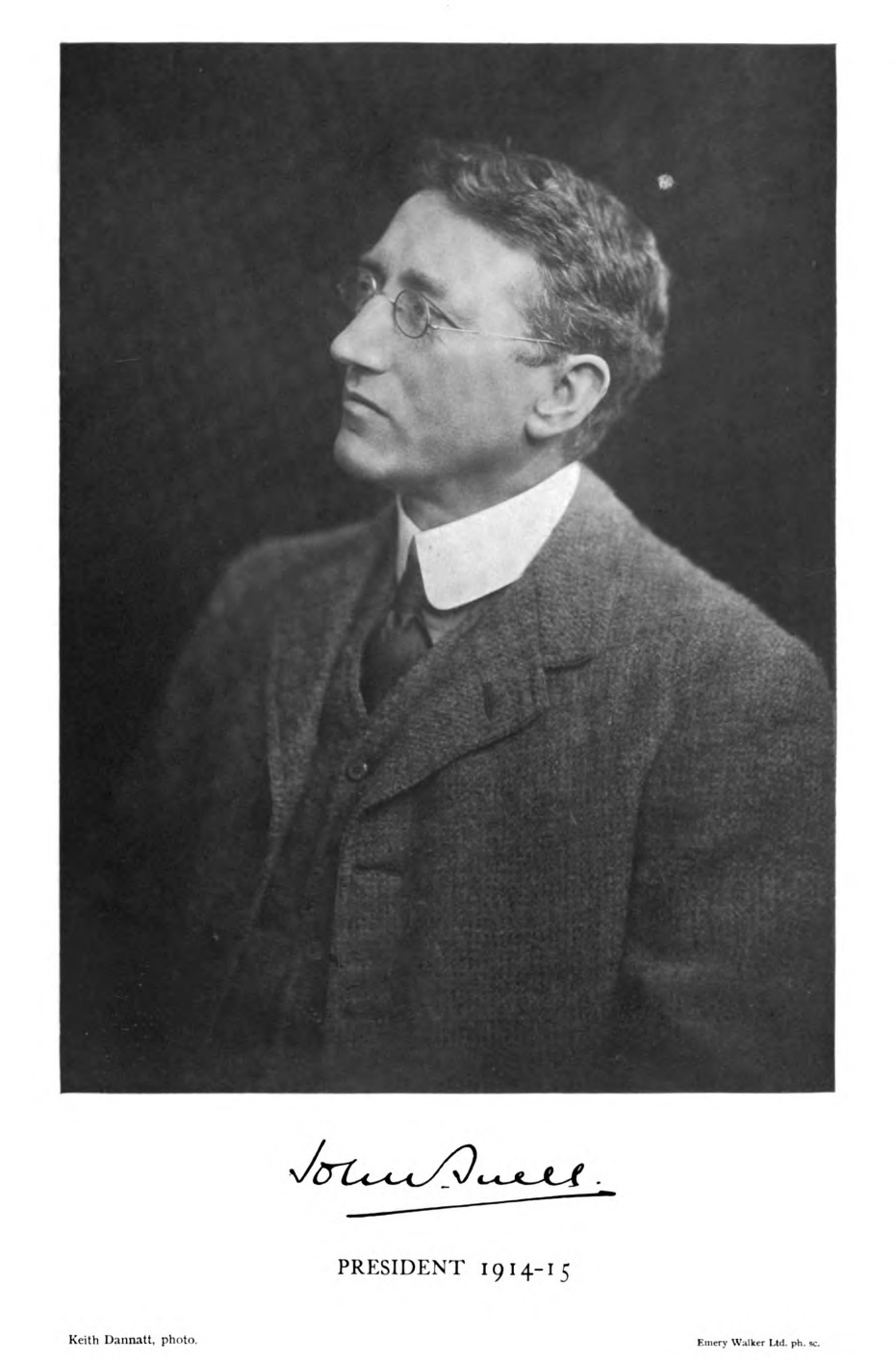
- c. 1914

Chairman, Electricity Commission
- In office 1919–1938

Personal details
- Born: John Francis Cleverton Snell; 15 December 1859 Saltash, Cornwall, England
- Died: 6 July 1938 (aged 78)

Sir John Francis Cleverton Snell (15 December 1859 – 6 July 1938) was a British electrical engineer and administrator.

== Life ==
Snell was born in Saltash, Cornwall, the only son of Commander John Skinner Snell, RN and his wife Harriet Cleverton and educated at Plymouth Grammar School, Finsbury Technical College, and King's College, London.

After working for four years from 1885 with Messrs. Woodhouse and Rawson he was appointed in 1889 a resident engineer at Messrs. Crompton and Co., where he worked on electrical supply projects in London and Stockholm. From 1892 he worked as assistant to General Charles Edmund Webber on electrical supply projects in Kensington and a number of country houses, before entering municipal service in London in 1893 as assistant electrical engineer in St Pancras during the construction of the Kings Road power station. In 1896 he transferred to Sunderland as Borough Electrical Engineer, additionally becoming Borough Tramways Engineer in 1896 after which he converted the tramway system to electric power.

In 1906, he set up in business as a consulting engineer in Westminster, amalgamating with Preece and Cardew to form Preece, Cardew and Snell. During that time he served as an expert witness for the General Post Office in a case involving compensation payments to National Telephone Company, after which he was given a knighthood (in 1914). He also acted as President of the Institute of Electrical Engineers for 1914.

During the First World War he served on a number of committees, including the Munitions Inventions Committee. After the war he left the consulting company (by then Preece, Cardew, Snell and Rider) to advise the government of matters of electrical supply. He helped to set up the Electricity Commission and served as its first chairman from 1919 to 1938, during which time the Central Electricity Board was established, the national grid created and the supply of electricity standardised. He was appointed a Knight Grand Cross of the Order of the British Empire (GBE) in the 1925 Birthday Honours.

In 1928 he began introducing major new electricity power systems in the West of England with his friend and then colleague, Dr John A. Purves.

He was awarded the Faraday Medal for 1938 by the Institution of Electrical Engineers (now the Institution of Engineering and Technology).

He died after an operation at the London Clinic in 1938. He had married Annie Glendenning Quick of Biscovey, Cornwall, with whom he had at least one son.
