= George Nelson, 1st Baron Nelson of Stafford =

The Right Honourable The Lord Nelson of Stafford
- By Walter Stoneman, 1947
- Born: George Horatio Nelson; 26 October 1887; London, United Kingdom
- Died: 16 July 1962 (aged 74); Stafford, United Kingdom
- Occupations: Electrical engineer; Chairman of English Electric

George Horatio Nelson, 1st Baron Nelson of Stafford (26 October 1887 – 16 July 1962), known as Sir George Nelson, 1st Baronet, from 1955 to 1960, was a British engineer who was chairman of English Electric from 1933 to 1962. Over nearly thirty years as its chairman George Nelson built up the number of English Electric's employees from 4,000 to 80,000.

== Early life, education and family ==
Nelson was born in Islington, London, the son of George Nelson, a member of a Leicestershire family of textile merchants. Educated at the City and Guilds Central Technical College in London he obtained a studentship at Brush Electrical Engineering in Loughborough for practical experience on the shop floor and in the drawing office.

Nelson married Florence Mabel, daughter of Henry Howe, in 1913. They had a daughter and a son. He died in July 1962 and Lady Nelson died the same year. He was succeeded in the barony by his only son, Henry George, who had followed him in 1956 as managing director and, after his death in 1962, as chairman of English Electric.

== Career ==
=== Early career and English Electric ===
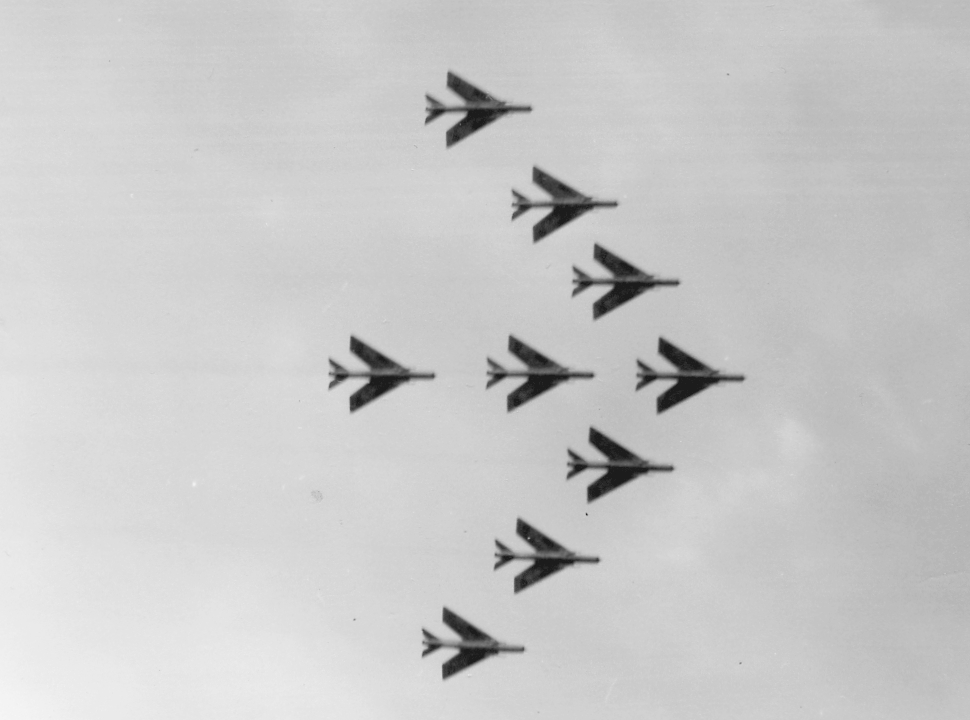
English Electric Lightnings at Farnborough Airshow, 1961

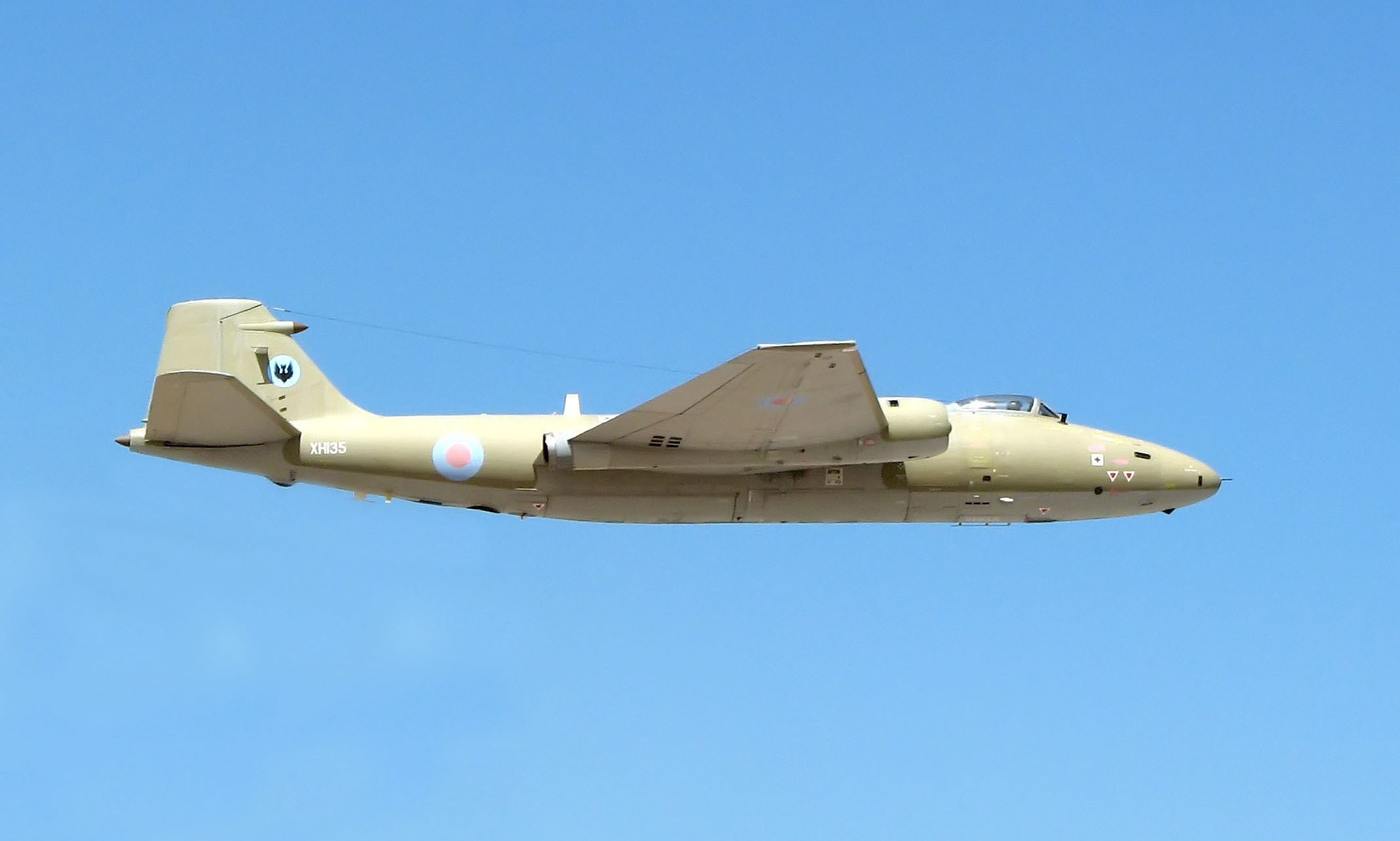
English Electric Canberra, designed in the closing stages of World War II

He joined British Westinghouse in Manchester and rapidly progressed, being appointed chief electrical superintendent in 1914 aged 27. Westinghouse became Metropolitan Vickers Electrical and in 1920 Nelson was appointed manager of their Sheffield works, which specialised in electric traction.

In 1930, he was appointed managing director of English Electric at the invitation of Sir Holberry Mensforth, with whom he worked at Westinghouse and who was now chairman of the financially troubled manufacturing firm, brought in during a period of reconstruction. Mensforth retired in 1933 and Nelson succeed him as chairman while retaining his position of managing director.

He remained at the company for the duration of his career and he died at their Stafford premises on 16 July 1962. During his tenure the number of employees rose from 4,000 to 80,000 with a more than proportionate increase in turnover.

=== Public activities ===
During World War II, Nelson held a number of positions:

- As chairman of the British Tank Mission he hammered out a joint policy for tank development and production with American industry and the US Army and Canada
- Served on the Heavy Bomber Group Committee of the Air Ministry, 1939–1945
- The Reconstruction Joint Advisory Council, 1943–1944
- The Higher Technological Education Committee, 1944–1945
- Chairman of the Census of Production Committee, 1945
- President of the Federation of British Industries, 1943–1944

Following the war, Nelson took an interest in the improvement of technical education and became a member of the governing bodies of Imperial College of Science and Technology, Manchester College of Science and Technology and Queen Mary College in the University of London.

He also served as President of the Institution of Electrical Engineers (1955), President of the Institution of Mechanical Engineers (1957), President of the British Electrical and Allied Manufacturers Association (1950–1953), President of the Locomotive and Allied Manufacturers Association (1950–1953), and Prime Warden of the Goldsmiths' Company (1960).

== Honours ==
In the 1943 New Year Honours he was knighted for services to the Ministry of Aircraft Production and Ministry of Supply. He was created a baronet, of Hilcote Hall in the County of Stafford, in 1955, before being raised to the peerage on 20 January 1960 as Baron Nelson of Stafford, of Hilcote Hall in the County of Stafford.

Imperial College made him an honorary fellow in 1955 and granted him an honorary diploma, Manchester University gave him an honorary LLD in 1957 and he was given the freedom of the city of Stafford 1956.

The Stafford Site Library of Staffordshire University was named after him in honour of his contribution to the engineering industry.

Professional and academic associations
Preceded by Josiah Eccles	President of the Institution of Electrical Engineers; 1955	Succeeded by Sir William Gordon Radley
Preceded by Thomas Arkle Crowe	President of the Institution of Mechanical Engineers; 1957	Succeeded by Sir Robert Owen Jones
Peerage of the United Kingdom
New creation	Baron Nelson of Stafford; 1960–1962	Succeeded by Henry George Nelson
Baronetage of the United Kingdom
New creation	Baronet (of Hilcote Hall); 1955–1962	Succeeded by Henry George Nelson
