= Hamlagrøvatnet =

Lake in Norway

- Hamlagrøvatn
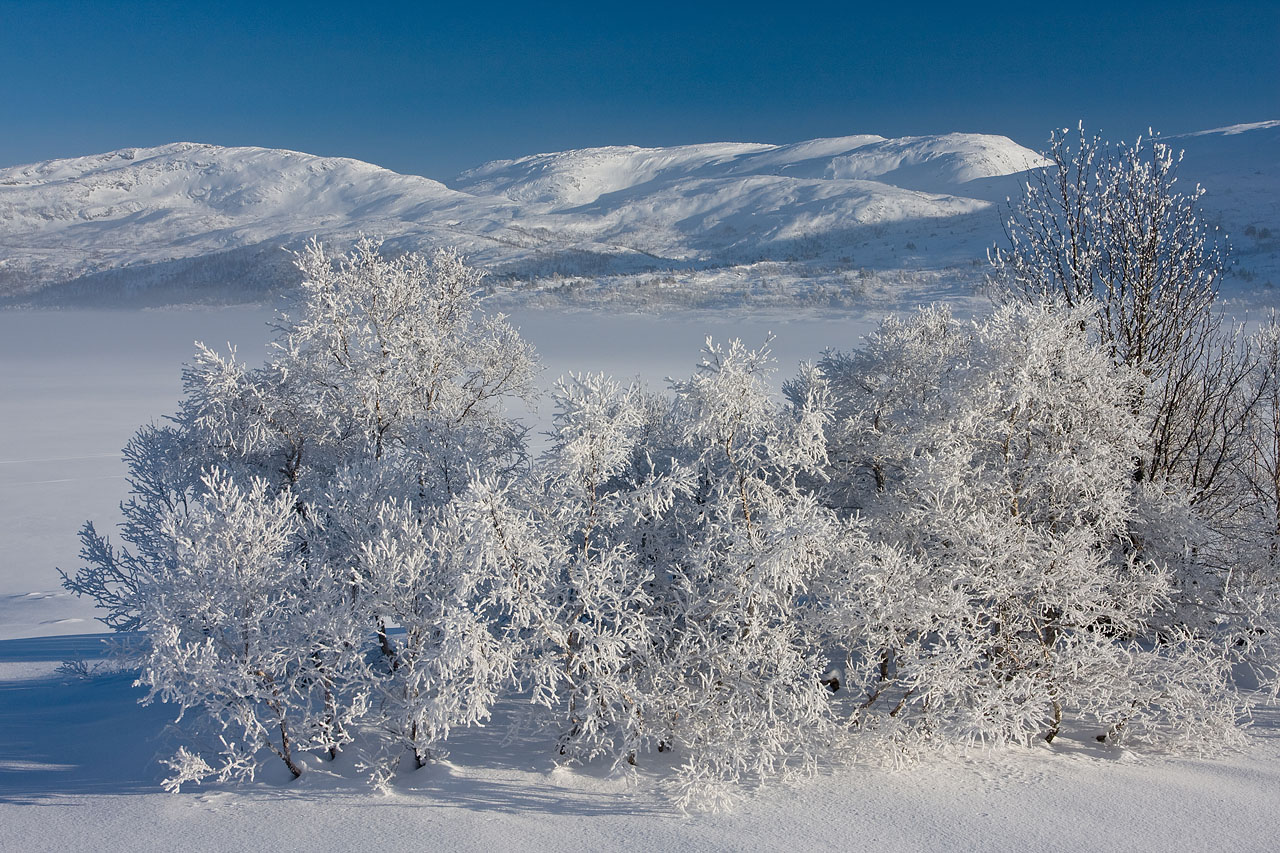
- Hamlagrøvatnet at wintertime (behind the trees)
- Interactive map of Hamlagrøvatnet
- Location: Kvam and Voss, Vestland
- Coordinates: 60.5523°N 6.1541°E
- Basin countries: Norway
- Max. length: 10 kilometres (6.2 mi)
- Max. width: 1.8 kilometres (1.1 mi)
- Surface area: 9.96 km^{2} (3.85 sq mi)
- Shore length^{1}: 28.01 km (17.40 mi)
- Surface elevation: 588 metres (1,929 ft)
- References: NVE
- ^{1} Shore length is not a well-defined measure.

Hamlagrøvatnet is a lake in Vestland county, Norway. The lake lies along the border of Voss Municipality and Kvam Municipality. At 10.3 square kilometres (4.0 sq mi), it is the largest lake in all of Hordaland. The lake is located about 17 kilometres (11 mi) southeast of the village of Dale (in Vaksdal Municipality) and about 10 kilometres (6.2 mi) south of the village of Evanger (in Voss Municipality).

The lake sits at the eastern end of the Bergsdalen valley and it is regulated at elevation of 588 to 560 metres (1,929 to 1,837 ft) above sea level. The lake is a reservoir on the river Bergsdalselvi which has four hydroelectric power stations on it. The lake is surrounded by many holiday cottages.

== See also ==
- List of lakes in Norway
