= John Archibald Purves =

English electrical engineer

John Archibald Purves FRSE (8 July 1870–11 April 1952) was an English electrical engineer best remembered as inventor of the Dynasphere. However, his biggest contribution was in the field of electricity supply.

Possibly owing to the error appearing throughout a May 1932 Popular Science magazine article on the Dynasphere, J. A. Purves' initials, in sources about his Dynasphere, are sometimes given as "J. H."

== Life and works ==
He was born in Taunton in Somerset on 8 July 1870.

He studied physics at the University of Edinburgh specialising in the then new field of electrical engineering. He graduated with a BSc and earned a doctorate (DSc) in 1899.

In Scotland, he helped to establish electricity companies in southern Scotland later merged to create the South of Scotland Electricity Board.

In 1897, he was elected a Fellow of the Royal Society of Edinburgh. His proposers were William Peddie, George Chrystal, Robert Boog Watson and Sir James Ormiston Affleck. At this time he lived at 4 Wardie Avenue in northern Edinburgh and appears to have been a partner in a firm named Lorrain & Purves, engineers and patent agents, of 53 York Place in the town centre.

In 1902, he moved to Devon in south-west England with his brother, William Thomson Purves. Together they founded the Paignton Power and Lighting Company in 1908 and created a consultative company, the Western Electricity Corporation in Exeter in the same year. The primary purpose of the latter was to promote hydro-electric schemes on Dartmoor. In 1920 when the Dartmoor Preservation Society successfully blocked the proposal.

In 1911, he was living at 6 Pennsylvania Park in Exeter. In 1926 he won the franchise to supply Bampton with electricity. In 1927 he won a franchise to supply electricity to South Molton. In 1928, with his friend Sir John Snell he began a roll-out programme of electricity supply systems under the West of England Electricity Ltd based in Honiton.

In 1930 he moved to Chilliswood outside Taunton and here he invented the Dynasphere.

He died at Collumpton in Devon on 11 April 1952.

== Family ==
He was married to Edith Purves (born 1869), and their children included Charles Eric Purves (born 1898).
