= Bergsdalen =

Valley in Vaksdal, Norway

- Length: 25 kilometres (16 mi) NW-SE
- Width: 1 kilometre (0.62 mi)

Geology
- Type: River valley

Geography
- Location: Vestland, Norway
- Coordinates: 60°34′06″N 05°55′59″E
- River: Bergsdalselvi

Location
- Interactive map of Bergsdalen

Bergsdalen is a river valley in Vaksdal Municipality in Vestland county, Norway. The 16-kilometre (9.9 mi) long valley begins at the lake Hamlagrøvatnet on the border of Vaksdal Municipality, Voss Municipality, and Kvam Municipality.

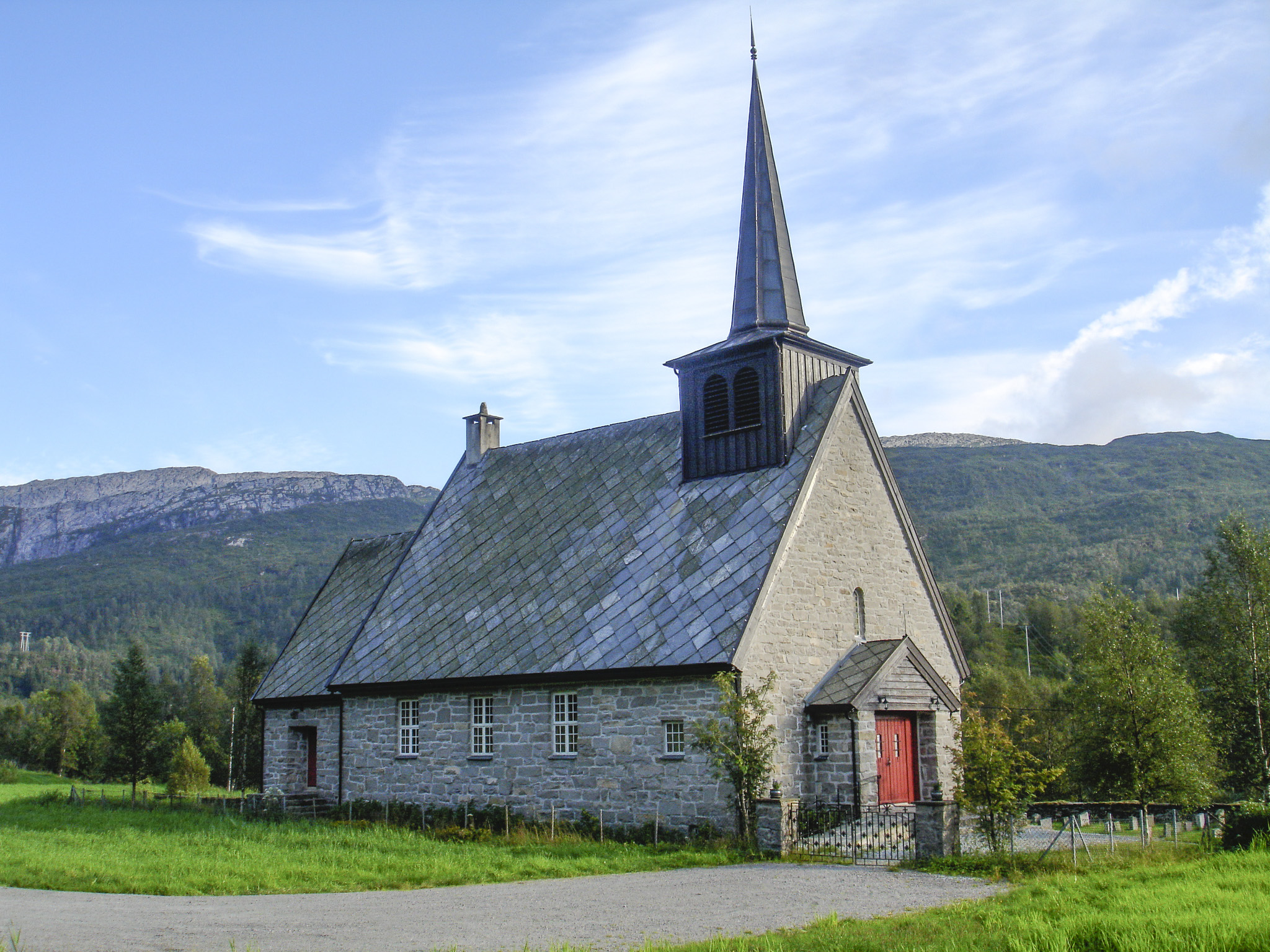
View of the Bergsdalen Church

The valley then runs to the northwest along the river Bergsdalselvi all the way to the village of Dale where the valley ends. This valley was historically part of the main route between the city of Bergen and Vossevangen, until the European route E16 highway was built to the north of the valley.

The Bergsdalen valley now is home to a significant number of mountain cabins and there is especially a lot of tourist activity in the winter. There are about 70 year-round residents of the valley (in 2024). There is a small school and Bergsdalen Church.
