= August 1955 =

Month of 1955

<<	August 1955					>>
Su	Mo	Tu	We	Th	Fr	Sa
	1	2	3	4	5	6
7	8	9	10	11	12	13
14	15	16	17	18	19	20
21	22	23	24	25	26	27
28	29	30	31

The following events occurred in August 1955:

== August 1, 1955 (Monday) ==
- Norway's Ministry of Pay and Prices was established, headed by Gunnar Bråthen.
- The Lockheed Article 001, a prototype of the Lockheed U-2 reconnaissance aircraft, made its maiden flight in what was intended to be only a high-speed taxi test at Groom Lake in Nevada, United States.

== August 2, 1955 (Tuesday) ==
- Died: Rupprecht, Crown Prince of Bavaria, 86, German military leader and last heir apparent to the Bavarian throne

== August 3, 1955 (Wednesday) ==
- The English-language première of Samuel Beckett's play Waiting for Godot, directed by Peter Hall, took place at the Arts Theatre, London.

== August 4, 1955 (Thursday) ==
- The 1955 Mitropa Cup football competition was won by Vörös Lobogó, with ÚDA Praha as runners-up after the second leg of the final.
- While her act was being filmed for NBC variety series The Jimmy Durante Show, Carmen Miranda complained of feeling ill and out of breath but finished her performance.

== August 5, 1955 (Friday) ==
- Died: Carmen Miranda, 46, Portuguese Brazilian singer and actress (pre-eclampsia)

== August 6, 1955 (Saturday) ==
- The French Southern and Antarctic Territories were created, as an overseas territory of France.

== August 7, 1955 (Sunday) ==
- The French département of Bône was created out of the eastern extremity of the former département of Constantine in Algeria.
- Born: Wayne Knight, American actor, in New York City

== August 8, 1955 (Monday) ==
- Composer Luigi Nono married Nuria, the daughter of another composer, Arnold Schoenberg, in Venice.
- At Edwards Air Force Base in California, an explosion occurred inside the rocket engine of the X-1A research aircraft while it was being carried under its B-29 mother ship prior to a planned flight by test pilot Joseph A. Walker. Walker climbed out of the X-1A back into the B-29, but pilot Stan Butchart, unable to risk landing the B-29 with the X-1A still attached to its underside, was forced to drop the rocket plane, which exploded in the desert.
- Died: Grace Hartman, 48, American actress

== August 9, 1955 (Tuesday) ==
- The Canadian National Railway opened its part of Walkley Yard in Ottawa, Canada.
- Born: Maud Olofsson, Swedish politician, in Arnäsvall

== August 10, 1955 (Wednesday) ==
- The Division of Stirling was created in a Western Australia electoral redistribution.

== August 11, 1955 (Thursday) ==
- As a formation of nine United States Air Force Fairchild C-119 Flying Boxcars flew over Edelweiler, near Stuttgart, West Germany, on a training mission carrying troops, one of them, a C-119G, experienced engine trouble, lost altitude momentarily, pulled upward abruptly, and collided with another C-119G. Both aircraft crashed, killing all 19 people aboard one and all 47 aboard the other. The combined death toll of 66 made it the worst aviation accident in German history at the time and the deadliest ever involving any variant of the C-119. It would tie with the March 22 crash of a United States Navy R6D-1 Liftmaster in Hawaii and the October 6 crash of United Airlines Flight 409 in Wyoming as the deadliest air accident of 1955.
- Burhanuddin Harahap became Prime Minister of Indonesia.

== August 12, 1955 (Friday) ==
- Hurricane Connie struck North Carolina as a Category 2 on the Saffir-Simpson scale.
- Died:
  - Thomas Mann, 80, German novelist, Nobel Prize laureate
  - James B. Sumner, 67, American chemist, Nobel Prize laureate

== August 13, 1955 (Saturday) ==
- Died: Florence Easton, 72, English-born operatic soprano

== August 14, 1955 (Sunday) ==
- The US schooner Levin J. Marvel capsized and sank in Chesapeake Bay with the loss of 14 of the 16 people on board. It was lost during high waves in Hurricane Connie.

== August 15, 1955 (Monday) ==
- Rear Admiral Royce de Mel became the first native Commander of the Royal Ceylon Navy. He would later be implicated in the 1962 Ceylonese coup d'état attempt.

== August 16, 1955 (Tuesday) ==
- Edward Makula set a new world record glider speed of 67.304 kilometres per hour (41.821 mph) over a triangular course of 200 kilometres (120 mi), the first of seven world records Makula would hold in the course of his career.

== August 17, 1955 (Wednesday) ==
- Died: Fernand Léger, 74, French painter and sculptor

== August 18, 1955 (Thursday) ==
- The First Sudanese Civil War began.
- First meeting of the Organization of Central American States (Organización de Estados Centroamericanos, ODECA), in Antigua Guatemala.

== August 19, 1955 (Friday) ==
- Hurricane Diane hit the northeastern United States, killing over 200 people and causing over $1.0 billion in damage.

== August 20, 1955 (Saturday) ==
- Dorothy Hodgkin and her colleagues published the final structure of vitamin B_{12}.
- In Algeria, the Battle of Philippeville, also known as the Philippeville massacre or the August Offensive, began when several thousand civilians launched a general assault on the city of Philippeville, to attack Europeans and moderate Muslim personalities. Over a hundred people, mainly European civilians, were killed in this and the accompanying attacks.
- Flying a U.S. Air Force North American F-100C Super Sabre, Horace A. Haines set a world speed record of 822.135 mph (1,323.889 km/h).

== August 21, 1955 (Sunday) ==
- The Kelly-Hopkinsville encounter, a claimed alien and UFO encounter in Christian County, Kentucky.

== August 22, 1955 (Monday) ==
- Eleven schoolchildren were killed when their school bus was hit by a freight train in Spring City, Tennessee, United States after the driver disregarded a crossing signal; a further 39 were injured.
- Born: Bouaré Fily Sissoko, Malian politician

== August 23, 1955 (Tuesday) ==
- The Westland Widgeon helicopter made its maiden flight.
- Died: Rudolf Minger, 73, Swiss politician

== August 25, 1955 (Thursday) ==
- In China, the Sufan movement issued its "Directive on the thorough purge and cleansing of hidden counter-revolutionaries".
- While on a voyage from Hampton Roads, Virginia, United States, to Copenhagen, Denmark, the British cargo ship Argobeam was caught in a hurricane in the Atlantic Ocean. It caught fire and was abandoned by the crew. A few days later it was taken in to Stornoway, Isle of Lewis, and would eventually be repaired and returned to service as Parkgate.

== August 26, 1955 (Friday) ==
- Satyajit Ray's film Pather Panchali was released in Calcutta, India, receiving a poor initial response but quickly attracting audiences to become a classic of Indian cinema.

== August 27, 1955 (Saturday) ==
- The first edition of the Guinness Book of Records was published, in London, compiled by Norris and Ross McWhirter.
- Born: Sergey Khlebnikov, Soviet speed skater (d. 1999)

== August 28, 1955 (Sunday) ==
- The Challenge Round of the 1955 Davis Cup tennis competition was won by Australia at the West Side Tennis Club, Forest Hills, New York, USA.
- A US-registered tugboat, the Harold J, sank in the Bering Sea near Lopp Lagoon on the Alaskan coast in a storm, with the loss of three crew members.
- Died: Emmett Till, 14, African-American teenager, was beaten and shot to death in Mississippi for allegedly speaking to a white woman.

== August 29, 1955 (Monday) ==
- A British Royal Air Force English Electric Canberra set a new world altitude record of 65,876 ft (20,079 m).
- The 1955 CCCF Championship soccer competition ended in victory for Costa Rica.

== August 30, 1955 (Tuesday) ==
- U.S. Patrolmen William Hudec and Warren Stainbrook of the Cleveland Division of Police were killed when a train struck the police ambulance they were driving. Hudec was the father of actress Majel Leigh Hudec, who would later be better known as Majel Barrett and play multiple roles in the Star Trek franchise.

== August 31, 1955 (Wednesday) ==
- The Hudson and Manhattan Railroad began experiments with air conditioning on its subway cars, a technology that the New York City Subway system had declared impractical before then. This experiment resulted in the first successful production application of air conditioning in a rapid transit car, 50 cars (20 owned by H&M, 30 by H&M parent PRR) built by St. Louis Car Company in 1958.
- Lockheed Aircraft Corporation engineering test pilot Stanley Beltz was killed in a crash near Lancaster, California, USA, while piloting an F-94B Starfire modified to test the nose section of the BOMARC missile.
- Emmett Till's decomposed corpse was pulled from Mississippi's Tallahatchie River. Moses Wright identified the body from a ring with the initials L.T.
