= Eric Eastwood (engineer) =

British scientist and engineer

Sir Eric Eastwood CBE FRS, (12 March 1910 – 6 October 1981) was a British scientist and engineer who helped develop radar technology during World War II.

== Early years ==
Eastwood was educated at Oldham High School and then attended Manchester University, studying under Lawrence Bragg. Following graduation he began research in Spectroscopy at Christ's College, Cambridge, with C. P. Snow as his supervisor, gaining a PhD in 1935. He taught physics at the Liverpool Collegiate School for a while.

== RAF career ==
Eastwood joined the Royal Air Force, and attained the rank of Squadron Leader. He worked throughout the war on the technical issues related to radar and its uses by the Fighter Defences.

== Postwar career ==
Following the end of the war, he was recruited to English Electric Company by his former supervisor at Cambridge, C. P. Snow. Initially he worked at the Nelson Research Laboratory working on synchrotron generators high-voltage impulse X ray tubes. After the English Electric Company acquired the Marconi Company in 1946, Eastwood joined the Marconi Research Laboratory in Great Baddow. Here he concentrated on extending the Laboratory's activities in communications, radar and applied physics. In 1954 he was promoted to Director of Research of the Marconi Company, and became then in 1962 Research Director of the English Electric Group.

In 1967 he presented the Bernard Price Memorial Lecture and was elected President of the Institution of Electrical Engineers in 1972. He was elected a Fellow of the Royal Society in 1968 and delivered their first Clifford Paterson Lecture in 1976 on the subject of radar.

Eastwood was appointed a Commander of the Order of the British Empire (CBE) in 1962 and knighted in 1973.

He also received an Honorary Doctorate from Heriot-Watt University in 1977.
