= Little Baddow =

Village in Essex, England

Coordinates: 51.742°N 0.573°E

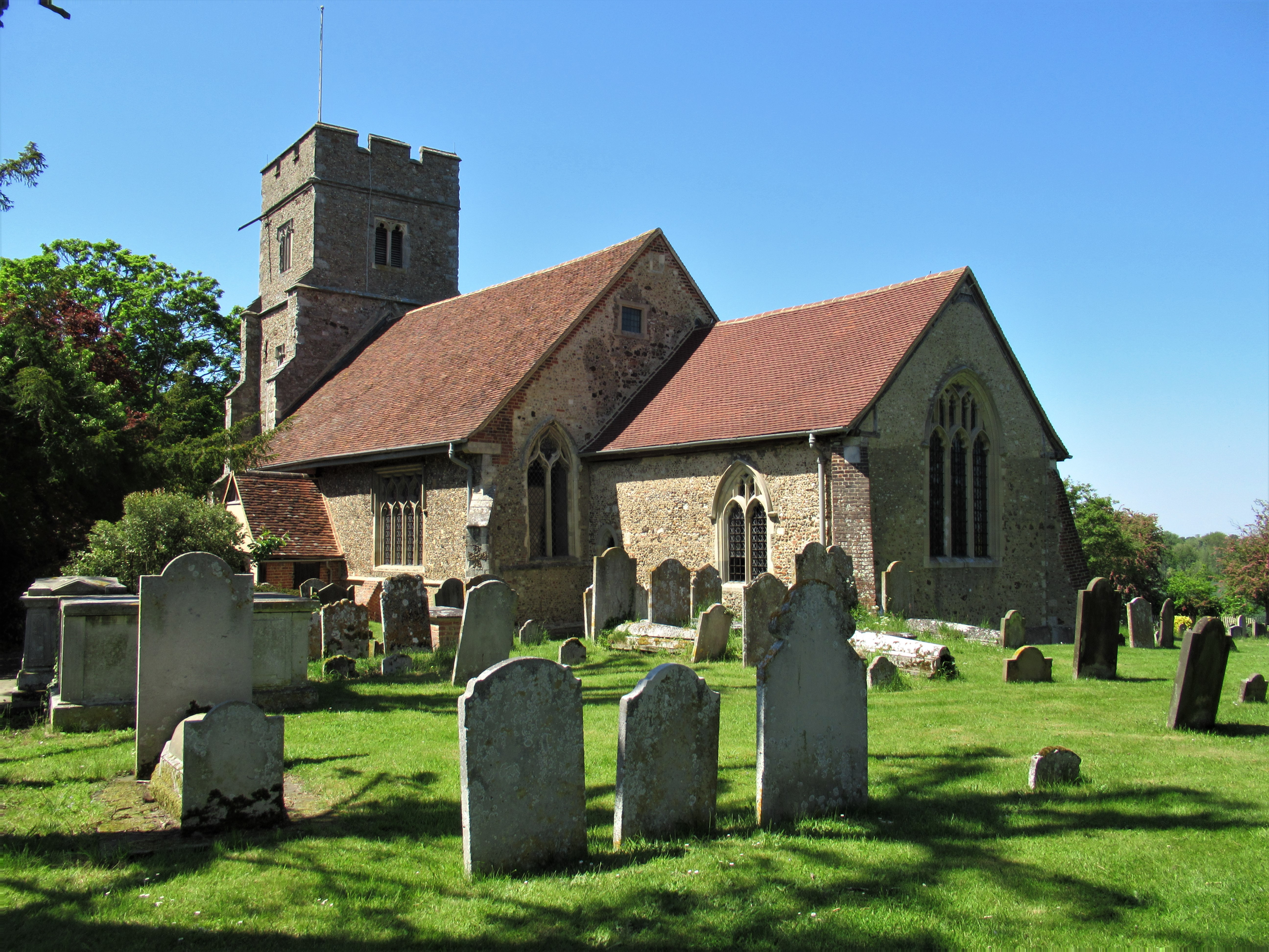
- St Mary's, Little Baddow

- Location within Essex
- Population: 1,600 (Parish, 2021)
- OS grid reference: TL776080
- Civil parish: Little Baddow
- District: Chelmsford
- Shire county: Essex
- Region: East
- Country: England
- Sovereign state: United Kingdom
- Post town: Chelmsford
- Postcode district: CM3
- Dialling code: 01245
- Police: Essex
- Fire: Essex
- Ambulance: East of England
- UK Parliament: Maldon & East Chelmsford

Little Baddow is a village and civil parish in the Chelmsford district of Essex, England, lying to the east of Chelmsford itself. At the 2021 census the parish had a population of 1,600.

The name Baddow is believed to have been derived from the River Beadwan, now known as the River Chelmer, which marks the northern boundary of the village. Beadwan is thought to be a Celtic word of uncertain meaning, possibly "birch stream" or a reference to the goddess Badbh.

The village includes woodlands owned by the National Trust and Essex Naturalist Trust.

Although there are no shops in the village, there are two pubs, The Generals Arms and The Rodney, a village hall, and Elm Green Preparatory School. Churches are the Anglican St Mary the Virgin and the United Reformed Church. St Mary's is a Grade I listed building with a late 11th-century core. It contains a 14th-century 'Devil's door', dating to the time when medieval Christians believed the North of side of a church to be the abode of the Devil.

The village sports ground and clubhouse is used by Little Baddow Cricket club and the local running club, Little Baddow "Ridge" runners.

The manor was once a possession of Robert the Bruce.

Thomas Hooker who founded the colony of Connecticut lived in the village and was a school teacher there before going to Holland and then to New England. Missionary John Eliot, ‘Apostle to the Indians’, served here as Hooker’s assistant.

Eric Eastwood settled in Little Baddow after he started work at Marconi Research Laboratory in 1948. He lived there until his death in his home in 1978.
