= Bergsdalen Church =

Church in Vestland, Norway

- Bergsdalen kyrkje
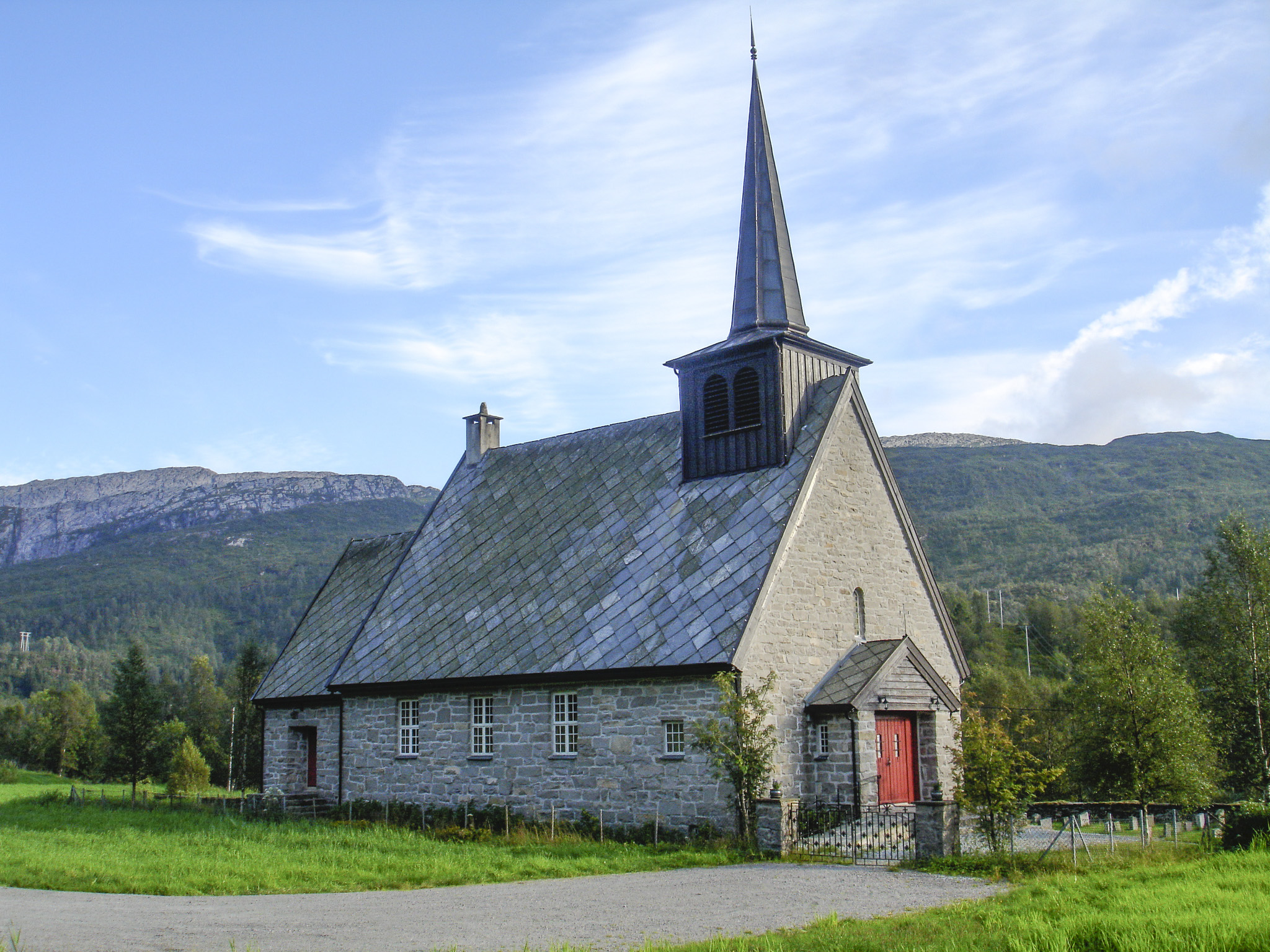
- View of the church
- Bergsdalen Church
- 60°34′18″N 5°57′02″E
- Location: Vaksdal, Vestland
- Country: Norway
- Denomination: Church of Norway
- Churchmanship: Evangelical Lutheran

History
- Status: Parish church
- Founded: 1943
- Consecrated: 3 July 1955

Architecture
- Functional status: Active
- Architect: Leiv Tvilde
- Architectural type: Long church
- Completed: 1955 (71 years ago)

Specifications
- Capacity: 140
- Materials: Stone

Administration
- Diocese: Bjørgvin bispedømme
- Deanery: Hardanger og Voss prosti
- Parish: Bergsdalen
- Norwegian Cultural Heritage Site
- Type: Church
- Status: Not protected
- ID: 83878

Bergsdalen Church (Norwegian: Bergsdalen kyrkje) is a parish church of the Church of Norway in Vaksdal Municipality in Vestland county, Norway. It is located in the Bergsdalen valley, east of the village of Dale. It is the church for the Bergsdalen parish which is part of the Hardanger og Voss prosti (deanery) in the Diocese of Bjørgvin. The gray, stone church was built in a long church design in 1955 using plans drawn up by the architect Leiv Tvilde. The church seats about 140 people.

== History ==
In 1902, a cemetery was built to serve the mountain valley of Bergsdalen. Nearly 50 years later, a church was built beside the cemetery so that the people of the valley did not have to travel so far to get to a church. The church was designed by Leiv Tvilde and Johannes Øvsthus was the lead builder. The stone church has a nave with a choir on the east end. There's a small sacristy extension off of the choir. The church porch is located on the west end of the nave. There is a basement under the church which houses a church hall. The new church was consecrated on 3 July 1955 by the Bishop Ragnvald Indrebø.

== See also ==
- List of churches in Bjørgvin
