= Dynasphere (vehicle) =

Monowheel vehicle patented in 1930

John Archibald Purves' Dynasphere on the beach, 1932. The driver is his son.

The Dynasphere (sometimes misspelled Dynosphere) is a monowheel vehicle design patented in 1930 by John Archibald Purves FRSE (7 August 1870 – 4 November 1952) from Taunton, Somerset, UK.

Purves' idea for the vehicle was inspired by a sketch made by Leonardo da Vinci.

== Design ==
Two prototypes were initially built: a smaller electrical model, and one with a petrol motor that attained either 2.5 or 6 horsepower depending on the source consulted, using a two-cylinder air-cooled Douglas engine with a three speed gear box, also providing reverse. The Dynasphere model reached top speeds of 25–30 miles per hour (40–48 km/h). The petrol-powered prototype was 10-foot (3.0 m) high and built of iron latticework that weighed 1,000 pounds (450 kg). The next generation version had ten outer hoops, covered with a leather lining, shaped to present a small profile to the ground.

The driver's seat and the motor were part of one unit, mounted with wheels upon the interior rails of the outer hoop. The singular driving seat and motor unit, when powered forward, would thus try to "climb" up the spherical rails, which would cause the lattice cage to roll forward. Steering of the prototype was crude, requiring the driver to lean in the direction sought to travel, though Purves envisioned future models equipped with gears that would shift the inner housing without leaning, thus tipping the Dynasphere in the direction of travel. The later ten-hoop model had a steering wheel engaging such tipping gears, and was captured in a 1932 Pathé newsreel, in which the vehicle's advantages are first described and then demonstrated at the Brooklands motor racing circuit. Beatrice Shilling and the inventor's son C E Purves subjected the model to a road test, which included an attempt to pull it over. A novelty model was later constructed by Purves that could seat eight passengers, the "Dynasphere 8", made specifically for beach use.

== History ==
Purves was optimistic about his invention's prospects. As reported in a 1932 Popular Science magazine article, after a filmed test drive in 1932 on a beach in Weston-super-Mare, Somerset, he stated that the Dynasphere "reduced locomotion to the simplest possible form, with consequent economy of power", and that it was "the high-speed vehicle of the future". An article in the February 1935 issue of Meccano Magazine noted that though the Dynasphere was only at an experimental stage, "it possesses so many advantages that we may eventually see gigantic wheels similar to that shown on our cover running along our highways in as large numbers as motor cars do to-day." According to the 2007 book Crazy Cars, one reason the Dynasphere did not succeed was that "while the [vehicle] could move along just fine, it was almost impossible to steer or brake." Another aspect of the vehicle that received criticism was the phenomenon of "gerbiling"—the tendency when accelerating or braking the vehicle for the independent housing holding the driver within the monowheel to spin within the moving structure.

== See also ==
- Monowheel
