= George Nelson, 2nd Baron Nelson of Stafford =

British businessman (1917–1995)

(Henry) George Nelson, 2nd Baron Nelson of Stafford (2 January 1917 – 19 January 1995) was an English engineer who made a notable contribution to the development of civil nuclear power.

== Background ==
George Nelson was born in Stretford, Manchester, as the only son of the electrical engineer George Nelson, later Baron Nelson, who, over 30 years, led English Electric from 4,000 to 80,000 employees. His mother, who came to be known as Jane, was born Florence Mabel Howe and was the only daughter of a Leicestershire JP. The younger Nelson was educated at Oundle School and King's College, Cambridge, where he won an exhibition and took his degree in the Mechanical Sciences Tripos. After two years of practical experience in France and Switzerland and the onset of war in 1939, he was appointed superintendent of English Electric's Preston works.

== English Electric ==
When English Electric bought D Napier & Son in 1942, George Nelson was appointed Napier's managing director. He moved from Napier's in 1949 to become deputy managing director of English Electric and was appointed managing director in 1956 following his father. By the age of 40, he was on the main board of English Electric. He was appointed chairman on his father's death in 1962. In 1968, English Electric was taken over by GEC. Nelson was appointed chairman of GEC and held that appointment for 15 years until his retirement in 1983, though he remained a further four years on the GEC main board even after retirement as chairman.

=== British Aircraft Corporation ===
He continued his association with military aviation begun at Preston in 1939. When English Electric merged aviation operations with Vickers and Bristol in 1960 he was appointed one of two deputies to the chairman, Lord Portal and remained deputy chairman until 1977.

=== Nuclear power ===
Nelson moved English Electric into nuclear power generation as a part of the consortium Atomic Power Construction Company Ltd to build the Sizewell and Hinkley Point nuclear power stations.

== Outside interests ==
=== UK's first business and management schools ===
George Nelson led the campaign to raise funds for UK's first business and management schools, London and Manchester, and was particularly proud of his appointment as the first chancellor of Aston University. in which position he served from 1966 until 1979.

Nelson was a director of the Bank of England for more than 25 years, 1961 to 1987.

He was a member of the three engineering institutions — electrical, mechanical and civil — and served as president of the Institution of Electrical Engineers in 1970. He also served for many years on the Engineering & Allied Employers National Federation later the Engineering Employers' Federation.

He served on many public bodies including the civil service selection board and the Advisory Council on Technology.

Nelson died at Stafford 19 January 1995 survived by his wife who he had married on 8 Jun 1940, Pamela Roy Bird, the daughter of Ernest Roy Bird MP, of New House Farm, Robertsbridge, Sussex. They had two sons and two daughters. His elder son, the Hon Henry Roy George Nelson, inherited his title as 3rd Baron Nelson of Stafford.

Peerage of the United Kingdom
Preceded by George Nelson	Baron Nelson of Stafford; 1962–1995	Succeeded by Henry Nelson
