= Charles Edmund Webber =

British soldier, engineer and author

Charles Edumund Webber CB
- Born: 5 September 1838; Dublin
- Died: 23 September 1904 (aged 66); Margate
- Burial place: St Margaret of Antioch, Lee Green; 51°27.77′N 0°0.05′E
- Spouse: Alice Augusta Gertrude Hanbury Tracy
- Relatives: 2nd Baron Sudeley (father-in-law)
- Military career
- Branch: Army
- Rank: Major-General
- Unit: Corps of Royal Engineers
- Awards: Companion of the Order of the Bath; Order of the Medjidieh
- Other work: Co-founder Society of Telegraph Engineers; President IEE

Charles Edmund Webber CB (5 September 1838 – 23 September 1904) was a British soldier, engineer and author.

== Early life and family ==
Born in Dublin, Ireland, Charles was the third son of Rev. Thomas Webber, of Leekfield, County Sligo and Frances Kelly, daughter of the noted evangelical preacher and hymn writer Thomas Kelly. He was educated in private schools prior to his military education.

== Military career ==
Webber entered the Royal Military Academy, Woolwich in 1853 and was commissioned as lieutenant in the Corps of Royal Engineers in 1855.

=== India ===
Webber served in India during the Indian Mutiny, 1857–1860 In September 1857 he was posted with the 21 company Royal Engineers who joined the 1st Brigade seeing action at the Betwa River and Jhansi and was twice mentioned in dispatches. He remained in the field until April 1859, then served in the public works departments at Gwalior and Allahabad before returning to England in May 1860.

On his return to England, he served in the Brighton district and it was here in 1861 that he married Alice Augusta Gertrude Hanbury Tracy, fourth daughter of Thomas Hanbury-Tracy, 2nd Baron Sudeley.

The same year he returned to the Military Academy at Woolwich as Instructor in Military Drawing, and Surveying. He was promoted captain on 1 April 1862.

During the Austro-Prussian War, in 1866, Webber was attached to the Prussian army to report on engineering operations and military telegraphs. Other special missions abroad followed, with duty at the Curragh Camp from 1867 to 1869.

=== Post Office ===
Later in 1869, whilst in command of the 22nd company Royal Engineers at Chatham, Webber and his men were lent to the Post Office to assist in constructing and organising the telegraph service. In 1871 the 34th company was added to Webber's command and stationed at Inverness. Six officers and 153 non-commissioned officers and men of the Royal Engineers were employed in the Post Office at that time. More than 1000 line miles and more than 3200 wire miles were laid by them over and under ground in 1871. In 1872 he was promoted to the rank of major. In total Webber trained over 300 non-commissioned officers and men in the work of telegraphy. The work for the Post Office was completed in 1879.

=== Foreign service ===
He was subsequently posted to South Africa in 1879 at the outbreak of the first Boer War. Webber was promoted again, in January 1882, to the rank of lieutenant colonel and, in August, appointed assistant-adjutant and quartermaster general at the headquarters of the Egyptian Expedition in 1882. His contribution was acknowledged in November of the same year, Webber was made a Companion of the Order of the Bath. He was also awarded the Order of the Medjidieh for his services in Egypt. In 1884 he was promoted to the rank of colonel and made Director of Army Telegraphs, until, in 1885, he was declared supernumerary.

== Civilian Engineering ==
While still in the public service Webber served on the boards of the Bell Telephone Company, and the United Bell and Edison Telephone Company, becoming a Director of the latter. Following retirement he became Consulting Engineer to the City of London Pioneer Electric Light Company, the Chelsea Electricity Supply Company, the Anglo-American Brush Electric Light Corporation and was a Director of the latter two.

Webber was a co-founder, with Sir Francis Bolton, of the Society of Telegraph Engineers which, in 1880 became the Institute of Electrical Engineers and of which Webber served as president in 1882. Within the Institute, Webber's practical background was sometimes in marked contrast to some of his more academic contemporaries such as John Ambrose Fleming.

== Later life and family ==
Following the death of Frederick Tollemache in 1889, Webber was appointed to join his father-in-law as one of the Dysart Trustees.

Charles Edmund Webber died in Margate, Kent in 1904 and is buried in the churchyard of St Margaret of Antioch, Lee Green.

== Works ==
Webber published several works during the course of his career and edited a biography of Henry Drury Harness. His contribution on Light Railways to the Encyclopædia Britannica was published several years after his death.

- C.E.W (1869). Military Work by Military Labour. With a Few Remarks on Mr. Hanbury Tracy's Motion Before Parliament. By an Officer of Royal Engineers. Buck. OCLC 36578197.
- Webber, Charles Edmund (1873). "On the application of iron telegraph poles". Journal of the Society of Telegraph Engineering. 2. London: 3–26.
- Webber, Charles Edmund (1879). Orders in the field and the means of communicating them. London. 26 pp. 8vo.
- Preece, W. H.; Rawson, F. L.; Bernstein, A.; Crompton, R. E.; Hughes, D. E.; Evans, Mortimer; Drake, Bernard M.; Forbes, George; Salomons, David; Ayrton, W. E.; Thomson, Silvanus P.; Webber, C.E. (1886). "Discussion on "Electric Lighting by Means of Low-Resistance Glow Lamps". Journal of the Society of Telegraph-Engineers and Electricians. 15 (61): 178–97. doi:10.1049/jste-3.1886.0010.
- Callender; Webber, Charles Edmund (1887). The distribution of electricity by conductors placed underground. London. 3 pp. i plate. 4to.
- Cardew, Major; Webber, Charles; Bright, W. P.; Granville, F. Wyles; Mordey, W. M. (1890). "Remarks on "On Signalling across Rivers in India"". Journal of the Institution of Electrical Engineers. 19 (87): 331–38. doi:10.1049/jiee-1.1890.0016.
- Saunders, H.A.C.; Thomson, William; Preece, William H.; Bright, Charles; Stiffe, Captain A.W.; Mance, Sir Henry; Cardew, Major; Hughes, Professor D.E.; Webber, Major-General; Ayrton, Professor W.E.; Mordey, W.M.; Spagnoletti, C. E.; Crompton, R.E.; Sayers, W.B.; Lodge, Oliver (1890). "Discussion on Dr. Oliver Lodge's Paper, "on Lightning-Guards for Telegraphic Purposes, and on the Protection of Cables from Lightning"". Journal of the Institution of Electrical Engineers. 19 (87): 382–410. doi:10.1049/jiee-1.1890.0021.
- Bennett, A.R.; Webber, Charles Edmund (1895). The Development of the Telephone Service in Agricultural Districts. London: N.J. Franklin. OCLC 504761176.
- Evershed, Sydney; Preece, William H.; Fleming, John Ambrose; Webber, C. E.; Whitehead, C. S.; Mance, H.; Sennett, A. R.; Ayrton, W. E.; Lodge, Oliver (1898). "Continuation of Discussion on Dr. Lodge's Paper, "Improvements in Magnetic Space Telegraphy", and Mr. S. Evershed's Paper, "Telegraphy by Magnetic Induction"". Journal of the Institution of Electrical Engineers. 27 (137): 887–922. doi:10.1049/jiee-1.1898.0036.
- Collinson, T. (1903). Webber, Charles E. (ed.). General Sir Henry Drury Harness. OCLC 61599843.
- Webber, Charles Edmund (1911). "Railways/Light Railways" . In Chisholm, Hugh (ed.). Encyclopædia Britannica. Vol. 22 (11th ed.). Cambridge University Press. p. 859.
