= Nelson baronets =

Set index for Nelson baronets

There have been two baronetcies created for persons with the surname Nelson, both in the Baronetage of the United Kingdom. As of 2026 both creations are extant.

- Nelson baronets of Acton Park (1912)
- Nelson baronets of Hilcote Hall (1955): see Baron Nelson of Stafford
