= Baron Nelson of Stafford =

Barony in the Peerage of the United Kingdom

Barony Nelson of Stafford
- Argent a cross flory sable, a chief gules, thereon between a Stafford knot and a rose argent, barbed and seeded proper, a pale also argent charged with a sword erect gules
- Creation date: 20 January 1960
- Created by: Queen Elizabeth II
- Peerage: Peerage of the United Kingdom
- First holder: George Horatio Nelson, 1st Baron Nelson of Stafford
- Present holder: Alistair Nelson, 4th Baron Nelson of Stafford
- Heir presumptive: Hon. James Jonathan Nelson
- Remainder to: Heirs male of the body lawfully begotten
- Status: Extant
- Former seat: Hilcote Hall
- Motto: Who leads serves

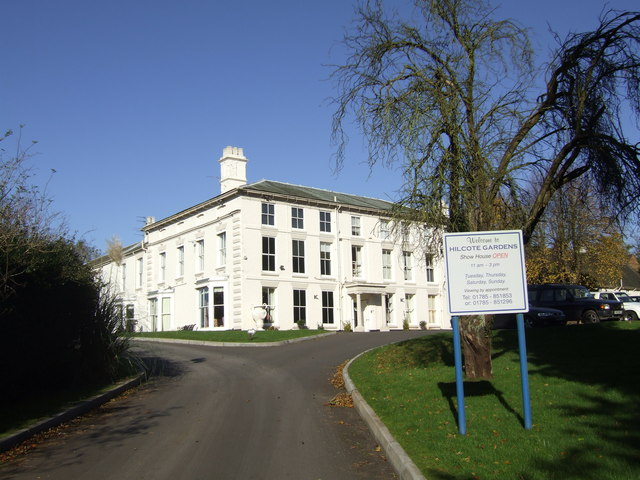
Hilcote Hall

Baron Nelson of Stafford, of Hilcote Hall in the County of Stafford, is a title in the Peerage of the United Kingdom. It was created in 1960 for the businessman Sir George Nelson, 1st Baronet, who for many years was Chairman of English Electric. He had already been created a Baronet in the Baronetage of the United Kingdom in 1955. He was succeeded by his only son, the second Baron. He was also Chairman of English Electric as well as a director of the Bank of England. As of 2026, the titles are held by his grandson, the fourth Baron, who succeeded his father in 2006.

== Barons Nelson of Stafford (1960) ==
- George Horatio Nelson, 1st Baron Nelson of Stafford (1887–1962)
  - Henry George Nelson, 2nd Baron Nelson of Stafford (1917–1995)
    - Henry Roy George Nelson, 3rd Baron Nelson of Stafford (1943–2006)
      - Alistair William Henry Nelson, 4th Baron Nelson of Stafford (b. 1973)
    - (1) Hon. James Jonathan Nelson (b. 1947)

The heir presumptive and sole heir to the titles is the present holder's uncle Hon. James Jonathan Nelson (b. 1947).
