= List of University College London people =

This is a list of people associated with University College London, including notable staff and alumni associated with the institution.

== Founders and supporters ==
=== Founders ===
Apart from Jeremy Bentham, all these men were named (in Latin) on the Foundation Stone.

- James Abercromby, 1st Baron Dunfermline (1776–1858), Scottish peer and British statesman
- Prince Augustus Frederick, Duke of Sussex (1773–1843), Grand Master of English Freemasons (the United Grand Lodge of England), 1813–1843, supporter of UCL; he laid the foundation stone of the new university on 30 April 1827
- Alexander Baring, 1st Baron Ashburton (1774–1848), British politician and financier
- Jeremy Bentham (1748–1832), English philosopher; a leading advocate for the foundation of UCL
- George Birkbeck (1776–1841), British Quaker, doctor, academic, philanthropist, and early pioneer in adult education; founder of Birkbeck College
- Henry Brougham, 1st Baron Brougham and Vaux (1778–1868), Scottish-born British statesman and slavery abolitionist, leading advocate in Parliament for the foundation of UCL
- Thomas Campbell (1777–1844), Scottish poet, founding father of UCL
- Francis Augustus Cox (1783–1853), Baptist minister, active supporter of the foundation of UCL
- George Eden, 1st Earl of Auckland, British statesman
- Sir Isaac Lyon Goldsmid (1778–1859), financier, promoter of UK Jewry's emancipation; advocate for the foundation of UCL and a very generous benefactor
- Olinthus Gregory (1774–1841), English mathematician, author and editor
- George Grote (1794–1871), English classical historian
- Henry Howard, 13th Duke of Norfolk (1791–1856), Catholic peer, and advocate for the foundation of UCL
- Joseph Hume (1777–1855), Scottish doctor and politician
- Zachary Macaulay (1768–1838), Scottish-born slavery abolitionist, Governor of Sierra Leone, and active supporter of the foundation of UCL
- Sir James Mackintosh (1765–1832), Scottish jurist, politician and historian
- James Mill (1773–1836), Scottish historian, economist, political theorist, and philosopher; advocate for the foundation of UCL
- John Russell, 1st Earl Russell (1792–1878), British statesman
- Henry Warburton (1784–1858), English merchant and politician, and also an enthusiastic amateur scientist
- John Ward, 1st Earl of Dudley (1781–1833), British statesman
- William Wilkins (1778–1839), original architect of the main campus
- Thomas Wilson (1764–1843), Congregationalist benefactor of chapels and educational institutions, founder member of the UCL Council from 1825

A translation of the Latin text engraved on a metal plate that was buried with the foundation stone reads as follows:

To God's favour the greatest and best, eternal architect of the universe may it bring you happiness and good fortune at the beginning of the eighth year of the reign of King George IV of Britain the most highest prince Augustus Frederick Duke of Sussex patron of all the fine arts the oldest order of architecture the highest among the English the foundation stone of the London University between city state [i.e. citizens] and brothers standing around will be placed by his hand to applause.

Day before the day before the Kalends of May

The work of God desired by the most fortunate citizens of this town has begun at last in the year of human greeting 1827 and in the year of light 5827.

In the name of these most illustrious men who are present and with the guidance of Henry Duke of Norfolk, Henry Marquis of Lansdown, Lord John Russell, John, Viscount Dudley and Ward, George, Baron Auckland, the Hon. James Abercrombie and Sir James Macintosh, Alexander Baring, Henry Bougham, Isaac Lyon Goldsmid, George Grote, Zachary Macaulay, Benjamin Shaw, William Tooke, Henry Waymouth, George Birkbeck, Thomas Campbell, Olinthus Gregory, Joseph Hume, James Mill, John Smith, Henry Warburton, John Wishaw, Thomas Wilson, and William Wilkins, architect.

=== Supporters ===
==== Benefactors ====
- Sir Herbert Bartlett (1842–1921), civil engineer, enabled the establishment of the UCL Bartlett School of Architecture
- Sir Francis Galton, eugenicist and supporter of statistics and eugenics at UCL
- Sir Isaac Lyon Goldsmid (1778–1859), financier, promoter of UK Jewry's emancipation; advocate for the foundation of UCL and a very generous benefactor

==== Council members ====
- Timothy Clement-Jones, Baron Clement-Jones (1949–)
- Shreela Flather, Baroness Flather (1934–), British politician, UCL alumna, and the first South Asian woman to receive a peerage
- Sir Stephen Wall, British diplomat, leading Catholic layman, chairman of Council (2008–)
- Thomas Wilson (1764–1843), Congregationalist benefactor of chapels and educational institutions, founder member of the UCL Council from 1825
- Thomas Field Gibson (1803–1889), manufacturer and benefactor, on Council 1851–68
- Harry Woolf, Baron Woolf, UCL alumnus; variously visitor, deputy chairman and chairman of the Council (2005–08), and chairman of the UCL Institute of Advanced Legal Studies

== Fields Medallists ==
The Fields Medal is often described as the "Nobel Prize in Mathematics". The UCL mathematical community has produced three Fields Medallists:

1998: Timothy Gowers

- Faculty member of the Department of Mathematics (1991–1995)

1970: Alan Baker

- BSc (1961), professor (1964–1965)

1958: Klaus Roth

- MSc (1948), PhD (1950), professor (1948–1966)

== Former staff ==
=== Art, architecture, and design ===
- Dame Phyllida Barlow, sculptor
- Tancred Borenius (1885–1948), art historian, diplomat and British wartime spy
- Sir Peter Cook (1936–), architect, The Bartlett Professor of Architecture
- Stuart Brisley, performance artist
- Thorold Dickinson (1903–84), film maker; Britain's first professor of film studies
- Thomas Leverton Donaldson (1795–1885), architect, first UCL professor of architecture
- Lucian Freud (1922–2011), painter
- Roger Fry (1866–1934), painter, art critic
- Christine Hawley, architect, first female head of the Barlett
- John Hooper Harvey (1911–97), architectural historian, Bartlett School of Architecture, 1950–59
- Tim Head, artist
- John Hilliard, artist
- Otto Königsberger (1908–1999), architect
- Michael (Edward) Parsons (1938–), avant-garde composer, and lecturer in fine art
- Cameron Sinclair (1973–), co-founder of Architecture for Humanity

=== Engineering sciences ===
- Eric Ash (1928–2021), head of Department of Electronic and Electrical Engineering, Pender Chair 1979–1986
- Harold Barlow, staff, then Pender Chair in the Department of Electronic and Electrical Engineering (1950–1966)
- Thomas Hudson Beare (1859–1940), chair of engineering 1889–1901
- Henry Chilver, Baron Chilver of Cranfield (1926–), 1961–69
- Jon Crowcroft, professor of networked systems in computer science
- Alexander Lamb Cullen, head of Department of Electronic and Electrical Engineering, Pender Chair 1967–1980
- Sir David Davies, head of the Department of Electronic and Electrical Engineering (1985–1988)
- John William Draper, pioneer astro-photographer who also took the oldest surviving picture of a woman
- Anthony Finkelstein, head of Computer Science and Dean of the UCL Faculty of Engineering Sciences until 2015
- John Fleming (1849–1945)
- William Edward Gibbs (1890–1934), Ramsay Memorial Professor of Chemical Engineering
- Eaton Hodgkinson, professor of the mechanical principles of engineering (appointed in 1847)
- Reginald Otto Kapp (1885–1966), head of Department of Electronic and Electrical Engineering, Pender Chair 1935–1945
- Peter T. Kirstein (1933–2020), head of computer science department 1980–1994
- John Edwin Midwinter (1938–2021), Pender Professor of Electronic Engineering 1991–2004, vice provost 1994–1999
- John Millington (1779–1868), the UK's first Civil Engineering professor, appointed in 1827
- Sir John O'Reilly, head of the Department of Electronic and Electrical Engineering (1997–2001)
- William Pole (1813–1900), 1859–76
- William Ramsay (1852–1916), chair of Chemistry (appointed 1887)
- H. E. Watson (1886–1980), Ramsay Memorial Professor of Chemical Engineering
- E. C. Williams, first Ramsay Memorial Professor of Chemical Engineering (1923–1927)

=== Interdisciplinary studies ===
- Carl Gombrich, founding programme director of the UCL Arts and Sciences programme and co-founder of the London Interdisciplinary School

=== Languages and literature ===
- Chimen Abramsky, emeritus professor of Hebrew and Jewish Studies
- Celia Britton, emeritus professor of French
- A. S. Byatt, senior lecturer in English and American Literature (1972–83); winner of the 1990 Booker Prize
- Sir Hermann Gollancz, professor of Hebrew; British rabbi (1902–24)
- Alan Hollinghurst, lecturer in English; deputy editor, The Times Literary Supplement; later winner of the 2004 Booker Prize
- A. E. Housman, professor of Latin; poet most famous as author of A Shropshire Lad
- Dan Jacobson, professor of English; author; winner of the prestigious Somerset Maugham Award
- Sir Frank Kermode, Lord Northcliffe Professor of Modern English Literature (1967–74); literary critic
- David Masson, professor of English literature; Scottish writer
- Karl Miller, Lord Northcliffe Professor of English Literature (1976–92); first editor, The London Review of Books
- Arnaldo Momigliano, professor of history (1951–75)
- Henry Morley, professor of English literature
- Dadabhai Naoroji, professor of Gujarati (1856–1865) credited as the first British Asian UK Member of Parliament, also known as the "Grand Old Man of India"
- Sir Anthony Panizzi , professor of Italian
- Stephen Spender , lecturer in English; Gresham Professor of Rhetoric; English poet
- John Sutherland, Emeritus Lord Northcliffe Professor of Modern English Literature; columnist for The Guardian
- Jeremy Treglown, professor of English; editor, The Times Literary Supplement; author
- D. P. Walker, reader in French, musicologist, composer (1945–61)
- Stanley Wells, emeritus professor of Shakespeare studies, chairman of the Shakespeare Birthplace Trust
- Moira Yip, professor of Linguistics

=== Mathematical, physical, and space sciences ===
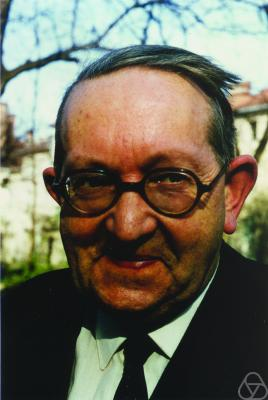
Harold Davenport

- Jim Al-Khalili, post-doctoral fellow
- Alan Baker (mathematics), winner of the 1970 Fields Medal
- William Henry Bragg, inventor of x-ray crystallography and Nobel laureate
- Jocelyn Bell Burnell (astronomy), discovered radio pulsars
- Charles Bungay Fawcett, professor of Geography
- Paul Cohn, Astor Professor of Mathematics
- Marianna Csörnyei, professor of mathematics
- Harold Davenport, Astor Professor of mathematics, number theory
- Philip Dawid, professor of statistics, president of the International Society for Bayesian Analysis
- Augustus DeMorgan, professor of mathematics, noted for his law of sets
- Michael J. B. Duff, professor of applied physics, computer scientist
- Sir Francis Galton, 'father of fingerprinting'
- Tim Gowers, professor of mathematics; winner of the 1998 Fields Medal
- Otto Hahn, pioneer of nuclear chemistry, discoverer of nuclear fusion and Nobel laureate
- Peter Higgs, theoretical physicist and Nobel laureate
- James Joseph Sylvester, professor of mathematics, algebra and matrix theory
- Norman Lloyd Johnson, reader in statistics
- Sir James Lighthill, lecturer; predecessor to Stephen Hawking as Lucasian Professor of Mathematics at Cambridge University
- Dennis Lindley, statistician
- Sir Harrie Massey, Goldsmid Professor of Applied Mathematics, world expert on atomic and molecular collisions
- Egon Pearson, professor of Statistics
- Karl Pearson, eugenicist, Goldsmid Professor of Applied Mathematics; founder of the Department of Applied Statistics
- Eugene Rabinowitch, worked in the Manhattan Project and co-founded the Bulletin of the Atomic Scientists
- Klaus F. Roth, professor of mathematics, winner of the 1958 Fields Medal
- Edward Teller, 'father of the hydrogen bomb'
- Patrick du Val
- Alfred North Whitehead, professor of Physics

=== Life sciences ===
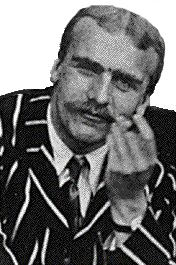
J. B. S. Haldane

- Caroline Austin, British molecular biologist
- Sir Thomas Barlow, royal physician known for his research on infantile scurvy (Barlow's disease)
- William Bayliss, physiologist who, along with his brother-in-law Ernest Starling, first discovered the existence and function of hormones while working at University College London
- Dame Carol Black, professor of rheumatology; national director for Health & Work; formerly president of the Royal College of Physicians
- Patricia H. Clarke née Greene, FRS (1919–2010), professor of microbial biochemistry
- David Clary, FRS, director of the UCL Centre for Theoretical and Computational Chemistry; chief scientific advisor, UK Foreign and Commonwealth Office, 2009–
- Alex Comfort, Faculty of Medicine; author of the seminal sex guide, The Joy of Sex
- Jack Drummond, biochemist known for his work on nutrition
- George Viner Ellis, prominent anatomist; studied medicine at UCL Medical School and later became a professor of anatomy
- Sir Martin Evans, Nobel Prize in Physiology or Medicine-winning biologist for his work with stem cells
- Lesley Fallowfield, professor of psycho-oncology (1997–2001)
- Suzi Gage, psychologist, science blogger
- C. Robin Ganellin, emeritus professor of medicinal chemistry, co-discoverer of cimetidine
- Andrew J Goldberg, clinical senior lecturer in orthopaedic surgery
- J. B. S. Haldane, professor of genetics (1933–57); one of the founders of population genetics
- Archibald Hill, professor of physiology (1922–51), winner of the 1922 Nobel Prize in Physiology or Medicine
- Victor Horsley, professor of clinical surgery, co-inventor of Horsley–Clarke apparatus
- Andrew Huxley, Nobel laureate
- Ian Jacobs, dean of Medicine
- Roland Levinsky, Hugh Greenwood Professor of Immunology
- Avrion Mitchison, professor of zoology
- Courtenay Norbury Experimental Psychologist, Developmental Psychology
- Santa Ono, GlaxoSmithKline Professor of Biomedical Sciences
- Richard Quain, chair of Anatomy (?–1850), having also studied medicine at UCL Medical School, and later physician-extraordinary to Queen Victoria
- Dunkinfield Henry Scott, botanist
- Anthony Segal, professor of medicine
- John Maynard-Smith, lecturer in zoology (1952–65)
- David Morley, professor of child health, a pioneer in child healthcare
- Bert Sakmann, Nobel Prize-winning cell physiologist and former researcher at UCL Department of Biophysics (1970–1973)
- Sir Edward Henry Sieveking, former physician extraordinary to King Edward VII
- Charles Spearman, professor of psychology; noted for Spearman's rank correlation coefficient
- Bernard Spilsbury, Britain's first forensic scientist
- Ernest Starling, physiologist, noted for the Frank–Starling law of the heart, producing the Starling equation, and discovery of hormones at UCL alongside his brother-in-law William Bayliss
- Patrick Wall, professor of neurophysiology, noted for the influential gate theory of pain with Ronald Melzack at McGill University
- David J Werring, professor of clinical neurology, noted for influential research in stroke
- Alexander Williamson, noted for the chemical synthesis of ether
- Lewis Wolpert, professor of biology
- John (JZ) Young, professor of anatomy

=== Philosophy ===
- A. J. Ayer, Grote Professor of the Philosophy of Mind and Logic (1946–59)
- Myles Burnyeat, lecturer in Philosophy
- Gerald Cohen, reader in Philosophy; later Chichele Professor of Social and Political Theory at Oxford University
- S.V. Keeling, lecturer and reader in philosophy, scholar of J. M. E. McTaggart and Descartes (after whom the annual Keeling lectures on Ancient Philosophy at UCL are named)
- Stuart Hampshire, Grote Professor of the Philosophy of Mind and Logic
- W. D. Hart
- Ted Honderich, emeritus Grote Professor of the Philosophy of Mind and Logic
- John Macmurray, Grote Professor of the Philosophy of Mind and Logic; BBC broadcaster
- Carveth Read, professor of moral philosophy
- Bernard Williams, lecturer in philosophy; later Knightbridge Professor of Philosophy at Cambridge University
- Richard Wollheim, Grote Professor of the Philosophy of Mind and Logic

=== Social sciences, geography, and history ===
- Diane Koenker, director of the School of Slavonic and East European Studies
- Michael Crawford, professor of ancient history
- Wendy Davies, professor of medieval Celtic history
- Romesh Chunder Dutt (রমেশচন্দ্র দত্ত), student and later professor of Indian history who translated the Ramayana and Mahabharata; president of the Indian National Congress in 1899
- John Connell, professor at University of Sydney (PhD 1973)
- G. E. M. de Ste. Croix, Marxist historian of Greek Antiquity, author of The Class Struggle in the Ancient Greek World
- Sir Andrew Dilnot, economist; principal, St. Hugh's College Oxford; Pro Vice-Chancellor, Oxford
- Dame Mary Douglas, professor of anthropology; noted for her Cultural Theory of Risk
- Hugh Gaitskell, lecturer in Political Economy (1928–1939), former leader of the Labour Party
- Georgina Herrmann, reader in the Archaeology of Western Asia (1994–2002)
- Albert Pollard, professor of constitutional history; major contributor to the Dictionary of National Biography
- Conrad Russell, professor of Early Modern British history
- Sir Eric Turner, professor of papyrology
- Paul Rosenstein-Rodan, taught economics at UCL, authored the "Big Push" Tteory, later assistant director of the Economic Department in the International Bank for Reconstruction and Development, 1947–1953
- Philip Wicksteed, economist and theologian

== Current staff ==
=== Art, architecture, and design ===
- Iain Borden
- David Burrows
- Susan Alexis Collins
- Melanie Counsell
- Peter Davies
- Tom Dyckhoff, broadcaster and teaching fellow at The Bartlett
- Simon Faithfull
- Murray Fraser
- Judith Goddard
- Dryden Goodwin
- Nadia Hebson
- Jonathan Hill
- C.J. Lim
- Lisa Milroy
- Jayne Parker
- Barbara Penner
- Sarah Pickering
- Jane Rendell
- Liz Rideal
- Jon Thomson
- Carey Young

=== Engineering sciences ===
- Polina Bayvel, professor of optical communications & networks
- Ann Blandford, professor of human-computer interaction
- Helen Czerski, research fellow in mechanical engineering
- George Danezis, professor of security and privacy engineering
- Mark Handley, professor of networked systems, computer science
- Zoe Laughlin, materials engineer and co-founder of the Institute of Making
- Paola Lettieri, professor of chemical engineering, director of UCL East
- Mark Miodownik, professor of materials & society, co-founder of the Institute of Making
- Peter O'Hearn, professor of computer science
- Michael Pepper, Pender Chair of Nanoelectronics (2009–)
- Yvonne Rogers, professor of Interaction Design and director of UCLIC
- Angela Sasse, professor of human-centred technology
- John Shawe-Taylor, director of the Centre for Computational Statistics
- Rebecca Shipley, professor of healthcare engineering
- David Silver, professor of computer science
- Eva Sorensen, 11th Ramsay Memorial Professor of Chemical Engineering
- Sarah Spurgeon, head of Department of Electronic and Electrical Engineering
- Jose L. Torero, head of the Department of Civil, Environmental and Geomatic Engineering

=== History, languages and literature ===
- Bas Aarts, professor of English Linguistics
- Rosemary Ashton, OBE, Quain Professor of English Language and Literature
- John Dickie, professor in Italian Studies
- John Fletcher, Laplanche scholar, literary theorist
- Mark Ford, professor of English
- Mary Fulbrook, professor of German history
- Julian Hoppit FBA, Astor Professor of British History
- Philip Horne, professor of English
- John Mullan, professor of English
- Matthew Sperling, associate professor of Creative and Critical Writing
- Li Wei, chair of applied linguistics and director of the UCL Centre for Applied Linguistics

=== Mathematical, physical and space sciences ===
- Tim Broyd, professor of built environment foresight and honorary professor of civil engineering
- Hannah Fry, Professor in the Mathematics of Cities at the UCL Centre for Advanced Spatial Analysis
- David Kemp, physicist at the UCL Ear Institute who discovered otoacoustic emission
- Alan Sokal, professor of mathematics
- Helen Wilson, professor of mathematics

=== Life sciences ===
- Peter Butler, professor of surgery
- David Colquhoun, notable for predicting the single Ion channel function, later verified by Bert Sakmann
- Martin Elliott, professor of paediatric cardiothoracic surgery
- Rob Horne, professor of behavioural medicine, School of Pharmacy
- Steve Jones, professor of genetics
- Nick Lane, Winner of the 2015 biochemical society award and influential science writer
- Sammy Lee, expert in in vitro fertilisation
- John O'Keefe, winner of the 2014 Nobel Prize in Physiology or Medicine
- Sarah Pett, professor of infectious diseases and COVID-19 researcher
- Janet Radcliffe-Richards, director, Centre for Biomedical Ethics and Philosophy
- Martin Raff, professor of zoology, former director of the Laboratory of Molecular Cell Biology
- Sarah Tabrizi, professor of neuroscience
- Klara Valko, honorary professor at University College London School of Pharmacy
- Robin Weiss, director of the Wohl Virus Research Centre, discovered that CD4 is the co-receptor for HIV
- Semir Zeki, professor of neurology, proponent for the role of Visual area 4 in cognitive colour construction

=== Social sciences, geography, and history ===
- John Adams, professor of geography and authority on risk compensation
- Richard Blundell, Ricardo Professor of Political Economy; director, Institute for Fiscal Studies
- Catherine Hall, professor of modern British social and cultural history
- Gordon Hillman, honorary visiting professor in archaeobotany (palaeoethnobotany)
- Simon Hornblower, Grote Professor of ancient history and editor of the Oxford Classical Dictionary
- Amélie Kuhrt, historian of the ancient Near East.
- Martyn Rady, professor of Central European history
- John Reid, chairman of the Institute for Security and Resilience Studies at UCL, member of UK Parliament
- Christopher Tilley, professor of anthropology and archaeology, a pioneer of the post-processual archaeology movement
- Mark Maslin, professor of Earth System Science
- David Wengrow, professor of comparative archeology

== Alumni ==
=== Academics ===
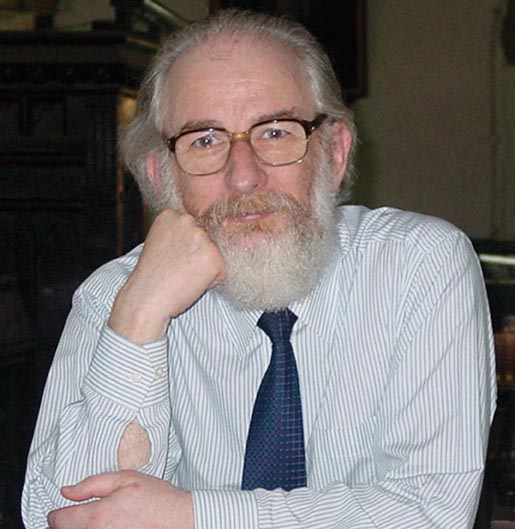
David Crystal

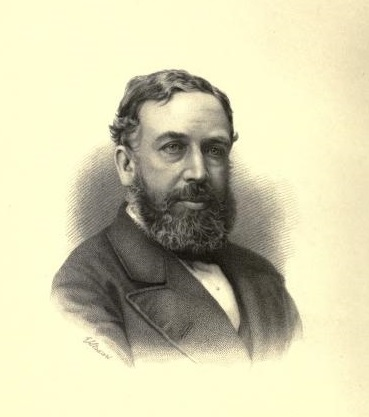
William Jevons

- Roy Clive Abraham (certificate in Anthropology, 1927), scholar of African languages
- Israel Abrahams (MA), Jewish scholar
- Sir Walter Adams (History and later lecturer), historian and former director of the London School of Economics
- Hutton Ayikwei Addy, professor of public health, first dean of the University for Development Studies Medical School
- Momtazuddin Ahmed (PhD Philosophy, 1937), Bangladeshi philosopher and academic
- Mark Allinson (PhD in German history), academic and historian of German history
- Ali M. Ansari (BA), historian and founder of the Institute for Iranian Studies
- Emmanuel Quaye Archampong, emeritus professor of surgery at the University of Ghana
- Robert Arnott, medical archaeologist
- John Baker, UCL (LLB, PhD): Downing Professor of the Laws of England, University of Cambridge
- Trevor J. Barnes, professor of Economic Geography at the University of British Columbia
- Peter Birks, former Regius Professor of Civil Law, University of Oxford
- Tengku Muhammad Fa-iz Petra (MA Ancient History and MPhil/PhD History), Kelantan Royal Family
- Edith Clara Batho (English, 1915), principal of Royal Holloway College
- Arthur Blok, first administrative head of the Technion – Israel Institute of Technology
- Bernard Crick, British political theorist
- David Crystal, professor emeritus, UWB, prominent linguist
- Stephen Daniels (PhD), professor of cultural geography at University of Nottingham
- Stephen Guest, professor of legal philosophy, UCL
- Noreena Hertz, associate director, Judge Business School at Cambridge University
- David Gwilym James, vice-chancellor University of Southampton 1952–1965
- Eleanor Janega (PhD), American mediaeval historian, author and broadcaster
- William Jevons, professor of political economy, UCL
- Timothy L. Killeen (BSc, PhD), president of the University of Illinois system
- R.J.B. Knight, naval historian
- Marc Tessier-Lavigne (president of Stanford University);
- Victoria Lemieux, associate professor at University of British Columbia
- David Llewellyn, vice-chancellor of Harper Adams University
- Julie Maxton, registrar at Oxford University
- Lillian Penson, first woman vice-chancellor of London University
- Chung-Kwong Poon (潘宗光), GBS, JP, president of The Hong Kong Polytechnic University since 1991
- Henry Enfield Roscoe, former vice-chancellor of the University of London (1896–1902)
- Lord Randolph Quirk, Quain Professor of English Literature
- Stefan Reif, studentship, later professor of Hebrew at the University of Cambridge
- William Scoresby Routledge (medicine), ethnographer
- Sir Adrian Smith (UCL Mathematics, PhD), FRS, vice-chancellor of the University of London, 2012-
- Jonathan Wolff (MPhil), professor of philosophy and dean of the Faculty of Arts and Humanities at UCL
- Nicholas Bloom (PhD economics), William Eberle Professor in the Department of Economics at Stanford University; courtesy professor at Stanford Business School and Stanford Institute for Economic Policy Research; co-director of the Productivity, Innovation and Entrepreneurship Program at the National Bureau of Economic Research
- Lorraine Dearden (PhD economics), professor of economics and social statistics at the Department of Social Science of the Institute of Education, University College London
- Noreena Hertz (BA philosophy and economics), academic, economist and author; honorary professor at the UCL Institute for Global Prosperity at University College London; Sirius XM's chief Europe correspondent and ITV News economics editor
- Sandra McNally (PhD economics and MSc in environmental and resource economics), economist and professor of economics at the University of Surrey and the Centre for Economic Performance (CEP), at the London School of Economics and Political Science
- Benjamin Moll (BSc economics), macroeconomist and professor of economics at the London School of Economics and Political Science
- John Pencavel (BSs and MSc economics), economist and professor of economics (emeritus) at Stanford University
- John Van Reenen (PhD economics), Ronald Coase School Professor and director of the Centre for Economic Performance at the London School of Economics and Political Science
- Lady Mary Wellesley, historian and author

==== Economists ====
- Edith Abbott (Carnegie Scholarship), American economist, social reformer, academic and author; first woman to become a dean of an American graduate school, at the University of Chicago
- Sophia N. Antonopoulou (PhD Economics), economist and academic
- Süleyman Başak (BSc Civil Engineering), financial economist
- Ian Crawford (PhD Economics), economist and academic
- William Stanley Jevons (BA and MA Chemistry and Botany), economist and logician
- Barbara Sianesi (PhD Economics), economist, senior research economist at the Institute for Fiscal Studies in London

==== Engineers ====
- Kevin Ashton, Internet of Things pioneer
- William Edward Ayrton, co-developer of the first spiral-spring ammeter, wattmeter and electric tricycle
- Ronald Hugh Barker, physicist, mathematician and pioneer of digital control engineering known primarily for inventing Barker code
- Harold Barlow, engineer and UCL academic
- Arnold Beck, professor of engineering, University of Cambridge
- Alexander Graham Bell, inventor of telephone (1868–1870; dropped out without completing studies)
- Ian McDonald Campbell, civil engineer and vice-chairman of British Rail
- Colin Chapman, Formula One designer and founder of Lotus Cars
- Edgar Claxton, part of the 1960s team which electrified sections of the British mainline railway network
- Demetrius Comino OBE, engineer, inventor of Dexion steel slotted angle system
- Edward Dobson (1816/17?–1908), provincial engineer for the Canterbury Province in New Zealand
- John Ambrose Fleming, inventor of thermionic valve and diode
- Patrick Head, co-founder of the Williams Formula One team
- Oliver Lodge, involved in the development of wireless telegraph
- Colin Robbins, software engineer, co-inventor of LDAP
- Bruce Woodgate, principal investigator and designer of the Space Telescope Imaging Spectrograph on the Hubble Space Telescope

==== Life scientists and medics ====
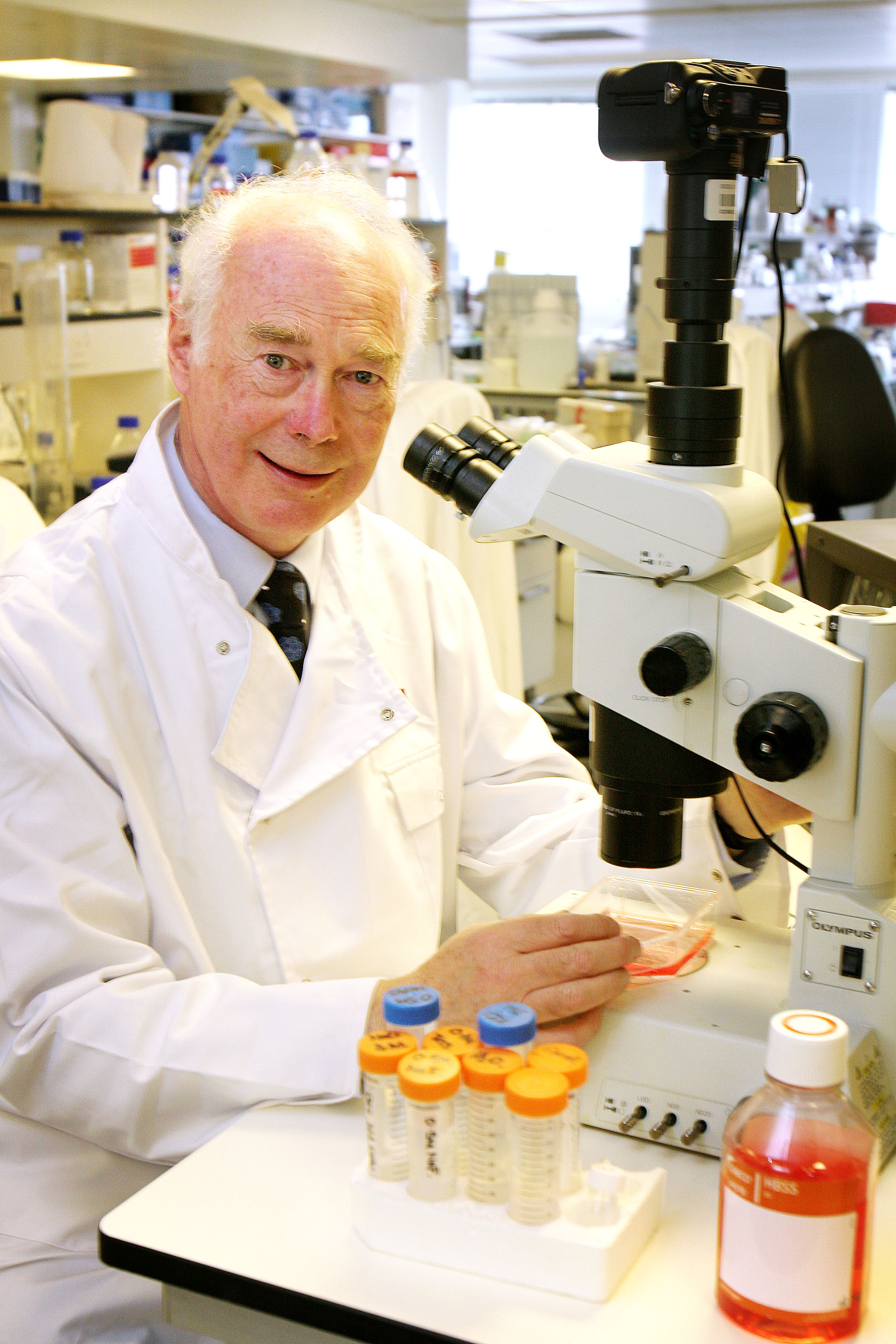
Sir Martin Evans shared the 2007 Nobel Prize in Physiology or Medicine after discovering a method for introducing homologous recombination in mice employing embryonic stem cells

- Sir (Ernest) Donald Acheson, chief medical officer and chief medical adviser to H.M. Government 1983–91
- Agnes Arber (BSc, DSc, 1905), botanist
- Judy Armitage (PhD, 1976), professor of molecular and cellular biochemistry at the University of Oxford
- Tipu Aziz (Neurophysiology), professor of neurosurgery and neurophysiology
- Alan Baddeley, psychologist known for his work on working memory, including his multiple components model
- Edward Ballard (medicine), physician and social commentator on living conditions in Victorian Britain
- Alec Bangham (medicine), biophysicist researching liposomes and inventing clinically useful artificial lung surfactants
- Erasmus Darwin Barlow, psychiatrist, physiologist and businessman
- Sir Thomas Barlow (medicine), British royal physician known for his research on infantile scurvy (Barlow's disease)
- Dame Josephine Barnes (medicine), obstetrician and gynaecologist
- Ann Barrett, emeritus professor of oncology at the University of East Anglia
- Allon Barsam, ophthalmologist and medical researcher, who pioneered the use of microwave keratoplasty in humans
- Herbert Barrie, neonatologist
- Anne Beloff-Chain, biochemist
- Margaret Jane Benson (1859–1936), paleobotanist
- Alfred William Bennett (1833–1902), British botanist and publisher of The Friend
- Katie Bentley, computer scientist, builds computational software to understand communication between cells
- Brenda Bigland-Ritchie (1927–2019), physiologist and biomechanist
- Wilfred Bion, psychoanalyst
- Charles Bolton (MD), physician and pathologist
- Nigel Bonner, ecologist and zoologist
- John Bowlby (medicine), psychologist, psychiatrist, pioneer of attachment theory
- Karim Brohi (BSc computer science, MB BS medicine), surgeon, international trauma science expert, and academic
- Michael Brown, director of Army Medicine and former physician to the Queen
- Sir Cyril Lodowic Burt FBA (1883–1971), professor and chair of Psychology (1931–51), pioneering child psychologist, now discredited
- Walter Carr (BS MD), physician and surgeon
- William Carpenter, physician, invertebrate zoologist and physiologist
- Dame June Clark Emeritus Professor of Community Nursing, University of Wales, Swansea
- Oscar Clayton, surgeon
- G. Marius Clore FMedSci, FRS (Biochemistry, UCL, 1976; Medicine, University College Medical School, 1979), biophysicist and structural biologist; pioneer of multidimensional macromolecular NMR spectroscopy laying foundations of 3D structure determination of proteins in solution; member of the United States National Academy of Sciences
- Archie Cochrane, epidemiologist, professor of tuberculosis and chest diseases, Welsh National School of Medicine, pioneer of evidence-based medicine
- Sir Philip Cohen (BSc, PhD, 1969), Royal Medal-winning biochemist
- Leslie Collier, virologist who helped to create the first heat stable smallpox vaccine key in the eventual eradication of the disease
- Edward Treacher Collins, ophthalmologist and first described Treacher Collins Syndrome
- Francis Crick, co-discoverer of the structure of DNA; Nobel laureate
- Henry Radcliffe Crocker, dermatologist
- Jane Dacre (medicine), president of the Royal College of Physicians (2014–incumbent)
- Viscount Bertrand Dawson, doctor to the British Royal Family
- Deborah Doniach, leading expert on auto-immune diseases
- George Viner Ellis (medicine and later professor of anatomy), prominent anatomist
- Sir John Erichsen (medicine and later lecturer), prominent surgeon and surgeon-extraordinary to Queen Victoria
- Sir Martin Evans (PhD, 1969, and later lecturer), winner of the 2007 Nobel Prize in Physiology or Medicine
- Jeremy Farrar (BSc, MBBS), director of the Wellcome Trust from 2014
- Sir William Henry Flower (MB), comparative anatomist and 2nd director of the Natural History Museum, London
- William Tilbury Fox, dermatologist
- Eva Frommer, fellow of the Royal College of Psychiatrists, child psychiatrist and pioneer of arts therapies in hospital for children
- Paul Garner, physician, epidemiologist, public health professional, and medical academic
- Clare Gerada (medicine), former chair of the Royal College of General Practitioners (2010–13)
- Ben Goldacre (MB BS), academic and science writer
- Andrew J Goldberg, clinical senior lecturer in orthopaedic surgery and consultant orthopaedic surgeon
- Gillian Griffiths, cell biologist and immunologist
- Rainer Guillery, emeritus professor of anatomy, University of Wisconsin Medical School; formerly Dr Lee's professor of Human Anatomy, University of Oxford
- Anita Harding, neurologist who co-authored the first paper which identified pathogenic mitochondrial DNA mutation in human disease (in Kearn-Sayre syndrome)
- Colleen Higgins, professor of molecular genetics in New Zealand
- John Ivor Pulsford James, known as J.I.P. James, president and honorary fellow of the British Orthopaedic Association
- Allan Octavian Hume (medicine), political reformer, ornithologist and botanist, one of the founders of the Indian National Congress
- Donald Jeffries, virologist, expert on HIV
- Sir William Jenner, first doctor to identify between typhus and typhoid
- Christian Jessen, medical doctor and television presenter best known Embarrassing Bodies
- Ralph Kekwick, biochemist
- Edwin Lankester, founder of the Quarterly Journal of Microscopical Science (QJMS)
- Thomas Lewis (MB BS), cardiologist
- Joseph Lister, 1st Baron Lister, pioneer in the use of antiseptics in surgery
- Barbara Low, founder member of the British Psychoanalytical Society
- Kalman Mann (MB BS), Israeli physician, 8th director general of Hadassah Medical Organization
- Barrie Marmion, microbiologist
- Henry Marsh (medicine), neurosurgeon
- Clare Marx (MB BS), first woman to be president of the Royal College of Surgeons of England
- John Maynard-Smith, theoretical evolutionary biologist and geneticist
- Jan McLelland (medicine), dermatologist and medical researcher
- Max Pemberton, medical doctor, author and journalist
- Raj Persaud, consultant psychiatrist in general adult and community psychiatry, Bethlem Royal & Maudsley Teaching Hospitals and clinical tutor to Bethlem & Maudsley senior house officers, since 1994
- Sir Richard Powell (medicine), physician and Physician Royal to Queen Victoria, King Edward VII and King George V
- Richard Quain (medicine, 1840, and later chair of anatomy), physician who also served as physician-extraordinary to Queen Victoria
- Cornelius Odarquaye Quarcoopome, Pioneer ophthalmologist in Ghana
- Sir Philip Randle, professor of clinical biochemistry, University of Oxford since 1975
- Bernard Ribeiro, Baron Ribeiro, former president of the Royal College of Surgeons of England (2005–08)
- Sydney Ringer (MB), British clinician, physiologist and pharmacologist, best known for inventing Ringer's solution
- Rosemary Rue, physician and civil servant
- Sir Edward Sharpey-Schafer, physiologist
- Elizabeth Joan Stokes (MB BS), clinical bacteriologist
- Sir Rodney Sweetnam, president, Royal College of Surgeons of England, 1995–98; formerly orthopaedic surgeon to The Middlesex and University College Hospitals 1960–92; orthopaedic surgeon to The Queen 1982–92
- Susan Swindells (MB BS), infectious disease expert, AIDS researcher, scientist laureate at the University of Nebraska Medical Center, and member of the NIH COVID-19 Treatments Guidelines Panel
- Hugh Owen Thomas, father of orthopaedic surgery in Britain
- Richard Turner-Warwick, formerly Senior Surgeon and Urologist to The Middlesex and St Peters Hospitals and Hunterian professor Royal College of Surgeons
- Dame Margaret Turner-Warwick, President, Royal College of Physicians 1989–92
- Ethel Vaughan-Sawyer, gynaecological surgeon
- Kenneth Walton, pathologist
- Raphael Weldon (medicine, left 1877), evolutionary biologist and a founder of biometry
- W. Roger Williams, pathologist, surgeon, cancer researcher and medical writer
- Dame Albertine Winner (BSc, MB BS, Maryland), physician and medical administrator
- R. A. Young (MB MD), physician and tuberculosis specialist

==== Mathematicians and physical scientists ====
- Alan Baker, winner of the 1970 Fields Medal
- D.J. Bartholomew (BSc, PhD Mathematics), statistician and President of the Royal Statistical Society (1993–1995)
- Laurence Baxter, professor of statistics
- Sir Jagadish Chandra Bose, one of the founders of radio telecommunication
- George E. P. Box (1919–2013) (mathematics and statistics, PhD, 1953), Vilas Research Professor of Statistics, University of Wisconsin–Madison
- Margaret Burbidge, astrophysicist, former American Astronomical Society President, former Royal Greenwich Observatory Director, one of the founders of stellar nucleosynthesis and first author of the influential B^{2}FH paper),
- Ian Crawford, professor of Planetary Science and Astrobiology, Birkbeck University of London
- Florence Nightingale David (1909–1993), statistician
- Roland Dobbs, physicist
- Israel Dostrovsky, Israeli physical chemist and fifth president of the Weizmann Institute of Science
- Thomas Eckersley, theoretical physicist and expert in radio waves
- Thomas Elger, selenographer famous for his lunar map
- Hans Eysenck, psychologist who created the modern scientific theory of personality
- Ambrose Fleming, inventor of the vacuum tube
- John Fox, statistician
- Cecilie French, chemist specialising in magnetochemistry
- William Gowers, winner of the 1998 Fields Medal
- Jaroslav Heyrovský, father of the electroanalytical method
- Cyril Hilsum, pioneer of liquid crystal materials and devices, development of flat screen devices
- Hermann Arthur Jahn, chemist, with Edward Teller he identified the Jahn–Teller effect
- David C. Jewitt, co-discoverer of the Kuiper belt
- Norman Lloyd Johnson, professor of statistics and author
- Charles Kuen Kao, pioneer of the use of fibre optics in telecommunications; Nobel laureate
- Chris Lintott, professor of astrophysics at Oxford
- Kathleen Lonsdale, discovered the structure of benzene
- Christine E. Morris, archaeologist
- Hamid Naderi Yeganeh, mathematician and mathematical artist
- Jerzy Neyman, Polish mathematician and statistician that first introduced the modern concept of a confidence interval into statistical hypothesis testing and co-revised Ronald Fisher's null hypothesis testing
- Freda Nkirote, director of the British Institute in Eastern Africa and president of the Pan-African Archaeological Association
- Sir Roger Penrose, mathematician and Emeritus Rouse Ball Professor of mathematics at Oxford, winner of the 2020 Nobel Prize in Physics
- Suzanna Randall, astrophysicist and private astronaut candidate
- Hans Reck, volcanologist and paleontologist
- Owen Willans Richardson, physicist, winner of the 1928 Nobel Prize in Physics
- Klaus Roth, mathematician, winner of the 1958 Fields Medal
- Walter Rouse-Ball, mathematician

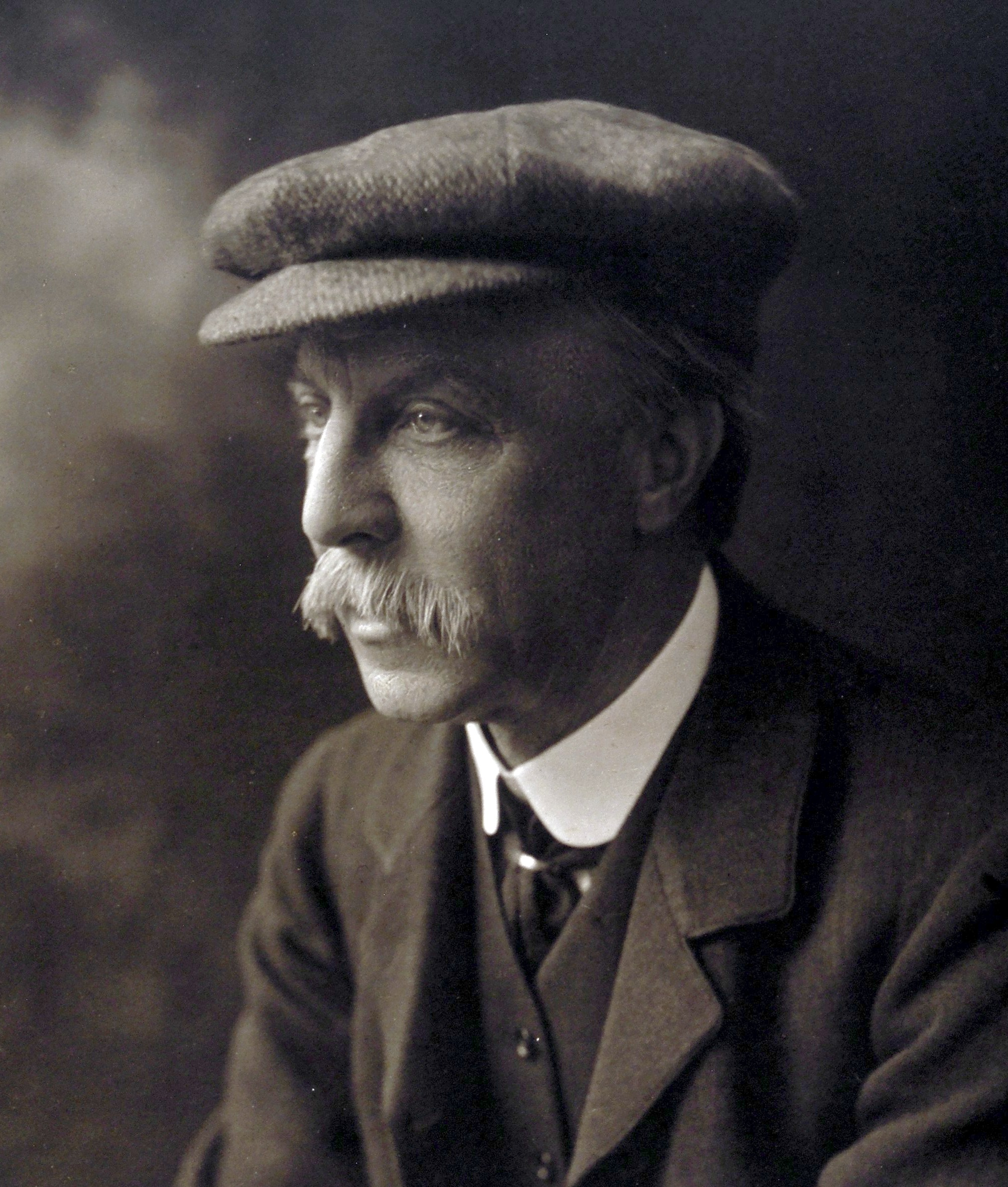
Sir Edward Sharpey-Schafter is regarded as the founder of endocrinology

- R.J.G. Savage (PhD Paleontology), palaeontologist known as Britain's leading expert on fossil mammals
- M. J. Seaton, British mathematician, atomic physicist and astronomer
- Sarah Semple, British archaeologist
- Ian Sloan, Australian applied mathematician
- Kirstine Smith, statistician, creator of optimal design of experiments
- David Spiegelhalter, statistician, professor at Cambridge
- Russell Stannard, professor emeritus of physics at the Open University, winner of the 1999 Bragg Medal
- Tan Tin Wee (陈定炜), Singaporean scientist, 2012 Inaugural Internet Hall of Fame, inventor of Internationalized Domain Names (IDN) (1998), bioinformatics pioneer in Asia, director of National Supercomputing Centre Singapore
- Percy White (Chemical Engineering), British chemist and nuclear scientist
- Andrew B. Wittkower, physicist
- Heinz Wolff, scientist, television and radio presenter

=== Architects, artists, and designers ===
- Corinne Bennett (Bartlett, 1957), conservation architect
- David Bomberg (1890–1957), Slade School of Fine Art (1913)
- Teresa Borsuk (Bartlett, 1981), architect
- Martin John Callanan
- Dora Carrington
- Ethel Charles and Bessie Charles, the first women to be admitted to RIBA (only allowed to audit classes at UCL as women were not permitted to officially enroll in architecture in the 1890s)
- Sir William Coldstream
- Martin Creed, conceptual artist; winner of the 2001 Turner Prize
- Robert Erskine (Slade 1978) sculptor, designer, automotive broadcaster, winner of the 1994 International Sir Otto Beit Award For Public Sculpture Excellence
- James Stevens Curl (History of Art), architectural historian, conservation consultant and critic
- Antony Gormley, sculptor; winner of the 1994 Turner Prize; creator of the Angel of the North
- Eileen Gray (Slade, 1898), lacquer artist and furniture designer
- Augustus John, painter
- Gerry Judah (Slade, 1977), artist, sculptor and designer
- Sir Osbert Lancaster, cartoonist, author, critic
- Gertrude Leverkus (B.A., 1919), architect
- Wyndham Lewis, co-founder of the Vorticist movement (dropped out without completing course)
- Arthur Ling
- David Mlinaric, architect, interior designer
- Evelyn De Morgan (Slade, 1877), painter
- Ben Nicholson, abstract painter
- Sir Eduardo Paolozzi, sculptor and artist
- Stuart Pearson Wright, painter
- Monica Pidgeon, interior designer and journalist
- Patricio Pouchulu, architect and academic
- Paula Rego, painter (Slade, 1952–56)
- Ibrahim el-Salahi, artist and painter
- Jenny Saville, prominent Young British Artist
- Sir Stanley Spencer, painter
- Sir John Summerson, leading British architectural historian and Slade Professor of Fine Art at the University of Oxford (1958–59)
- Tomoko Takahashi, installation artist; shortlisted for the 2000 Turner Prize
- Rachel Whiteread, sculptor; winner of the 1993 Turner Prize
- Sir Rex Whistler, artist, designer and illustrator
- Sir Colin St John Wilson (Architecture, 1949), architect, lecturer and author; spent over 30 years progressing the project to build a new British Library in London

=== Banking, business and commercial figures ===
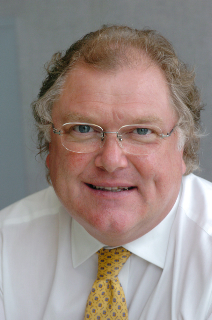
Prominent UK businessman Digby Jones served as a government minister under UK Prime Minister Gordon Brown.

- Andreas Antonopoulos (Computer Science), technology entrepreneur
- Nkiru Balonwu, CEO of Spinlet
- Sara Berkai, social enterprise founder and STEM educator, attended the Widening Participation scheme's "Computer Science Summer School" and studied Information Management for Business
- Dominic Blakemore (French), CEO of Compass Group
- Richard Brown (MPhil Town and Transport Planning), current chairman of Eurostar International and former chief executive of Eurostar UK
- Alex Chesterman (BSc Economics), co-founder of ScreenSelect, which later became part of online film distributor LoveFilm; founder and CEO of online used car platform Cazoo
- Shou Zi Chew, CEO of TikTok
- Paul Donovan, current CEO of Odeon UCI Cinemas Group and former CEO of Vodafone Ireland and eircom
- Lewis Evans, scientific instrument collector and businessman
- Demis Hassabis, co-founder and CEO of DeepMind
- Lord Digby Jones (LLB), former director-general of the Confederation of British Industry and minister of state for trade and investment
- John Kenny, BSc, founder and chairman, JKX Oil and Gas, since 1992
- Ian Luder, taxation specialist, and lord mayor of the City of London 2008–2009
- Roger Lyons, joint general secretary, AMICUS since 2001; president, Trades Union Congress, 2003–04
- Susan Ma, managing director of Tropic Skin Care; finalist on The Apprentice series seven (2011)
- Richard Martell, creator of the controversial social network "FitFinder"
- Farhad Moshiri, part owner of Everton F.C.
- David E. I. Pyott, CEO of Allergan
- Sara Rashid, president of Kurdistan Save the Children
- Ceawlin Thynn, Viscount Weymouth, Longleat Enterprises
- Roger Tomlinson, founder of Geographic Information Systems; president, Tomlinson Associates Ltd, Consulting Geographers
- Marjorie Wallace, Countess Skarbek, chief executive, SANE, since 1990
- Edwin Waterhouse, founding partner of PricewaterhouseCoopers
- Dame Sharon White (MSc Econometrics), chair of the John Lewis Partnership; former chief executive of Ofcom
- Peter Williams, CEO of the clothing brand Jack Wills

=== Government and public officials, heads of state and politicians ===
Sir Stafford Cripps (left) attempted to negotiate with fellow UCL alumnus Mahatma Gandhi for full Indian support of the British war effort in World War II during his 1942 "Cripps mission".

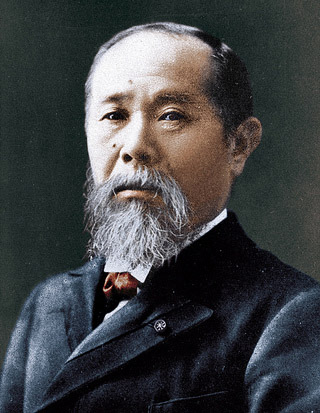
Hirobumi Itō drafted Imperial Japan's first constitution.

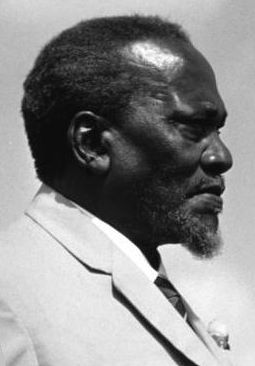
Jomo Kenyatta oversaw the creation of Kenya's public institutions after independence from the United Kingdom.

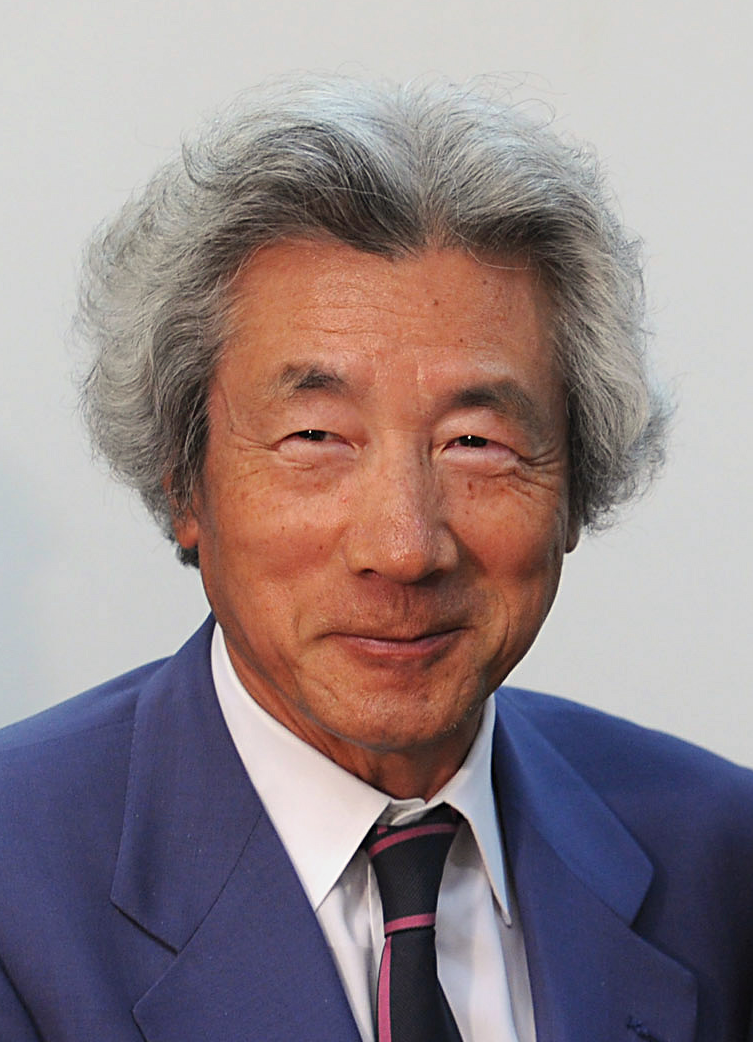
Junichiro Koizumi was the longest-serving prime minister of Japan since 1972.

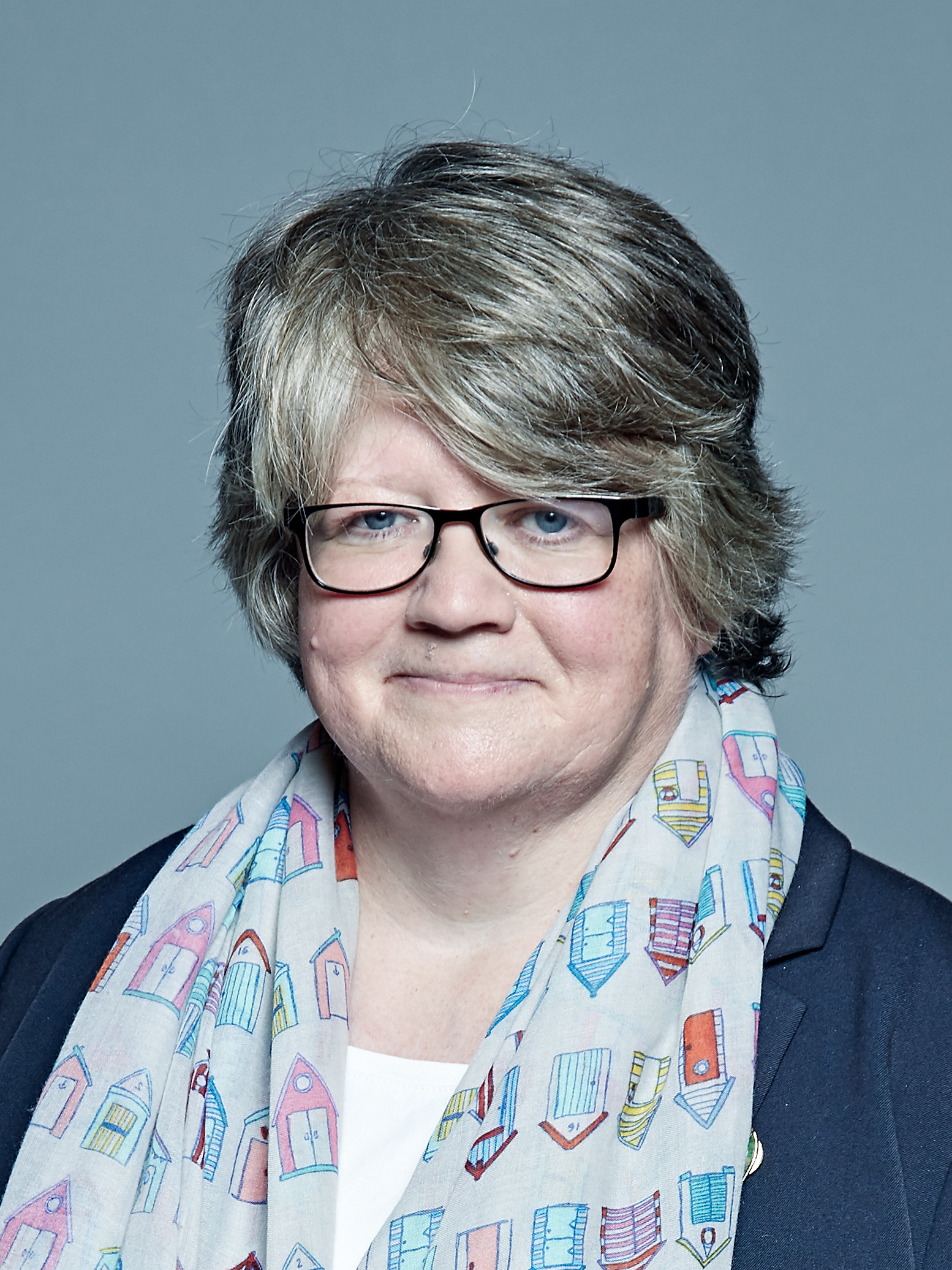
Thérèse Coffey became the first female deputy prime minister of the United Kingdom in 2022.

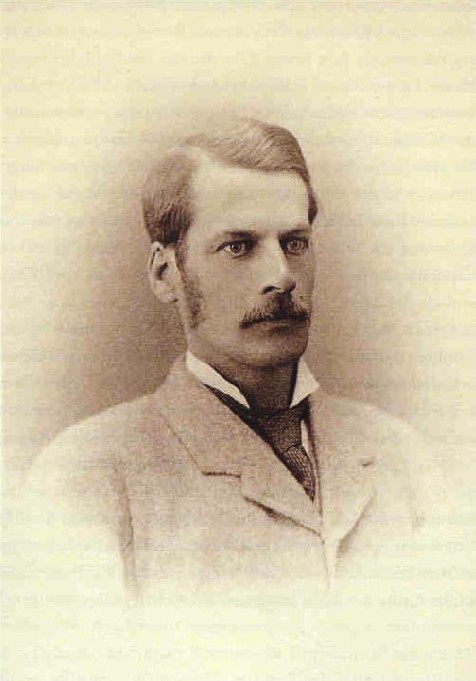
Sir Ernest Satow has been described as the first Englishman to become fluent in both written and spoken Japanese.

Many prominent politicians in the UK and abroad have studied at UCL. Notable alumni include the "Father of the Nation" of each of India, Kenya and Mauritius, the founders of Ghana, modern Japan and Nigeria, among others.

==== Heads of state and heads of government ====
- Nicos Anastasiades (Shipping Law), former president of Cyprus (2013–23)
- Sir Ellis Clarke (LLB), governor-general then first president of Trinidad and Tobago (1972–1987)
- Chaim Herzog (חיים הרצוג) (LLB), sixth president of Israel (1983–1993)
- Hirobumi Itō (伊藤 博文) (one of the "Chōshū Five"), first prime minister of Imperial Japan (1885–1888, 1892–1896, 1898, 1900–1901), known as the 'father of the Japanese Constitution', having drafted the 1890 Meiji Constitution of the Imperial Japan
- Jomo Kenyatta, considered the "Founding Father" of Kenya, first prime minister, then president of Kenya (1963–1978)
- Benedicto Kiwanuka (LLB, 1956), chief minister of the Uganda Protectorate, 1961–1962, first prime minister of Uganda, 1962, Chief Justice of Uganda, 1971–72
- Junichiro Koizumi (小泉 純一郎) (Economics, 1969), former prime minister of Japan (2001–2006)
- Sir Charles Lilley (Law), premier of Queensland (1868–1870), attended UCL for two years then dropped out
- Kwame Nkrumah (Philosophy), considered the 'father of African Nationalism', first prime minister of the Gold Coast, then first prime minister and then first president of Ghana (1952–1966)
- Sir Seewoosagur Ramgoolam, considered the "Founding Father" of Mauritius, chief minister of British Mauritius, then first prime minister (1961–1982) and then governor-general of Mauritius (1983–1985)
- Sir Bernard St. John, former prime minister of Barbados (1985–1986)

==== Heads of intergovernmental organisations ====
- Angie Brooks (International Law, 1953), first African woman president of the United Nations General Assembly (24th Session, 1969–1970) and the second woman to head the United Nations
- Terry Davis (LLB, 1962), former secretary general of the Council of Europe (2004–2009)
- Baroness Patricia Scotland (LLB), current secretary general of the Commonwealth of Nations (2016–) and former attorney general for England and Wales (2007–2010)

==== Other politicians, campaigners and public officials ====
- William Kwasi Aboah (LLM), Ghanaian politician and former interior minister
- Aliza Ayaz, world's youngest United Nations goodwill ambassador and leader of the campaign for UCL to divest from fossil fuels
- Kwame Addo-Kufuor (medicine), former minister for the interior and minister for defence of Ghana
- Sir Ryland Adkins (BA), former UK Liberal Party politician
- Solomon Adler (Economics), identified Soviet spy and economist at the US Treasury Department
- Richard Alexander (LLB), former UK Conservative Party politician
- Ghazi Abdul Rahman Algosaibi (غازي بن عبدالرحمن القصيبي) (PhD Law, 1970), former Saudi Arabian ambassador to Great Britain and minister for labor
- Sir Alex Allan (MSc Statistics, 1973), former chairman of the UK Joint Intelligence Committee
- Heidi Allen (Astrophysics), UK Conservative Party politician
- Baroness Ros Altmann (Economics and later lecturer), UK pensions expert and former government minister
- Peter Archer (LLB), former UK Labour Party politician and solicitor general for England and Wales
- Edward Aveling (BSc Zoology, 1870), prominent UK socialist and founding member of the UK Socialist League and Independent Labour Party
- Barbara Ayrton-Gould, former UK Labour Party politician
- Baey Yam Keng (MSc, Economic Development Board scholarship), Singaporean People's Action Party politician
- Alan Baker (אלן בייקר) (LLB, 1969), international law expert and former Israeli ambassador to Canada
- Robin Baker (BA), former deputy director-general of The British Council and vice-chancellor of Canterbury Christ Church University
- Millie Banerjee (BSc Zoology), public official and current chairman of the British Transport Police Authority
- Sir Thomas Barclay, former UK Liberal Party politician, economic and international law expert and head of the British Chamber of Commerce
- Sir William Barton, former British government official and diplomat of the Indian Political Service
- Evangelos Bassiakos (LLM), former Greek politician who served as government minister and MP of New Democracy
- Sir Elliott Belgrave (LLB), former governor-general of Barbados (2012–2017) (acting 2011–2012)
- Joy Belmonte (MA in archaeology), Filipino politician, mayor of Quezon City, former vice mayor of Quezon City
- James Berry (LLB), UK Conservative Party politician
- Baroness Jane Bonham-Carter, UK Liberal Democrat Party politician
- Martin Bourke (BA, 1969), governor of the Turks and Caicos Islands (1993–1996)
- John Albert Bright (BSc, 1867), former Liberal Unionist Party and UK Liberal Party politician
- Lord Richard Briginshaw (diploma), former general secretary of NATSOPA and trade unionist
- Rudranath Capildeo (BSc, MSc, PhD Mathematical Physics, 1948, and later lecturer), former leader of the opposition in the Parliament of Trinidad and Tobago and leader of the Democratic Labour Party of Trinidad and Tobago
- Tao-fan Chang (張道藩) (Fine Art), former president of the Legislative Yuan of the Republic of China
- Tien-Hsi Cheng (鄭天錫) (LLB, LLD, 1915), former Chinese politician, World Court judge and the last ambassador of the Republic of China to the UK before the creation of the People's Republic of China; first Chinese student to gain a doctorate in law from a British university
- Thérèse Coffey (BSc, PhD Chemistry), UK Conservative Party politician and UK deputy prime minister
- Arthur Cohen, former UK Liberal Party politician and barrister
- Sir Arthur Colegate, former UK Conservative Party politician
- Petrus "Papo" Compton (LLM), former minister of foreign and external affairs of Saint Lucia
- Edward Rider Cook (Chemistry), former UK Liberal Party politician
- Sir Daniel Cooper, 1st Baronet, first Speaker of the New South Wales Legislative Assembly and first president of the Royal Philatelic Society London
- Freda Corbet, former UK Labour Party politician
- George Courtauld, former UK Conservative Party politician
- Sir Stafford Cripps (Chemistry), former UK Chancellor of the Exchequer
- Charles Crompton, former UK Liberal Party politician and barrister
- Valerie Davey (PGCE, 1963), former UK Labour Party politician
- Bryan Davies (BA History, PGCE, 1962), UK Labour Party politician
- Geoffrey Dear (LLB, 1962), former Her Majesty's Chief Inspector of Constabulary for England and Wales
- Madan Lal Dhingra, Indian revolutionary and pro-independence activist, executed before completing studies
- Margareta Dovgal, Canadian politician, MLA for Vancouver-Yaletown
- Baroness Frances D'Souza (BSc Anthropology, 1970), second lord speaker of the UK House of Lords and scientist
- Evan Durbin (Economics, Ricardo Scholarship, 1930?), former UK Labour Party politician
- Kinsuke Endō (遠藤 謹助) (one of the "Chōshū Five"), regarded as the 'father of the modern Japanese mint’ as former head of the Imperial Japanese Mint
- Baroness Shreela Flather, first Asian woman member of the UK House of Lords
- Vincent Floissac (LLB), former president of the Saint Lucian Senate, acting governor-general of Saint Lucia (1987–1988)
- Mahatma Gandhi (મોહનદાસ કરમચંદ), leader of the Indian Independence Movement, took English classes with Henry Morley at UCL in 1888–89
- Lord Peter Goldsmith (LLM), former attorney general for England and Wales and Northern Ireland
- Lord Arnold Goodman (LLB), former lawyer, former chairman of the Arts Council of Great Britain and political advisor to politicians including Harold Wilson
- Rupert Harrison, former chief of staff to UK Chancellor of the Exchequer George Osborne (2006–2015)
- Lord Garry Hart, former special adviser to the UK lord chancellor
- Lord Farrer Herschell (BA, 1857), former UK lord chancellor
- Lin Homer (LLB), former chief executive of UK HM Revenue and Customs
- Bola Ige (LLB, 1959), former attorney general and minister of justice of Nigeria (2000–2001)
- Annuar Musa, former minister of Youth and Sport of Malaysia (1990–1993), former minister of Rural Development (1993–1999), former minister of Federal Territories (2020–2021), Minister of Communications and Multimedia (2021–)
- Khairy Jamaluddin (MA Legal and Political Theory, 1998), former minister of youth and sport of Malaysia (2013–2018), former minister of science, technology & innovation (2020–2021), minister of health (2021–)
- "J.B." Jeyaretnam (LLB), former leader of the Workers' Party of Singapore and Secretary-general of the Reform Party
- David Jones (LLB), UK Conservative Party politician and government minister, former secretary of state for Wales
- Helen Jones (BA), UK Labour Party politician
- Kaoru Inoue (井上 馨) (one of the "Chōshū Five"), first foreign minister of Imperial Japan credited as the 'father of modern Japanese diplomacy'
- Masaru Inoue (井上 勝) (Civil engineering and mining, as one of the "Chōshū Five"), credited as 'the Father of the Japanese railway' having been the first director of the Railway Board of Imperial Japan
- Philip, Hereditary Prince of Yugoslavia (BA)
- James Kitson (Chemistry and Natural Sciences), former president of the UK Liberal Party and first Lord Mayor of Leeds
- Sylvia Lim (LLM, 1989), chairman of the Workers' Party of Singapore
- Ian Luder (BA Economics and Economic History), UK tax expert and former lord mayor of the City of London
- Sir Nicholas Macpherson, Permanent Secretary to the UK Treasury
- Stavros Malas (BSc, PhD Genetics), former minister of health of Cyprus and Progressive Party of Working People (AKEL) politician
- Augustus Margary, former UK diplomat, and whose murder caused the 1875 "Margary Affair"
- Brian Mawhinney (PhD Radiation Physics, 1969), former chairman of the UK Conservative Party and Secretary of State for Transport
- Alison McGovern (Philosophy), UK Labour Party politician
- Fiona Mactaggart (PGCE), UK Labour Party politician and former government minister
- Steve Matenje, Malawian civil servant and Permanent Representative to the United Nations
- Lord Tom McNally (LLB), Liberal Democrat Party politician and former deputy leader of the UK House of Lords; president of the University College London Union
- Sir William Meyer, first High Commissioner of India to the United Kingdom (1920–1922)
- Amanda Milling (Economics and Statistics, 1997), UK Conservative Party politician
- Edwin Montagu, former UK secretary of state for India, minister of munitions and chancellor of the Duchy of Lancaster
- Anil Moonesinghe (LLB), Sri Lankan government minister and Trotskyist politician
- Baroness Sally Morgan (MA Education), UK Labour Party politician and former chair of Ofsted
- Baroness Delyth Morgan (Physiology), chief executive of Breakthrough Breast Cancer and former UK government minister
- Arinori Mori (森有礼), first Japanese ambassador to the US and founder of Japan's modern educational system as minister of education
- Lord Paul Myners (BA Education, PGCE), UK businessman and former financial secretary to the treasury ("city minister")
- Stan Newens, UK Labour Co-operative politician and chair of the European Parliamentary Labour Party
- Jesse Norman (MPhil, PhD Philosophy, 2003, and later lecturer), UK Conservative Party politician and government minister
- Harry Nkumbula (diploma), Northern Rhodesian/Zambian nationalist leader
- Stella Nyanzi (MS), Ugandan human rights activist
- John Olumba (Law), American Independent Democratic politician and Member of the Michigan House of Representatives
- Stephen Owen (LLM, 1974), minister of Western Economic Diversification of Canada and minister of state for sport
- Aziz Pahad (diploma in International Relations, 1966), South African ANC Party politician and former deputy minister of foreign affairs (1999–2008)
- Michael Palmer (LLB, 1992), former speaker of the Parliament of Singapore
- Sir Walter Palmer, former UK Conservative Party politician and biscuit manufacturer
- Pambos Papageorgiou (PhD Political Philosophy), AKEL Party of Cyprus politician
- Michalis Papapetrou, Cypriot politician and former president of the United Democrat Party of Cyprus
- Muhammad Ali Pate, former minister of state for health of Nigeria (2011–2013), now professor at Duke University's Global Health Institute
- Kash Patel (certificate in International Law), 9th director of the Federal Bureau of Investigation
- Andrew Pattulo, Canadian former Ontario Liberal Party politician Member of the Legislative Assembly of Ontario
- Bernard Peiris (LLB), former cabinet secretary of Ceylon, who drafted the 'Ceylon Order in Council', the first constitution of independent Ceylon
- Colin Phipps (BSc Geology, 1955), former UK Labour Party and UK Social Democratic Party politician
- Thomas Bayley Potter, former UK Liberal Party politician
- Sir Robert John Price (medicine, 1876), former UK Liberal Party politician
- William Edwin Price (BA, 1959), former UK Liberal Party politician
- Murad Qureshi (MSc Environmental Economics), UK Labour Party politician and former Member of the London Assembly
- Yasmin Qureshi (LLM), UK Labour Party politician
- Sir John Randall (Serbo-Croat Language and Literature, 1979), former Government Deputy Chief Whip of the House of Commons
- Kulveer Ranger (Architecture, 1996), former advisor, Director of Transport Policy and then Environment for the mayor of London Boris Johnson
- Baroness Patricia Rawlings, UK Conservative Party politician
- Andrew Reid (LLB), lawyer, horse racing trainer and current treasurer of the UK Independence Party
- Nafesha Richardson (LLM), women rights' advocate and climate activist from Saint Vincent and the Grenadines
- Winston Roddick (LLB), current Police and Crime commissioner for North Wales Police (2012–)
- Sir William Rose, former UK Conservative Party politician and lord mayor of London (1862)
- Christos Rozakis (LLM, 1970), former deputy foreign minister of Greece, president of the Administrative Tribunal of the Council of Europe and first vice-president of the European Court of Human Rights
- Sir Sydney Russell-Wells (BSc, 1889), former UK Conservative Party politician and vice-chancellor of the University of London
- James Rutherford, former Canadian Liberal Party politician
- Sir John Salmond (LLB, Gilchrist scholarship), former solicitor-general of New Zealand (1910–1920); represented New Zealand at the Washington Naval Conference (1921–1922)
- Sir Ernest Satow, former British ambassador to Japan and British ambassador to China, the UCL Chair of Japanese Law is named after him
- John Edward Sears (Architecture), former UK Liberal Party politician and architect
- Navin Shah, UK Labour Party politician and Member of the London Assembly
- Tulip Siddiq (BA English Literature), UK Labour Party politician
- Sarup Singh (PhD English Literature, 1953), former governor of Gujarat (1990–1995) and governor of Kerala (1990)
- Henry Smith (Philosophy), UK Conservative Party politician
- Sir Arthur Snelling, former UK ambassador to South Africa (1970–1973) and UK high commissioner to Ghana (1959–1961)
- Anthony Steen (LLB), UK Conservative Party politician
- Marie Stopes, campaigner for eugenics and women's rights)
- Lord William Strang, former Permanent Under-Secretary of State at the UK Foreign Office (1949–1953) and diplomat; sat on the UCL college committee
- F.W. Strange (medicine), former Canadian Liberal-Conservative Party politician
- Sir Dudley Stewart-Smith (LLB), former UK Liberal Party politician and barrister
- Colin Sutton (LLB, 1970), former assistant commissioner (Personnel and Training) of the London Metropolitan Police (1987–1988) and director of the Police Scientific Development Branch at the UK Home Office (1991–1993)
- Sir Charles Swann, former UK Liberal Party politician
- Manuela Sykes, former UK Liberal Party, Labour Party politician and dementia campaigner
- Ernest Symons, former director-general of the board of the UK Inland Revenue
- William Ngartse Thomas Tam (LLB, 1923), former member of the Legislative Council of Hong Kong and judge
- Sarah Teather (PhD, did not graduate), UK Liberal Democrat Party politician and former minister of state for children and families (2010–2012)
- Tan Boon Teik (LLB, LLM, 1953), former attorney-general of Singapore (1967–1992)
- Munenori Terashima (寺島宗則), former Imperial Japanese diplomat
- Stephen Terrell, former president of the UK Liberal Party (1971–1972)
- Baroness Jenny Tonge (MB BS, 1964), independent (former UK Liberal Democrat Party) politician
- Lord Denis Tunnicliffe (BSc Mathematics, 1965), UK Labour Party politician and Opposition Deputy Chief Whip in House of Lords
- Apostolos Tzitzikostas (Public Policy and Economics), Greek politician and Governor of Central Macedonia (2013–)
- Jan Vincent-Rostowski (BSc, MA Economy and History, 1964), Polish politician, former deputy prime minister of Poland and finance minister
- V. Viswanathan, Ggvernor of Kerala, India (1967–1973)
- Makis Voridis (Μαυρουδής (Μάκης) Χρήστου Βορίδης) (LLM), Greek politician and former minister for health
- William Wedgwood-Benn, Viscount Stansgate, former UK Secretary of State for India and Secretary of State for Air
- George Hammond Whalley (Metaphysics and Rhetoric), former UK Liberal Party politician
- John Whittingdale (Economics, 1982), UK Conservative Party politician and former UK Secretary of State for Culture, Media and Sport
- Lord Michael Williams (BSc, 1971), former United Nations Special Coordinator for Lebanon and UN Special Coordinator for the Middle East Peace Process
- Henry Wilson-Fox, former UK Conservative Party politician, businessman and associate of Cecil Rhodes
- Henry Winterbotham (BA, LLB, 1959, Hume Scholar and University Law Scholar), former UK Liberal Party politician and Under-Secretary of State for the Home Department
- Thomas McKinnon Wood, former UK Liberal Party politician, Secretary for Scotland and Chancellor of the Duchy of Lancaster
- Sidney Woolf, former UK Liberal Party politician
- Iain Wright (BA, MA History, 1995), UK Labour Party politician and former government minister
- Durmuş Yılmaz (MA), Turkish Nationalist Movement Party politician and former governor of the Central Bank of Turkey (2006–2011)
- Lord David Young (LLB), former UK secretary of state for trade and industry and Secretary of State for Employment; chairman of the UCL Council 1995–2005
- Yamao Yōzō (尾 庸三) (Science and industry, as one of the "Chōshū Five"), former Imperial Japanese government minister credited as 'the Father of Japanese engineering'
- Nadhim Zahawi (BSc Chemical Engineering), UK Conservative Party politician and former UK chancellor of the Exchequer

=== Royalty ===
- Tengku Muhammad Fa-iz Petra (PhD History), former crown prince of Kelantan, one of the crown princes of Malaysia, as a federal constitutional monarchy
- Princess Alexia of the Netherlands (BSc Science & Engineering for Social Change), daughter of King Willem-Alexander of the Netherlands

=== Literary figures and authors ===
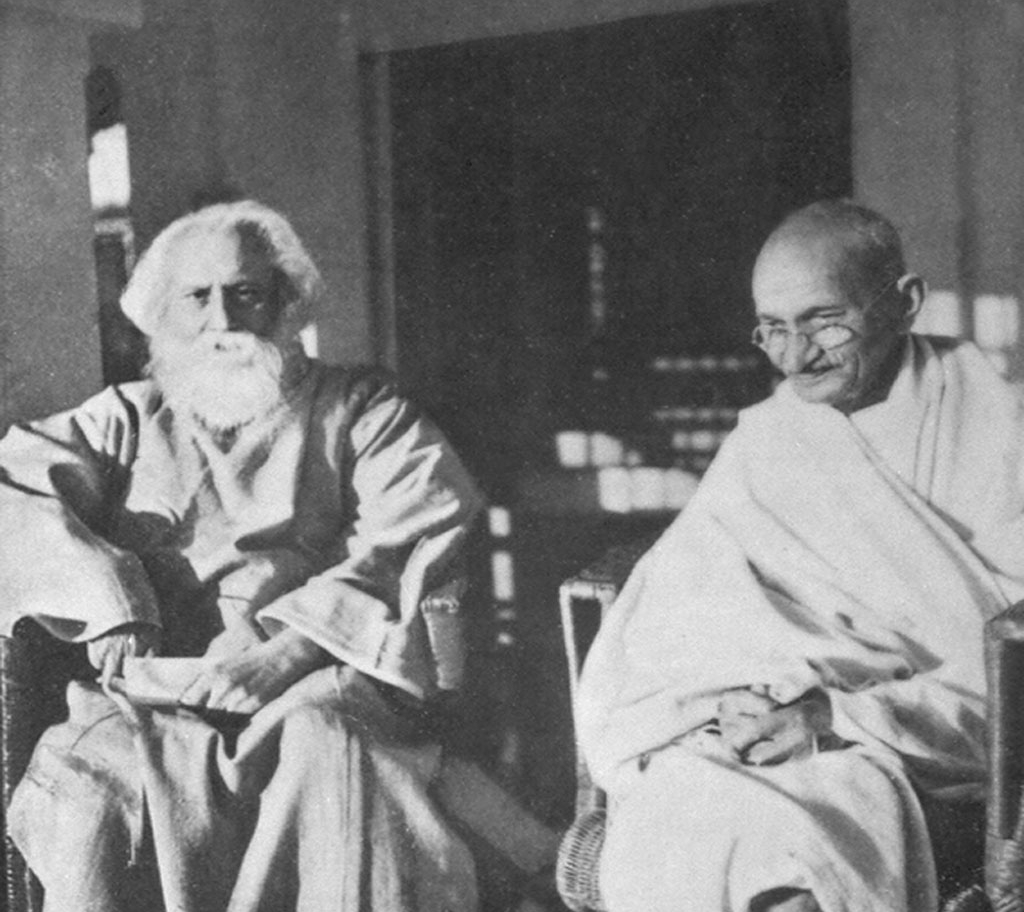
Rabindranath Tagore, the first Asian Nobel Laureate, with Gandhi, both of whom took courses at UCL

- Gabriela Aguileta (PhD Genetics), author and scientist
- Refaat Alareer (MA, 2007), Palestinian writer, poet, professor, and activist
- Karim Alrawi, playwright and writer
- M. R. Anand, writer and pioneer of the English novel in India
- Kofi Awoonor (MA), Ghanaian poet, academic and politician
- Julian Baggini (PhD Philosophy, 1996), philosopher and author
- Antonia Barber, author of books for children and adults
- Pat Barr
- Raymond Briggs
- Caroline Brothers, novelist and foreign correspondent
- Robert Browning (studied Greek for one year)
- Amit Chaudhuri
- G. K. Chesterton
- Paul Cornell (did not graduate)
- Bernard Cornwell (BA History, 1966), author of historical fiction
- David Crystal
- Nigel Davies (PhD Archaeology), historian of pre-Columbian America and former UK Conservative Party politician
- Ruby Dhal, poet and author
- Roly Drower, satirist and activist
- Romesh Chunder Dutt (রমেশচন্দ্র দত্ত)) (later professor of Indian History), Indian civil servant and writer who translated the Ramayana and Mahabharata; president of the Indian National Congress (1899)
- Sir Geoffrey Elton (PhD History, 1949), prominent political historian of the Tudor period
- Ken Follett
- Clare Francis
- Stella Gibbons
- Simon Inglis, architectural historian and sports writer
- David Irving (Political Economy), Holocaust denier and author
- Laila Lalami
- David Lodge, author
- Dimitris Lyacos
- Helen MacInnes
- David Magarshack, biographer and translator of Russian authors
- Jonathan Miller
- Gladys Mitchell
- Bel Mooney
- Blake Morrison
- Ian Mortimer (MA), historian and historical fiction author
- Chioma Okereke
- Tomiwa Owolade, journalist and author
- Clive Sansom
- Jim Smith, writer
- Michael Smith, author of The Giro Playboy etc.
- Natsume Sōseki (夏目 漱石), foremost Japanese novelist of the Meiji Era (1868–1912)
- Rabindranath Tagore (Law 1878–1879, did not graduate), Bengali poet and polymath; first non-European to win the Nobel Prize in Literature (1913)
- Sean Thomas, journalist and novelist
- Marianne Winder
- Ken Wiwa
- Jerrold Yam, Singaporean poet and lawyer

=== Film, television, theatre and radio ===
- Sir Ken Adam (Architecture; did not complete studies due to outbreak of WWII), Academy Award-winning film production designer famous for designing the sets for various James Bond films (including the first Dr. No) and the famous car for the film Chitty Chitty Bang Bang
- Jassa Ahluwalia (Spanish and Russian), actor
- Babar Ahmed, film director
- Franny Armstrong (Zoology), documentary film director
- Ikenna Azuike (LLB with French Law), TV broadcaster and presenter of What's Up Africa
- David Baddiel, comedian and television presenter
- Roy Battersby, Film and TV director (1954)
- Guy de la Bédoyère (MA Archaeology, 1987), historian, TV personality and Time Team historical expert
- Brooke Burfitt, actress and radio presenter
- George Clarke (postgraduate diploma), architect and TV presenter of shows including George Clarke's Amazing Spaces
- Nat Coombs, presenter, writer and comedian
- Tom Courtenay, actor
- Andrew Davenport, co-creator of the Teletubbies
- Andrew Davies (BA English, 1957), novelist and screenplay writer. His famous works include Mr Selfridge, House of Cards (UK) and a 1995 adaptation of Pride and Prejudice
- Ptolemy Dean (Architecture), architect and TV presenter
- Naamua Delaney (LLB), news presenter
- Felix Dexter (LLB), actor and comedian
- Clarissa Dickson-Wright (LLB), celebrity chef, writer and TV personality
- Jonathan Dimbleby, writer and television presenter
- Frank Dunlop, former director of the Edinburgh International Festival; founder and former director, The Young Vic (1979)
- Jane Fallon, English producer and novelist, known for her work on popular series Teachers, 20 Things To Do Before You're 30, EastEnders and This Life
- Trey Farley, television presenter
- Honey G, rap music artist, X Factor 2016 debut
- Tony Garnett, film and TV producer, actor
- Ricky Gervais, comedian/actor, co-writer and director of The Office (studied biology and philosophy)
- Peter Ginn, archaeologist, historian, author and presenter of Victorian Farm, Edwardian Farm, Wartime Farm
- Rachel Hurd-Wood, actress; best known for playing Wendy Darling in the 2003 film Peter Pan
- Amy Jenkins, creator of This Life
- Christian Jessen, medical doctor and television presenter
- Griffith Jones, actor
- James Robertson Justice, actor (left after a year)
- Dominic Keating, actor, including in Star Trek: Enterprise
- Jim Loach, film and television director
- Trevor Lock, comedian and actor
- Philip Mackie, film and television writer
- Jeremy Marre, film director
- Steph McGovern, BBC Breakfast television presenter
- Oliver Messel, influential leading stage designer
- Fiona Millar, journalist and campaigner on education and parenting issues
- Karen Mok, Hong Kong diva and movie star
- Michael Mosley, psychiatrist and TV presenter
- Maryam Moshiri, BBC newsreader
- Mary Nighy, actress
- Sir Christopher Nolan (English, 1993), Academy Award-winning director of films including Oppenheimer, Inception, Interstellar, Memento and The Dark Knight Trilogy
- Sean O'Connor, television and radio producer
- Raj Persaud, psychiatrist and broadcaster
- Mark Porter, doctor, journalist and TV presenter
- Jonathan Ross (Modern European History), TV presenter
- Adam Rutherford, TV presenter and editor for the journal Nature
- Irene Shubik, television producer
- Michael Smith, writer and broadcaster
- Nima Taleghani, actor and playwright
- Suzie Templeton, Academy Award-winning writer, director and animator, including Peter and the Wolf
- Fagun Thakrar, actor and writer-director
- Emma Thomas (UCL History 1993), Academy Award-winning producer
- Matthew Vaughn (Anthropology and Ancient History), producer and director of films including Lock, Stock and Two Smoking Barrels, Layer Cake, Kick-Ass, X-Men: First Class, and Kingsman: The Secret Service
- Arthur Wimperis, Academy Award-winning screenwriter
- Patrick Wymark, actor
- Alex Zane, presenter, radio DJ and stand-up comedian

=== Editors, journalists and publishers ===
- Fiona Armstrong (German literature), journalist
- Walter Bagehot, former editor of The Economist
- Christopher Paul Baker, travel writer, photographer, and adventure motorcyclist
- Victoria Barnsley, editor-in-chief at HarperCollins
- Jeremy Bowen, journalist, BBC Middle East editor
- Sarah Cullen (BA English, 1972), radio and TV journalist
- John Derbyshire, essayist, novelist, popularizer of mathematics history
- Sara Edwards (BA Medieval and Modern History), journalist and former presenter of BBC Wales Today
- Nicholas Garland, first and current political cartoonist, The Daily Telegraph
- A. A. Gill, columnist, The Sunday Times (Slade School of Fine Art)
- Jeanne Hoban, The Ceylon Observer, Jana, The Patriot, The Nation (all Sri Lanka); Anglo-Sri Lankan Trotskyist trade unionist and political activist
- Richard Hutton, former editor of The Economist
- Nicholas de Jongh, drama critic, The London Evening Standard
- Mark Lawson, columnist, The Guardian; radio and television presenter
- Walter Layton, 1st Baron Layton, former editor of The Economist
- Vivienne Parry, journalist, The Times and BBC
- Gabriel Pogrund, Whitehall editor, The Sunday Times
- Nick Paton Walsh, Emmy award-winning Senior International correspondent at CNN
- L. J. K. Setright: writer and journalist
- Carol Thatcher (LLB), journalist, author, media personality and daughter of former UK Prime Minister Margaret Thatcher
- Michael White, political editor, The Guardian
- Petronella Wyatt, writer, The Spectator
- Jan Ziff, journalist, BBC World Service, and children's writer

=== Musicians, musicologists and musical commentators ===
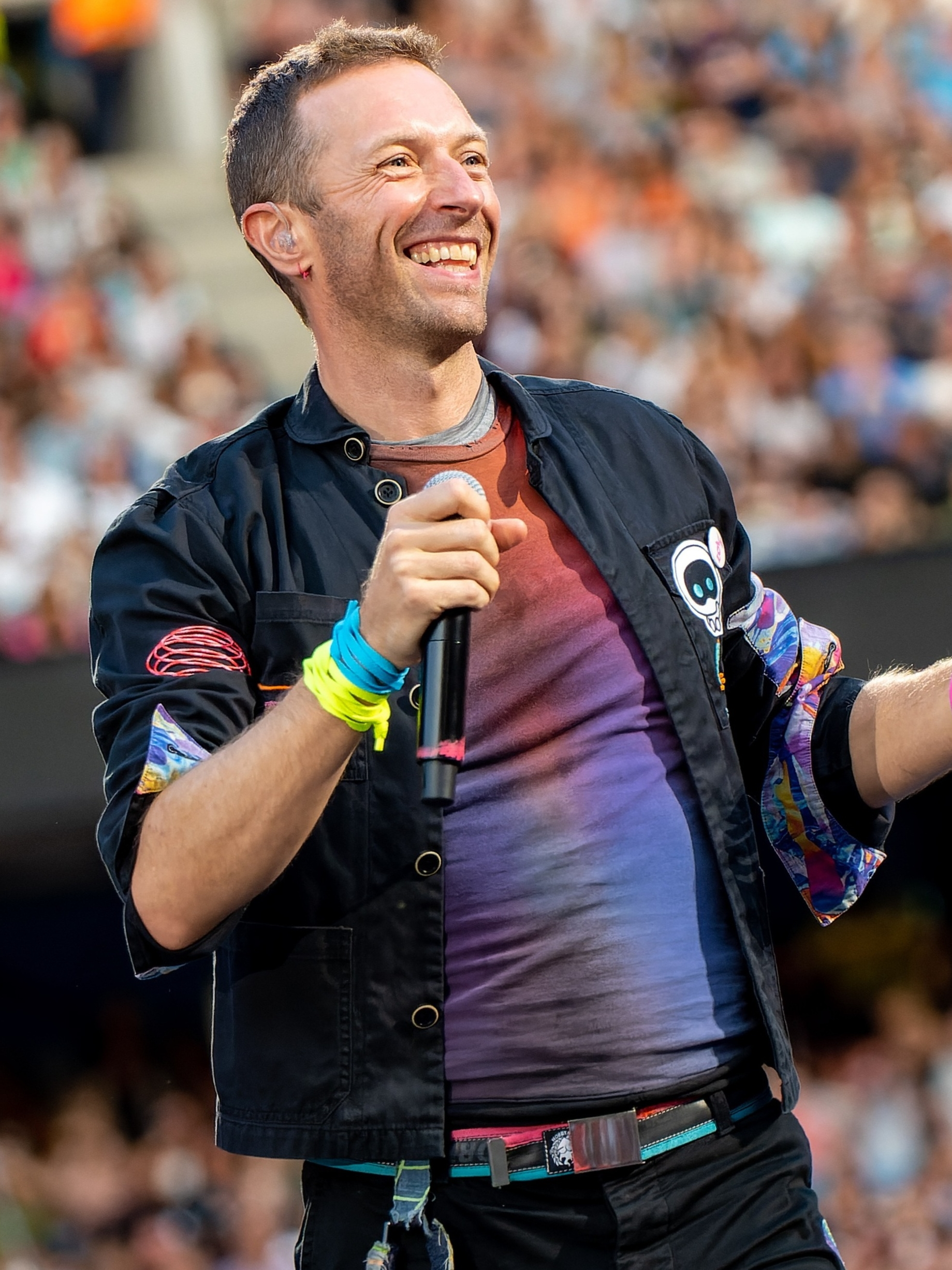
Chris Martin

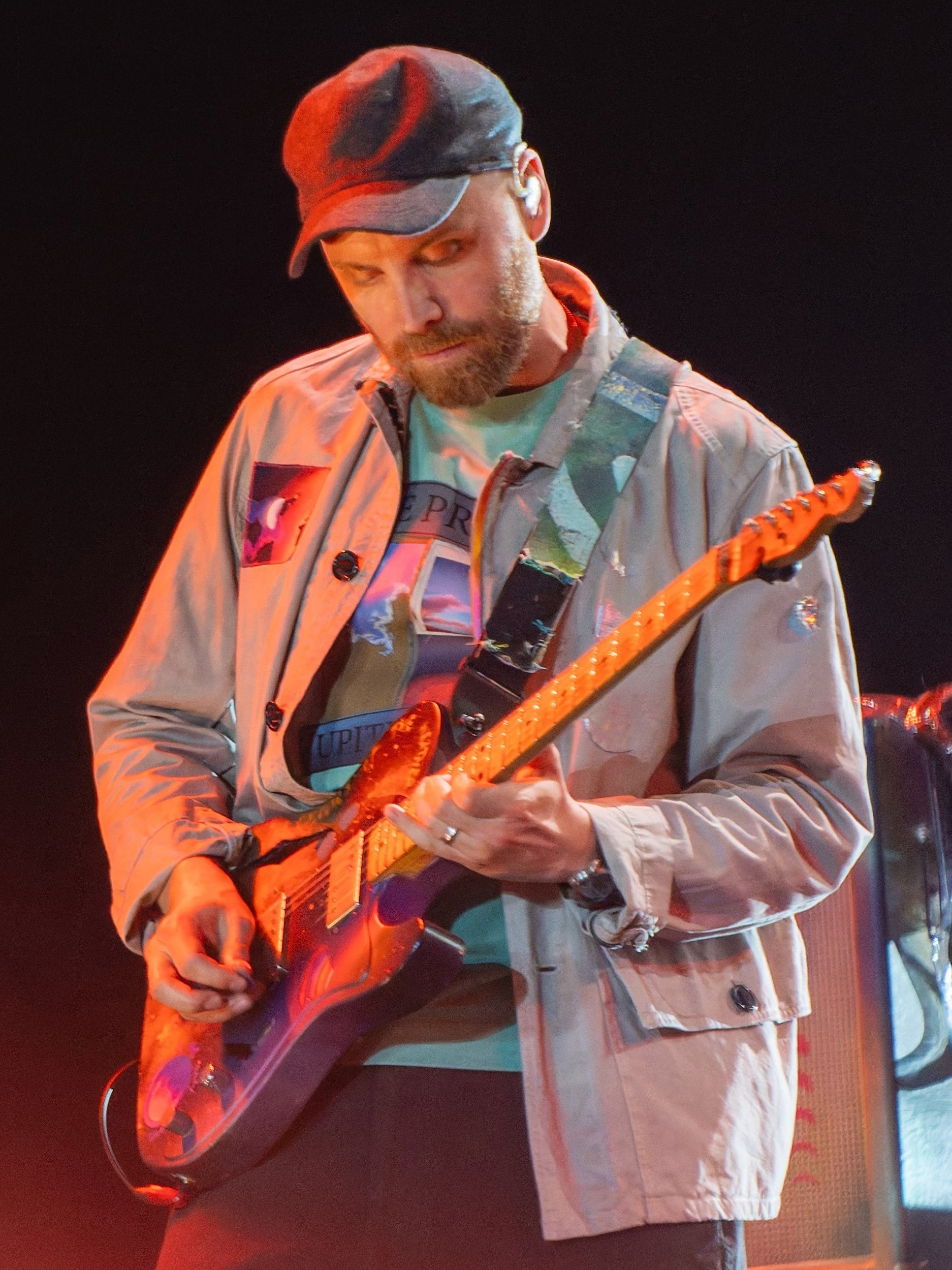
Jonny Buckland

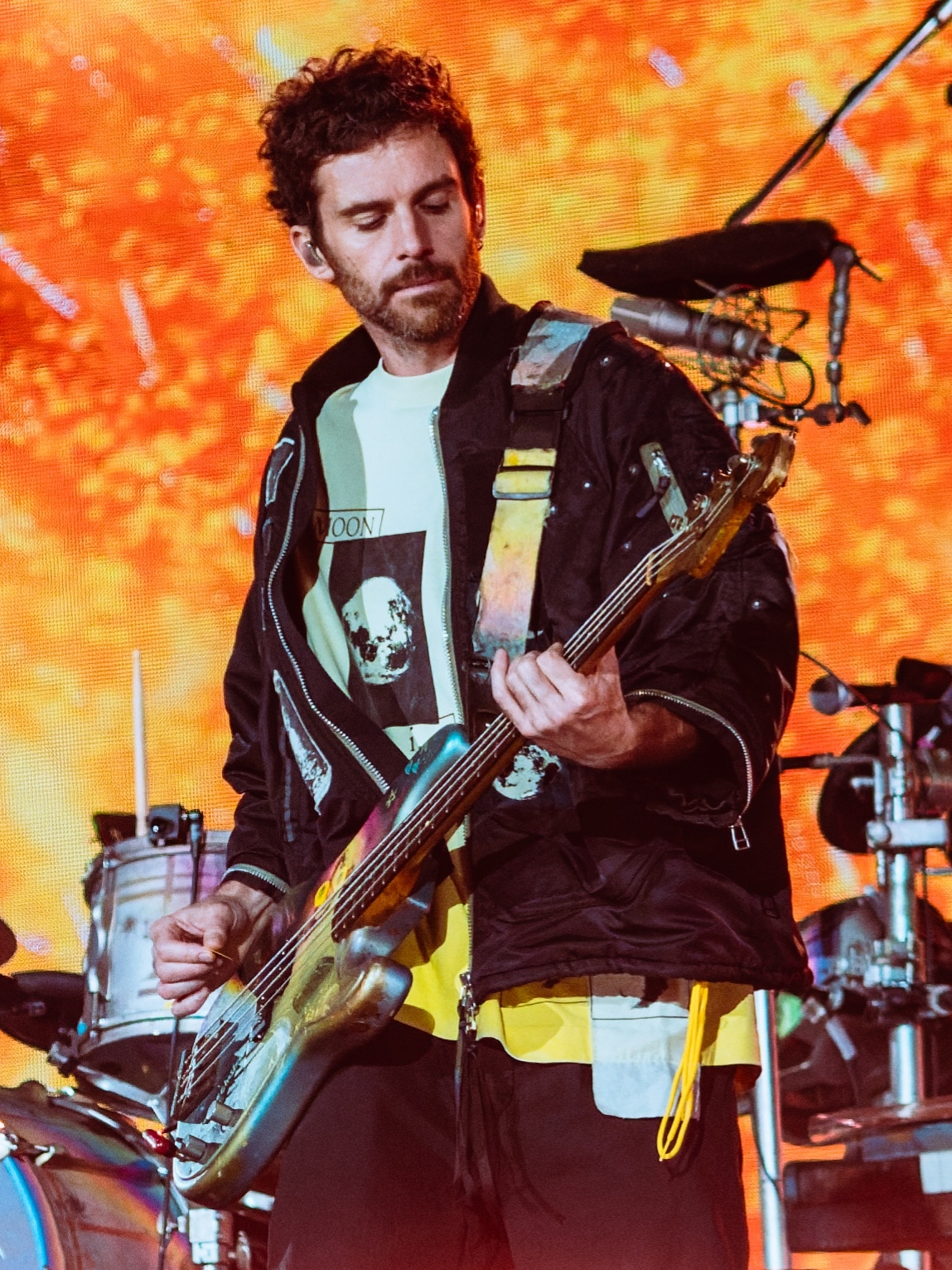
Guy Berryman

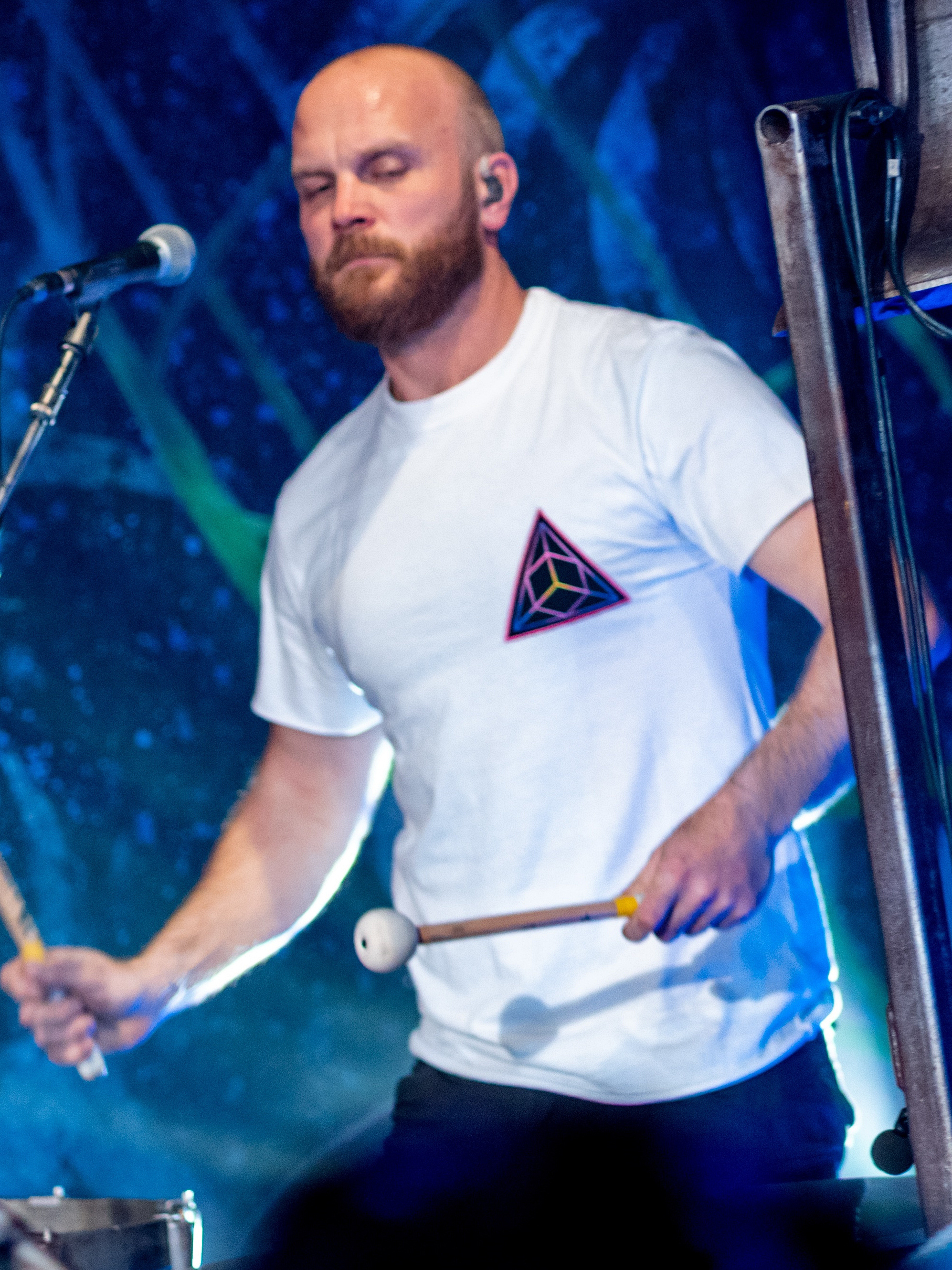
Will Champion

The members of Coldplay met each other while studying at UCL. They are regarded as the most successful band of the 21st century.
- Brett Anderson, Suede
- Sophie Barker, singer, occasional vocalist for Zero 7 and Groove Armada (did not graduate)
- Guy Berryman, Coldplay
- Jonny Buckland, Coldplay
- Will Champion, Coldplay
- David Conway
- John Curwen, proponent of tonic sol-fa
- Kathleen Dale née Richards, translator, musicologist, composer and pianist (Swedish: 1926–8)
- Zarif Davidson, known professionally as Zarif
- Justine Frischmann, Elastica
- Leonard Feather, jazz musician, composer, and writer (1932)
- Joshua Hayward, The Horrors
- Philip Heseltine aka Peter Warlock, composer and music critic (English)
- Gustav Holst, composer and teacher, took classes in Sanskrit in 1909
- Ravi Kesavaram, My Vitriol
- James Marriott, English indie-rock musician
- Chris Martin, Coldplay
- Jack Peñate, singer-songwriter
- Tim Rice-Oxley, Keane
- Harold Rosenthal, music critic
- Mary Louisa White, composer
- Benjamin Zander, conductor, Boston Philharmonic

=== Sporting figures ===
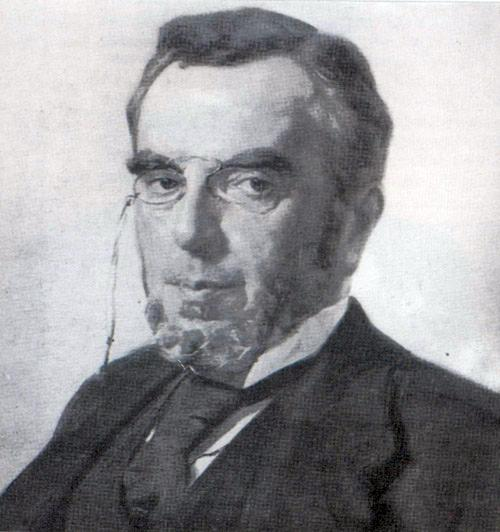
Demetrius Vikelas served as the first president of the International Olympic Committee for the first modern Olympic Games in Athens

- Donald Barrell (Anthropology), rugby union player formerly of Saracens F.C.
- Colin Chapman, founder of Lotus Cars
- Samuel Azu Crabbe (LLB), former chief justice of Ghana and President of the National Olympic Committee of Ghana
- Ewan Davies (LLB), former Welsh rugby union international
- David Gower, cricketer and former England captain
- Isa Guha, cricketer, England Women's
- Patrick Head, co-founder of Formula One team WilliamsF1
- Christine Ohuruogu, sprinter and World Athletics Championships, Olympic Games and Commonwealth Games 400 metres champion
- Ebony-Jewel Rainford-Brent, cricketer, England Women's
- Gayatri Reddy (BSc Construction Management), former owner of now-defunct Deccan Chargers in the Indian Premier League
- Nathaniel "Noddy" Reilly-O'Donnell, rower, 2006 World Junior Champion and silver medallist at the 2011 World Rowing Championships
- Peter Short (Master's in International Planning), Canadian international and Olympic field hockey player
- Andrew Simpson (BSc Economics), British Olympic Games Men's Star sailing gold medalist (2008)
- Dawson Turner (medicine), rugby union international who represented England (1871–75).
- Demetrius Vikelas (Botany), first president of the International Olympic Committee (1894–1896)
- Maurice Watkins (LLB, LLM), director of Manchester United's football board and club's solicitor
- Robin Williams, professional rowing coach for Team GB and former competitive World Championships rower
- Melanie Wilson (Master's in Biochemical Engineering), British rower who competed at the 2012 Summer Olympics in Women's quadruple sculls
- Soh Rui Yong (Bachelor of Laws), marathon runner, multiple Southeast Asian Games medalist and Singapore national record holder, and 5-time Singapore marathon national champion

=== Other notable alumni ===
- Barnett Abrahams (BA), former principal of the London School of Jewish Studies and the first English Jewish minister to hold a British university degree
- Michael Adler, first Jewish chaplain to serve in a theatre of war
- Kaniz Ali (LLB, 2007), entrepreneur, makeup artist and columnist
- Sheikh Zaki Badawi (BSc psychology, 1954), Egyptian Islamic scholar, interfaith-dialogue activist and founder of the Muslim College in London
- Ben Barkow, writer and director of the Wiener Library
- Roger Bate, economist formerly of the Institute of Economic Affairs and other free market-orientated organisations
- Lynne Brindley, former chief executive of the British Library
- George Cassidy (MPhil, 1967), former bishop of Southwell and Nottingham
- Brian Castle, current bishop of Tonbridge
- Isaac Cohen, former chief rabbi of Ireland
- Francis Lyon Cohen, first Jewish chaplain in the British Army
- Altheia Jones-LeCointe, activist and leader of Black Panther Party in the UK in 1960s and 1970s
- Jecca Craig, British environmental conservationist
- Pen Hadow, polar explorer and author
- J. Leonard Levy, American rabbi
- John Stuart Mill, major political philosopher, attended lectures on jurisprudence by John Austin at UCL
- Barry Morgan, former archbishop of Wales
- Lieutenant Colonel Arthur Martin-Leake (medicine), soldier who received both the Victoria Cross and the Bar
- Hugh Price-Hughes, Methodist theologian
- Lieutenant-General Jonathon Riley (geography), former master of the Royal Armouries (2009–2012) and deputy commander of the International Security Assistance Force in Afghanistan (2008–2009)
- Jackie Tabick (BA Medieval History), first female British rabbi
- F. Sherwood Taylor (PhD History of Science), former director of the Science Museum, London (1950–1956)
- Sonia Solicari, director of the Museum of the Home
- Henry Solly, founder of Working Men's Club and Institute Union; an important advocate for the extension of working class political rights, and helping to set up the Charity Organisation Society
- Samuel Bishop, former bishop of Kingston (1915–1921) and canon of St George's Chapel, Windsor Castle (1921–1929)
- Emma Thynn, Viscountess Weymouth

== Fictional figures ==
=== Fictional alumni and students ===
- Pat Barker's novels, Life Class and Toby's Room, follow students and teachers at the UCL Slade School of Fine Art.
- Protagonist/s in Gilbert Cannan's Mendel
- Lara Croft, protagonist of the Square Enix (previously Eidos Interactive) video game franchise Tomb Raider
- Molly MacDonald in Monarch of the Glen is a former Slade School student.
- Griffin in H G Wells The Invisible Man is a former UCL Medical School medical student who dropped medicine to study optics.
- Dr Arthur Kemp in H.G. Wells' The Invisible Man trained to be a doctor at UCL Medical School.
