= Andrew Goldberg =

Andrew Goldberg may refer to:

- Andrew Goldberg (director) (born 1968), American film producer/director
- Andrew Goldberg (writer) (born 1978), American television writer
- Andrew Goldberg (surgeon) (born 1970), British consultant orthopaedic surgeon
- Andrew V. Goldberg (born 1960), American computer scientist

== See also ==
- Andreas Goldberger (born 1972), Austrian ski jumper
