= David Werring =

British physician, neurologist

David J Werring FMedSci FRCP
- Education: Guy’s Hospital Medical School, King's College London; University College London
- Occupations: Neurologist, Clinical researcher, Stroke physician
- Medical career
- Institutions: University College London; UCL Queen Square Institute of Neurology; National Hospital for Neurology and Neurosurgery
- Sub-specialties: Neurology
- Research: Stroke

David John Werring is a British physician, neurologist, and academic specialising in stroke. He is professor of Neurology at the UCL Queen Square Institute of Neurology and current head of Stroke Research Centre and the Department of Translational Neuroscience and Stroke at UCL.

== Career ==
Werring received his Bachelor in Neurosciences in 1989 and his Bachelor in Medicine/Bachelor in Surgery from Guy's Hospital Medical School in 1992. He became a Member of the Royal Colleges of Physicians of the United Kingdom (MRCP) in 1995 and finished his PhD in clinical neurology at the UCL Queen Square Institute of Neurology in 2000. After completing his clinical training in neurology and stroke medicine in 2004, he was appointed consultant neurologist at the National Hospital for Neurology and Neurosurgery, University College Hospital and Watford General Hospital in 2005. Werring was made Reader in clinical neurology and honorary consultant neurologist in 2008, became a fellow of the Royal College of Physicians (FRCP) in 2012 and was made full professor at UCL Queen Square Institute of Neurology in 2015. In 2017, he became head of the Department of Brain Repair & Rehabilitation at the UCL Queen Square Institute of Neurology. The name of this department changed to the Department of Translational Neuroscience and Stroke in 2025.

Werring is a recognized expert in the field of stroke, chaired the UK Stroke Forum 2020-2022 and is immediate Past-President of the British and Irish Association of Stroke Physicians since December 2025. He was elected as a Life Member, Clare Hall, University of Cambridge, in 2023. He was appointed as a National Institute of Health Research (NIHR) Senior Investigator in 2024. He was elected to the Academy of Medical Sciences in 2025.

== Scientific expertise ==
Werring's core field of research is stroke, in particular cerebral small vessel disease, intracerebral hemorrhage and cerebral amyloid angiopathy. He has published more than 540 peer-reviewed articles on those topics and in other fields of clinical neurology. Werring has led large collaborative studies investigating cerebral microbleeds and has expertise in neuroimaging, with a focus on brain MRI. He was the Chief Investigator of a large multi-centre study investigating the timing of oral anticoagulation after ischemic stroke, OPTIMAS, funded by the British Heart Foundation and has been involved in several studies investigating the influence of COVID-19 and respective vaccines on stroke. He has a Google Scholar h-index of 123, and is an editor of the Queen Square textbook of Neurology (3rd Edition). He is an editorial board member of the European Stroke Journal and the International Journal of Stroke.

== Selected works ==
- Best, JG; Ambler, G; Wilson, D; et, al; Werring, DJ (2021). "Microbleeds International Collaborative Network. Development of imaging-based risk scores for prediction of intracranial haemorrhage and ischaemic stroke in patients taking antithrombotic therapy after ischaemic stroke or transient ischaemic attack: a pooled analysis of individual patient data from cohort studies". The Lancet Neurology. 20 (4): 294–303. doi:10.1016/S1474-4422(21)00024-7. hdl:20.500.11820/2a6b028d-ef79-48f6-89f3-99640f99e935. PMID 33743239. S2CID 232265303.
- Seiffge, DJ; Werring, DJ; Paciaroni, M; Dawson, J; Warach, S; Milling, TJ; Engelter, ST; Fischer, U; Norrving, B (2019). "Timing of anticoagulation after recent ischaemic stroke in patients with atrial fibrillation". The Lancet Neurology. 18 (1): 117–126. doi:10.1016/S1474-4422(18)30356-9. PMC 6524642. PMID 30415934.
- Wilson, D; Ambler, G; Lee, K-J; et, al; Werring, DJ (2019). "Cerebral microbleeds and stroke risk after ischaemic stroke or transient ischaemic attack: a pooled analysis of individual patient data from cohort studies". The Lancet Neurology. 18 (7): 653–665. doi:10.1016/S1474-4422(19)30197-8. PMC 6562236. PMID 31130428.
- Wilson, D; Ambler, G; Shakeshaft, C; et, al; Werring, DJ (2018). "CROMIS-2 collaborators. Cerebral microbleeds and intracranial haemorrhage risk in patients anticoagulated for atrial fibrillation after acute ischaemic stroke or transient ischaemic attack (CROMIS-2): multicentre observational cohort study". The Lancet Neurology. 17 (6): 539–547. doi:10.1016/S1474-4422(18)30145-5. PMC 5956310. PMID 29778365.
- Banerjee, G; Carare, R; Cordonnier, C; Greenberg, SM; Schneider, JA; Smith, EE; Buchem, MV; Grond, JV; Verbeek, MM; Werring, DJ (2017). "The increasing impact of cerebral amyloid angiopathy: essential new insights for clinical practice". Journal of Neurology, Neurosurgery, and Psychiatry. 88 (11): 982–994. doi:10.1136/jnnp-2016-314697. PMC 5740546. PMID 28844070.
