= W. Roger Williams =

English pathologist and surgeon (1854-1948)

W. Roger Williams FRCS
- Born: William Roger Williams; 6 January 1854
- Died: 30 May 1948 (aged 94); Walton, Somerset, England
- Occupations: Pathologist, surgeon

William Roger Williams FRCS (6 January 1854 – 30 May 1948) was an English pathologist, surgeon, cancer researcher and medical writer. He was an early researcher to suggest that excessive red meat consumption is a cause of cancer.

== Education ==
Williams was educated at Bristol Medical School and University College London.

== Career ==
In 1876, he was exhibitioner and gold medallist in clinical medicine and surgery at Bristol Royal Infirmary. He was house surgeon at Wigan Royal Infirmary, Western General Dispensary and St Peter's Hospital in London. He was clinical assistant at the Royal London Ophthalmic Hospital and surgical registrar at the Middlesex Hospital (1882–1889).

He established medical practice in Preston, Lancashire and London. From 1908 he lived at Walton, Somerset for forty years. Williams was a cancer researcher and wrote several books and many scientific papers on the subject. His book The Natural History of Cancer was positively reviewed in medical journals as a valuable reference work.

Williams noted that overeating and "gluttonous consumption of meat" in modern industrial cities as well as lack of exercise and fresh vegetable food were factors causing the increased rates of cancer.

== Death ==
Williams died on 30 May 1948, aged 94.

== Selected publications ==
- The Influence of Sex in Disease (1885)
- An Introduction to the Pathology of Cancer and Tumour Formation on the Basis of Evolution (1886)
- The Principles of Cancer and Tumour Formation (1888)
- On the Influence of Diet in the Causation of Cancer (1895)
- Cancer (General Pathology) (1898)
- Uterine Tumours: Their Pathology and Treatment (1901)
- Cancer in Egypt and the Causation of Cancer (1902)
- A Monograph on Diseases of the Breast (1895)
- The Natural History of Cancer (1908)
