= Andrew B. Wittkower =

British-born Canadian-American physicist (1934–2026)

- Born: Andrew Benedict Wittkower; November 7, 1934; London, England
- Died: March 14, 2026 (aged 91)
- Education: McGill University; University of Cambridge; University College London
- Occupation: Physicist
- Spouse: Mary Shotter (m. 1957; died. 2020)

Andrew Benedict Wittkower (November 7, 1934 – March 14, 2026) was a British-born Canadian-American physicist.

== Early life and career ==
Wittkower was born in London on November 7, 1934, the son of Eric David Wittkower and Claire Francesca Weil. At an early age, he and his family emigrated to Canada, settling in Montreal, Quebec. He attended McGill University, earning his BS degree in 1955. He also attended the University of Cambridge, earning his MS degree in 1959. In the same year, he emigrated to the United States, but returned and attended the University College London, earning his PhD degree in atomic physics in 1961. While attending at London, in 1960, he was named a fellow of the American Physical Society.

Wittkower worked as a research scientist at High Voltage Engineering Corporation until 1970. During the 1970s and 1980s, he co-authored peer-reviewed studies on ion implantation systems and semiconductor processing equipment. He served as co-founder of Ibis Technology from 1986 to 1991, and was president of High Temperature Engineering Corporation from 1992 to 1995. In 2001, he was named a fellow of the Institute of Electrical and Electronics Engineers, "for contributions and leadership in the development and advancement of ion implantation techniques, equipment and companies".

== Personal life and death ==
In 1957, Wittkower married Mary Shotter, a World War II codebreaker. Their marriage lasted until her death in 2020.

Wittkower died on March 14, 2026, at the age of 91.
