= Paul Garner (doctor) =

British epidemiologist

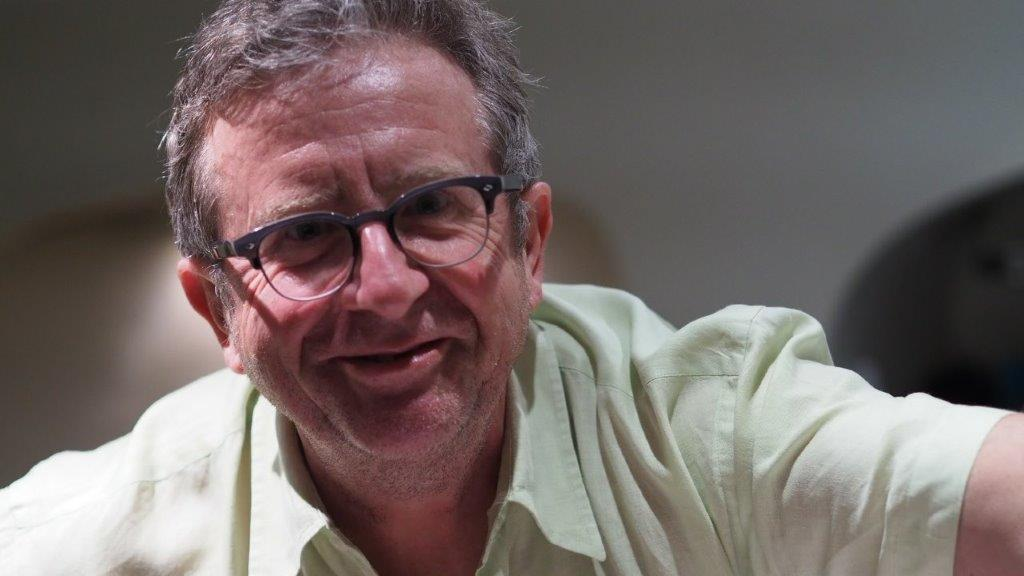
- Born: 25 August 1955 (age 71)
- Education: University College London.; University College Hospital Medical School - MB BS.; University of London - MD.
- Occupation: Medical researcher and academic
- Known for: Evidence-based medicine

Paul Garner is a British epidemiologist and public health professional, known for his work in systematic reviews and evidence-informed policy. He is currently an emeritus Professor, Evidence Synthesis in Global Health, at the Liverpool School of Tropical Medicine. Previously he was a member of the WHO malaria treatment guidelines group from 2004 to 2018.

== Early life and education ==
Paul Garner attended Spalding Grammar School in Lincolnshire, England, and he went on to study medicine at University College London and University College Hospital Medical School. He qualified as a medical doctor with a MB BS in 1979. He gained an MD from the University of London in 1990.

== Career ==
Garner worked in Papua New Guinea, and from 1982 to 1984 he ran the Aitape Health Center in West Sepik Province, a 100-bed hospital with a catchment area of 200,000 people. From 1984 to 1988 he worked as a researcher at the Papua New Guinea Institute of Medical Research branch in Madang.

Between 2004 and 2022, he was a full time Professor of Evidence Synthesis at the Liverpool School of Tropical Medicine (LSTM) and the Director of the Center for Evidence Synthesis in Global Health. He is now an emeritus professor at LSTM. He has also been an honorary research fellow at St. George's University School of Medicine, Grenada since 1997, and honorary Professor at the University of Stellenbosch since 2013. He has also directed a series of UK Government research and development programmes in evidence synthesis related to problems of the tropics and low- and middle-income countries, the most recent being READ-It from 2018 to 2024. He is a Fellow of the Faculty of Public Health.

== Notable contributions ==
In 1992, Paul Garner played a key role in the development of the Cochrane Collaboration after its founding. He led the Cochrane Infectious Diseases Group, whose reviews have helped underpin policy changes across the world.

Garner directly contributed to change in the formulation of oral rehydration solution and global policies related to its use in treatment of diarrheal diseases. At the time the World Health Organization (WHO) used a 311mOsm/L solution as the standard and Garner's systematic review clearly showed that lower osmolarity of 240mOsm/L is more effective.

Garner worked closely with the WHO in the development of malaria treatment guidelines from 2004 to 2018, organizing evidence synthesis for the three editions in 2006, 2010, and 2015. He played a key role in the introduction of Artemisinin-based combination treatments for malaria around the world.

His systematic reviews have also challenged global dogmas, including Directly Observed Therapy for tuberculosis, and routine de-worming of soil transmitted helminths in schoolchildren living in endemic areas in middle- and low-income countries.

=== Long COVID/ME/CFS and controversy ===
Drawing from the personal experience of suffering from the disease which he contracted in 2020, Garner worked to highlight the occurrence of Long COVID (post-COVID-19 syndrome) and health concerns related to it. He advocated that the involvement of communities of people who have recovered from post-viral illnesses would be helpful in management and treatment approaches. Over time, Garner rejected the notion of a purely biomedical cause of his own post-COVID illness and attributed his full recovery to psychological training including techniques of meditation and visualisation.

Garner's statements have created huge controversy among post-COVID and Myalgic encephalomyelitis/chronic fatigue syndrome (ME/CFS) activist groups, resulting in Garner receiving death threats, while others thanked him for opening a path to recovery for them. The ME Association and many other patient advocacy groups have been very critical of Garner's work on long COVID stating they fervently refute that the psychosomatic model of causation applies to Myalgic encephalomyelitis/chronic fatigue syndrome or long Covid.
