= Gabriela Aguileta =

Mexican writer (born 1974)

Gabriela Aguileta Estrada
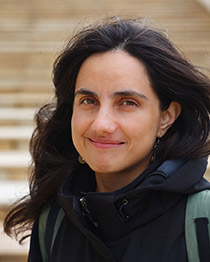
- c. 2012
- Born: Elizabeth Gabriela Aguileta Estrada; March 22, 1974 (age 52); Mexico City, Mexico
- Education: University College London, UNAM
- Occupations: Fiction writer; Writer of Children's Books; Scientific Writer; Scientist
- Writing career
- Period: 2000–present
- Genres: Children's literature; Science; Literary Essays
- Notable works: Siete Habitaciones a Oscuras; La conspiración de las tías; El espejo en el agua
- Notable awards: Premio Castillo de la Lectura 2001 for "La conspiración de las tías" Premio Castillo de la Lectura 2000 for "El espejo en el agua"
- Website: www.gabriela-aguileta.net

Elizabeth Gabriela Aguileta Estrada (born 1974) is a Mexican writer of children's books and short stories. Born in Mexico City, she studied biology at the Faculty of Sciences of the UNAM in Mexico and in 2004 earned a doctorate in genetics from University College London (UK). As a scientist and writer she has studied, worked and lived in Israel, Canada, England, Sweden, France, Spain and Switzerland.

She was on the editorial board of the children's literary magazine La sonrisa del gato and in 2004 she was awarded a writer's fellowship from the National Foundation for Mexican Literature (Fundación para las Letras Mexicanas). She has also authored three popular science books.

== Published works ==
=== Books ===
- El Espejo En El Agua (2000) by E. Gabriela Aguileta Estrada (Author) and Guillermo De Gante (Illustrator), 122pp, Ediciones Castillo (Castillo de La Lectura Naranja). ISBN 9702001315, ISBN 978-9702001317
- La Conspiracion de Las Tias (2001) by Gabriela Aguileta Estrada (Author) and Campos F. Angel (Illustrator), 133pp, Ediciones Castillo (Castillo de La Lectura Naranja). ISBN 970-2001749, ISBN 978-9702001744.
- Diarios Inconclusos I: El Oscuro Jardin de los Pelagos: 1 (2006) by Gabriela Aguileta, 96pp, Ediciones Castillo (Castillo del Terror). ISBN 970-2003547, ISBN 978-9702003540.
- La sombra del brujo (2006) by Gabriela Aguileta, 91pp, Editorial Progreso. ISBN 970-6417389, ISBN 978-9706417381.
- El domador de agua (2009) by Gabriela Aguileta, 120pp, Editorial Progreso. ISBN 978-607-456-154-8.

=== Popular Science Books for children ===
- Miguel Ángel & Gabriela Aguileta. (2006). "Las células madre", 24pp. Libros del escarabajo, México, D.F. ISBN 970-5775-20-6.
- Gabriela Aguileta (2005). "El origen de la vida", 24pp. Libros del escarabajo, México, D.F. ISBN 970-5775-17-6
- Gabriela Aguileta (2005). "Los virus", 24pp. Libros del escarabajo, México, D.F. ISBN 970-5775-15-X

=== Short stories ===
- Gabriela Aguileta Estrada (2009) "Sobre coprolitos y otras cosas menos embarazosas" in Los derechos de los niños no son cuento, 136pp, Montena. ISBN 978-6074297751.
- Gabriela Aguileta Estrada (2009) "Oquedades de la caja negra" in Boleto al infierno. Viaje sencillo, 210pp, Santillana. ISBN 978-6071103376.
- Gabriela Aguileta Estrada (2009) "Tres kilos para Plácido" in Siete cuentos muy cochinos, 164pp, Santillana. ISBN 978-6071105790.
- Gabriela Aguileta Estrada (2008) "Fábula del pez y el desierto" in Siete Habitaciones an Oscuras, 144pp, Grupo Editorial Norma (Torre De Papel: Amarilla). ISBN 970-0918513, ISBN 978-9700918518.
- Gabriela Aguileta (2010) "El cha cha chá de la letra zeta" in Torre De Papel: edición aniversario 20 años, 263pp, Grupo Editorial Norma (Torre De Papel: Rojo). ISBN 978-6079107024.
- Gabriela Aguileta (2014) "Topo" in Otras siete habitaciones a oscuras, 192pp, Grupo Editorial Norma (Torre de Papel: Amarilla). ISBN 978-6071302199.

=== Literary Essays ===
- Gabriela Aguileta (2007). "Los trópicos de Sir Galahad". Metapolítica: la mirada limpia de la política, Vol. 11, Nº. 56, págs. 91-92, ISSN-e 1405-4558
- Gabriela Aguileta (2008). "La desmesura de lo inhabitable". Metapolítica: la mirada limpia de la política, Vol. 12, Nº. 58, ISSN-e 1405-4558 (Ejemplar dedicado a: Heréticos y disidentes)
- Gabriela Aguileta (2008). "Cualquier lugar menos aquí". Metapolítica: la mirada limpia de la política, Nº. 61, ISSN-e 1405-4558 (Ejemplar dedicado a: Napoleón y la Independencia)
- Gabriela Aguileta (2009). "El espejo de la medusa: conócete a ti mismo, conoce tu genoma". Metapolítica: la mirada limpia de la política, Nº. 63, ISSN-e 1405-4558 (Ejemplar dedicado a: México: la sociedad indefensa)
- Gabriela Aguileta (2012). "Naturaleza (y) madre". Casa del Tiempo Vol. V época IV, número 55, p. 24-45, May 2012, ISSN 0185-4275.
- Gabriela Aguileta (2012). "La nuez". Casa del Tiempo Vol. V época IV, número 57-58, p. 16-17, Jul-Aug 2012, ISSN 0185-4275.
- Gabriela Aguileta (2016). "Sinuosidades del Lemán". Casa del Tiempo Vol. III época V, número 30-31, p. 18-21, Jul-Aug 2016, ISSN 2448-5446.

== Prizes ==
She has received the following prizes:

- Premio Castillo de la Lectura 2001 for "La conspiración de las tías".
- Premio Castillo de la Lectura 2000 for "El espejo en el agua".
