= Eva Sorensen =

British chemical engineer

Eva Sorensen MBE is a British chemical engineer. She is the first woman to lead the Department of Chemical Engineering at University College London. She was awarded the Institution of Chemical Engineers (IChemE)'s Frank Morton Medal for promoting best practice in chemical engineering education. Sorensen was appointed Member of the Order of the British Empire in the 2023 Birthday Honours for services to education and chemical engineering. She is a fellow of the Royal Academy of Engineering, the European Society for Engineering Education and the American Institute of Chemical Engineers.

== Life ==
Sorensen is a British chemical engineer. She has worked at University College London since 1996. She has a degree in chemical engineering from the Norwegian University of Science and Technology, graduating in 1989, after which she earned a PhD from the same institution in 1994. She conducted postdoctoral research at the Centre for Process Systems Engineering (CPSE) at Imperial College London.

Sorensen was appointed in 2020 as interim head of the Department of Chemical Engineering while Marc-Olivier Coppens was on a year sabbatical. She is the first woman to lead the department in its one hundred year history.

In 2018 Sorensen was honoured by the Institution of Chemical Engineers with the Frank Morton Medal for promoting best practice in chemical engineering education. The citation read "Medal awarded to Professor Eva Sorensen for being a key driver for innovation in teaching and learning, inside and outside her own institution. She was noted by the committee to have worked tirelessly over several decades to promulgate best practice in chemical engineering education." Also in 2018 she was elected a Fellow of the European Society for Engineering Education.

Sorensen was appointed Member of the Order of the British Empire in the 2023 Birthday Honours for services to education and chemical engineering.

In 2024 she was elected a fellow of the Royal Academy of Engineering The same year she was also elected a Fellow of the American Institute of Chemical Engineers.
