= Susan Swindells =

American AIDS researcher

- Born: England

Academic background
- Education: MD, 1977, University College London

Academic work
- Institutions: University of Nebraska Medical Center

Susan Swindells is an AIDS researcher.

== Early life and education ==
Swindells was born and raised in England, where she completed her medical degree at the University College London in 1977. She then completed three years of postgraduate training in England as well as a one-year residency at the University of Washington.

== Career ==
Upon joining the University of Nebraska Medical Center (UNMC) in 1991, Swindells began serving as medical director of the HIV Clinic with a special interest in tuberculosis co-infection. While serving in this role, she helped lower AIDS cases in Nebraska by 20 percent in 1998 and received a three-year federal grant to provide services in Nebraska to those at risk of the disease. At the turn of the 21st century, Swindells led the first study to show that select patients infected with HIV could "maintain complete viral suppression when they switch from standard triple-drug therapy to single-drug therapy". The pilot study was conducted on 36 patients, all of whom were well-controlled on standard therapy. As the Terry K. Watanabe Professor of Internal Medicine in the section of infectious diseases and medical director of the UNMC HIV Clinic, she also oversaw the opening of a new speciality care centre for patients with HIV.

As a result of her clinical skills, Swindells was invited to join and then chair the National Institute of Allergy and Infectious Diseases AIDS Clinical Trials Group committee on optimization of coinfection and comorbidity management as well as chair the Tuberculosis Working Group. Following this, she became a co-investigator for a study researchers say could lead to the end of the HIV/AIDS epidemic. The study showed that "the use of a combination of antiretroviral drugs by those with HIV/AIDS could stop the transmission of the disease to others in 96 per cent of cases." In recognition of her efforts, the study was deemed the scientific "Breakthrough of the Year" by the journal Science. Swindells was also invited to join the Scientific Advisory Boards to guide tuberculosis research in India and South Africa and serve as a leader within the AIDS Clinical Trials Group of the National Institutes of Health. In 2013, Swindells was appointed director of the UNMC Equity Office and Faculty Ombudsperson, taking over from Myrna Newland.

In 2019, Swindells was appointed as one of four scientists to lead an international, multi-site clinical trial evaluating drugs to be used to prevent multidrug-resistant tuberculosis. During the COVID-19 pandemic, Swindells was appointed by Anthony Fauci to serve on COVID-19 panel in order to produce the first guidelines for health care providers treating patients with COVID-19. She was also named the 14th UNMC Scientist Laureate, the highest honor UNMC bestows upon its researchers.
