= Lesley Fallowfield =

British cancer psychologist

Lesley Jean Fallowfield DBE (born October 1949) is a British cancer psychologist and a professor of psycho-oncology at the University of Sussex. The main outcomes of her research have been the establishment of assessment tools to measure quality of life in clinical trials of cancer patients and the design of educational programmes to improve oncologists' communication with their patients.

== Career ==
Fallowfield initially trained as a nurse at Guy's Hospital in London before studying a bachelor's degree in experimental psychology at the University of Sussex in 1980. She went on to complete a doctorate in psychophysics at Sussex and the University of Cambridge. She had originally planned to pursue a career in visual science but the death of a friend from graft-versus-host disease secondary to a bone marrow transplant for acute myeloid leukaemia inspired her to focus on cancer. In 1984, she began working for the King's College London Clinical Trials Unit, where she established assessment criteria to measure quality of life in trials of breast cancer. These tools are in use worldwide as of 2016.

Fallowfield received a grant from the Cancer Research Campaign in the late 1980s to research oncologists' communication skills and potential areas for improvement. She focused on the communications between doctors and their patients—particularly in communicating complex medical concepts, giving bad news, and recruiting patients to take part in clinical trials. This led her to design educational materials to enhance doctors' communication skills and to study the resulting effects on patients' health and wellbeing. In 1990, she became the director of the Cancer Research Campaign Communication and Counselling Research Centre and a lecturer at the London Hospital Medical College. She was appointed the first professor of psycho-oncology in the United Kingdom by University College London in 1997.

In 2001, Fallowfield moved from UCL to the University of Sussex, where she is a professor of psycho-oncology at Brighton and Sussex Medical School and the director of the University of Sussex Health Outcomes Research & Education in Cancer (SHORE-C) group. Throughout her career she has authored over 450 articles, book chapters and textbooks.

== Honours ==
- 2008 - elected Fellow of the Academy of Medical Sciences
- 2009 - received the BMJ Group Lifetime Achievement Award
- 2010 - received Pfizer/BOA Excellence in Oncology Lifetime Achievement Award
- 2016 - appointed a Dame Commander of the Order of the British Empire
- 2019 - ESO Umberto Veronesi Memorial Award

== Personal life ==
Fallowfield has two children. Her son is a hepatologist and her daughter is a paediatric nurse.
