= Klara Valko =

Scientist, consultant, academic and author

- Occupations: Scientist, consultant, academic and an author

Academic background
- Education: M Pharm; PhD, Pharmaceutical Chemistry and Pharmacology; DSc., Drug Discovery
- Alma mater: Semmelweis University; Hungarian Academy of Sciences

Klara Valko is a scientist, consultant, academic and author. She is the director of Bio-Mimetic Chromatography as well as an honorary professor at University College London School of Pharmacy.

Valko is most known for her work on early drug discovery and lead optimization. Among her authored works are her publications in academic journals, as well as books such as Chromatographic Determination of Molecular Interactions and Physicochemical and Biomimetic Properties in Drug Discovery: Chromatographic Techniques for Lead Optimization.

== Education ==
Valko completed her Master of Pharmacy from Semmelweis University in 1997, followed by a PhD in Pharmaceutical Chemistry and Pharmacology from the same institution in 1979. Later in 1996, she obtained a DSc degree in Drug Discovery from Hungarian Academy of Sciences.

== Career ==
In 1981, Valko joined the Hungarian Academy of Sciences, where she took on multiple roles, including heading the chromatography research group at the Central Research Institute for Chemistry of the Hungarian Academy of Sciences. Concurrently, she also served as a research scientist at the Institute of Enzymology from 1981 to 1985. Between 1993 and 1995, she worked as a senior research analytical chemist at Wellcome Research Laboratory. Subsequently, she held a position as a research investigator at GlaxoWellcome Medicines Research Centre from 1995 to 2000. From 2000 to 2015, she served as the senior research investigator at the Physicochemical Characterization Group at GlaxoSmithKline. In 2017, she founded Bio-Mimetic Chromatography and has been serving as its director since then. Later in 2019, she established Bio-Mimetic Cosmetics as a trading branch of Bio-Mimetic Chromatography.

From 1977 to 1981, Valko served as a lecturer in the Department of Pharmaceutical Chemistry at Semmelweis University. Additionally, she held a Mappletorpe research fellowship in the School of Pharmacy at the University of London from 1991 to 1993. Since 2004, she has held the position of honorary professor at the University College London School of Pharmacy.

== Works ==
Valko has authored various books throughout her career. In 1994, she co-authored a book titled Chromatographic Determination of Molecular Interactions with Tibor Cserháti. The book focused on the theory and practical application of measuring molecular interactions using various chromatographic techniques, compiling methods for calculating stability constants and presenting new results for a broad range of interactions. Her 2014 book titled Physicochemical and Biomimetic Properties in Drug Discovery: Chromatographic Techniques for Lead Optimization emphasized the importance of measuring physicochemical and biomimetic properties in early drug discovery. Moreover, in her multi-volume book series Separation Methods in Drug Synthesis and Purification, she provided an overview of analytical techniques in drug synthesis and purification, covering topics such as enantiomer separation, computer simulation for method development, and advancements in chromatography and preparative methods.

== Research ==
Valko's 1986 study compared the efficacy of microwave irradiation as a sample preparation method for chromatography with traditional approaches. This research highlighted its exceptional time and energy efficiency, particularly suited for rapid extractions in large sample series. In 1997, she invented the Chromatographic Hydrophobicity Index (CHI) based on reversed-phase HPLC retention times, offering a high-throughput approach for physicochemical profiling in drug design, demonstrating strong correlations with acetonitrile distribution and octanol/water partition coefficients. Her collaborative effort with GSK colleagues in 2003 outlined the development and validation of a rapid gradient HPLC method for determining Human Serum Albumin (HSA) binding of discovery compounds. In 2011, she proposed a novel approach, using calibrated HPLC retention times on biomimetic stationary phases to develop mechanistic models. This approach enabled estimating in vivo unbound volume of distribution (V(du)) and fraction unbound in tissue (f(ut)) during lead optimization, aiding consideration of in vitro potency and estimated in vivo pharmacokinetic distribution of compounds. In the same year, she explored the optimization of drug properties in drug discovery, introducing the drug efficiency index (DEI) as a marker of in vivo efficacy. Moreover, her 2015 study explored developing and optimizing a high-throughput assay for directly measuring intracellular compound concentration in HeLa cells.

Investigating the use of standardized HPLC methods, Valko's 2016 research suggested that Chromatographic properties measured at early stages of the drug discovery process can assess lipophilicity, oral absorption, volume of distribution, drug efficiency, and even early dose estimation. In related research, she introduced standardized procedures for accelerating drug discovery by evaluating in vivo distribution and non-specific binding through chromatographic profiling of analogs, highlighting the advantages over traditional metrics such as Ligand Lipophilicity Efficiency (LLE). Later, her 2018 work tackled peptide therapeutic challenges by assessing biomimetic properties like lipophilicity and membrane affinity via High-Performance Liquid Chromatography, using chemically bonded protein and immobilized artificial membrane stationary phases. Her 2021 suggested that membrane and alpha-1-acid glycoprotein retention can be considered as promising indices for assessing the ecotoxicological risk of drugs, with membrane models showing superior performance compared to those derived from the traditional octanol-water system. In addition, she also proposed a model using biomimetic HPLC methods and measured binding properties to predict hERG inhibition, addressing early screening for potential cardiotoxicity and reducing late-stage failures in drug discovery.

== Awards and honors ==
- 1989 – Young Scientist Award, Hungarian Academy of Sciences
- Fellow - The Royal Society of Chemistry
- Associate - The Royal Pharmaceutical Society

== Bibliography ==
=== Books ===
- Chromatographic Determination of Molecular Interactions (1994) ISBN 9780849344374
- Physicochemical and Biomimetic Properties in Drug Discovery: Chromatographic Techniques for Lead Optimization (2014) ISBN 9781118152126
- Separation Methods in Drug Synthesis and Purification (2020) ISBN 9780444640703

=== Selected articles ===
- Ganzler, K., Salgó, A., & Valkó, K. (1986). Microwave extraction: A novel sample preparation method for chromatography. Journal of Chromatography A, 371, 299–306.
- Valkó, K., Snyder, L. R., & Glajch, J. L. (1993). Retention in reversed-phase liquid chromatography as a function of mobile-phase composition. Journal of Chromatography A, 656(1–2), 501–520.
- Valkó, K., Bevan, C., & Reynolds, D. (1997). Chromatographic hydrophobicity index by fast-gradient RP-HPLC: a high-throughput alternative to log P/log D. Analytical Chemistry, 69(11), 2022–2029.
- Valko, K., Nunhuck, S., Bevan, C., Abraham, M. H., & Reynolds, D. P. (2003). Fast gradient HPLC method to determine compounds binding to human serum albumin. Relationships with octanol/water and immobilized artificial membrane lipophilicity. Journal of Pharmaceutical Sciences, 92(11), 2236–2248.
- Valkó, K. (2004). Application of high-performance liquid chromatography based measurements of lipophilicity to model biological distribution. Journal of Chromatography A, 1037(1–2), 299–310.
- Valko, K. (2016) Lipophilicity and biomimetic properties measured by HPLC to support drug discovery. Journal of Pharmaceutical and Biomedical Analysis, (130), 35–54.
- Valko, K.Ivanova-Berndt, G. Beswick, P. Kindey, M. Ko, D. (2018) Application of biomimetic HPLC to estimate lipophilicity, protein and phospholipid binding of potential peptide therapeutics. ADMET & DMPK 6(2) 162–175.
