= Katie Bentley =

British computer scientist

Katie Anne Bentley
- Education: University College London; University of Sussex
- Scientific career
- Workplaces: Francis Crick Institute; Harvard Medical School; King's College London
- Thesis: Adaptive behaviour through morphological plasticity in natural and artificial systems (2006)

Katie Bentley is a British computer scientist who is group leader in the Cellular Adaptive Behaviour Laboratory at the Francis Crick Institute and an academic at King's College London. Her research considers computational simulations of cellular interactions.

== Early life and education ==
Bentley studied mathematics as an undergraduate at the University of Sussex. She moved to University College London for doctoral research, where she studied morphological plasticity in robotic and biological systems. Bentley was then appointed a postdoctoral researcher with Holger Gerhardt at the Cancer Research UK Research Institute in London, where she studied experimental biology.

== Research and career ==
In 2013, Bentley was made an assistant professor at the Harvard Medical School, where she worked in the Center for Vascular Biology Research, and after two years established a satellite modelling laboratory. She was appointed to the Biological Design Centre in Boston University in 2017. In 2019 Bentley joined the Francis Crick Institute in London.

Bentley builds computational software to understand the communication between cells. Bentley is interested in emergent behaviour of cells and how nearby cells influence them. She has shown that it is possible for cells to help their nearby cells ('adaptive') or help a pathogen ('maladapted'). She has investigated the growth of blood vessels. Under normal conditions, these blood vessels adopt a hierarchical branching structure, but they can become maladapted and bulbous in tumours. This degeneration can lead to increased tumour metastasis. To tackle cancer progression, Bentley has proposed that it should be possible to switch the blood vessels back to a normal network structure – and that by studying blood vessel growth using artificial life simulations it should be possible to understand their organisation.

== Selected publications ==
- Lars Jakobsson; Claudio A Franco; Katie Bentley; et al. (26 September 2010). "Endothelial cells dynamically compete for the tip cell position during angiogenic sprouting". Nature Cell Biology. 12 (10): 943–953. doi:10.1038/ncb2103. ISSN 1465-7392. PMID 20871601. Wikidata Q42876374.
- Virginia Guarani; Gianluca Deflorian; Claudio A Franco; et al. (17 April 2011). "Acetylation-dependent regulation of endothelial Notch signalling by the SIRT1 deacetylase". Nature. 473 (7346): 234–238. doi:10.1038/nature09917. ISSN 1476-4687. PMC 4598045. PMID 21499261. Wikidata Q34628594.
- Katie Bentley; Claudio A. Franco; Andrew Philippides; et al. (23 March 2014). "The role of differential VE-cadherin dynamics in cell rearrangement during angiogenesis". Nature Cell Biology. 16 (4): 309–321. doi:10.1038/ncb2926. ISSN 1465-7392. PMID 24658686. Wikidata Q54365519.
