= Ruby Dhal =

British-Afghan poet

- Born: 19 October 1994 (age 31); India
- Citizenship: United Kingdom
- Education: B.A Philosophy from University College London (2015); M.A Philosophy from King's College London (2017)
- Occupations: Poet, entrepreneur and author
- Years active: 2016–present
- Known for: Instapoetry
- Notable work: Between Us (2021); Dear Self (2020); My Hope for Tomorrow (2019)
- Website: rubydhal.com

Ruby Dhal (born 19 October 1994) is a British-Afghan poet, entrepreneur and author based in London. Born in India, Dhal emigrated to the UK at a young age with her family. She started a writing page on Instagram in 2016, eventually becoming a popular "instapoet". She has written 5 books, including 3 best-selling books.

== Early life ==
Dhal started to develop an interest in books, which were originally a form of escapism, and started reading and writing at a young age.

In 2015, she graduated with a bachelor of arts degree in Philosophy from University College London. She completed her master of arts in philosophy in King's College London and graduated in 2017. She lives in London, United Kingdom with her family.

== Career ==
She sold 350 copies of her first poetry book, Memories Unwound, in the first month. She then published A Handful of Stars in May 2019, My Hope For Tomorrow in December 2019, and Dear Self and Between us in 2020 and 2021, respectively. As of 2022, she has sold over 50,000 books, and has more than 500,000 followers on Instagram.

== Bibliography ==
| Title | Publication | ISBN | Ref |
|---|---|---|---|
| Memories Unwound | 2017 | ISBN 9781527205321 | |
| A Handful Of Stars | 2019 | ISBN 9781527240988 | |
| My Hope For Tomorrow | 2019 | ISBN 9781527246324 | |
| Dear Self | 2020 | ISBN 9781916366619 | |
| Between Us | 2021 | ISBN 9781916366657 | |

== Awards and achievements ==
Dhal has been featured on multiple platforms and magazines. She was featured in the Harper's Bazaar India Writer Hotlist 2017, and Utwine.me's list of insta-poets, aspioneer's 20 under 40 and The Love Post's Colours of a Changemaker series' interviews. She also has been interviewed by BBC Radio One and BBC Asian Network.

She was nominated for the Asian Women of Achievement Awards' Young Achiever award 2021.

== See also ==
- Rupi Kaur
- Nikita Gill
