= The Lancet Neurology =

- Discipline: neurology
- Language: English

Publication details
- History: 2002-present
- Publisher: Elsevier (The Netherlands)
- Impact factor: 44.182 (2020)

Standard abbreviations
- ISO 4: Lancet Neurol.

Indexing
- ISSN: 1474-4465

Links
- Journal homepage

The Lancet Neurology is a peer-reviewed scientific journal that was established in 2002 by Elsevier BV.

== Abstracting and indexing ==
Lancet Neurology is abstracted and indexed the following bibliographic databases:

- Science Citation Index Expanded
- Scopus

According to the Journal Citation Reports, the journal has a 2020 impact factor of 44.182.
