= Andrew Goldberg (surgeon) =

British orthopaedic surgeon

Andrew Julian Goldberg
- Education: M.D. from University of London
- Medical career
- Profession: Surgeon
- Field: Orthopaedics
- Sub-specialties: Ankle
- Awards: OBE

Andrew Julian Goldberg OBE, professionally known as Andy Goldberg, is a British orthopaedic surgeon specialising in ankle disorders. He is an honorary consultant orthopaedic surgeon at the Royal National Orthopaedic Hospital in London and Stanmore. He serves as faculty at University College London dealing with ankle and foot surgery. Goldberg runs a research programme focusing on ankle arthritis, the subtalar joint and stem cells. He sits on the AOFAS editorial board for the SAGE Journal, Foot and Ankle Orthopaedics (FAO) as well as the Editorial Committee and Medical Advisory Committee of the National Joint Registry for England & Wales. He has published more than 70 publications and authored the textbooks Surgical Talk, and Surgery: Problems and Solutions, distributed by World Scientific Publishing and is the editor of The Atlas of Ankle Replacements. He consults a startup dealing with improving high heeled shoes.

== Education and training ==
In 1994 Andrew Goldberg graduated from St. Mary's School of Medicine, Imperial College London. In 1997, he was admitted to the Fellowship of the Royal College of Surgeons in Ireland, for the Higher Surgical Training program. In 1998, he attended the Fellowship Royal College of Surgeons of England (FRCS). In 2006 he became a Doctor of Medicine (MD), University of London. In 2006, he completed Certificate of Completion of Specialist Training (CCST).

He was awarded an OBE in the 2011 New Year Honours for services to medicine.
