= Mac Maoláin =

Family name

Mac Maoláin is a Gaelic-Irish surname.

== Overview ==
Mac Maoláin was a surname borne by a number of unrelated families in Gaelic Ireland, anciently found in Breifne, Mide, Brega, Connacht and Ulster.

Now anglicised MacMullan, MacMullen, MacMoylan, McMullen, McMullan, McMellon, and McMullin, this name finds its origins as the collateral form of the root forenames: Maelan (pronounced Moylan); Maolain (pronounced Mullan) and Meallain (pronounced Mellan). The Irish form Mac (pronounced Mec=son of) Maoláin evolved primarily in the provinces of Connacht, Leinster and also in Ulster, where the influx of Scot Irish McMillan who adopted the Irish form McMullen makes separation of the native Irish difficult.

== Mac Maoláin of Maigh Seóla ==
Maelan mac Cathmogha was king of Maigh Seóla (now part of County Galway) at his death in 848, claimed as an ancestor of the southern Ui Briuin family, though historians such as T. F. O'Rahilly thought the connection fictitious. The townland of Cluain Mhic Mhaolain (meadow of McMullan) in Roscommon immortalises the presence of a collateral surname family there.

== Mac Maoláin of Gaileanga Brega ==
A sept of the Gailenga of Brega adopted the surname Mac Maoláin. The Annals of Ulster sub anno 1018 state "Maolán, mac Eccnígh uí Leochain, tigherna Gaileng & Tuath Luicchne (Luigne) uile, do mharbhadh dona Saithnibh" (Maolán, son of Eccnígh uí Leochain, king of Gaileng and all Luigne, was killed by the Saithne). In 1051, Laidcenn mac Maolain h-Uí Leocáin is listed as tigherna Gaileng (king of Gaileng), in 1076 the son of Mac Maolain is recorded in the round tower of Kells and in 1144, Mac Mic Maoláin, tigherna Gaileang Breagh ("the son of Mac Maoláin") was slain. Entries in the Book of Kells page 139 also reference Laidgnean Mac Moelan as laity (alumnus of columcille kells).

== Mac Maoláin Uíbh Echach ==
MacMullan and McMullen families are recorded in the Barony of Uíbh Echach (Clanna-Rory Irish Genealogical Foundation page 16), as Bishops of the Diocese of Connor and Down with the Bishops seat (the seat of MacMullen) identified as the townland of Cabra, parish of Clonduff, ancient territory of Mac Aenghusa (Magennis), Lords of Iveagh.

=== See also ===
- All of the following surnames are cognate, reflecting word roots for the son of a tonsured father:
  - MacMillan (disambiguation)
  - McMillen
  - McMillian
  - McMillin
  - McMillon
  - McMullan
  - McMullen
  - McMullin (disambiguation)
