= The Stinky & Dirty Show =

- Based on: I Stink! series by: Kate McMullan; Jim McMullan
- Developed by: Guy Toubes
- Voices of: Jaden Betts (season 1); Jacob Guenther (season 1); Issac Ryan Brown (season 2); Jet Jurgensmeyer (season 2)
- Opening theme: "The Stinky & Dirty Show!" by Dan Bern
- Composers: Dan Bern; Jake Monaco
- Countries of origin: United States; Ireland
- Original language: English
- No. of seasons: 2
- No. of episodes: 39 (78 segments)

Production
- Executive producers: Guy Toubes; Cathal Gaffney; Gillian Higgins; Darrahh O'Connell
- Running time: 22 minutes
- Production companies: Amazon Studios; Brown Bag Films; Kebab Entertainment; RenderMan; Prana Studios

Original release
- Network: Amazon Prime Video
- Release: January 15, 2015 – August 23, 2019

The Stinky & Dirty Show is an animated television series that premiered on January 15, 2015 on Amazon Prime Video. It is a show about vehicles, and is aimed at teaching kids creative methods for solving problems. A preview was shown alongside two other potential series; Sara Solves It and Buddy: Tech Detective. It ultimately won in view, and the other two shows were scrapped. The series premiered in 2015 with its first season, and ended with an extended second season lasting until summer 2019.

== Plot ==
The series follows the adventures of Stinky the garbage truck and Dirty the backhoe loader, anthropomorphic trucks that learn that when things don't go as expected, asking "what if?" can lead to success. The series is based on the books by Jim and Kate McMullan.

== Characters ==
- Stinky (voiced by Jaden Betts in season 1; Issac Ryan Brown in season 2) – A brown rear loader garbage truck who is the sillier one of the duo. He sees value in garbage where others don't and often provides materials needed to solve a problem, though he often attempts sillier methods such as sneaking in his favorite trash item, moldy melons). Although both Stinky and Dirty hate being clean, Stinky doesn't mind being washed... so long as he retains his signature foul odor.
- Dirty (voiced by Jacob Guenther in season 1; Jet Jurgensmeyer in season 2) – A yellow backhoe loader with a rotating cab who is the more mature one and the brains of the duo. He dreams of becoming the world's best building truck and often thinks more logically in their plans than his best friend. He often draws his ideas on a soft surface on the ground to review ideas, and has a liking for dirt. He has a rock collection and a two-way radio used to call other vehicles for assistance. Although both Stinky and Dirty hate being clean, Dirty has a fear of soap, and often panics if he comes in contact with the fluid.
- Tall (voiced by Wallace Shawn) – A yellow and blue mobile crane who lifts things faster when he laughs. He didn't really laugh in Ha Ha Higher.
- Chip (voiced by Darin De Paul) – A blue excavator with a yellow jackhammer and orange hard hat. His voice sounds funny when he drills.
- Big Ben (voiced by Jonathan Adams in "Road Block", Rick D. Wasserman in all other appearances) – A large green semi flatbed truck.
- Chill (voiced by Billy West) – A pink, cream and powder blue ice cream truck with a large spinning vanilla ice cream cone on his roof and green doors. He speaks in a relaxed manner and is very level headed.
- Mighty (voiced by Jack McGraw) – A black and red tug boat. He tried to drive on land by the help of Stinky and Dirty.
- Sender (voiced by Anna Camp) – A mail truck with pink hubcaps who loves spreading the love. She even sings "You're My Valentine."
- Dumper (voiced by Jane Lynch) – A blue dump truck who likes music and dancing.
- Monster Truck (voiced by Tom Kenny) – A blue and red paranoid monster truck. He is afraid of cheese and melons. (maybe)
- Meg (voiced by Whoopi Goldberg) – A news truck with megaphones who often gives announcements.
- Jumpy (voiced by Kimberly Brooks) – A purple and green stunting sport bike with multiple shows and films.
- Brave (voiced by Andy Richter) – A handsome fire truck who likes being shiny, but was originally afraid of the sound of popcorn popping.
- Chopper (voiced by Jonny Cruz) – A blue and green helicopter who serves as an aerial reporter and delivery man. He helped pour water on the forest fire in Fire Away and Save Brave.
- Digby (voiced by Tom Kenny) – An orange excavator.
- Mixy (voiced by Tom Kenny) – A yellow and white cement truck with a french accent.
- Moby Dee (voiced by Cathy Cavadini) – An orange cargo ship with a yellow crane and cream cabin.
- Smash (voiced by Tish Hicks) – A green and black crawler crane with a wrecking ball. She loves to smash things.
- Fast (voiced by David Shatraw) – A cyan fast-paced diesel locomotive. He is fast-talking.
- Zoom (voiced by Grey Griffin) – An energetic cyan, pink and orange roller coaster.
- Buoys (voiced by Tom Kenny and Cathy Cavadini) – A group of buoys. Two of them have also been named Ding and Ding Ding.
- Queen Justine (voiced by Angelique Perrin) – A cruise ship.
- Spacy (voiced by Mark Hamill) – A Space Shuttle orbiter.
- Linus (voiced by J. P. Karliak) – An orange road marking machine.
- Sweepy (voiced by Mikey Kelley) – A blue and green street sweeper.
- Red (voiced by Joan Cusack) – A red race car.
- Sparks (voiced by Mikey Kelley) – A blue race car with yellow lightning bolts.
- Carla (voiced by Kimberly Brooks) – A friendly cream, black and green ferry. She transports cars to places.
- Steam (voiced by Alex Désert) – A brown steam locomotive.
- Santa Claus (voiced by Roger Craig Smith) – Himself.
- Building Crane (voiced by Darin De Paul) – An orange tower crane.
- Rollin (voiced by Tom Kenny) – A blue and yellow road roller with and orange hard hat.
- Haul (voiced by Gary Anthony Williams) – A purple semi truck who remembers his inventory by song.
- Speedy (voiced by Tom Kenny) – A yellow and orange speedboat.
- Sidekick Semi (voiced by Gary Anthony Williams) – A purple semi truck serving as Jumpy's sidekick in her films.
- Tractor Sue (voiced by Mo Collins) – A green tractor from a neighboring farm.
- Shutter (voiced by Grey Griffin) – A pink and blue bucket truck with a job as a photographer.
- Burger (voiced by Jeff Bennett) – A food truck designed to resemble a hamburger.
- Coupe (voiced by Grey Griffin) – An orange coupe who likes the shade.
- Sedan (voiced by Jeff Bennett) – A blue sedan who likes talking.
- Rover (voiced by Darin De Paul) – A space rover that acts as Spacy's pet, specifically a dog.
- Griswold (voiced by Billy West) – A friendly tan and brown station wagon.
- Toots (voiced by Jeff Bennett) – A pink car with an assortment of gold and silver horns on his body and speaks with a british accent.
- Towpher (voiced by Jeff Bennett) – A green and brown tow truck.
- Miss Bee (voiced by Whoopi Goldberg) – A race car painted in bee stripes.
- Dottie (voiced by David Shatraw) – A green race car with blue and red polka dots.
- Forklifts (voiced by Jeff Bennett, JP Karliak and other assorted actors) – Orange forklifts working in Go City.
- Carry (voiced by Alex Désert) – A red semi truck with an orange car carrier trailer.
- New Cars (voiced by Serenity Reign Brown, Grey Griffin, Jet Jurgensmeyer and Mikey Kelley) – A group of six small childlike minivans. They love to play and like garbage, like Stinky!
- Tanker (voiced by Darin De Paul) – A blue tank truck.

== Episodes ==
=== Season 1 (2015–16) ===
Episode no.	Segment no.	Title	Directed by	Written by	Original release date
1	1a	"Jump at the Dump"	David McCamley	Guy Toubes	January 15, 2015
Jumpy's gear is stuck in the stadium while it's still getting remodeled, so Stinky and Dirty help her set up a new course at the Go City Dump.
1	1b	"Road Block"	Darragh O'Connell	Guy Toubes	January 15, 2015
Stinky and Dirty meet for the first time and combine their talents to save the day when a large boulder falls and blocks the Cloverfield Intersection. Note: This episode was previewed with a different title sequence, end credits, and voice for Stinky, plus other factors in 2015. This is also the only time in season one where Jonathan Adams voices Big Ben.
2	2a	"Mighty Night"	David McCamley	Guy Toubes	September 2, 2016
After Mighty cracks his lamp on Moby Dee's anchor, Stinky and Dirty have to help him guide the larger ship into the harbor.
2	2b	"Water Ways"	David McCamley	Kati Rocky	September 2, 2016
The two set off to deliver a birthday present to Go City Island after Chopper accidentally leaves it behind. The only problem is trying to get across the water when they can't float or fly.
3	3a	"Can You Dig It?"	David McCamley	Adam Beechen	September 2, 2016
After Dirty gets his rear shovel stuck in a pile of dirt, Stinky must figure out how to free him.
3	3b	"Dirty, the Garbage Truck"	David Mc Camley	Rick Suvalle	September 2, 2016
Stinky's hopper gets jammed shut, forcing Dirty to help him with his morning trash route.
4	4a	"Running on Empty"	David McCamley	David Shayne	September 2, 2016
Dirty has to help remove a boulder from a construction site, but he has to find alternative propulsion methods after both he and Stinky run out of fuel.
4	4b	"Rolling Blunder"	David McCamley	Lucas Mills	September 2, 2016
After Dumper accidentally loses an entire load of bowling balls at the bottom of a hill, Stinky and Dirty have to find a way to transport the heavy and rolly objects to the bowling alley downhill.
5	5a	"Concrete Plans"	David Mc Camley	Cate Lieuwen	September 2, 2016
Stinky and Dirty accidentally mess up a wet patch of concrete and have to try and smooth it before Mixy returns.
5	5b	"The Art of Trash"	David McCamley	Kati Rocky	September 2, 2016
Dirty enlists Stinky's help to clean up a park site, but the garbage truck is more interested in keeping some things instead of throwing them away, which come in handy when the last three things that have to be cleaned up are stuck in concrete. But Stinky's lessons about the art of trash leads to a creative solution.
6	6a	"Brave's New Siren"	David Mc Camley	Alex Fox & Rachel Lewis	September 2, 2016
The 2 have to find another way for Brave to alert others when his lightbar and siren accidentally break.
6	6b	"Demolition Dust-Up"	David McCamley	Raye Lankford	September 2, 2016
Dirty, Stinky, Chip and Dumper have to figure how to work in synchronization while clearing up the rubble of a burnt building.
7	7a	"Lost!"	David McCamley	David Shayne	September 2, 2016
When Dirty joins Stinky on a trip to the ranger station, they have to use their other senses when they get lost in fog.
7	7b	"Squeak"	David McCamley	David Shayne	September 2, 2016
Dirty's squeaking shovel is keeping everyone awake, so he and Stinky set off to fix it.
8	8a	"Landlocked"	David McCamley	Guy Toubes	September 2, 2016
After the canal gets filled by a landslide, Stinky and Dirty have to find a way to get Mighty and his buoys to the other side.
8	8b	"Buoy Ya!"	David McCamley	Rick Suvalle	September 2, 2016
After the buoys get blown out to sea, Stinky and Dirty have to guide ships with homemade versions until Mighty returns with the real ones.
9	9a	"Follow That Line!"	David McCamley	Raye Lankford	September 2, 2016
Stinky and Dirty join the racers of the Go City Grand Prix and help them find and follow the purple line marking the racecourse. Note: This is the first episode where Rick D. Wasserman voices Big Ben.
9	9b	"Seeing Red"	David McCamley	Kati Rocky	September 2, 2016
Red keeps getting denied access to a car show due to looking different and enlists Stinky and Dirty to help her stay clean for easy recognition.
10	10a	"Detour"	David McCamley	Rick Suvalle	September 2, 2016
The 2 help Chill on his way to the park for an ice cream party.
10	10b	"Heat & Ice"	David McCamley	Lucas Mills	September 2, 2016
Big Ben has to take an ice sculpture to the Go City Stadium, but the hot summer sun is making it melt. How will Stinky and Dirty fix this jam?

=== Season 2 (2017–19) ===
Episode no.	Segment no.	Title	Directed by	Written by	Original release date
11	1a	"Snow Problems"	David McCamley	Lucas Mills	November 23, 2017
11	1b	"Sleigh Riders"	David McCamley	Adam Beechen	November 23, 2017
12	2a	"Sweepy Clean"	David McCamley	Alex Fox & Rachel Lewis	November 23, 2017
12	2b	"The Broken Road"	David McCamley	Guy Toubes	November 23, 2017
13	3a	"Tree Amigos"	David McCamley	Rick Suvalle	November 23, 2017
13	3b	"Tower Topper"	David McCamley	Guy Toubes	November 23, 2017
14	4a	"Silent But Stinky"	David McCamley & Shane Collins	Guy Toubes	November 23, 2017
14	4b	"Make Way for Sweepy"	David McCamley & Maurizio Parimbelli	Scott Gray	November 23, 2017
15	5a	"Red Light, Red Light"	David McCamley & Shane Collins	Guy Toubes and Rick Suvalle	November 23, 2017
15	5b	"Missing Pieces"	David McCamley & Maurizio Parimbelli	Rick Suvalle	November 23, 2017
16	6a	"Ha Ha Higher"	David McCamley & Shane Collins	Rick Suvalle	November 23, 2017
16	6b	"The Waiting Games"	David McCamley & Maurizio Parimbelli	Guy Toubes	November 23, 2017
17	7a	"Garbage Barge Goodbye!"	David McCamley & Shane Collins	David Shayne	November 23, 2017
17	7b	"Up! Up! Parade!"	David McCamley & Maurizio Parimbelli	Brian Swenlin and Guy Toubes	November 23, 2017
18	8a	"Screen Clean"	David McCamley & Maurizio Parimbelli	Becky Friedman	November 23, 2017
18	8b	"Drive-In Movers"	David McCamley & Shane Collins	Guy Toubes	November 23, 2017
19	9a	"Going Nowhere Fast"	David McCamley & Shane Collins	Jeff Goode	November 23, 2017
19	9b	"The Missing Stink"	David McCamley & Maurizio Parimbelli	Rick Suvalle	November 23, 2017
20	10a	"Love Notes"	Shane Collins	Becky Friedman	February 12, 2018
20	10b	"Love Is in the Air"	Maurizio Parimbelli	David Shayne	February 12, 2018
21	11a	"Miles and Miles of Go City Smiles"	Shane Collins	Patrick Rieger	August 14, 2018
21	11b	"Fast Track"	Maurizio Parimbelli	Adam Beechen	August 14, 2018
22	12a	"Lunch Spot"	Shane Collins	Zac Atkinson	August 14, 2018
22	12b	"No Rest for Red"	Maurizio Parimbelli	Guy Toubes	August 14, 2018
23	13a	"Runaway Rover"	Shane Collins	Jeff Goode	August 14, 2018
23	13b	"The Great Spacey Chase"	Maurizio Parimbelli	Brian Swenlin	August 14, 2018
24	14a	"The Big Splat"	Shane Collins	David Shayne	August 14, 2018
24	14b	"Finding Ding Ding"	Maurizio Parimbelli	Lisa Kettle	August 14, 2018
25	15a	"Traffic Jam-Boree"	Shane Collins	Becky Friedman	August 14, 2018
25	15b	"Late Night with Monster Truck"	Maurizio Parimbelli	Rick Suvalle	August 14, 2018
26	16a	"Missed on My List"	Shane Collins	Lucas Mills	August 14, 2018
26	16b	"Clean Up Catastrophe"	Maurizio Parimbelli	Zac Atkinson	August 14, 2018
27	17a	"The Last Melon"	Shane Collins	Rick Suvalle	March 21, 2019
27	17b	"Little Big Dirty"	Maurizio Parimbelli	Adam Beechen	March 21, 2019
28	18a	"A Sweepy Surprise"	Shane Collins	Lisa Kettle	March 21, 2019
28	18b	"Radio Free Stinky"	Shane Collins	Rick Suvalle	March 21, 2019
29	19a	"Scaredy Brave"	Shane Collins	Becky Friedman	March 21, 2019
29	19b	"Movie Makeover"	Maurizio Parimbelli	Jeff Goode	March 21, 2019
30	20a	"The Never Ending Race"	Shane Collins	Rhonda Smiley & James Hereth	March 21, 2019
30	20b	"Unburied Treasure"	Maurizio Parimbelli	Zac Atkinson	March 21, 2019
31	21a	"The Stinky and Shmirty Show"	Shane Collins	Ron Holsey	March 21, 2019
31	21b	"Moon Chasers"	Maurizio Parimbelli	Guy Toubes	March 21, 2019
32	22a	"Honk, You're It"	Shane Collins	Adam Beechen	March 21, 2019
32	22b	"Smashalot"	Maurizio Parimbelli	Patrick Rieger	March 21, 2019
33	23a	"Seeing Eye Stinky"	Shane Collins	Rick Suvalle	March 21, 2019
33	23b	"Rover All Over"	Maurizio Parimbelli	Amy Wolfram	March 21, 2019
34	24a	"A Case of the Sputters"	Shane Collins & David McCamley	Rhonda Smiley & James Hereth	August 23, 2019
34	24b	"Smash Trash Crash"	Maurizio Parimbelli	Jeff Goode	August 23, 2019
35	25a	"Forklifted"	Unknown	Zac Atkinson	August 23, 2019
35	25b	"New Car Class"	Maurizio Parimbelli	David Shayne	August 23, 2019
36	26a	"Soap Opera"	Unknown	Patrick Rieger	August 23, 2019
36	26b	"Rock and Rollin'"	Maurizio Parimbelli	Jeff Goode	August 23, 2019
37	27a	"Sno Cone Sliders"	Unknown	Alex Fox & Rachel Lewis	August 23, 2019
37	27b	"Trading Wheels"	Maurizio Parimbelli	Lisa Kettle	August 23, 2019
38	28a	"Down Under"	Unknown	Lisa Kettle	August 23, 2019
38	28b	"Monster Breakthrough"	Maurizio Parimbelli	David Shayne (story); Rhonda Smiley & James Hereth (teleplay)	August 23, 2019
39	29a	"Fire Away"	Maurizio Parimbelli	David Shayne	August 23, 2019
39	29b	"Save Brave"	Maurizio Parimbelli	Guy Toubes	August 23, 2019

== Reception ==
Common Sense Media gave the show an overall 5 of 5 stars, noting the positive messaging and role models as providing "inspiring reminders about individual potential".

== Awards and nominations ==
Year	Award	Category	Nominee	Result
2019	Kidscreen Awards	Best Animated Series		Nominated
2019	Daytime Emmy Awards	Outstanding Sound Mixing for a Preschool Animated Program		Nominated
2019	Daytime Emmy Awards	Outstanding Sound Editing for a Preschool Animated Program		Nominated
