= McMullen =

- Pronunciation: Mick-mull-en

Origin
- Meaning: "Son of Maolan"
- Region of origin: Ireland

Other names
- Variant forms: MacMullen, MacMillan

McMullen is a surname with predominantly Irish origins but also with some Scottish history. It derives from root forenames such as: Maolain, Maelan "Hillock" and Meallain "Pleasant". All of these forenames have over time evolved to the collateral "Son of Maolain", anglicised McMullen.

Notable people with the surname include:

- Adam McMullen (1872–1959), 21st governor of Nebraska
- Billy McMullen (born 1980), American football player
- Brett James McMullen (fl. 1980s–2010s), U.S. Air Force brigadier general
- Catherine Cookson (1906–1998), English author who published in the United States under her maiden name Catherine McMullen
- Clements McMullen (1892–1959), U.S. Air Force major general
- Curtis T. McMullen (born 1958), American mathematician
- Darren McMullen (born 1982), Scottish-Australian television and radio personality
- David L. McMullen, British sinologist
- Donald McMullen (1891–1967), British Army major general
- Frances Drewry McMullen (1898–1995), American journalist and school psychologist
- James McMullen (1833–1913), Canadian politician
- John McMullen (disambiguation)
- Mal McMullen (1927–1995), American professional basketball player
- Michael McMullen, South Australian architect, designer of Marryatville, South Australia#The Acacias and many other notable buildings in Adelaide
- Mike McMullen (born 1973), American football player
- Nathan McMullen (born 1988), English stage and TV actor
- Neil C. McMullen (1913–1992), American politician
- Norman MacMullen (1877–1944), British Indian Army general
- Peter McMullen (born 1942), British mathematician
- Phil McMullen (born 1958), music critic from England, founder of both Ptolemaic Terrascope magazine and the Terrastock festivals
- Ramsey MacMullen (1928–2022), American historian and writer
- Richard McMullen (1849–1926), American manufacturer and politician, Governor of Delaware
- Rodney McMullen (born 1961), American businessman, CEO of Kroger
- Sean McMullen (born 1948), Australian science fiction writer
- Scott McMullen (born 1980), American football player
- William McMullen (politician) (1888–1982), Irish trade unionist and politician

== MacMullen ==
- Katelyn MacMullen (born 1995), American actress
- Norman MacMullen (1877–1944), British officer
- Ramsay MacMullen (1928–2022), American historian

== See also ==
- McMullens, British regional brewery in Hertford, England
- McMullen Bros Ltd, Irish distributors of Maxol and Calor Gas fuel products
- Mac Maoláin, an Irish Gaelic surname
