= Michael Preston (American football) =

American football player (born 1989)

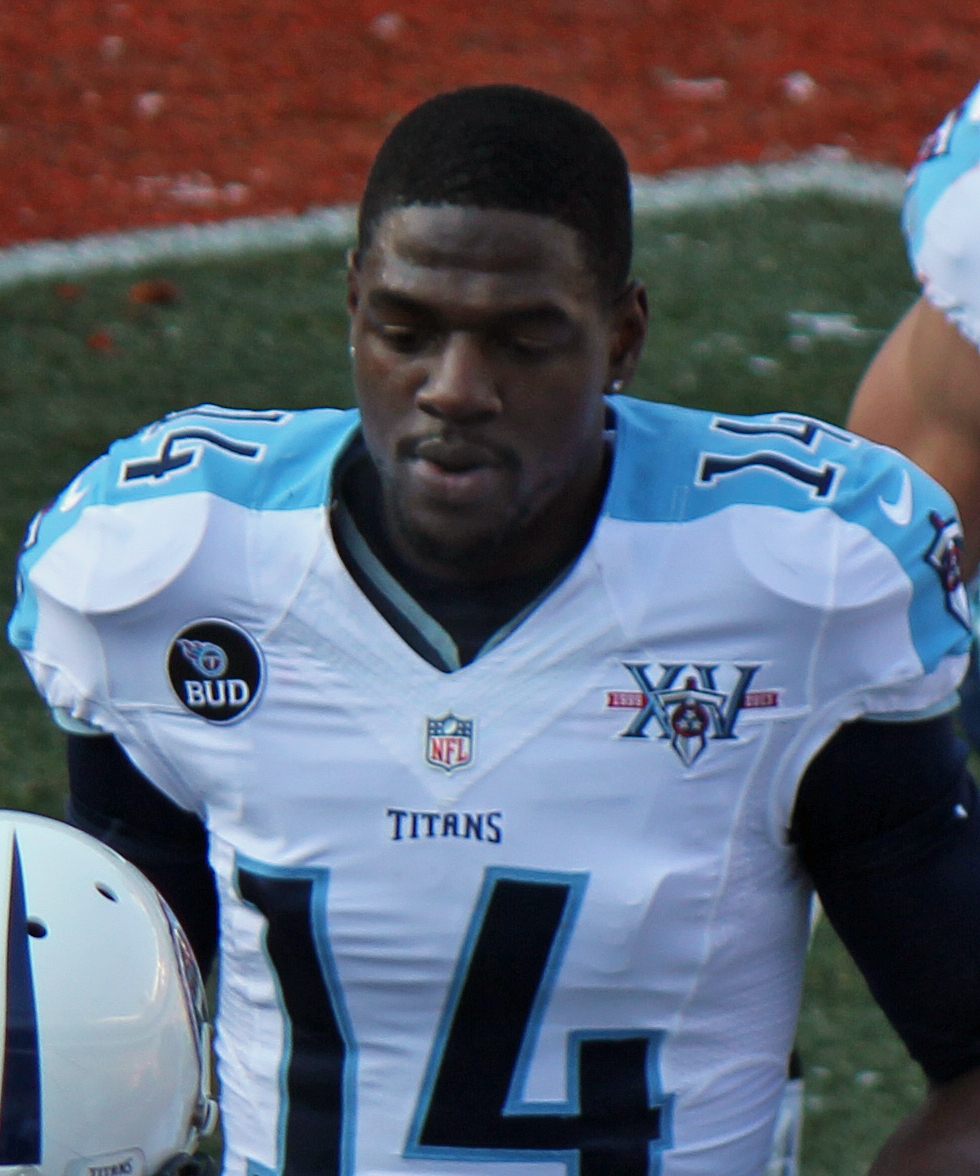
- Preston with the Tennessee Titans in 2013

No. 14, 19
- Position: Wide receiver

Personal information
- Born: June 1, 1989 (age 37); Cleveland, Ohio, U.S.
- Listed height: 6 ft 5 in (1.96 m)
- Listed weight: 206 lb (93 kg)

Career information
- High school: Euclid (Euclid, Ohio)
- College: Heidelberg (2007–2010)
- NFL draft: 2011: undrafted

Career history
- Utah Blaze (2011); Tennessee Titans (2011–2013); San Jose SaberCats (2014); Miami Dolphins (2015)*; Hamilton Tiger-Cats (2016)*; Cleveland Gladiators (2017)
- * Offseason or practice squad member only

Awards and highlights
- Second-team All-Arena (2017); 2× First-team All-OAC (2009, 2010)

Career NFL statistics
- Receptions: 10
- Receiving yards: 96
- Receiving touchdowns: 2
- Stats at Pro Football Reference

Career AFL statistics
- Receptions: 104
- Receiving yards: 1,188
- Receiving touchdowns: 21
- Stats at ArenaFan.com

Michael Preston (born June 1, 1989) is an American former professional football player who was a wide receiver in the National Football League (NFL) and Arena Football League (AFL). He was signed by the Tennessee Titans as an undrafted free agent in 2011. He played college football for the Heidelberg Student Princes.

== Early life ==
Preston played high school football for the Euclid High School Panthers. He did not play on the varsity team until his senior year, when he recorded 12 receptions and two receiving touchdowns. He graduated in 2007.

== College career ==
Preston played at Heidelberg University in Tiffin, Ohio, from 2007 to 2010. He appeared in 39 games, recording 167 receptions for 2,748 yards and 27 touchdowns. He was named first-team All-Ohio Athletic Conference in 2009 and 2010.

== Professional career ==
Preston was rated the 154th best wide receiver in the 2011 NFL draft by NFLDraftScout.com.

Pre-draft measurables
Height	Weight	40-yard dash	10-yard split	20-yard split	20-yard shuttle	Three-cone drill	Vertical jump	Broad jump	Bench press
6 ft 4 in (1.93 m)	204 lb (93 kg)	4.60 s	1.57 s	2.63 s	4.13 s	6.83 s	35 in (0.89 m)	10 ft 0 in (3.05 m)	13 reps
All values from Pro Day

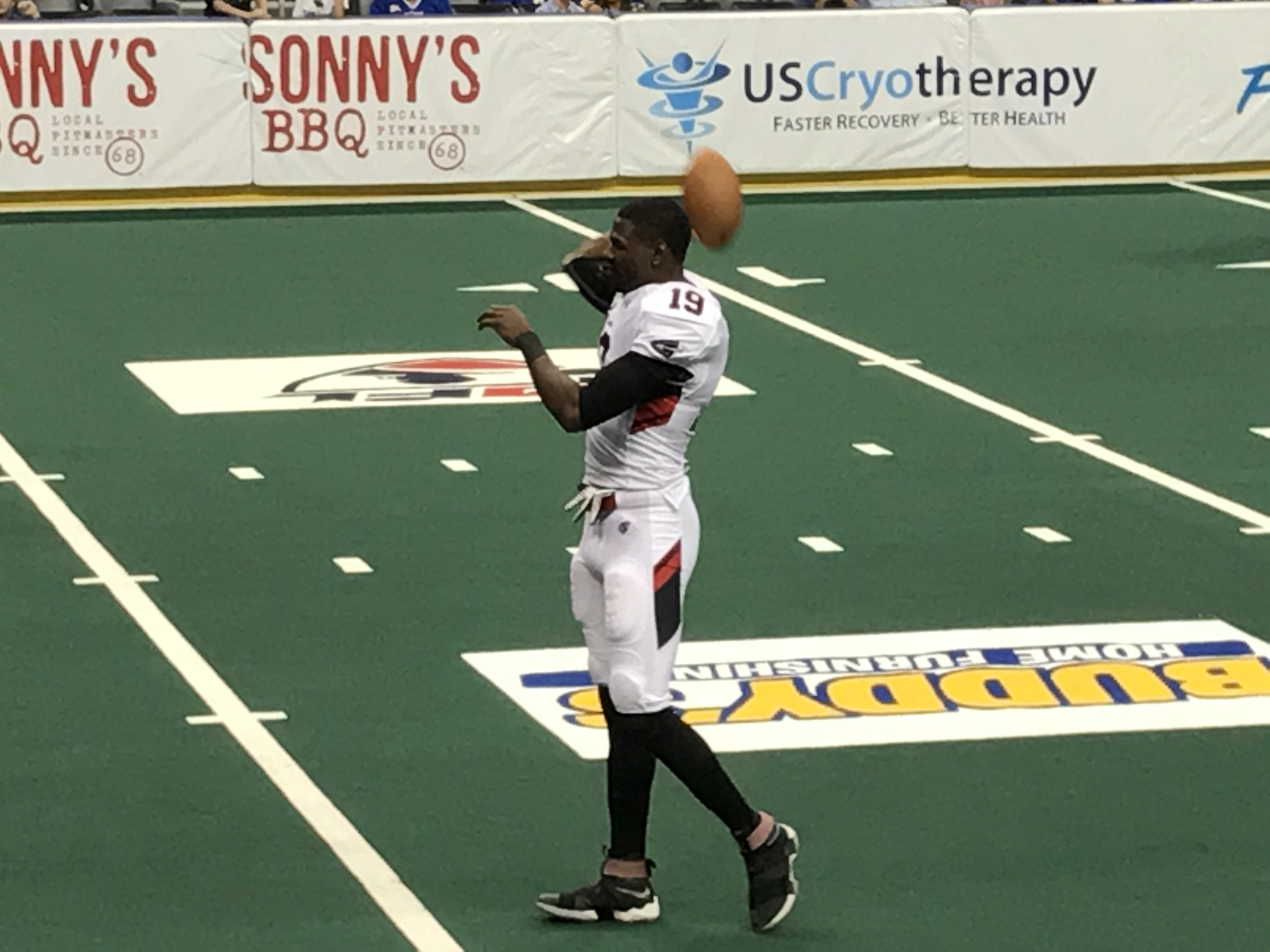
Preston with the Cleveland Gladiators in 2017

Preston signed with the Utah Blaze on June 27, 2011, after going undrafted in the 2011 NFL draft. He played in three games, recording 26 receptions for 319 yards and five touchdowns. He was placed on Other League Exempt by the Blaze on July 26, 2011.

Preston was signed by the Tennessee Titans on July 26, 2011. He was released by the Titans on September 2 and signed to the team's practice squad on September 4, 2011. He was re-signed by the Titans on January 2, 2012. Preston was released by the Titans on August 31 and signed to the team's practice squad on September 1, 2012. He was promoted to the active roster on December 7, 2012. He was waived by the Titans on October 16, 2013, and signed to the team's practice squad on October 16, 2013. Preston was promoted to the active roster on December 7, 2013. He recorded three receptions for 27 yards and the first two touchdown catches of his career on December 15, 2013, against the Arizona Cardinals. He was released by the Titans on August 31, 2014. Preston played in 11 games during his NFL career, catching 10 passes for 96 yards and 2 touchdowns.

Preston signed with the San Jose SaberCats on October 23, 2014.

Preston was signed by the Miami Dolphins on January 7, 2015. He was released by the team on August 23, 2015.

Preston signed with the Hamilton Tiger-Cats on April 20, 2016. He was released by the team on May 3, 2016.

On March 21, 2017, Preston was assigned to the Cleveland Gladiators. He earned second-team All-Arena honors in 2017.
