= McMullan =

McMullan is a Gaelic surname. Notable people with the surname include:

- Bob McMullan, Australian politician
- Chelsea McMullan, Canadian documentary filmmaker
- David McMullan (b. 1901), Irish footballer (Liverpool FC)
- Hayes McMullan (1902–1986), American Delta blues singer, guitarist and songwriter
- Jackie McMullan, Provisional Irish Republican Army member
- James McMullan, Irish-Canadian illustrator
- Jim McMullan, actor
- Jimmy McMullan, Scottish soccer player
- John McMullan (1933–1994), American footballer
- John McMullan (cricketer) (1893–1967), New Zealand cricketer
- Lyle McMullan, editor and newspaper founder
- Kate McMullan (born 1947), American children's book author
- Kevin McMullan, acoustic guitarist
- Patrick McMullan, photographer
- Paul McMullan (footballer, born 1984), Scottish footballer (Heart of Midlothian FC)
- Paul McMullan (footballer, born 1996), Scottish footballer (Celtic FC)
- Paul McMullan (journalist) (born 1963), British journalist

== See also ==
- McMullan Bros. Limited, Irish oil company
