= McMullin =

McMullin may refer to:

- McMullin, Missouri
- McMullin (surname)
- Evan McMullin, candidate for president of the United States in the 2016 United States presidential election
