= Frances Drewry McMullen =

American journalist

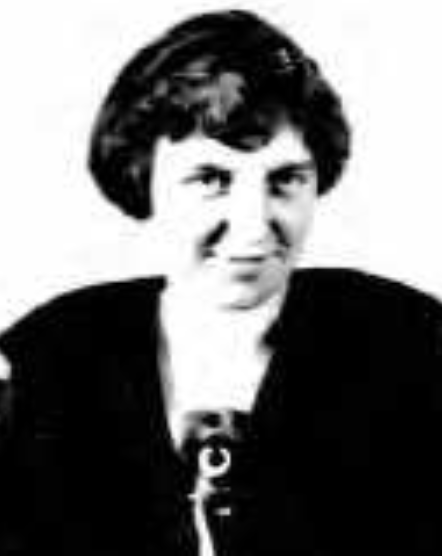
- From her 1921 passport application
- Born: Martha Frances Drewry; March 20, 1898; Petersburg, Virginia, U.S.
- Died: September 11, 1995 (aged 97); West Orange, New Jersey, U.S.
- Occupation(s): Journalist, educational psychologist

Martha Frances Drewry McMullen (March 20, 1898 – September 11, 1995) was an American journalist and educational psychologist. She was on the Sunday staff of The New York Times. She also contributed to national periodicals in the 1920s and 1930s. She later became an educational psychologist in New Jersey.

== Early life and education ==
Martha Frances Drewry was born in Petersburg, Virginia, the daughter of William Francis Drewry and Bessie Seabury Drewry. Her father was a physician, president of the American Psychiatric Association, and superintendent of Virginia's Central State Hospital. She graduated from Randolph Macon Women's College in 1918, and earned a master's degree from Columbia University Graduate School of Journalism. With a Pulitzer scholarship awarded in 1921, she pursued further studies at the London School of Economics.

In midlife, McMullen returned to school, earning another master's degree in child development from Teachers College, Columbia University. Her master's thesis was titled "The Meaning of the IQ as Interpreted in a Progressive School Conducted at Boston Country Day School" (1935).

== Career ==
McMullen was the first woman political writer on the staff of the Baltimore Sun. She was a member of the Sunday staff of The New York Times and a contributor to Current History, Everybody's Magazine, The Woman's Journal, The World's Work, and The North American Review. Later in life, she was a school psychologist in Millburn, New Jersey, and at Buxton Country Day School. She was active on the Board of Trustees of the Millburn Public Library.

== Publications ==
=== In The New York Times ===
McMullen covered art exhibits and suburban concerns, including hunting, shooting, commuting, and swimming pools. She also wrote profiles of presidents, and features about totem poles and the history of the Christmas card.

- "Vivid Hunting Tales are Told in Bronze" (1926)
- "Americans Again March on Yorktown" (1926)
- "Dean of Mural Painters is Young at 78" (1926)
- "Many Presidents Devoted to the Joy of Sport" (1926)
- "Totem Poles Are Now to be Guarded" (1926)
- "Bay of the Foxhound is Heard Nearby" (1926)
- "Night Workers Ever on the Increase" (1926)
- "Christmas Card Reaches Gay Eightieth Birthday" (1926)
- "By Motor Boat These Commuters Come" (1927)
- "The Clay Pigeon Slaughter" (1927)
- "The Old Swimmin' Hole is Born A New" (1930)
- "A New Cloth Hall for Ypres" (1931)
- "Versatile Washington an Engineer of Vision" (1931)

=== In The Woman Citizen or The Woman's Journal ===
McMullen wrote multiple feature articles each year for The Women's Journal between 1924 and 1931. Many of her contributions were profiles, with subjects including Anna Pennybacker, Minnie Maddern Fiske, Mary Belle Sherman, Anna Adams Gordon, Bertha Brainard, Erna Fergusson, congresswomen Ruth Baker Pratt, Ruth Hanna McCormick, and Ruth Bryan Owen, clergy including Helen Barrett Montgomery, Mabel Madeline Southard, and Caroline Bartlett Crane, and businesswomen. She interviewed Amelia Earhart in 1929, and Margaret Mead in 1930.

- "Mrs. Percy V. Pennybacker" (1924)
- "Mrs. Fiske" (1924)
- "The National Park Lady" (1924)
- "The W. C. T. U." (1925)
- "Women in the Pulpit" (1925)
- "Better Business Women in a Better Business World" (1925)
- "The Tree Lady" (1925)
- "Old America" (1926)
- "Mary Dillon, 'Gas Man'" (1926)
- "Sign-less Town" (1926)
- "One Way to Make Americans" (1926)
- "'Ask Miss Fergusson'" (1927)
- "Folk Dances for Fox Trots" (1927)
- "Edna Albert, Businesswoman" (1928)
- "The Three Ruths in Congress" (1928)
- "Making the Best of Garbage" (1928)
- "Bertha Brainard, Radio Producer" (1928)
- "The Best 'Man' for the Job" (1928)
- "Panhellenic House" (1929)
- "The Policewoman's Beat" (1929)
- "Seven Sisters" (1929)
- "The Kimono Lady" (1929)
- "The First Women's Air Derby" (1929)
- "Ruth Dean, Landscape Architect" (1929)
- "The Junior League at Home" (1930)
- "Mrs. Draper, Home Stylist" (1930)
- "'Going Native' for Science" (1930)
- "Women and Ticker Tape: A Year After the Crash" (1930)
- "Welcome, Stranger!: The Friendly Service of Travelers' Aid" (1930)
- "Rose Fallon, Florist" (1931)

=== Other periodicals ===
- "Out of Collapse, a New Vienna" (1922, Current History)
- "Belgium Winning by Hard Work" (1922, Current History)
- "The Champion Prize Winner" (1925, Everybody's Magazine)
- "A Youth with an Ancient Craft" (1925, Everybody's Magazine)
- "A Sightless Cleanup Man" (1925, Everybody's Magazine)
- "Liberty or Death" (1926, Everybody's Magazine)
- "Dr. Florence Rena Sabin" (1926, The World's Work)
- "Belles at the Bargain Counters" (1931, The North American Review)
- "New Jobs for Women" (1932, The North American Review)

== Personal life ==
Drewry married fellow journalist Joseph Harold McMullen in 1923; he later became a stockbroker. The McMullens had two daughters, Betty and Martha, and a son, Dan. Her husband died in 1968, and her son died in 1992. She died in 1995, at the age of 97, in West Orange, New Jersey.
