= Euclid High School =

Location
- 711 East 222nd Street; Euclid, Ohio 44123; United States; 41°35′44″N 81°31′32″W

Information
- Type: Public, Coeducational
- Established: 1868
- School district: Euclid City School District
- Principal: Corey Russell
- Teaching staff: 102.50 (FTE)
- Grades: 9–12
- Student to teacher ratio: 16.13
- Campus: Urban suburb
- Colors: Navy blue and gold
- Athletics conference: Greater Cleveland Conference
- Team name: Panthers
- Website: www.euclidschools.org/o/euclidhigh

Euclid High School is a public high school in Euclid, Ohio, United States, a suburb of Cleveland in the northeast corner of Cuyahoga County. Originally named Euclid Senior High School, it was constructed in 1949 to replace the Euclid Central High School and Shore High School facilities. The school serves a community of approximately 49,000 residents, offering a wide range of programs from vocational education to college preparatory.

== History ==
Euclid High School was established in 1868 and was housed in a facility on School Street. The first high school building was built in 1894 and remained in service until 1913, when two new schools, Shore and Central, were completed. Both schools housed high school students in part of their respective buildings, but neither school was exclusively a high school.

The current facility opened in late 1949 as Euclid Senior High School and had 1,850 students in grades 10–12 during the first school year. The plan for a single high school in Euclid had been the idea of superintendent Russell Erwine as far back as 1930, though plans were not finalized until 1945. The original building was designed in the shape of an "E", and has had expansions in 1957, 1966, and 1972 as enrollment grew to as many as 3,000 students in three grades between 1965 and 1975. The building includes a swimming pool, two gymnasiums, an indoor track facility, weight rooms, a little theater, auditorium, planetarium, and a fully functional, self-contained library. Currently the school is undergoing extensive renovations including the demolition of the center section of the school leaving only the north and south wings of the original " E " structure intact, while an entirely new school is being constructed between the two remaining wings. Additionally a new football stadium was constructed as well as new soccer fields and a new girls softball field. All construction is scheduled to be completed by the end of 2022.

== Curriculum ==
Euclid's vocational programs includes automotive body repair, commercial art and cosmetology. Its technology program offers training in Cisco Systems and computer information systems. A major distinction in Euclid's format was the incorporation of Knowledgeworks Foundation, a school program funded by Microsoft founder Bill Gates. Essentially, the program divides Euclid High into six smaller 'schools'. This includes the School of Science, Technology, Engineering, and Math, International Academy of Accelerated Achievement, The Professional Path, Euclid Academy of the Arts, Academy of Intellectual and Interpersonal Development, and Business and Communications School. Each section of the school focuses on its area of concentration. Yet due to enrollment changes in the district, (as report by Euclid Sun journal) these small schools ceased operations in the 2009–2010 school year, and consolidate back to the single high school concept.

In the 1960s, it was one of the regions first to teach computer programming with its own IBM mainframe.

== Activities ==
Euclid High School activities include: Student Council, class cabinet, Key Club, The Euclidian (yearbook), The Survey (newspaper), The Eucuyo (literary arts journal), fall play, "Big Show" spring musical, spring play, Choral Masters, Varsity Chorale, choir, marching band, jazz band, orchestra, drill team, academic teams, National Honor Society, audio/visual club, poetry club, D.A.R.E., S.A.D.D., peer mediation, Future Educators of America, NJROTC, and The Asian Pop Culture Club.

Euclid High School also sponsors 21 varsity sports: baseball, boys/girls basketball, cheerleading, football, JROTC Raiders, boys/girls soccer, boys/girls tennis, softball, swimming and diving, track and field, cross country, volleyball, wrestling

== Athletics ==
=== State championships ===
- Baseball - 1963, 1982
- Wrestling – 1949, 1952, 1958

Euclid High School's most successful sports program since 1948 is baseball winning a total of 39 conference titles in the previous 60 years, with Ohio Hall of Fame coach Paul Serra leading the team during the 1960s, 70s and 80s.

== Notable alumni ==
- Jim Bonfanti, rock drummer co-founder of The Raspberries, had music honored in the Guardians of the Galaxy soundtrack. Graduated 1966.
- Jessica Beard, world champion track and field sprinter. Graduated 2007.
- Caisja Chandler (born 2000), American sprinter
- Richard Cowan, operatic bass-baritone. Graduated 1976.
- Tony Fisher, Mr. Football Ohio 1997, University of Notre Dame graduate class of 2002, 5 seasons in NFL. Graduated 1998.
- Rayshaun Kizer, professional football player in the Arena Football League
- Joe Lovano, jazz musician and tenor saxophone player. Graduated 1971.
- Paul McFadden, professional football player in the NFL. Graduated 1979.
- Tom Murphy, professional baseball player in Major League Baseball (MLB)
- Joe Nossek, professional baseball player in MLB. Graduated 1959.
- Monica Potter, actor. Graduated 1989.
- Michael Preston, NFL player.
- Eric Singer, drummer for Kiss, Alice Cooper, Lita Ford, Badlands, Eric Singer Project
- Robert Smith, professional football player in the National Football League (NFL). Graduated 1990
- Demetrius Treadwell, basketball player for Hapoel Gilboa Galil of the Israeli League Liga Leumit
- Don Vicic, former professional football player for the BC Lions
- Roger Zelazny, writer and poet
