= Euclid Trucks =

Former American heavy equipment manufacturer

- Founded: 1909
- Defunct: January 1, 2004
- Fate: Dissolved
- Successor: Hitachi
- Products: Dump trucks, loaders and wheel tractor-scrapers
- Parent: Hitachi

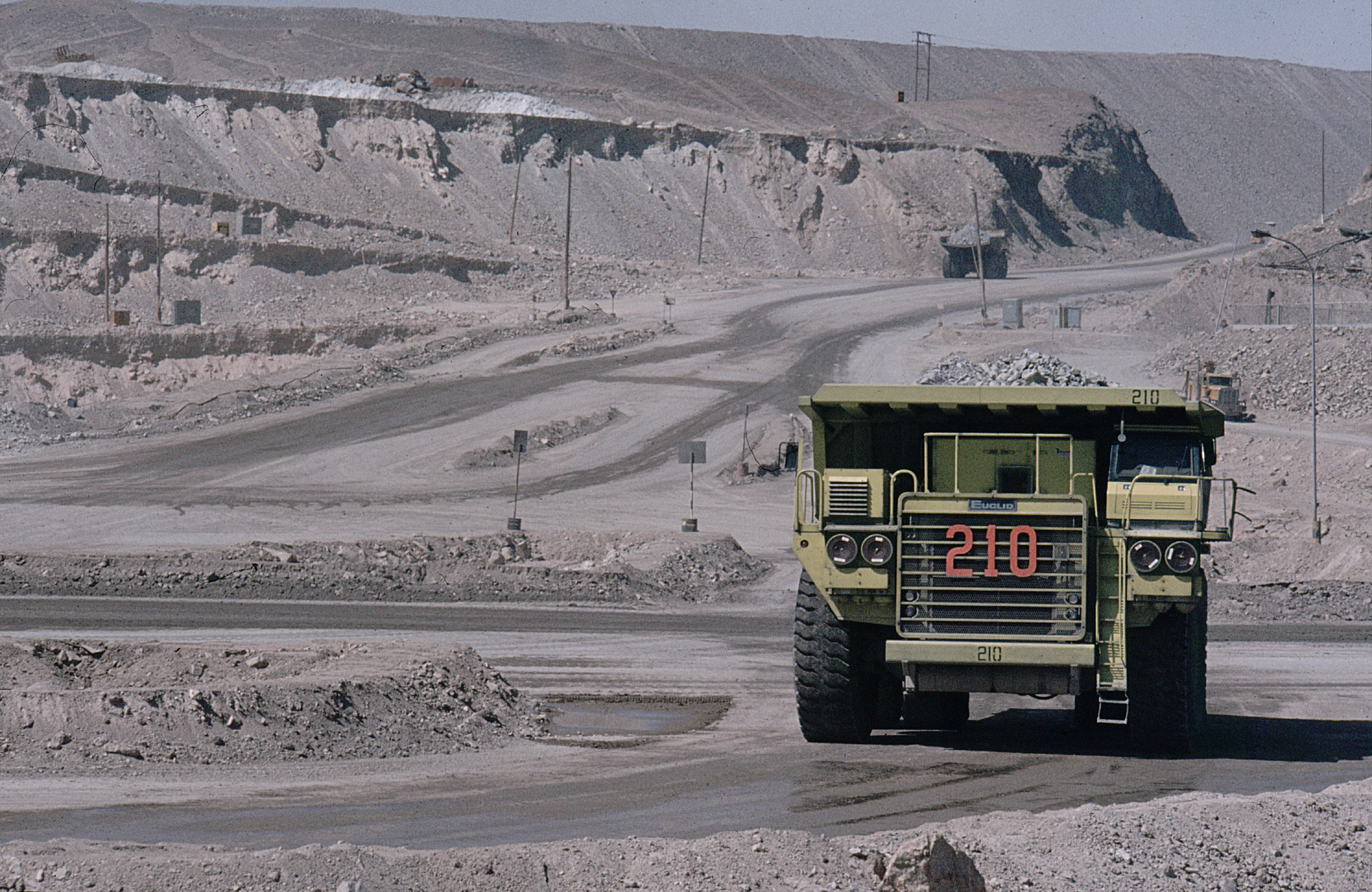
Euclid truck in use at Chuquicamata copper mine in 1984

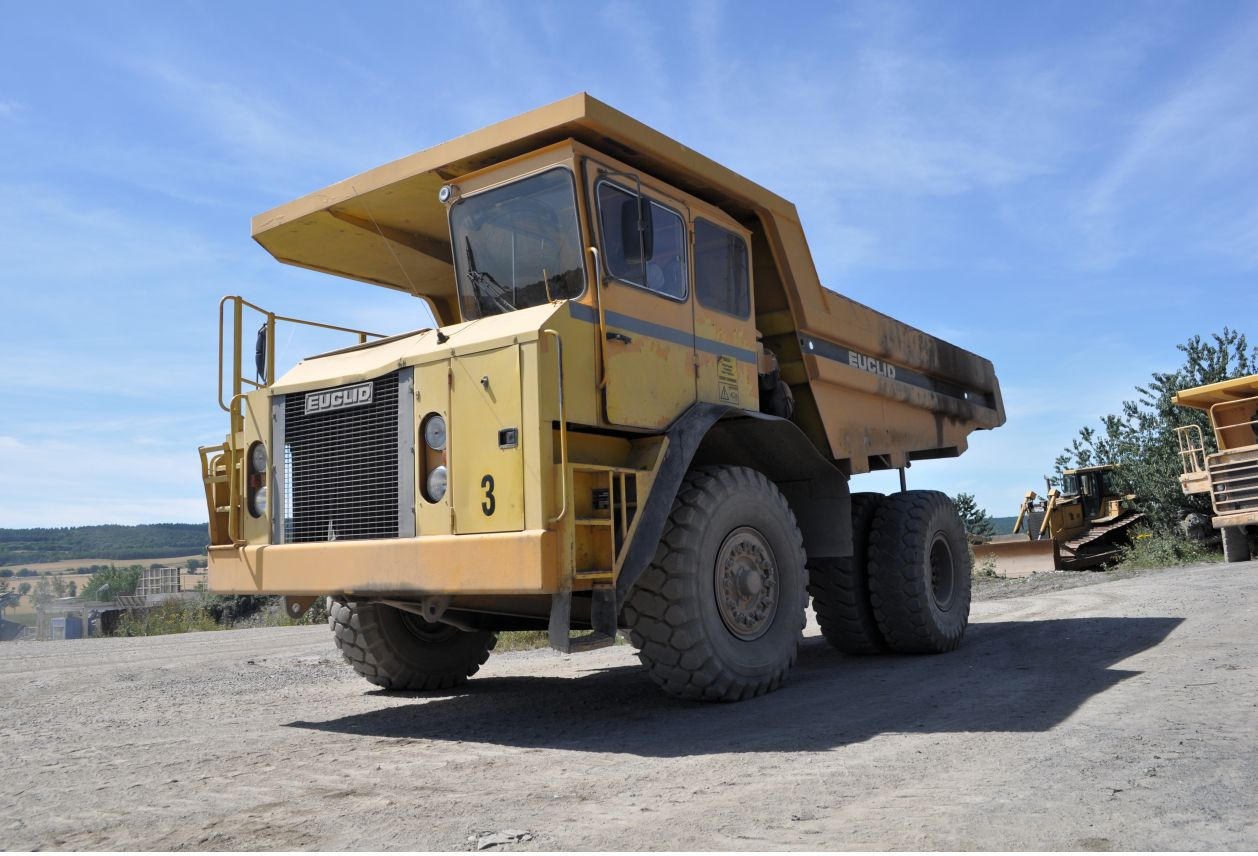
Euclid truck at a quarry in Poland (2013)

The Euclid Trucks was a manufacturer which specialized in heavy equipment for earthmoving, particularly dump trucks, loaders and wheel tractor-scrapers. Known for its distinctive bright 'highlite green' paint scheme, it operated in the United States from the 1920s to the 1950s, when it was purchased by General Motors. The firm was later bought by Hitachi Construction Machinery.

== History ==
=== Founding ===
The Euclid Company of Euclid, Ohio, made specifically designed off-road heavy haulers, compared with other companies that modified on-road trucks for off-road earth-hauling.

The Euclid Crane and Hoist Co., formed in 1909 and owned by George A. Armington and his five sons, had become a large, respected and profitable operation by the early 1920s. It introduced the Euclid Automatic Rotary Scraper in 1924, soon followed by the Euclid Wheeler (wheeled) scraper. Those earthmoving products were conceived by George's eldest son, Arthur, who steered the company into the earthmoving field. The two models of scrapers were well received, and a third model, the Euclid Contractors Special, designed to cope with hard ground, was even more successful. In 1926, the Armingtons formed Euclid Inc., the Road Machinery Division of Euclid Crane and Hoist, to cater especially to the off-road hauler market.

Arthur and his father, George, had built a successful prototype crawler, and tested it on the family farm, but the crawler design was dropped, for reasons unknown. Large public works construction programs in 1927 and 1928 required large excavations, thus enhancing the success of the Euclid Road Machinery division.

Euclid produced crawler wagons on tracks (similar to Athey Wagons) known as Euclid Tu-Way haulers. The crawler track speed restriction was a problem, and the next version used steel wheels for improved speed. George Armington Jr was a keen hydraulics designer, and produced the first hydraulic Euclid dumpers circa 1930.

=== Great Depression ===
The Great Depression did not affect Euclid greatly, and the expansion of the earthmoving portion of the Euclid business led to the incorporation of the Euclid Road Machinery Co., on July 11, 1931. That company remained a subsidiary of Euclid Armington Corp, until January 1, 1933, when the companies were separated. Euclid Road Machinery became a producer of fast, off-road earthmoving haulers.

Euclid produced its first specially designed, 7-yard (6.4 m)-long, off-road dump truck, the Model 1Z, in January 1934. It was powered by a 100 horsepower (75 kW) Waukesha gasoline engine, and used an extremely heavy-duty, Euclid rear axle, fitted with a new 17.5 x 24 tire, which had just been released by the tire industry. Mack had produced a 14-yard (13 m)-long, heavy duty off-road hauler in 1931, specifically for the Boulder Dam project (the Model AP Super-Duty), but it was basically a beefed-up, road-going, chain-drive AC Bulldog Mack.

The next Euclid design was an articulated, tractor/trailer, in the style of the Caterpillar DW10 bottom dumper. It was known as the Model Z or ZW.

=== Company expansion ===
Euclid made thousands of off-road haulers and scrapers. Improved and larger designs helped it become a significant international corporation by the early 1950s. In 1950, a separate UK-based company, Euclid Great Britain, was established. A factory specialising in off-road haulers was opened in Motherwell, Scotland. In 1953, the Euclid Corporation was purchased by General Motors, in what the leaders of both companies saw as an advantageous deal, given their complementary product lines. The deal came about due to GM's desire to enter the earthmoving manufacturing field, and the realisation by the Armington family that a GM takeover would provide capital and enhanced design capability. The GM takeover was announced on September 30, 1953, with an official takeover date of January 1, 1954.

Arthur Armington died suddenly in 1937, leading to a stumble in Euclid's fortunes. George Armington died in 1954, at the age of 89, after overseeing the sale of Euclid to GM. Sons Stuart & Everett Armington retired in 1953, and George Jr retired in 1958. The youngest son Ray, the last Armington, retired in 1960 after seven years as General Manager of GM's Euclid Division.

The 1950s and 1960s were good years for Euclid Trucks. In 1951, the company produced the industry's first 50-ton, three-axle dump truck, with twin-engined Cummins power. During that period, Euclid produced two- and three-axle dump trucks with capacities up to 105 tons. Some of the largest three-axle units were used as tractors for even larger end-dump, and bottom-dump haulers.

=== Antitrust lawsuit ===
In 1959, the Department of Justice, led by Attorney General William P. Rogers, initiated an antitrust suit, under the Clayton Act, against General Motors Corporation. It charged that GM was too dominant, and its business methods stifled competition in the off-road hauler and earthmoving market. GM fought the suit for eight years, finally surrendering in 1968 and agreeing to sell its Euclid Division.

After the sale of Euclid to White Motor Corporation, GM formed the Terex brand. Under the sale agreement with White, GM was not allowed to produce trucks in competition with White for four years – from July 1, 1968, to July 1, 1972. GM could produce off-road haul trucks but could not sell them in the US. GM equipment dealers in the US were offered a franchise deal from White to sell the White/Euclid line of trucks for a period of four years. The international Euclid dealerships were still owned by GM, thus forcing White to form all-new international dealerships. GM produced haul trucks in the 1968-1972 period that it had developed during its ownership of Euclid, using plants in Canada and Scotland that it had been allowed to keep. They were sold under the name Terex, but were essentially the same as the Euclid line.

The Euclid Company lost its prominence after the sale to White, and never achieved the standing that it enjoyed before the GM acquisition.

=== Sale ===
In August 1977, White sold Euclid, Inc., to Daimler Benz of Stuttgart, Germany and, in January 1984, Daimler-Benz sold Euclid to one of Euclid’s former competitors, Clark Equipment Company, after which it became part of the Clark Michigan Company, as Clark’s construction machinery division was then called. The following April, Clark formed a 50/50 joint venture with Volvo of Sweden, now known as Volvo Construction Equipment, to manufacture Volvo, Michigan and Euclid construction equipment under the name of VME Group NV. VME underwent several rather confusing reorganisation of its American and European operations, culminating in 1991 in the creation of a VME North Americas unit, to handle only the Euclid lines.

In December 1993, VME North America entered into a joint venture of its own with Hitachi Construction Machinery Co. Ltd., called Euclid-Hitachi Heavy Equipment. Hitachi, a manufacturer of hydraulic construction machinery such as excavators and cranes, gradually increased its share of the joint venture until it owned 100% of the organization by 2000. Hitachi obtained Euclid to fill the gap in their ability to offer a complete mining package, because mining excavators and dump trucks are usually needed in combination.

During the transitional phase Hitachi utilized the Euclid brand name on some models and parts. Production was moved from Euclid, Ohio, to Guelph in Ontario, Canada. The trucks were are equipped with mufflers and computer controllers to meet environmental requirements for sound and exhaust emissions.

Smaller construction trucks using older technology, of 32 tons and 36 tons capacity previously manufactured in Poland under license from VME (Volvo Michigan Euclid) are being built in India by Telcon, a joint venture between Tata and Hitachi Construction Machinery Co. Ltd.

=== Demise ===
Euclid-Hitachi became Hitachi Construction Truck Manufacturing. On January 1, 2004, the Euclid name had been phased out ending 80 years of the Euclid name on construction machinery.

== Developments ==
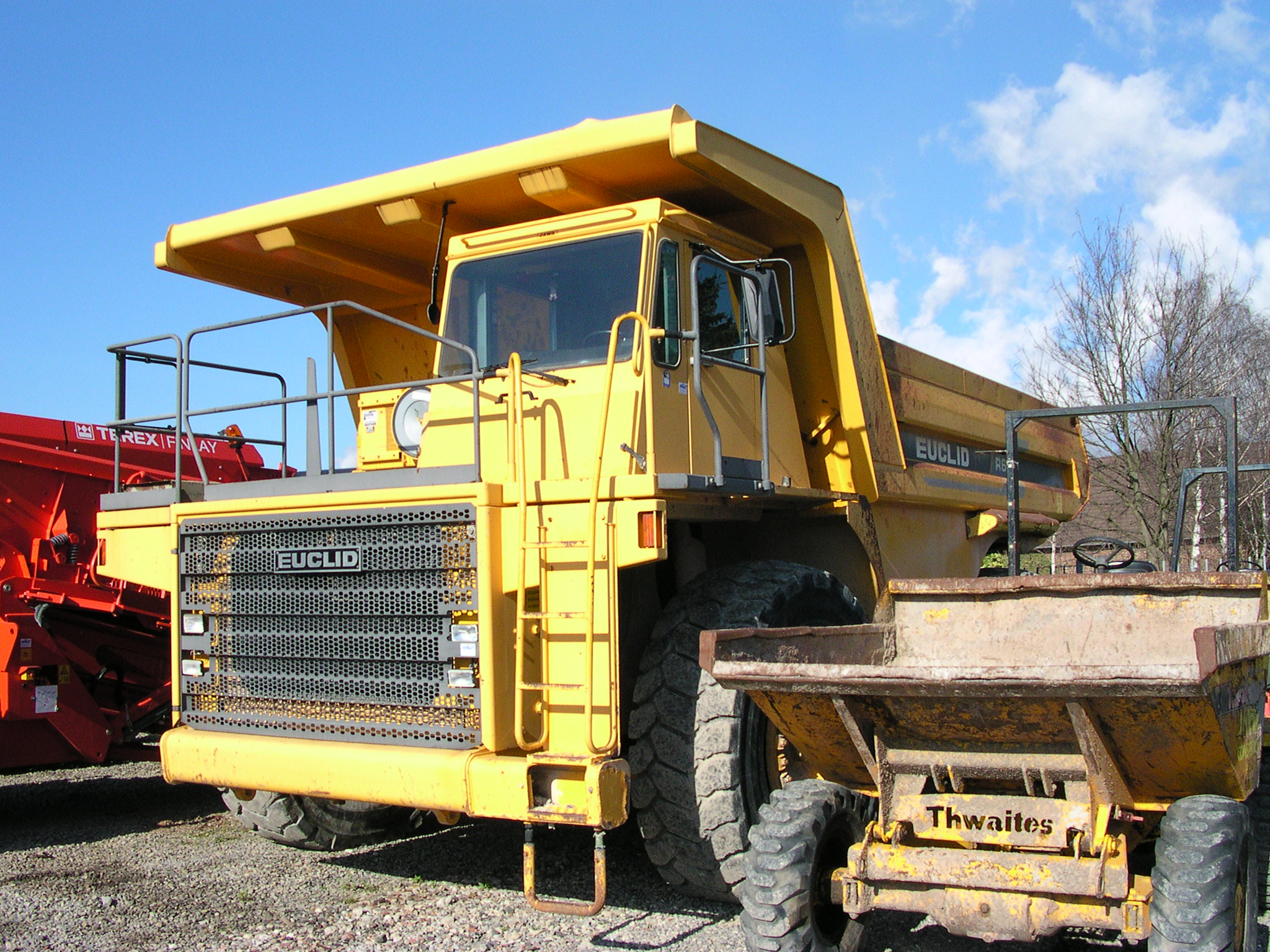
A Euclid R60 Dump truck

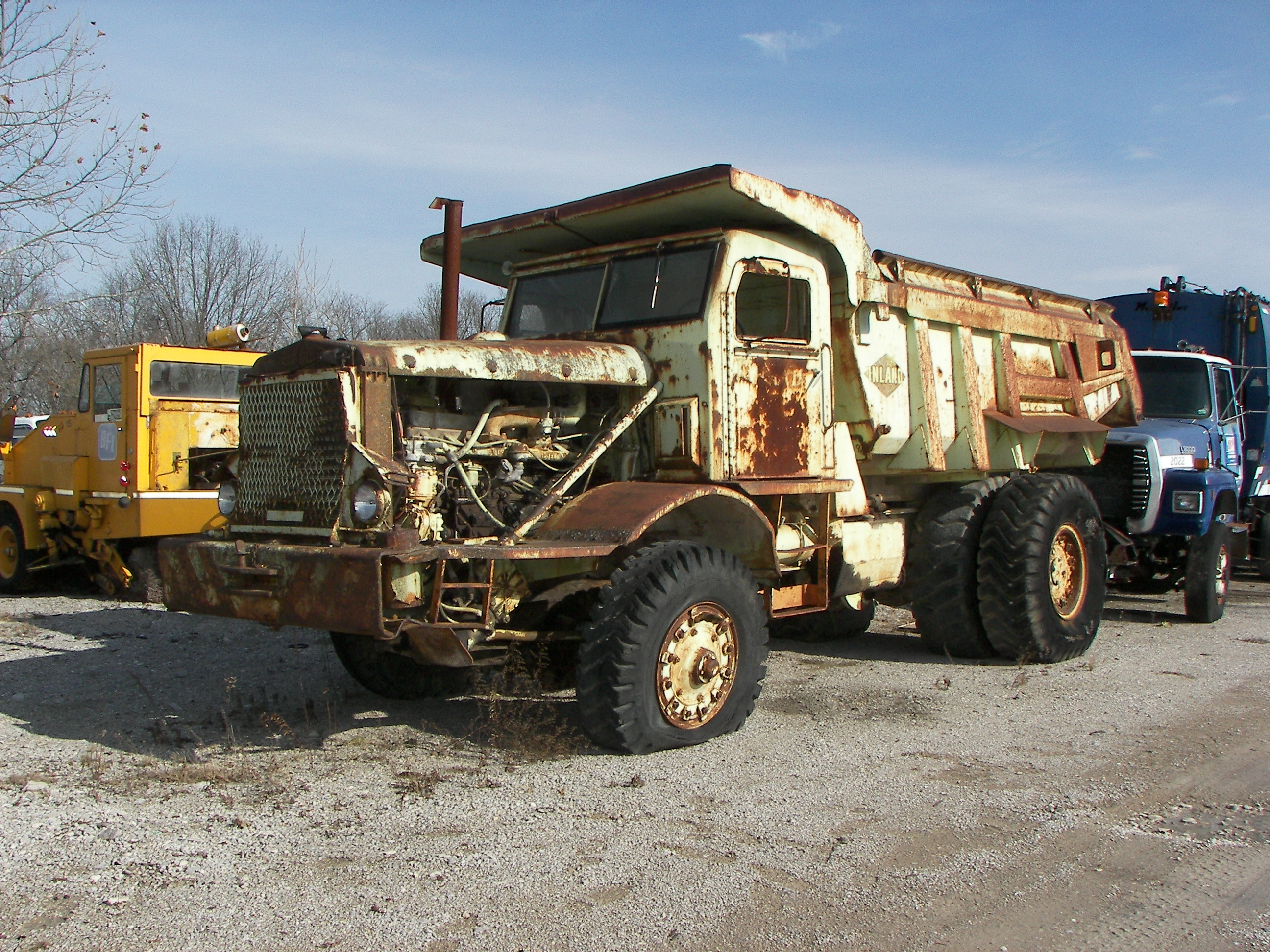
Euclid R24 Dump Truck

The Euclid company of Euclid, Ohio, was synonymous with off-road haul trucks, and earthmoving equipment such as bottom dumpers, and to a lesser extent, scrapers, in the 1950s. As described in Herbert L. Nichols' "Moving the Earth", now in its 5th edition, Euclid was everywhere.

GM's work on heavy duty automatic transmissions during World War II had produced the Allison heavy duty automatic in 1945. Euclid was the first to use this transmission in heavy duty off-road dump trucks in the late 1940s. It met the need for an industrial transmission with huge power capacity, as engine sizes were increasing to the point where transmissions could not cope with the power.

Euclid pioneered the use of twin engines (Twin-Power) in a bottom dumper (model 50FDT-102W), in November 1948. Their first Twin-Power scraper prototype (model 51FDT-13SH) appeared in February 1949, and production model Twin-Power scrapers were released in 1950 (GM powered model 68FDT-17SH – and the Cummins powered model, 66FDT-16SH). Prior to GM's purchase of Euclid, the engine preferred by Euclid was Cummins diesels, with GM's 2-stroke Detroit Diesel offered as an option. When GM purchased Euclid, it led to dismay at Cummins, because of loss of an important customer. The takeover led to GM engines being the engine of choice, but the Cummins option was still available, although Cummins-engined trucks sold in lower numbers after the GM takeover.

Ranging from 10 to 62 ton capacity, the giants roamed strip mines, heavy construction sites and quarries worldwide. Euclid's end dumpers reached 210 tons in capacity in the 1980s.

Euclid trucks were usually loaded by cable-operated crawler shovels and draglines of other manufacturers, but Euclid also developed mobile belt loaders to load its bottom dump trucks.

Euclid also pioneered the high speed tractor belly dumper. This combined an off-road tractor (with a fifth wheel) and a very large, up to 100-ton capacity, belly dump trailer. This machine, descended from bottom dump wagons drawn by crawler tractors, discharged its load through longitudinal gates in the bottom of the trailer. The first such trucks carried 13 cubic yards, but by the early 1960s capacities reached 110 tons.

Euclid also manufactured wheeled tractor scrapers, such as were invented by R. G. LeTourneau (later to become LeTourneau-Westinghouse, after the purchase of R. G LeTourneau, Inc. by Westinghouse Air Brake Company) and now almost singularly manufactured by Caterpillar. Euclid's tractor scrapers were powered by the same tractors as their belly dumps. Euclid was the first major manufacturer to commercialize the articulated rubber tired loader, which is the current mainstay of many heavy equipment manufacturers, particularly Caterpillar.
