= McMillin =

McMillin is a surname. Notable people with the surname include:

- Benton McMillin (1845–1943), Governor of Tennessee
- Bo McMillin (1895–1952), American football coach
- Challace McMillin (1942–2020), American football coach at James Madison University
- Corky McMillin (1929–2005), American racer
- David McMillin (born 1984), American singer
- George McMillin (1889–1983), 38th and final Naval Governor of Guam
- James McMillin (1914–2005), American Olympic rower
- John Ernest McMillin (1884–1949), member of the Canadian House of Commons
- John S. McMillin (1855–1936), American lawyer and businessman
- Judson McMillin (born 1977), member of the Indiana House of Representatives
- Marie McMillin (born 1902), American aviator

== See also ==
- Crocker-McMillin Mansion-Immaculate Conception Seminary, National Register of Historic Places site in New Jersey
- McMillin Bridge, bridge in Washington state
- McMillin Observatory, observatory in Ohio
- Johnson–McMillin syndrome, syndrome causing hearing loss
