= Myth-o-Mania =

Children's book series by Kate McMullan

- Author: Kate McMullan
- Language: English
- Genre: Children's fiction
- Media type: Print (paperback)

Myth-o-Mania is a series of books for children by Kate McMullan.

== Plot ==
Each book is a parody of a different Greek myth starring Hades, the Greek god of the underworld. The books are never identical to the original myth, as they always put Hades in a positive light and claim that the original myths, made by Zeus, are fictional. The traditional hero of the myth, such as Theseus or Hercules, is usually portrayed in such a way that makes them seem a less of a hero, as Hades is forced to help the hero complete their quest. There are other differences between the original myth and the myth in the book as well, while these are often humorous or given a modern twist. For example, Elysium (a Greek version of Heaven) is portrayed as a perpetual rock concert, while in the Asphodel Meadows (a kind of middle ground afterlife), spirits are forced to write out a spelling list.

== Books in the series ==
1. Have a Hot Time, Hades! (2002) -- the story of Hades' and his siblings' childhood, in which they are eaten by Cronus and choose their domains. Basically an introduction to the Greek Gods.
2. Phone Home, Persephone! (2002) -- the myth of Hades "kidnapping" Persephone and their marriage.
3. Say Cheese, Medusa! (2002) -- the myth of Perseus and the Gorgons.
4. Nice Shot, Cupid! (2002) -- the story of Cupid and Psyche.
5. Stop that Bull, Theseus! (2003) -- the story of Theseus and the Minotaur.
6. Keep a Lid on It, Pandora! (2003) -- Pandora's Box and the story of Prometheus.
7. Get to Work, Hercules! (2003) -- the Twelve Labors of Hercules.
8. Go for the Gold, Atalanta! (2003) -- the story of the runner Atalanta.
9. Hit the Road, Helen! (2013) -- the story of the Trojan War.
10. Get Lost, Odysseus! (2014) -- the story of Odysseus' voyage home after the Trojan War.

== Reception ==
Sheila Murnaghan of the University of Pennsylvania wrote:

The new classic status of myth collections, and the impulse to attack them in order to be popular, is well illustrated by the "Myth-O-Mania" books, a series for young readers (the recommended age range is 9-12) by Kate McMullan, published by Hyperion in 2002 and 2003, beginning with the first title, Have a Hot Time, Hades!, going through Phone Home, Persephone!, Keep a Lid on it, Pandora!, Stop That Bull, Theseus!, and others, to the final volume, Go For the Gold, Atalanta!. As these titles show, the tone of the books is jokey, and they derive much of their punch from the juxtaposition of classical figures with aggressively modern idioms and situations. As the titles also show, they are highly formulaic, which may explain why the series was relatively short-lived; nonetheless, their underlying premise is quite interesting. Each book is devoted to the parodic debunking of a well-known Greek myth. The narrator is Hades, whose mission is to correct the lies of his little brother Zeus, whom he regularly characterizes as "a total myth-o-manic," which is "old Greek-speak for 'big fat liar'" (v). Zeus spreads lies mostly for self-aggrandizement. ...Strikingly, Zeus' big fat lies are propagated in the form of a book: The Big Fat Book of Greek Myths. McMullan's appeal to her readers is based on the assumption that they will have already met the myths in their traditional form at an even younger age, in a compendium like that of the D'Aulaires, and that they view that compendium as somewhat tedious and overlong (as opposed to the Myth-O-Mania books, which come in at between 150 and 165 large-print pages) - or, if they do not view it that way, they will get a charge out of being given permission to do so now. McMullan's retold myths are in some ways subversive, as we like to think that popular literature is. August classical figures are put on a par with ordinary modern people through mundane details and deflating puns. For example, Persephone uses a cell phone and checks into the Motel Styx. And the conceit that canonical myths are shaped by Zeus' self-promoting agenda conveys a sophisticated sense of the vagaries of transmission and of the role of the victorious and powerful in determining the success of a given variant.

McMullan's designs on her child readers are confused and contradictory. She wants to hook them with a parodic, subversive, anti-authoritarian stance, but she does not really want to stimulate their imaginations through stories with truly challenging elements. And in the end, she reinforces the canonical myths she makes fun of since the pleasure to be gained from her books depends on knowing the canonical versions and recognizing how they have been reworked. The Big Fat Book of Greek Myths is ultimately indispensable. McMullan's educational aims are lightly worn, but they surface in the back of the book with a glossary.

In the American Classical League's journal, Sharon Kazmierski noted:

Kate McMullan has a nifty new series out entitled "Myth-O-Mania" that will definitely appeal to the middle school setting. Be forewarned that Ms. McMullan is not Hamilton, Bulfinch, or D'Aulaire. The author herself admits that these books "are very silly," but then she also points out that when she taught sixth graders, they loved anything silly. Personally, I think the books are a hoot. The stories are told from the perspective of the long-suffering Hades, older brother of the mythomaniacal liar and cheat, Zeus, also known as the C.E.O. or "Chairgod of Everybody on Olympus." Hades has had it with all the lies told in the Big Fat Book of Mythology and has decided to set the story straight about his egotistical sibling. The first book in the series is Have a Hot Time, Hades and dishes out the dirt about how Zeus really became the Ruler of the Universe. There is a rather tongue-in-cheek chapter about the first Olympic games, in which Artemis, of course, competes in the archery competition, while Demeter has made weeding an official sport. There's plenty of quick-moving action, including the climactic "kick stone" event between the Titans and Olympians. We also find out how Hades originally acquired Cerberus. The center of each book includes a perennial middle-school favorite, two trading cards of the gods, complete with stats.

Each book includes a glossary, "King Hades' Quick and Easy Guide to the Myths," with accurate, albeit unorthodox, descriptions and definitions. Your students are bound to remember that Demeter was the goddess of agriculture when described as a "total gardening nut." (You will love the names of Hades' chariot steeds, by the way.) If you are a stickler for absolute accuracy, then this might not be the series for you or your students. However, if you have a good sense of humor and can deal with really bad puns, or if you are trying to figure out how to motivate reluctant readers to enjoy mythology, then you'll want to take a look at these. "Myth-O-Mania" might even inspire your own students to rewrite classical myths from the perspective of different Olympians.

The English Journal mentioned the series:

On a lighter note, if you teach Greek myths, you have to read at least one of the very short volumes in Kate McMullan's Myth-O-Mania series (New York: Volo). One of the most recent is Keep a Lid on It, Pandora! in which the boastful Hades (whose ego is as big as the world) sets the record straight about Pandora and the box she couldn't resist opening. Much fun.

A Handbook to the Reception of Classical Mythology provides a paragraph of coverage:

Kate McMullan's "Myth‐o‐mania" books, which appeared in 2002 and 2003, convert familiar myths into up‐to‐date versions that respond to contemporary concerns: the Minotaur is no monster, but a gentle misfit who practices vegetarianism (McMullan 2003); Persephone uses a cell phone and checks into the Motel Styx, and she was never abducted by Pluto, who only helped her escape her overprotective mother (McMullan 2002). These revisions are presented not as primary narratives, but as corrections of false stories promulgated by a self-regarding Zeus in The Big Fat Book of Greek Myths. By the early twenty-first century, the children's myth collection has become so established a form that it turns to self-parody in order to provide its child audience with a fresh experience of the pleasures of classical mythology.

An article in the University of Valencia's Journal of Literary Education drew attention to a difference in the portrayal of heroes between countries:

Being from a foreign country, I am also interested in comparing the way Greek mythology is taught to children between Greece and other countries. So far, the main difference is that heroes play a key role in Greece. In other countries, series books about Greek mythology mostly deal with gods and goddess, instead of heroes. For example, in America, Kate McMullan’s famous series book Myth-O-Mania (2002) is focused on the conflict between Hades and Zeus. Gods and monsters including Cupid, Medusa, Persephone also come into the spotlight. The stories of Theseus and Hercules are told, but they are not depicted as great heroes. In this retelling, Hades reminds (them) of their…. quest and helps them complete it.
