= Euclid City School District =

School district in Ohio

The Euclid City School District is a public school district located in Euclid, Ohio (USA). The school district consists of 6,303 students in 7 schools in grades K-12.

The district superintendent was Charlie Smaileck. Christopher Papouras, a Euclid High School alumnus, became the district's interim superintendent in August 2019; he was appointed as such the previous June 1. He was officially named superintendent in December 2019.

== Schools ==
High School (grades 9-12)

- Euclid High School

Middle Schools (grades 6-8)

- Euclid Middle School

Elementary Schools (grades K-5)

- Arbor Elementary School
- Bluestone Elementary School
- Chardon Hills Elementary School
- Shoreview Elementary School

Preschool

- Early Learning Village
