= R. W. Alley =

American illustrator

Robert Whitlock Alley (born December 30, 1955) is an American writer and illustrator of children’s books. He is best known for illustrating the children’s literature series Paddington Bear.

== Early life and education ==
Alley was born on December 30, 1955 in Lexington, Virginia to Helene Whitlock and Dr. Reuben Alley, Jr. He grew up in Annapolis, Maryland where his father was a civilian professor of electrical engineering at the United States Naval Academy.

Alley studied Art History at Haverford College and graduated in 1979.

== Career ==
He spent his early career illustrating greeting cards for multiple companies, including Hallmark Cards.

He published his first book, The Ghost in Dobbs Diner, in 1981.

He met author Michael Bond in 1997 and after an audition began illustrating the Paddington Bear book series. He illustrated Bond's final book, Paddington at Saint Paul's, in 2018, and has illustrated more than 20 books in the series as of 2024. He is the longest-serving Paddington Bear illustrator.

In 2016, he appeared on the baking competition show Cake Wars, in the Season 4 episode, "Paddington".

== Personal life ==
Alley lives in Barrington, RI with his wife, Zoe. They have two children.

== Work ==
- Paddington Bear Series, by Michael Bond (1997-Present)
- Breezy Valley Series (2023-Present)
  - Firefighters to the Rescue! (2023)
  - Hospital Heroes Save the Day! (2024)
- Four Siblings' Seasons Series (2016)
  - Clark in the Deep Sea
  - Gretchen Over the Beach
  - Mitchell on the Moon
  - Annabelle at the South Pole
- Fairy Tale Graphic Novel Series, by Zoe B. Alley
  - There's a Wolf at the Door (2008, Washington Post Kids Book of the Year)
  - There's a Princess in the Palace (2010)

=== Other notable work ===
- The Ghost in Dobbs Diner (1981)
- We’re Off to Find the Witch’s House by Mr. Krieb (2007, New York Times Bestseller)
- Pearl and Wagner series by Kate McMullan
  - Pearl and Wagner: One Funny Day (2009, Geisel Award Honor Book)
  - Pearl and Wagner: Two Good Friends (2003)
  - Pearl and Wagner: Three Secrets (2004)
  - Pearl and Wagner: Four Eyes (2009)
  - Pearl and Wagner: Five Days til Summer (2012)
- Enzo Races in the Rain, by Garth Stein, with Zoe B. Alley, based on The Art of Racing in the Rain (2014)
- Saxby Smart series, by Simon Cheshire (2007-2008)
- Because Your... series, by Andrew Clements (2005-2015)
- Elf-Help Series, by various authors, originally printed by Saint Meinrad Archabbey (1987-Present)
