= Neil C. McMullen =

American politician

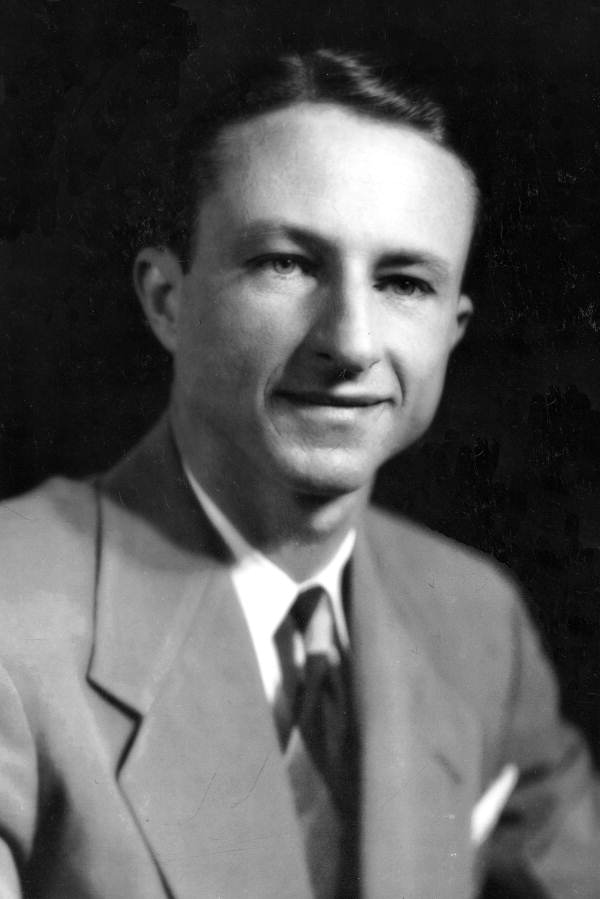
- McMullen in 1947

Member of the Florida House of Representatives from Hillsborough County
- In office 1943–1949

Personal details
- Born: August 30, 1913 Tampa, Florida, U.S.
- Died: September 17, 1992 (aged 79)
- Party: Democratic
- Education: Emory University; University of Florida

Neil C. McMullen (August 30, 1913 – September 17, 1992) was an American politician. He served as a Democratic member of the Florida House of Representatives.

== Life and career ==
McMullen was born in Tampa, Florida. He attended Emory University and the University of Florida.

McMullen served in the Florida House of Representatives from 1943 to 1949.

McMullen died on September 17, 1992, at the age of 79.
