= Mabel Madeline Southard =

Mabel Madeline Southard (July 29, 1877 - September 19, 1967) was an American Methodist minister and author.

Mabel Madeline Southard was born in Kansas on July 29, 1877 to James and Madeline Southard. She attended Southwestern College in Winfield, Kansas, and Garrett Bible Institute. At the 1924 General Conference of the Methodist Episcopal Church, she brought forward the memorial requesting full clergy rights for women within the church. While full clergy rights for women were denied, the conference did grant the right for women to serve as ordained local preachers. She was ordained as a local Methodist preacher in 1925, and preached throughout the United States, the Philippines, and India. Southard edited the journal of the American Association of Women Ministers, and wrote three books - The White Slave Traffic versus the American Home, The Attitude of Jesus toward Women, and The Christian Message on Sex. She died on September 19, 1967, in Kansas. Her papers are held at the Schlesinger Library.
