= McMillian =

McMillian is a surname. Notable people with the surname include:

- Audray McMillian (born 1962), American football player
- Geraldine McMillian, American opera singer
- Ja'Quan McMillian (born 2000), American football player
- Jerron McMillian (born 1989), American football player
- Jim McMillian (1948-2016), American basketball player
- Lennie McMillian (born 1959), American-Irish basketball player
- Mark McMillian (born 1970), American football player
- Michael McMillian (born 1978), American actor and writer
- Rodney McMillian (born 1969), American artist
- Theodore McMillian (1919–2006), American judge
- Travon McMillian (born 1996), American football player
- Walter McMillian, American pulpwood worker wrongfully convicted of murder and sentenced to death; exonerated from Death Row

== See also ==
- Hudson v. McMillian, United States Supreme Court case
