= McMillon =

McMillon is a surname. Notable people with the surname include:

- Billy McMillon (born 1971), American baseball player
- Bobby McMillon (1951–2021), American musician
- Donovan McMillon (born 2002), American football player
- Doug McMillon (born 1966), American chief executive
- John McMillon (born 1998), American baseball player
- Joi McMillon, American film editor
- Shellie McMillon (1936–1980), American basketball player
- Todd McMillon (born 1974), American football player
