= McMullin (surname) =

McMullin is a surname. Notable people with the surname include:

- Alister McMullin (1900–1984), Australian politician
- Dale McMullin (born 1955), Canadian ice hockey player
- David McMullin (1908–1995), American field hockey player
- Ernan McMullin, professor at the University of Notre Dame
- Evan McMullin, (born 1976), candidate for President of the United States in the 2016 presidential election
- Fred McMullin (1891–1952), American baseball player
- Ian McMullin (born 1964), Australian rules footballer
- Keith B. McMullin (born 1941), Latter Day Saints bishop
- Peter McMullin (born 1952), Australian politician
- R. Troy McMullin, Canadian lichenologist
