= Marie McMillin =

American aviator

Marie Margaret McMillin
- Born: Mary Margaret Meyers; July 1, 1902; Lorain, Ohio
- Died: July 30, 1954 (aged 52); Euclid, Ohio
- Resting place: Calvary Cemetery, Ohio, U.S.
- Known for: Achieving the Women's World Altitude Record

Signature
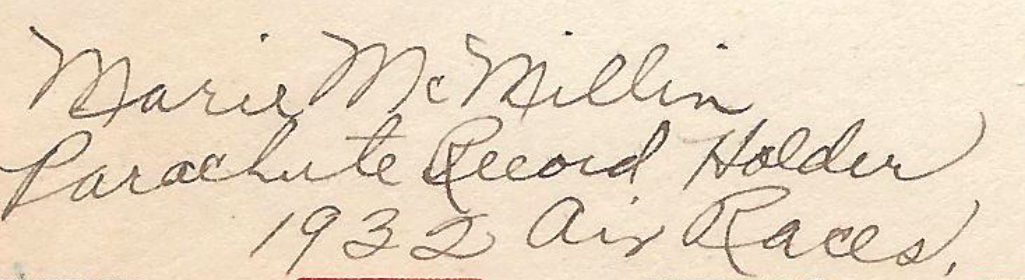

Marie Margaret McMillin (July 1, 1902 – July 30, 1954), was an American aviator who served in the Women's Army Corps from 1943 to 1945. Before entering the Women's Army Corps, McMillin achieved the world women's altitude record, jumping 20,800 feet in the Cleveland Air Races in 1932. During her military service, she worked as a parachute rigger at Fort Benning, Georgia. During her career as a professional parachutist, she is recorded to have completed 699 jumps.

== Early life ==
Marie McMillin was born Mary Margaret Meyers in July 1902. Her exact date of birth is unknown, as she was born six years before Ohio officially began keeping birth records. It is believed she was born on July 1, 1902. Her parents were Charles Meyers and Mary Ellen Meyers. She had seven siblings. In 1920, at the age of 17, she was working as a telephone operator in Lorain County, Ohio. By 1930, she was working as a receptionist in the Pierre Hotel, New York.

== Marriage and children ==
McMillin married twice. Her first marriage was to Harry McMillin, an officer in the US Army. They married on June 5, 1920. McMillin was just 18 years old. From her first marriage, she had three children; Herbert William McMillin (1922–2000), Robert Bernard McMillin (1924–1985) and Geraldine-Anne McMillin (1927–1991). Marie and Harry divorced in the mid to late 1930s; it is unknown when exactly. McMillin remarried on April 25, 1940, to Joseph Archibald Bannan.

== Aviation and parachuting career ==
Marie McMillin started her career as a professional parachutist in 1930. By 1932, she had gained her private pilots' license. McMillin made a name for herself at the National Air Races in Cleveland, Ohio in 1932. She participated in the Air Races as a parachutist. She climbed into a plane, which rose to 20,800 feet, and jumped. Her daughter Geraldine, who was only 4 at the time, was in the plane with her. The jump was successful, but recorded as the 'unofficial women's world record'. Before McMillin made her jump, the record had belonged to Billie Brown who jumped from an altitude of 18,000 feet. There are some articles, talking of her record-breaking jump, that suggest she jumped 28,000 ft. Just a few months after McMillin's record jump, she was interviewed by the Courrier-News, a local New Jersey newspaper and stated she was preparing for a 50,000 foot jump. The article stated "a special plane will be built for the flight. It will have the inventions necessary to combat the stiff atmospheric conditions in higher altitudes".

For eight years, McMillin was a professional jumper in the Curtis Wright Aerial Circus.

When asked why she enjoyed being an aviator, McMillin commented: "I like the thrills, and most important of all, I am able to give my daughter a much better living than I was accustomed to when I was young".

McMillin's last recorded jump before she entered the US Army, was on December 6, 1941. At the time, it was her 690th officially recorded jump.

== Military service ==
McMillin enlisted into the Women's Army Corps in 1943. Initially, she worked in the Quartermaster Corps, but later was transferred to the Parachute school at Ft Benning. She undertook basic training at the Third WAC Training Center at Fort Oglethorpe, GA. She was one of the first women to receive Parachute Rigger training in the U.S. Army.

In an article from 1947, McMillin admits she stowed away on a flight, to make a jump with the fellow airborne trainees at Ft Benning; "...claims the honor of being the only woman to make a jump from an Army plane. She says she did it at Fort Benning, Ga., when she stowed away on a flight".

McMillin was discharged from the Army in October 1945.

== Later years ==
After being discharged from the army, McMillin resumed her pre-war aviation career. In 1947 McMillin was injured by Walter Atkinson, who had pushed several women, including McMillin, onto the floor. He was later convicted on an assault charge. McMillin made her 699th, and final, jump on August 25, 1952. She jumped in Asbury Park, New Jersey, to mark the start of the American Legion convention.

== Death ==
Marie McMillin died on July 30, 1954, at her home in Euclid, Ohio. At the time of her death, she was living with her daughter, Geraldine Anne. Circumstances of her death are unknown, however newspaper obituary states she died "after a 3-month illness".
