= Euclid, Ohio =

- City
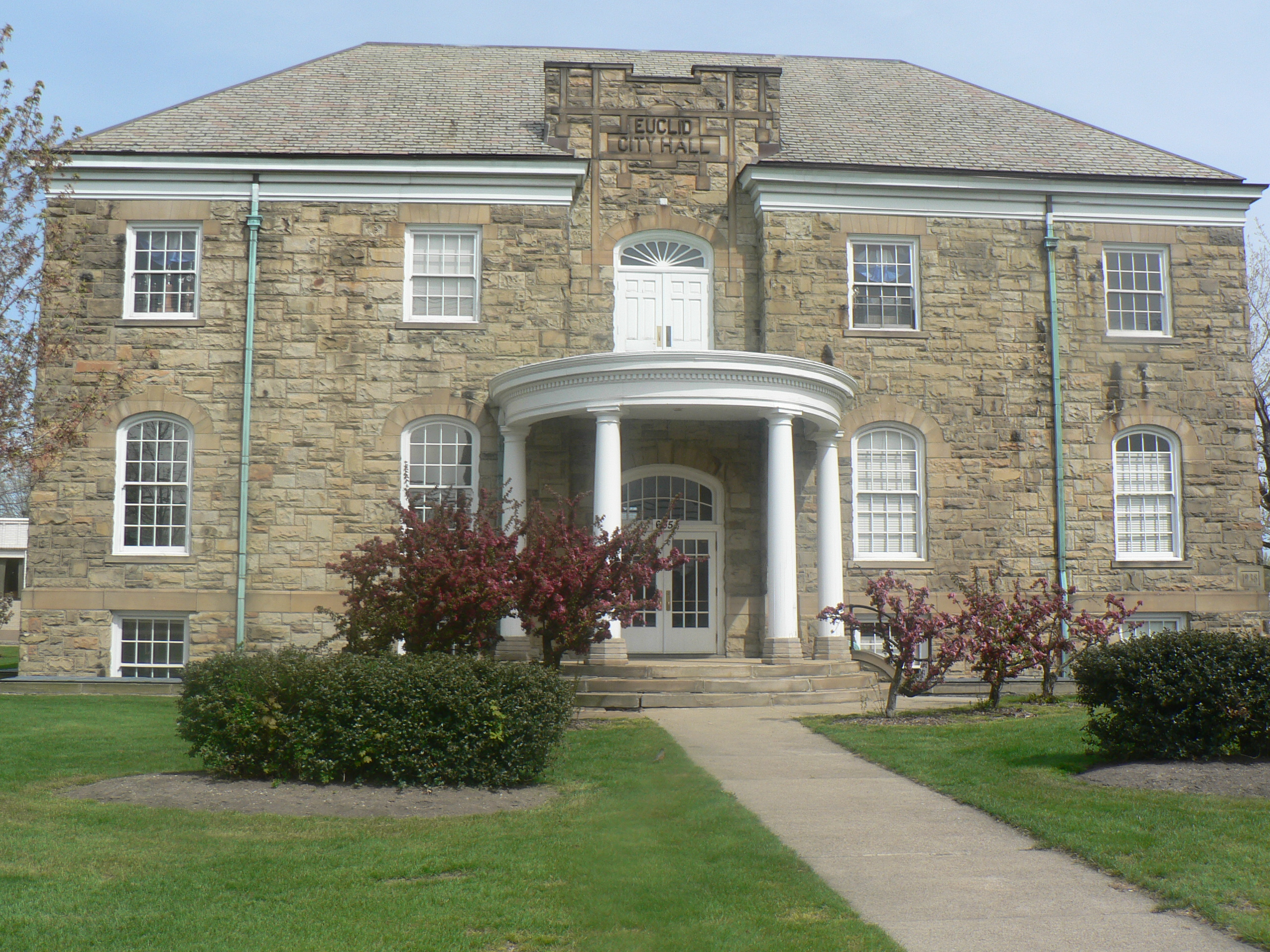
- Old City Hall of Euclid, faced with Euclid bluestone.

- Flag Logo
- Interactive map of Euclid, Ohio
- Location within Ohio Location within the United States
- Coordinates: 41°35′44″N 81°31′9″W
- Country: United States
- State: Ohio
- County: Cuyahoga
- Founded: 1796
- Incorporated: 1903 (village)
- 1930 (city)

Government
  - Type: Mayor-Council
  - Mayor: Kirsten Holzheimer Gail (D)

Area
  - Total: 11.48 sq mi (29.74 km^{2})
  - Land: 10.66 sq mi (27.60 km^{2})
  - Water: 0.83 sq mi (2.14 km^{2})
- Elevation: 617 ft (188 m)

Population (2020)
  - Total: 49,692
  - Estimate (2023): 48,212
  - Density: 4,663.7/sq mi (1,800.65/km^{2})
- Demonym: Euclidean
- Time zone: UTC-5 (EST)
  - Summer (DST): UTC-4 (EDT)
- Zip Code: 44117, 44119, 44123, 44132, 44143
- Area code: 216
- FIPS code: 39-25704
- GNIS feature ID: 1072210
- Website: www.cityofeuclid.gov

Euclid is a city in Cuyahoga County, Ohio, United States. Located on the southern shore of Lake Erie, it is an inner ring suburb of Cleveland. The population was 49,692 at the 2020 census, making it the fourth largest city in Cuyahoga County.

== History ==
The City of Euclid was originally a part of Euclid Township, first mapped in 1796 and named for Euclid of Alexandria, the ancient Greek mathematician. The first sparse settlement in the township began in 1798, with major settlement beginning in the spring of 1804. The first settlers in what is now the City of Euclid were Joseph and Chloe Burke, David and Mary Dille and William and Jamima Coleman, and their children. Following the Civil War the lake plain of Euclid Township was known for numerous excellent vineyards. Euclid Village incorporated out of the northeast portion of the township in 1903. It developed as an industrial center in the early 20th century, and became a city in 1930.

Euclid is the city where Charles F. Brush created the Arc Lamp in 1876. The cordless telephone was invented in Euclid by George Sweigert in 1969.

Euclid is the site of the 1926 U.S. Supreme Court case Village of Euclid v. Ambler Realty Co. The case opened the doors for municipalities across the United States to establish zoning ordinances.

In June 2011, Lincoln Electric installed a 2.5 Megawatt wind turbine. At 443 feet, it is the largest in Ohio and one of the largest in North America

== Geography ==
Euclid is located at 41°35′44″N 81°31′9″W (41.595563, -81.519176).

According to the United States Census Bureau, the city has a total area of 11.48 square miles (29.73 km^{2}), of which 10.63 square miles (27.53 km^{2}) is land and 0.85 square miles (2.20 km^{2}) is water. It is on the shore of Lake Erie, with a beachfront area along its north edge.

Bordering Euclid are Cleveland on the west, South Euclid and Richmond Heights on the south, Willowick, Wickliffe, and Willoughby Hills on the east, and Lake Erie on the north.

It is part of the Lake Erie Snowbelt region, prone to snow squalls blowing off Lake Erie, particularly before the lake freezes over in winter.

== Demographics ==
Historical population
Census	Pop.	Note	%±
1910	1,953		—
1920	3,363		72.2%
1930	12,751		279.2%
1940	17,866		40.1%
1950	41,396		131.7%
1960	62,998		52.2%
1970	71,552		13.6%
1980	59,999		−16.1%
1990	54,875		−8.5%
2000	52,717		−3.9%
2010	48,920		−7.2%
2020	49,692		1.6%
2025 (est.)	47,962		−3.5%
U.S. Decennial Census; 1910 1930 1960 1990; 2010 2020

=== Racial and ethnic composition ===
Euclid city, Ohio – Racial and ethnic composition Note: the US Census treats Hispanic/Latino as an ethnic category. This table excludes Latinos from the racial categories and assigns them to a separate category. Hispanics/Latinos may be of any race.
Race / Ethnicity (NH = Non-Hispanic)	Pop 2000	Pop 2010	Pop 2020	% 2000	% 2010	% 2020
White alone (NH)	34,678	21,101	14,649	65.78%	43.13%	29.48%
Black or African American alone (NH)	16,038	25,522	31,562	30.42%	52.17%	63.52%
Native American or Alaska Native alone (NH)	51	94	80	0.10%	0.19%	0.16%
Asian alone (NH)	489	354	314	0.93%	0.72%	0.63%
Native Hawaiian or Pacific Islander alone (NH)	8	3	6	0.02%	0.01%	0.01%
Other race alone (NH)	73	70	297	0.14%	0.14%	0.60%
Mixed race or Multiracial (NH)	776	1,007	1,736	1.47%	2.06%	3.49%
Hispanic or Latino (any race)	604	769	1,048	1.15%	1.57%	2.11%
Total	52,717	48,920	49,692	100.00%	100.00%	100.00%

=== 2020 census ===
As of the 2020 census, Euclid had a population of 49,692. The median age was 40.9 years. 21.8% of residents were under the age of 18, and 18.1% of residents were 65 years of age or older. For every 100 females there were 80.9 males, and for every 100 females age 18 and over there were 75.3 males age 18 and over.

100.0% of residents lived in urban areas, while 0.0% lived in rural areas.

There were 23,354 households in Euclid, of which 25.4% had children under the age of 18 living in them. Of all households, 22.6% were married-couple households, 23.5% were households with a male householder and no spouse or partner present, and 47.5% were households with a female householder and no spouse or partner present. About 42.7% of all households were made up of individuals, and 16.8% had someone living alone who was 65 years of age or older.

There were 26,107 housing units, of which 10.5% were vacant. The homeowner vacancy rate was 2.4% and the rental vacancy rate was 9.6%.

Racial composition as of the 2020 census
Race	Number	Percent
White	14,821	29.8%
Black or African American	31,798	64.0%
American Indian and Alaska Native	89	0.2%
Asian	318	0.6%
Native Hawaiian and Other Pacific Islander	9	0.0%
Some other race	562	1.1%
Two or more races	2,095	4.2%

=== 2010 census ===
As of the 2010 census, there were 48,920 people, 22,685 households, and 12,187 families living in the city. The population density was 4,602.1 inhabitants per square mile (1,776.9/km^{2}). There were 26,037 housing units at an average density of 2,449.4 per square mile (945.7/km^{2}). The racial makeup of the city was 43.8% White, 52.6% African American, 0.2% Native American, 0.7% Asian, 0.3% from other races, and 2.3% from two or more races. Hispanic or Latino of any race were 1.6% of the population.

There were 22,685 households, of which 27.8% had children under the age of 18 living with them, 28.4% were married couples living together, 20.9% had a female householder with no husband present, 4.4% had a male householder with no wife present, and 46.3% were non-families. 41.4% of all households were made up of individuals, and 14.5% had someone living alone who was 65 years of age or older. The average household size was 2.13 and the average family size was 2.91.

The median age in the city was 61 years. 22.9% of residents were under the age of 18; 7.8% were between the ages of 18 and 24; 24.3% were from 25 to 44; 28.9% were from 45 to 64; and 15.9% were 65 years of age or older. The gender makeup of the city was 44.8% male and 55.2% female.

=== 2000 census ===
As of the 2000 census, there were 52,717 people, 24,353 households, the 13,491 families living in the city. The population density was 4,923.2 inhabitants per square mile (1,900.9/km^{2}). There were 26,123 housing units at an average density of 2,439.6 per square mile (941.9/km^{2}). The racial makeup of the city was 66.36% White, 30.57% African American, 0.12% Native American, 0.94% Asian, 0.02% Pacific Islander, 0.35% from other races, and 1.64% from two or more races. Hispanic or Latino of any race were 1.15% of the population.

There were 24,353 households, out of which 24.9% had children under the age of 18 living with them, 36.3% were married couples living together, 15.2% had a female householder with no husband present, and 44.6% were non-families. 39.7% of all households were made up of individuals, and 16.1% had someone living alone who was 65 years of age or older. The average household size was 2.14 and the average family size was 2.89.

In the city, the population was spread out, with 22.3% under the age of 18, 6.8% from 18 to 24, 30.7% from 25 to 44, 21.0% from 45 to 64, and 19.2% who were 65 years of age or older. The median age was 39 years. For every 100 females, there were 84.0 males. For every 100 females age 18 and over, there were 79.1 males.

The median income for a household in the city was $35,151, and the median income for a family was $45,278. Males had a median income of $35,914 versus $28,528 for females. The per capita income for the city was $19,664. About 7.1% of families and 9.7% of the population were below the poverty line, including 11.9% of those under age 18 and 11.2% of those age 65 or over.

91.8% spoke English, 1.8% Spanish, 1.3% Croatian, 1.2% Slovene, and 0.62% Italian as their first language.

== Economy ==
Euclid is the home to both the main plant and corporate headquarters of the Lincoln Electric Company.

The Euclid Company of Ohio was a company that specialized in heavy equipment for earthmoving, namely dump trucks, loaders and wheel tractor-scrapers. It operated in the US from the 1920s to the 1950s, when it was purchased by General Motors. It was later purchased by Hitachi Construction Machinery.

== Government ==
The city uses a Mayor-Council government and there are eight councilors.

== Culture ==
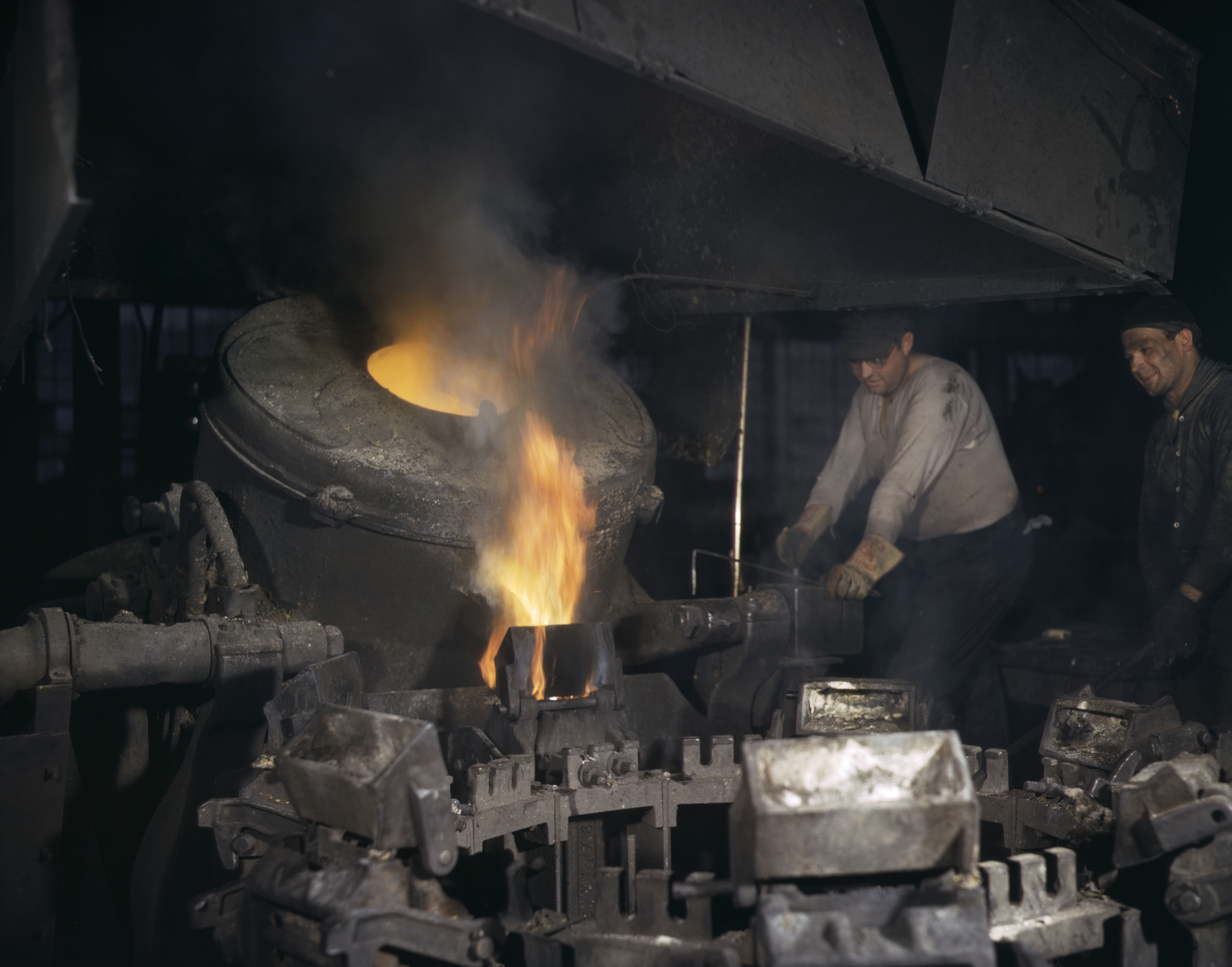
Workers in Euclid during World War II

Euclid is home to the Euclid Pony Baseball League, founded in 1951; the annual CABA High School World Series baseball tournament, and the Greater Cleveland Slo-Pitch Softball Hall of Fame

Euclid is partly home to Euclid Creek Reservation, a property of Cleveland Metroparks which shares space in South Euclid, Cleveland and Richmond Heights Euclid Beach Park was originally part of Euclid Township, until the boundaries were redrawn in the early 1900s.

Walk Two Moons by Sharon Creech was partly set in Euclid. The 1987 movie Light of Day was partially filmed in Euclid.

=== Slovenian community ===
One of the largest ethnic groups in Euclid is the Slovene population. There are a number of streets in Euclid that commemorate the Slovenian influence on Euclid, including Recher, Mavec, Drenik, Grdina, Trebec, Mozina, Kapel, and Ljubljana. Euclid is also home to the National Cleveland-Style Polka Hall of Fame tracing Cleveland-Style Polka from its Slovenian roots.

== Infrastructure ==
The city contains 143.065 miles (230.241 km) of streets; 3.06 miles (4.92 km) of Interstate 90, 1.65 miles (2.66 km) of south spur, 262.38 miles (422.26 km) of sewers, 139.65 miles (224.74 km) of water mains, three railroads; the CSX and Norfolk Southern Railway and one bus line; Greater Cleveland Regional Transit Authority. Amtrak operates its Lake Shore Limited service between Chicago, Cleveland, New York and Boston twice daily, but does not stop in Euclid.

== Education ==
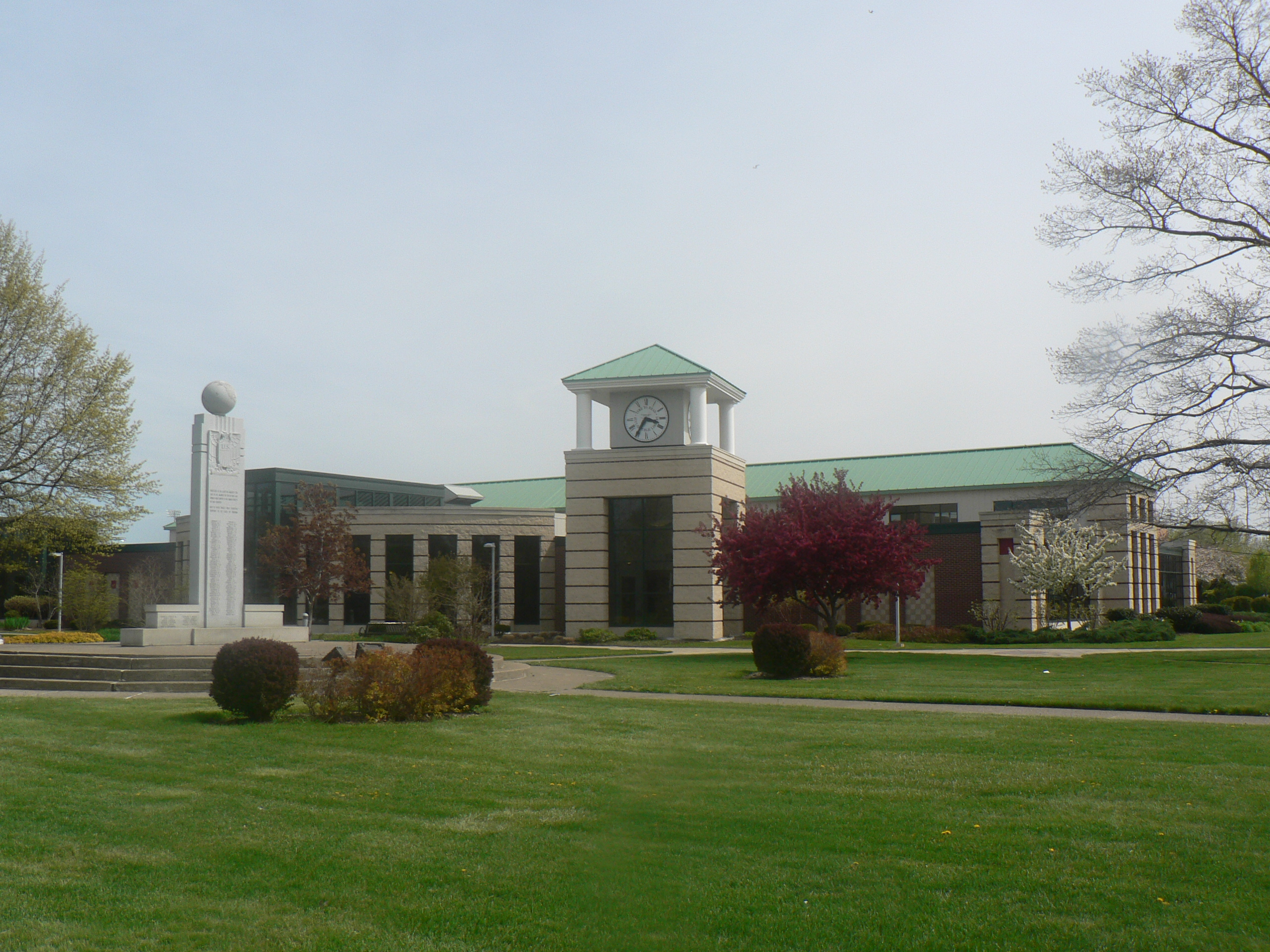
Euclid Public Library

Euclid City Schools is the local school district. Euclid High School is the local public high school.

Euclid has two Roman Catholic elementary schools: Our Lady of the Lake School and Sts. Robert and William Catholic School.

Euclid houses the Euclid Public Library, ranked third in the nation in the 50,000 population category in 2007, and has been recognized in the Top Ten of the HAPLER Public library Ratings.

== Notable people ==
- Jacob M. Appel, author, wrote "Paracosmos" while living in Euclid
- Jessica Beard, born in Euclid; sprinter, gold medalist in world championships
- Charles F. Brush, born in Euclid; engineer, inventor, entrepreneur, and philanthropist
- Laura Bell Bundy, actress and singer who has performed in a number of Broadway roles, both starring and supporting, as well as in television and film
- Philander Chase, founder of Kenyon College Bishop of Ohio and Illinois, Sixth Presiding Bishop of the National Episcopal church
- Richard Cowan, opera singer
- Sharon Creech, author
- Mary Jo Kilroy, former congresswoman, born in Euclid
- Rayshaun Kizer, football player
- Marie McMillin, World Record Parachutist and former WAC Rigger, died in Euclid in 1954
- Nathan Meeker, journalist and Bureau of Indian Affairs agent
- Stipe Miocic, mixed martial artist in the Ultimate Fighting Championship (UFC); four-time UFC heavyweight champion
- Laura Owens, artist
- Monica Potter, actress, known for films; appeared in NBC series Parenthood, for which she was nominated for a Golden Globe Award
- Hollis Resnik, actress known for Backdraft (1991), The Settlers III (1998) and Little Big Top (2006)
- Delvon Roe, actor, played Isaac in Love and Honor, sold at 2012 Cannes Film Festival; retired basketball player who played at Michigan State University
- Eric Singer, hard rock and heavy metal drummer for the rock band Kiss and formerly for singer Alice Cooper
- Robert Smith, football player and television commentator
- Amy Stoch, actress and academic, reached semifinals of spokesmodel category on television's Star Search
- Jerry Tarkanian, known as "Tark the Shark," among most successful coaches in college basketball history, coached UNLV to 1990 NCAA championship
- Brett Tomko, Major League Baseball player, pitcher with 100 career victories
- Sunita Williams, American astronaut (with Slovenian and Indian roots), formerly held the record for longest single space flight by a woman (195 days)
- Roger Zelazny, author
- Jerome Zerbe, stunt photographer

== See also ==
- Euclid City School District
- Euclid Square Mall
- Euclid Trucks
