= James McMullan =

Irish-Canadian illustrator

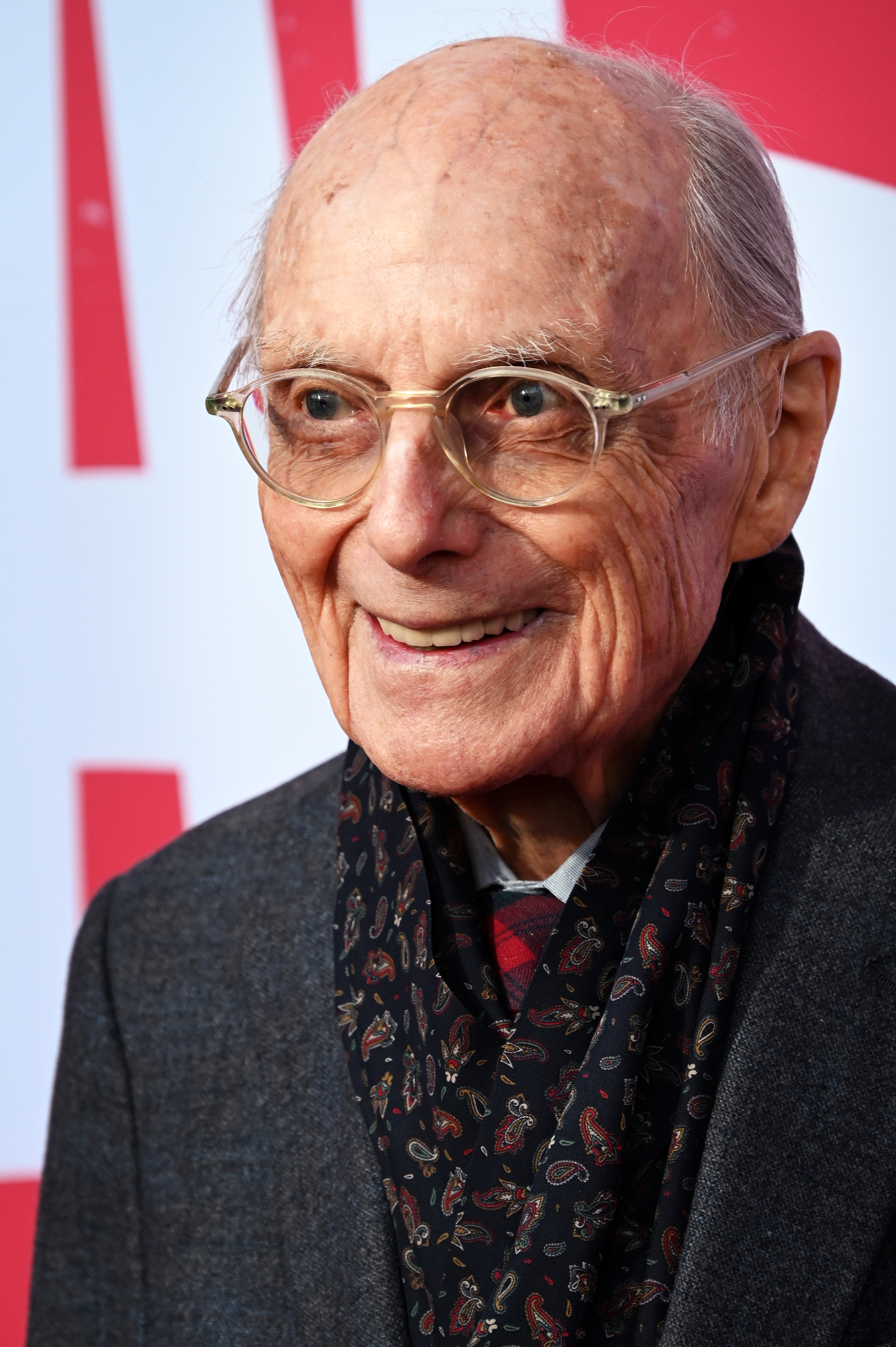
- McMullan in 2025
- Born: June 14, 1934 (age 92); Tsingtao, Republic of China
- Education: Cornish College of the Arts, Pratt Institute
- Occupation: Illustrator Designer
- Years active: 1955–present
- Spouse: Kate McMullan (m. 1979)
- Website: jamesmcmullan.com

James McMullan (born June 14, 1934) is an Irish-Canadian illustrator and designer of theatrical posters.

Born in Tsingtao in the Republic of China, where his grandparents had emigrated to from Ireland as missionaries for the Anglican Church, he and his mother fled to Canada at the onset of World War II. In 1944, he enrolled at St. Paul's Boarding School in Darjeeling, India. After his father was killed in a plane crash, he joined his mother in Shanghai, and the two relocated to Vancouver Island, where he completed his high school education.

When McMullan was 17, he and his mother emigrated to the United States, where he studied for a year at the Cornish College of the Arts in Seattle. He joined the United States Army and served at Fort Bragg in North Carolina, where he drew diagrams of where to position propaganda loudspeakers on Sherman tanks.

In 1955, McMullan moved to New York City to continue his art education at Pratt Institute. While studying there he supported himself by illustrating book jackets for authors such as Lawrence Durrell and Jorge Luis Borges. He also did magazine illustrations for Esquire and Sports Illustrated, among others. In 1966, he joined the Push Pin Studios design firm, working alongside Milton Glaser, Seymour Chwast, and Edward Sorel.

McMullan began selling illustrations to the fledgling New York Magazine in 1968; by 1974 he was a contributing editor, helping to develop its graphic personality. His most notable contribution to the publication was the artwork illustrating Nik Cohn's 1976 story about a Brooklyn discotheque. The piece served as the basis for Saturday Night Fever.

McMullan's first theatrical poster was for the 1976 production of Comedians at the Music Box Theatre, produced by Alexander H. Cohen, who began to hire him on a regular basis. When Cohen's associate, Bernard Gersten, became executive producer of Lincoln Center Theater, he invited McMullan to join the organization. As of 2022, he had created more than 90 posters for Lincoln Center productions, many of which are included in the 1998 book The Theater Posters of James McMullan. He won a Drama Desk Special Award for his consistently inspired artwork for the theater in 1991. André Bishop, the artistic director of the Lincoln Center Theater, has written than "McMullan manages to capture le moment précis of each play, and he does it well in advance of ever having seen the production." In 2017, Mark Rozzo, in a profile of the artist for Vanity Fair, noted that McMullan "is to modern-day New York what Toulouse-Lautrec was to 19th-century Paris: the poster artist who sums up the spirit of his age."

In 1981, McMullan published Revealing Illustrations, in which he candidly discusses his working method. He is the creator of the "High Focus" method of figure drawing, which he began teaching at the School of Visual Arts in 1987. In 2014 he published an illustrated autobiography called Leaving China: An Artist Paints His World War II Childhood. In 2022, he published a book of portraits called Hello World: The Body Speaks in the Drawings of Men.

McMullan and his wife Kate McMullan have collaborated on more than a dozen picture books for children.
