= Kate McMullan =

American author of children's books

- Born: Kate Hall; January 16, 1947 (age 79) St. Louis, Missouri, U.S.
- Occupation: Author
- Education: University of Tulsa (BSc, 1969); Ohio State University (MA, 1972)
- Notable works: Myth-o-Mania; Dragon Slayers' Academy
- Spouse: James McMullan (m. 1979)
- Children: Leigh Fenwick

Website
- katemcmullan.com

Kate McMullan (née Hall; born January 16, 1947) is an American author of children's books. She has published over 100 books. Notable works include the Myth-o-Mania and Dragon Slayers' Academy book series.

== Biography ==
McMullan was born on January 16, 1947, in St. Louis to Lee Aker and Kathryn Hall. She received a Bachelor of Science from the University of Tulsa in 1969.

After receiving her bachelor's degree, McMullan taught grade school in Los Angeles, after which she returned to school, receiving a Master of Arts from the Ohio State University in 1972. From 1972 to 1975, McMullan taught at a United States Air Force base in Hahn, West Germany. Upon return, she moved to New York City, where she worked as an editor at Harcourt Brace Jovanovich, Inc.

While in New York, she met Irish-Canadian illustrator James Burroughs McMullan (born 1934). The couple married on June 9, 1979. They have a daughter, Leigh Fenwick.

Starting in 1989, McMullan taught at New York University School of Continuing Education.

== Awards and honors ==
Five of McMullan's books are Junior Library Guild selections: Pearl and Wagner: Three Secrets (2004), Pearl and Wagner: Two Good Friends (2004), Pearl and Wagner: One Funny Day (2009), School! (2010), and I'm Cool! (2015).

Bank Street College of Education has included seven of McMullen's books on their lists of the best books of the year. The following books have been included on their list of the best books for children under age five: I’m Big! (2011), I'm Fast! (2013), I'm Cool! (2016), (Note: Bank Street College of Education marked I'm Cool as being of "outstanding merit".) and How Do You Go to Sleep? (2020). The following books have been included on their list of the best books for children ages five to nine: Pearl and Wagner: One Funny Day (2010) and Pearl and Wagner: Five Days till Summer (2013). In 2011, School! was included on their list of best books for children ages nine to twelve.

The Association for Library Service to Children has included I Stink! (2002) and Pearl and Wagner: One Funny Day (2010) on their list of Notable Children's Books. They included the I'm Fast! audiobook on their list of Notable Children's Recordings.

I Stink! was included on Booklist's 2002 Booklist Editors' Choice: Books for Youth list.

Awards for McMullan's writing
Year	Title	Award	Result	Ref.
2002	I Stink!	Cuffie Award for Best Book Title	Winner	
2003	I Stink!	Charlotte Zolotow Award	Commended	
2003	I Stink!	Irma Black Award	Honor	
2009	I'm Dirty	Odyssey Award	Honor	
2010	Pearl and Wagner: One Funny Day	Geisel Award	Honor	

== Publications ==
=== Picture books ===
- Good Night, Stella. Candlewick Press. 1994. ISBN 978-1-56402-065-9.
- Hey, Pipsqueak!. Illustrated by Jim McMullan. HarperCollins. 1995. ISBN 0-06-205100-8.
- If You Were My Bunny. Illustrated by David McPhail. Scholastic. 1996. ISBN 0-590-52749-5.
- Noel the First. HarperCollins. 1996. ISBN 978-0-06-205142-4.
- I Stink!. Illustrated by Jim McMullan. HarperCollins. 2002. ISBN 978-0-06-029848-7.
- Supercat. Illustrated by Pascal Lemaître. Workman Publishing. 2002. ISBN 978-0-7611-2644-7.
- I'm Mighty!. Illustrated by Jim McMullan. HarperCollins. 2003. ISBN 978-0-06-009290-0.
- Papa's Song. Sunburst. 2003. ISBN 978-0-374-45718-1.
- Rock-A-Baby Band. Illustrated by Janie Bynum; music by Peggo and Paul with the P. Tingley. 2003. ISBN 978-0-316-60858-9.
- Supercat to the Rescue. Illustrated by Pascal Lemaitre. Workman Publishing. 2003. ISBN 978-0-7611-2734-5.
- Baby Goose. Illustrated by Pascal Lemaître. Hyperion. 2003. ISBN 978-0-7868-0430-6.
- I'm Dirty!. Illustrated by Jim McMullan. Cotler. 2006. ISBN 978-0-06-009293-1.
- Bathtub Blues. Illustrated by Janie Bynum. Little, Brown & Co. 2005. ISBN 0-316-60901-3.
- I'm Bad!. Illustrated by Jim McMullan. HarperCollins. 2008. ISBN 978-0-06-122971-8.
- Ride 'Em, Cowboy!. Illustrated by Lorelay Bove. Disney Press. 2009. ISBN 978-1-4231-1056-9.
- Bulldog's Big Day. Illustrated by Pascal Lemaître. Orchard Press. 2010. ISBN 978-0-545-17155-7.
- I'm Big!. Illustrated by Jim McMullan. Balzer + Bray. 2010. ISBN 978-0-06-122974-9.
- I'm Fast!. Illustrated by Jim McMullan. Balzer + Bray. 2011. ISBN 978-0-06-192085-1.
- I'm Brave!. Illustrated by Jim McMullan. Balzer + Bray. 2014. ISBN 978-0-06-220318-2.
- I'm Cool!. Illustrated by Jim McMullan. Balzer + Bray. 2015. ISBN 978-0-06-230629-6.
- Mama's Kisses. Illustrated by Tao Nyeu. Dial Press. 2016. ISBN 978-0-525-42832-9.
- I'm Smart!. Illustrated by Jim McMullan. Balzer + Bray. 2017. ISBN 978-0-06-244923-8.
- I'm Tough!. Illustrated by Jim McMullan. Balzer + Bray. 2018. ISBN 9780062449252.
- As Warm as the Sun. Illustrated by Jim McMullan. Porter. 2019. ISBN 978-0-8234-4327-7.
- How Do You Go to Sleep?. Illustrated by Sydney Hanson. Knopf. 2019. ISBN 9780525579441.
- Happy Springtime!. Illustrated by Sujean Rim. Neal Porter. 2021. ISBN 9780823445516.
- This Is the Tree We Planted. Illustrated by Alison Friend. Knopf. 2022. ISBN 978-0-525-57947-2.

=== Early reader books ===
- Stevenson, Robert Louis (1984). Dr. Jekyll and Mr. Hyde. Adapted by Kate McMullan, Illustrated by Paul Van Munching. Random House Children's Books. ISBN 9780394863658.
- Dinosaur Hunters. Illustrated by John R. Jones. Random House Books for Young Readers. 1989. ISBN 978-0-394-81150-5.
- Leroux, Gaston (1989). The Phantom of the Opera. Adapted by Kate McMullan. Random House Children's Books. ISBN 9780394838472.
- The Noisy Giants' Tea Party. Illustrated by Jim McMullan. HarperCollins. 1992. ISBN 978-0-06-205017-5.
- Nutcracker Noel. Illustrated by Jim McMullan. HarperCollins. 1993. ISBN 0-06-205039-7.
- The Mummy's Gold. Illustrated by Jeff Spackman. Grosset & Dunlap. 1996. ISBN 9780448413457.
- School! Adventures at the Harvey N. Trouble Elementary School. Illustrated by George Booth. Feiwel and Friends. 2010. ISBN 978-0-312-37592-8.

==== Fluffy the Classroom Guinea Pig books ====
The Fluffy the Classroom Guinea Pig books are illustrated by Mavis Smith and published by Scholastic Corporation between 1997 and 2004.

- Fluffy Goes to School. 1997.
- McMullan, Kate (1998). Fluffy's Valentines Day. Scholastic. ISBN 9780590372169.
- McMullan, Kate (1998). Fluffy's Spring Vacation. Scholastic Incorporated. ISBN 9780590372176.
- McMullan, Kate (1998). Fluffy's Silly Summer. Scholastic. ISBN 9780590032698.
- Fluffy's Happy Halloween. 1998.
- McMullan, Kate (1999). Fluffy Saves Christmas. Scholastic Incorporated. ISBN 9780590523080.
- McMullan, Kate (1999). Fluffy's New Friend. Scholastic. ISBN 9780439129169.
- McMullan, Kate (2000). Fluffy Learns to Read. Scholastic Incorporated. ISBN 9780439207324.
- McMullan, Kate (2000). Fluffy Meets The Dinosaurs. Scholastic. ISBN 9780590523103.
- McMullan, Kate (2000). Fluffy's 100th Day Of School. Scholastic. ISBN 9780590523097.
- McMullan, Kate (2000). Fluffy's Thanksgiving. Scholastic. ISBN 9780590372152.
- McMullan, Kate (2001). Fluffy and the Fire Fighters. Scholastic. ISBN 9780439129176.
- McMullan, Kate (2001). Fluffy Meets The Groundhog. Scholastic. ISBN 9780439206723.
- McMullan, Kate (2001). Fluffy, the Secret Santa. Scholastic. ISBN 9780439319423.
- McMullan, Kate (2001). Fluffy's Funny Field Trip. Scholastic. ISBN 9780439206730.
- McMullan, Kate (2001). Fluffy's School Bus Adventure. Scholastic. ISBN 9780439206716.
- McMullan, Kate (2002). Fluffy Goes Apple Picking. Scholastic. ISBN 9780756915186.
- McMullan, Kate (2002). Fluffy Goes to Washington. Scholastic. ISBN 9780439319430.
- McMullan, Kate (2002). Fluffy Grows A Garden. Scholastic. ISBN 9780439206747.
- McMullan, Kate (2002). Fluffy Learns to Swim. Scholastic Incorporated. ISBN 9780439319461.
- Fluffy Meets The Tooth Fairy. 2002.
- McMullan, Kate (2002). Fluffy's Trick-Or-Treat. Scholastic. ISBN 9780439319416.
- McMullan, Kate (2003). Fluffy, the Snow Pig. Scholastic. ISBN 9780439438438.
- McMullan, Kate (2003). Fluffy's Lucky Day. Scholastic. ISBN 9780439319447.
- McMullan, Kate (2003). Fluffy's School Adventures. Scholastic, Incorporated. ISBN 9780760740958.
- McMullan, Kate (2004). Fluffy and Friends. Barnes & Nobel. ISBN 9780760758212.
- McMullan, Kate (2004). Fluffy Plants a Jelly Bean. Scholastic. ISBN 9780439319454.

==== Pearl and Wagner books ====
The Pearl and Wagner books are illustrated by R. W. Alley and published by Dial Press between 2003 and 2012.

- McMullan, Kate (2003). Two Good Friends. Dial Books for Young Readers. ISBN 978-0-8037-2573-7.
- McMullan, Kate (2004). Three Secrets. Dial Books for Young Readers. ISBN 0-8037-2574-4.
- McMullan, Kate (2009). One Funny Day. Dial Books for Young Readers. ISBN 9780803730854.
- McMullan, Kate (2010). Four Eyes. Dial Books for Young Readers. ISBN 978-0-8037-3086-1.
- McMullan, Kate (2012). Five Days Till Summer. Penguin Young Readers. ISBN 9780803735897.

=== Middle grade books ===
- The Story of Harriet Tubman: Conductor of the Underground Railroad. Random House Children's Books. 1990. ISBN 9780440404002.
- Under the Mummy's Spell. Farrar Straus Giroux. 2000. ISBN 978-0-374-38033-5.
- As Far as I Can See: Meg's Prairie Diary. Scholastic. 2002. ISBN 0-439-42517-4.
- My Travels with Captains Lewis and Clark by George Shannon. Art by Adrienne Yorinks. Cotler. 2004. ISBN 978-0-06-008099-0.
- Pinocchio. Illustrated by Pascal Lemaître. Ottaviano. 2014. ISBN 978-0-8050-9699-6.

==== Dragon Slayers' Academy series ====
The Dragon Slayers Academy books are published under the name K. H. McMullan and illustrated by Bill Basso. They were published by Grosset & Dunlap between 1997 and 2012. They have been translated into 24 languages.

1. McMullan, Kate (1997). The New Kid at School. Grosset & Dunlap. ISBN 978-0-448-41727-1.
2. McMullan, Kate (1997). Revenge of the Dragon Lady. Grosset & Dunlap. ISBN 9780448415932.
3. McMullan, Kate (1998). Class Trip to the Cave of Doom. Grosset & Dunlap. ISBN 9780448415949.
4. McMullan, Kate (1998). A Wedding for Wiglaf?. Grosset & Dunlap. ISBN 9780448415956.
5. McMullan, Kate (1999). Knight for a Day. Grosset & Dunlap. ISBN 9780448419749.
6. McMullan, Kate (1999). Sir Lancelot, Where Are You?. Grosset & Dunlap. ISBN 9780448419794.
7. McMullan, Kate (1999). Wheel of Misfortune. Grosset & Dunlap. ISBN 9780448420318.
8. McMullan, Kate (1999). Countdown to the Year 1000. Grosset & Dunlap. ISBN 9780448420332.
9. McMullan, Kate (2003). 97 Ways to Train a Dragon. Penguin. ISBN 9780448431772.
10. McMullan, Kate (2004). Help! It's Parents Day at DSA. Penguin. ISBN 9780448432205.
11. McMullan, Kate (2004). Danger! Wizard at Work!. Penguin. ISBN 9780448435299.
12. McMullan, Kate (2004). The Ghost of Sir Herbert Dungeonstone. Penguin. ISBN 9780448435305.
13. McMullan, Kate (2005). Beware! It's Friday the 13th. Penguin. ISBN 9780448435312.
14. McMullan, Kate (2005). Pig Latin--Not Just for Pigs!. Penguin. ISBN 9780448438207.
15. McMullan, Kate (2005). Double Dragon Trouble. Penguin. ISBN 9780448438214.
16. McMullan, Kate (2006). World's Oldest Living Dragon. Penguin. ISBN 9780448441122.
17. McMullan, Kate (2006). Hail! Hail! Camp Dragononka. Penguin. ISBN 9780448441245.
18. McMullan, Kate (2006). Never Trust a Troll!. Penguin. ISBN 9780448443935.
19. McMullan, Kate (2007). Little Giant--Big Trouble. Penguin. ISBN 9780448444482.
20. McMullan, Kate (2012). School's Out...Forever!. Grosset & Dunlap. ISBN 9780448445717.

==== Myth-O-Mania books ====
- Have a Hot Time, Hades!. Volo. 2002. ISBN 9780786808571.
- Nice Shot, Cupid!. Volo. 2002. ISBN 9780786816675.
- Phone Home, Persephone!. Volo. 2002. ISBN 9780786816651.
- Say Cheese, Medusa!. Capstone. 2002. ISBN 9780786816668.
- Get to Work, Hercules!. Volo. 2003. ISBN 9780786816705.
- Go for the Gold, Atalanta!. Volo. 2003. ISBN 9780786816712.
- Keep a Lid on It, Pandora!. Volo. 2003. ISBN 9780786816699.
- Stop that Bull, Theseus!. Volo. 2003. ISBN 9780786816682.
- Hit the Road, Helen!. Capstone Young Readers. 2013. ISBN 978-1-4342-6219-6.
- Get Lost, Odysseus!. Stone Arch Books. 2014. ISBN 9781434291943.

=== Young adult books ===
- The Great Ideas of Lila Fenwick. Dial Books. 1986. ISBN 978-0-8037-0316-2.
- The Great Eggspectations of Lila Fenwick. Illustrated by Diane de Groat. Farrar, Straus and Giroux. 1991. ISBN 0-374-32774-2.
