= Mullen =

Mullen is a surname of Irish origin, variation name is Cullen. According to historian C. Thomas Cairney, the O'Mullens were a chiefly family of the Uí Mháine tribe who in turn were from the Dumnonii or Laigin who were the third wave of Celts to settle in Ireland during the first century BC.

Notable people with the surname include:

- Alex Mullen (disambiguation)
- Andrew Mullen (born 1996), British Paralympian swimmer
- Ann A. Mullen (1935–1994), American politician
- April Mullen, Canadian actress and filmmaker
- Barbara Mullen (1914–1979), American actress
- Brian Mullen (born 1962), former NHL player
- Carol A. Mullen, Canadian-American mentoring scholar
- Charlie Mullen (1889–1963), Major League Baseball first baseman
- Dan Mullen (born 1972), American college football coach
- Danny Mullen (born 1995), Scottish professional footballer
- David Mullen (singer) (born 1964), former Blues Pop/CCM singer and producer
- David Robert Mullen (born 1952), American artist and photographer
- Earl Mullen (1902–1969), American politician and businessman
- Ed Mullen (1913–1988), American professional basketball player
- Frank Mullen (born 1970), American death metal vocalist
- Fraser Mullen (born 1993), professional footballer
- Geoff Mullen (1947–2014), Australian draft resister
- George Mullen, astronomer
- Graham Calder Mullen (born 1940), Senior United States District Judge
- Harryette Mullen (born 1953), American poet, author and professor of English
- Jack Mullen (1922–2004), American politician from Nebraska
- James T. Mullen (1843–1891), first Supreme Knight of the Knights of Columbus
- Jarrod Mullen (born 1987), Australian former rugby league footballer
- Jeff Mullen (born c. 1968), college assistant football coach
- Jerry Mullen (1933–1979), college basketball player
- Jesse James Mullen (born c. 1984), American businessman and politician
- Jim Mullen (born 1945), Scottish jazz guitarist
- Jimmy Mullen (footballer born 1923) (1923–1987), football player
- Jimmy Mullen (footballer born 1952) (born 1952), former football player and manager
- Joe Mullen (born 1957), former National Hockey League player
- John Mullan (disambiguation)
- Karl Mullen (1926–2009), Irish rugby union player
- Kathryn Mullen (born 1940), American puppeteer, actress, and voice actress
- Keith Mullen (born 1961), English rock musician
- Larry Mullen, Jr., (born 1961), drummer for U2
- Laura Mullen (born 1958), American poet
- Luke Mullen (born 2001), American actor, filmmaker, and environmentalist
- M. David Mullen (born 1962), Japanese-born American cinematographer
- Marie Mullen (born 1953), Irish actress
- Mark Mullen (born 1961), NBC news chief and reporter
- Matthew Mullen (born 1989), Australian footballer
- Michael Mullen (disambiguation)
- Moon Mullen (1917–2013), American baseball player
- Nick Mullen (born 1988), American comedian
- Nicole C. Mullen (born 1967), American singer, songwriter, and choreographer
- Patrick Mullen (ice hockey) (born 1986), American ice hockey player
- Patrick Mullen (Medal of Honor) (1844–1897), member of the United States Navy
- Paul Mullen (musician) (born 1982), English multi-instrumentalist and singer-songwriter
- Paul Mullen (rugby union) (born 1991), Irish-born rugby union player
- Peg Mullen (1917–2009), American anti-war activist
- Peter Mullen (born 1942), British Church of England priest and rector
- Rodney Mullen (born 1966), professional skateboarder
- Rónán Mullen (born 1970), Irish politician
- Ruth González Mullen (1939–2009), Cuban artist
- Ryan Mullen (born 1994), Irish professional racing cyclist
- Samuel Mullen (1828–1890), Irish bookseller in Australia
- Sheila Mullen (artist) (born 1942), Scottish painter
- Sheila Mullen (model) (born 1957), American model
- Thomas Mullen (1897–1966), Irish Fianna Fáil politician and school teacher
- Tiawan Mullen (born 2000), American football player
- Tobias Mullen (1818–1900), Roman Catholic Bishop of Erie
- Tom Mullen (American football) (born 1951), American football player
- Tom Mullen (Australian footballer) (1868–1942), Australian rules footballer
- Trayvon Mullen (born 1997), American football player
- William F. Mullen III (1964–2024), United States Marine Corps officer

== See also ==
- Irish clans
- Mac Maoláin, a surname
- Maelan mac Cathmogha, a king
- Moylan, a surname
- Mullenising, an Australian scrub-clearing device
- Mullens (disambiguation)
- Mullin, a surname
- Mullins (surname)
