= Mullan =

Mullan is an Irish surname. It may refer to:

== People ==
- Brian Mullan (born 1978), American soccer player
- C. H. Mullan (1912–1996), Northern Ireland judge and unionist politician
- Charles W. Mullan (1845–1919), American judge and politician
- Ciarán Mullan (born 1984), Irish Gaelic footballer
- Don Mullan (born 1956), Irish humanitarian worker, writer and film producer
- Gerry Mullan (disambiguation), several people
- Harry Mullan (1946–1999), Irish boxing writer
- John Mullan (disambiguation), several people
- Kieran Mullan (born 1984), British MP
- Martin Mullan, Irishman convicted of IRA gun-running
- Matt Mullan (born 1987), English rugby player
- Peter Mullan (born 1959), Scottish actor
- Robert Mullan (1947–2024), British film director

== Places ==
=== United States ===
- Mullan, Idaho
- Mullan Pass, Montana, a mountain pass in the Rockies
- Mullan Road, Montana and Washington

=== Other places ===
- Mullan, County Fermanagh, a townland in County Fermanagh, Northern Ireland
- Mullan, County Londonderry, a townland in County Londonderry, Northern Ireland
- Mullan, County Cavan, a townland of County Cavan, Republic of Ireland

=== Schools ===
- Mullan Junior/Senior High School, Mullan, Idaho

== See also ==
- Mullane, a surname
- Mullen, a surname
- Mullin, a surname
