= UCL Faculty of Engineering Sciences =

Coordinates: 51.52280°N 0.13213°W

- Dean: Professor Andy Nisbet
- Administrative staff: 391 (Academic and research staff (as at October 2009))
- Students: 1,555 (Undergraduate (2025/26)); 1,181 (Graduate (2008/09))
- Location: London, United Kingdom
- Website: UCL Faculty of Engineering Sciences

The UCL Faculty of Engineering Sciences is one of the 11 constituent faculties of University College London (UCL). The Faculty, the UCL Faculty of Mathematical and Physical Sciences and the UCL Faculty of the Built Environment (The Bartlett) together form the UCL School of the Built Environment, Engineering and Mathematical and Physical Sciences.

For the period January 2000 to August 2010 UCL was ranked 16th in the world (and second in Europe) for citations per paper in engineering, with an average of 8.83 citations per paper.

== History ==
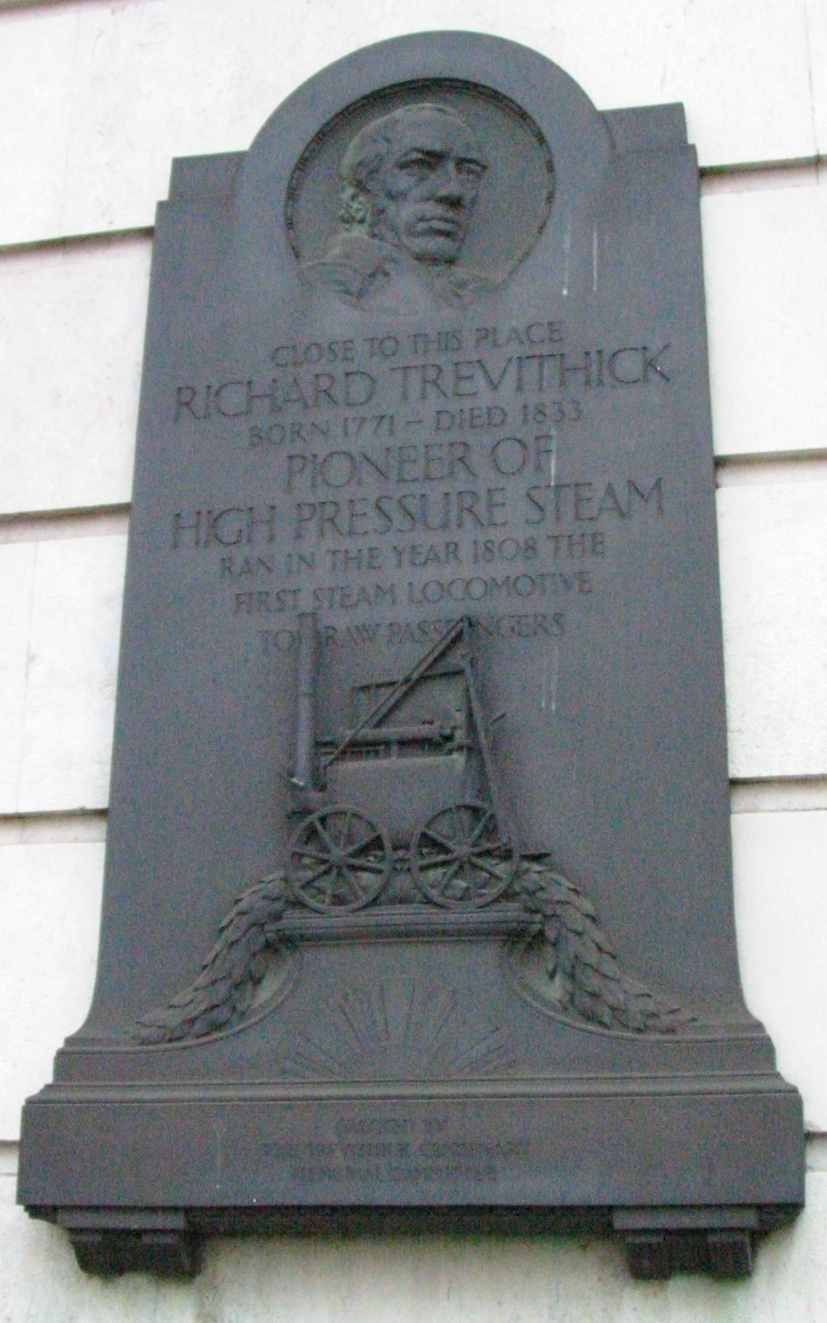
A plaque on the Civil Engineering Laboratory honoring railroad pioneer Richard Trevithick

=== 19th century ===
Engineering at UCL traces its beginnings to when John Millington was announced as the professor of engineering. However, he resigned prior to the college's opening in 1828 and never lectured, thus it was not until 1841 – after the opening of engineering courses at Durham University and King's College London – that UCL appointed its first engineering professor. The laboratory in Gower Street was "arguably the first in the world to be dedicated to the teaching of engineering". It today serves as the Civil Engineering Laboratory and bears a plaque which commemorates the pioneering railway engineer, Richard Trevithick who ran the first passenger steam locomotive nearby in 1808.

The world's first instruction in the field of chemical engineering, a course entitled "Chemical Technology", was taught at UCL in 1882. The department soon saw its first Nobel Prize winner when professor William Ramsay, who arrived at UCL in 1887, won the prize in chemistry for his discovery of noble gases. The first course in chemical engineering was established by the first Ramsay memorial professor, E. C. Williams.

By the end of the 19th century, departments of civil, mechanical, and electrical engineering had been established. The civil engineering department specialised in public health which was a significant issue in Victorian London at this time. The first professor of electrical engineering was John Ambrose Fleming, who took the Chair of Electrical Technology at UCL in 1884.

=== 20th century ===
While at UCL, Fleming invented the vacuum tube in 1904. A former graduate of UCL, he was a contemporary of Alexander Graham Bell who also studied there. The institution thus made a great contribution to the establishment of electronics and telecommunications in the 20th century. In 1923, UCL opened the Ramsay department of chemical engineering, appointing the first name chair in the UK in the subject, E. C. Williams, after the Ramsay Memorial Trust gave half of its donations to set up the department. In 1928, Williams replacement as the Ramsay professor W. E. Gibbs greatly expanded the chemical engineering department including the building of the Ramsay Laboratory. In 1959, the Ramsay professor of chemical engineering, M. B. Donald, with the head of Biochemistry, Ernest Baldwin launched the first diploma in Biochemical engineering.

In 1973 UCL Computer Science became, along with the National Defence Research Establishment of Norway, the first international link to the Arpanet, the forerunner of the internet. Professor John Mullin, World expert in crystallisation was appointed to the Ramsay Memorial Chair of the department of chemical engineering from 1985 to 1990. The Advanced Centre for Biochemical Engineering was opened in 1991. The first Department of Biochemical Engineering was opened at UCL in 1998, with Professor Peter Dunnill as its chairman. In November 2000 agreement was made between UCL and BT Group for the opening of UCL@Adastral Park at the Adastral Park technology park in Martlesham, Suffolk.

=== 21st century ===
The London Centre for Nanotechnology was established as a joint venture between UCL and Imperial College London in 2003 following the award of a £13.65m higher education grant under the Science Research Infrastructure Fund. The Jill Dando Institute, the first university department in the world devoted specifically to reducing crime, was founded in 2001.

The Department of Management Science and Innovation was established in June 2007 under the leadership of Steven Currall. The UCL School of Energy and Resources opened in Adelaide, Australia in 2009 with Tony Owen as its inaugural director. In early 2009, the Photonics Systems Development Centre was established in a collaboration with University of Cambridge with funding from the Engineering and Physical Science Research Council to equip and train world leaders of photonics research and engineering. In March 2010 UCL, together with the University of Manchester, was the first recipient of funding from the Engineering and Physical Science Research Council's Collaboration Fund.

In November 2011, UCL and the BBC formed a strategic partnership, focused on a four-year research and development programme in the areas of access services, advanced communications, content production, the internet and user experience design. A dedicated site is planned to be established at Euston Square which will house around 40 BBC staff and 40 UCL researchers.

In January 2013, UCL announced the creation of a department of science, technology and engineering policy from September 2013, to form part of the Faculty of Engineering Sciences.

== Departments ==
The Faculty currently comprises the following departments:

- UCL Department of Biochemical Engineering ( http://www.ucl.ac.uk/biochemeng )
- UCL Department of Chemical Engineering (joined 1947 from the Faculty of Sciences)
- UCL Department of Civil, Environmental and Geomatic Engineering
- UCL Department of Computer Science
- UCL Department of Electronic and Electrical Engineering
- UCL Department of Mechanical Engineering
- UCL Department of Medical Physics and Bioengineering
- UCL Department of Science, Technology, Engineering and Public Policy (STEaPP)
- UCL Department of Security and Crime Science
- UCL School of Management

== Research ==
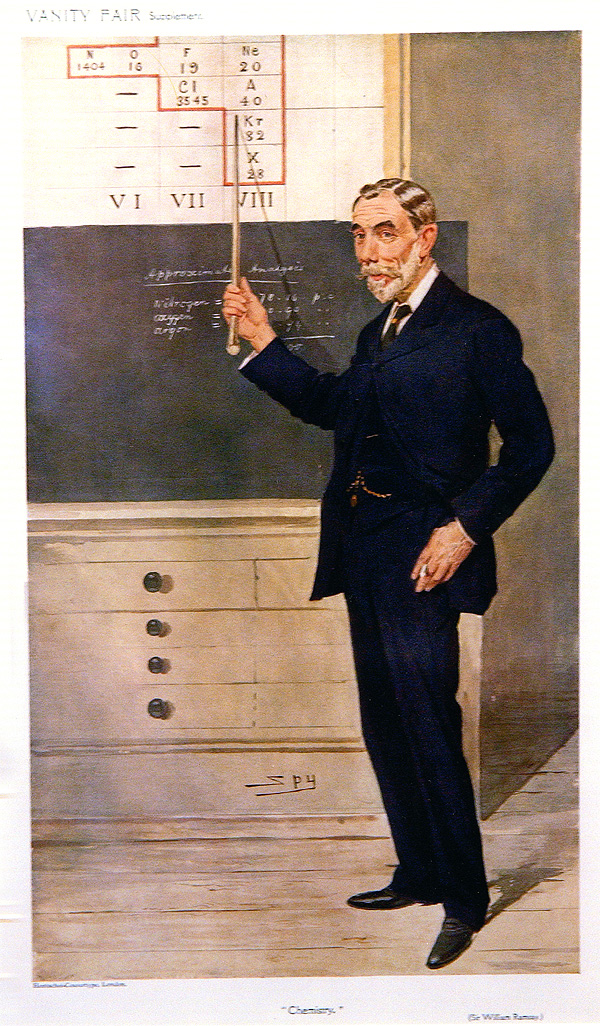
Vanity Fair caricature of William Ramsay, UCL professor who won the Nobel Prize in Chemistry for his discovery of noble gases and placement of elements in the periodic table

UCL has secured research funding under the Engineering and Physical Sciences Research Council's (EPSRC) centres for doctoral training (CDTs). The aim of these centres is to "provide a supportive and exciting environment for students to carry out a challenging PhD-level research project together with taught coursework". UCL has won funding for 9 of these centres, the next highest allocation was 4 centres awarded to the University of Bath. The centres awarded to UCL are worth £40 million, which will fund 390 PhD places.

== Rankings ==
In the 2012 Academic Ranking of World Universities subject tables UCL is ranked joint 101st-150th in the world (and joint 21st in Europe) for Engineering, Technology and Computer Sciences.

In the 2012 QS World University Rankings subject tables UCL is ranked 44th in the world (and 12th in Europe) for Engineering & Technology.

In the 2012-13 Times Higher Education World University Rankings subject tables UCL is ranked 35th in the world (and 9th in Europe) for Engineering and Technology.

For the period January 2000 to August 2010 UCL was ranked 16th in the world (and 2nd in Europe) for citations per paper in engineering, with an average of 8.83 citations per paper.

== Notable people ==
Professor Geoffrey Hinton founded the Gatsby Charitable Foundation Computational Neuroscience Unit at UCL, and was awarded the Nobel Prize in Physics in 2024 for "for foundational discoveries and inventions that enable machine learning with artificial neural networks."

Demis Hassabis, founder of Google DeepMind and recipient of the 2024 Nobel Prize in Chemistry.

Professor Charles Kao, affiliated with the UCL Faculty of Engineering Sciences, was awarded the Nobel Prize for Physics in 2009 for breakthrough discoveries in fibre optics.

For more, see List of people associated with University College London.

== See also ==
- London Business School
