= Mullins (surname) =

The surname Mullins is of Irish origin, and is akin to Mullen and McMillan.

== Geographical distribution ==
At the time of the United Kingdom Census of 1901 (the data for Ireland) and the United Kingdom Census of 1881 (the data for the rest of the United Kingdom), the frequency of the surname Mullins was highest in the following counties:

1. County Clare (1:508)
2. County Limerick (1:697)
3. County Galway (1:950)
4. County Cork (1:1,042)
5. County Waterford (1:1,133)
6. County Kilkenny (1:1,217)
7. Wiltshire (1:1,390)
8. Dorset (1:1,442)
9. County Tipperary (1:1,525)
10. King's County (1:1,547)

As of 2014, the frequency of the surname was highest in the following countries and territories:

1. Republic of Ireland (1:1,502)
2. United States (1:4,189)
3. Wales (1:4,821)
4. Australia (1:5,475)
5. Jersey (1:5,824)
6. Barbados (1:7,308)
7. England (1:8,431)
8. New Zealand (1:9,414)
9. Scotland (1:12,619)
10. Canada (1:14,092)

As of 2014, 76.7% of all known bearers of the surname Mullins were residents of the United States. The frequency of the surname was higher than national average in the following U.S. states:

1. West Virginia (1:496)
2. Kentucky (1:577)
3. Virginia (1:1,104)
4. Tennessee (1:1,240)
5. Ohio (1:1,973)
6. Alabama (1:2,305)
7. Mississippi (1:2,361)
8. Indiana (1:2,503)
9. Arkansas (1:2,538)
10. Oklahoma (1:2,618)
11. Michigan (1:4,066)
12. Missouri (1:4,077)
13. Delaware (1:4,122)

The frequency of the surname was highest in the following U.S. counties (over 20 times the national average):

1. Dickenson County, Va. (1:14)
2. Wise County, Va. (1:28)
3. Knott County, Ky. (1:40)
4. Letcher County, Ky. (1:46)
5. McDowell County, W.Va. (1:52)
6. Buchanan County, Va. (1:71)
7. Hancock County, Tenn. (1:75)
8. Breathitt County, Ky. (1:76)
9. Pike County, Ky. (1:76)
10. Menifee County, Ky. (1:90)
11. Clay County, W.Va. (1:97)
12. Pickett County, Tenn. (1:104)
13. Logan County, W.Va. (1:106)
14. Rockcastle County, Ky. (1:111)
15. Lincoln County, W.Va. (1:112)
16. Floyd County, Ky. (1:115)
17. Owsley County, Ky. (1:116)
18. Perry County, Ky. (1:118)
19. Franklin County, Miss. (1:118)
20. Lee County, Va. (1:119)
21. Russell County, Va. (1:127)
22. Washington County, Va. (1:148)
23. Magoffin County, Ky. (1:162)
24. Scott County, Va. (1:173)
25. Wyoming County, W.Va. (1:174)
26. Tazewell County, Va. (1:175)
27. Boone County, W.Va. (1:186)
28. Mingo County, W.Va. (1:192)
29. Nicholas County, W.Va. (1:195)
30. Powell County, Ky. (1:205)

With the single exception of Franklin County, Mississippi, these are all Appalachian counties.

== People with the surname Mullins ==
- Aimee Mullins (born 1976), American athlete and performer
- Andria Mullins (born 1980), American beauty queen and performer
- Bill Mullins, Australian rugby player
- Bitsy Mullins (1926–2003), American trumpeter
- Braylon Mullins (born 2006), American basketball player
- Brett Mullins (born 1972), Australian rugby player
- Brian Mullins (1954–2022), Irish Gaelic football player
- Brian Mullins (hurler) (born 1978), Irish hurler
- Cedric Mullins (born 1994), American baseball player
- Charles Mullins (VC recipient) (1869–1916), a South African Victoria Cross recipient
- Charlie Mullins (born 1952), British businessman, founder of Pimlico Plumbers
- Chucky Mullins (1969–1991), American football player
- Clarence H. Mullins (1895–1957), American federal judge
- Craig Mullins (born 1964), American conceptual artist
- D.R. Mullins (born 1958), American artist
- Daniel Mullins (1929-2019), British Roman Catholic bishop
- Dan Mullins (born 1976), South African sports photographer
- Dan Mullins (born 1978), English drummer
- David Mullins (disambiguation)
- Edgar Young Mullins (1860–1928), American Baptist minister
- Edwin Mullins (born 1933), British art critic and television presenter
- Edwin Roscoe Mullins (1848-1907), English sculptor
- Eustace Mullins (1923–2010), American political writer
- Fran Mullins, American baseball player
- Frederick Mullins (d. 1854), Irish politician
- Freddy Mullins (born1979), American Musician and Actor
- George Mullins (painter) (1763–1765), Irish painter
- Gerry Mullins (born 1949), American football player
- Gustav Mullins (photographer) (1854–1921), royal photographer
- Hayden Mullins (born 1979), English soccer player
- Henry Mullins (1861–1952), Canadian businessman and politician
- James Mullins (American politician) (1807–1873), an American politician
- James P. Mullins (born 1928), American general
- James Patrick Mullins (1874–1965), Canadian politician, member of Parliament
- Jeff Mullins (basketball) (born 1942), American basketball player
- Jeff Mullins (politician), American politician
- Jimmy "Mercy Baby" Mullins (1930–1977), American blues musician
- John Mullins (disambiguation)
- Larry Mullins (1908–1968), American football coach
- Larry Mullins (born 1966), American musician
- Leonard Mullins (1918–1997), English rubber scientist, the Mullins effect
- Lisa Mullins, American radio news anchor
- Mark Mullins (economist) (born 1961), Canadian economist
- Matt Mullins (born 1980), American martial artist
- Mavis Mullins, New Zealand businesswoman
- Megan Mullins (born 1987), American musician
- Melinda Mullins (born 1958), American actress
- Mike Mullins (rugby union) (born 1970), Irish rugby player
- Nathan Mullins (born 1989/90), Irish Gaelic football player and son of Brian
- Nick Mullins, English rugby player
- Pat Mullins (1938–2017), American politician
- Priscilla Alden (c. 1602 – c. 1680), née Mullins, American Pilgrim
- Rich Mullins (1955–1997), American musician
- Shawn Mullins (born 1968), American musician
- Skipper Mullins (c. 1945–2020), American martial artist
- Sue Mullins, American politician
- Thomas Mullins (Irish politician) (1904–1978), Irish politician
- Thomas Mullins (British Army officer) (d. 1823), English soldier
- William Mullins, several people

== See also ==
- Mullen (disambiguation)
- Mullens (disambiguation)
- Mullins (disambiguation)
- Mullin (surname)
