= Moylan =

- Language: Irish Gaelic

Origin
- Meaning: (son of the) bald
- Region of origin: Ireland

Other names
- Variant forms: Millane, Millan, Miland, Moylin, Mullen

Moylan is a surname of Irish origin, anglicisation of the Gaelic Ó Maoileáin, meaning ‘son of the bald (maol)’.

People bearing this name include:

- Daniel Moylan, Baron Moylan (born 1956), English Conservative politician
- Douglas Moylan (born 1966), Guamanian official
- Edward Moylan (1923–2015), American tennis player
- Harold Moylan (1903–1978), American politician from Nebraska
- James Moylan (born 1962), Delegate from Guam to the U.S. House of Representatives
- Judi Moylan (born 1944), Australian politician
- Kaleo Moylan (born 1966), Guamanian official
- Kurt Moylan (born 1939), Guamanian official
- Margaret Moylan (1907/08–1993), American politician from Nebraska
- Mary Ellen Moylan (1925–2020), American ballet dancer
- Matt Moylan (born 1991), Australian rugby player
- Myles Moylan (1838–1909), United States Army officer
- Pat Moylan (politician) (born 1946), Irish politician
- Pat Moylan (Cork hurler) (born 1949), Irish hurler
- Peter Moylan (born 1978), Australian baseball player
- Seán Moylan (1889–1957), Irish politician
- Scotty Moylan (1916–2010), Guamanian businessman
- Stephen Moylan (1737–1811), American general
- Marice Moylan Wolfe (1935–2022), American archivist

== See also ==
- Moylan, a township in Minnesota
- Moylan, an unincorporated community in Nether Providence Township, Pennsylvania
  - Moylan-Rose Valley (SEPTA station), a Pennsylvania train station
