= Newitt =

Newitt is a surname. Notable people with the name include:

- Craig Newitt (born 1984–1985), Australian jockey
- Dudley Maurice Newitt (1894–1980), British chemical engineer
- Samuel Newitt Wood (1825–1891), American attorney, newspaper publisher/editor and politician
