= Provisional Irish Republican Army arms importation =

Republican weapons smuggling into Northern Ireland during The Troubles

The Provisional Irish Republican Army began importing firearms and explosives in the early 1970s, with which it conducted an armed campaign against the British state in Northern Ireland.

== North American arms ==
=== United States ===
To continue and escalate its armed campaign, the IRA needed to be better equipped, which meant securing modern small arms. In previous campaigns, weapons had been secured before hostilities commenced via raids on British and Irish Army bases. In 1969–1971, this was no longer feasible. By 1972, the IRA had large quantities of modern small arms, including Armalite rifles, manufactured and purchased in the United States. The AR-18 rifle in particular was found to be well suited for urban guerilla warfare as its small size and folding stock made it easy to conceal. Moreover, it was capable of rapid fire and its high velocity round provided better stopping power. Some AR-18s smuggled to Northern Ireland were intercepted before the IRA could get them.

The primary IRA's gunrunner in the United States was George Harrison, an IRA veteran who had lived in New York since 1938. Harrison set up a gunrunning network in America in the 1950s, when he supplied arms for the 1956–1962 Border campaign. He bought guns for the IRA from an Italian American arms dealer, George de Meo, who had connections in organised crime. Joe Cahill acted as the contact between NORAID and Harrison, and almost all of the smuggled guns went through the network run by the latter. In 1971, the RUC seized 700 modern weapons from the IRA, along with two tonnes of high explosive and 157,000 rounds of ammunition, most of which were manufactured in the United States.

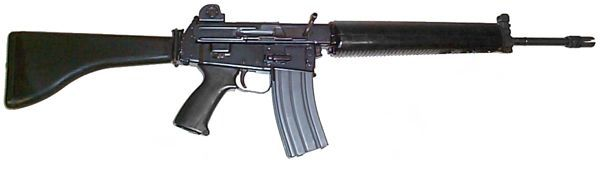
The Armalite AR-18 – obtained by the IRA from the United States in the early 1970s and an emotive symbol of its armed campaign

Harrison spent an estimated US$1 million in the 1970s purchasing over 2,500 guns for the IRA. According to Brendan Hughes, a key figure in the Belfast Brigade, the IRA smuggled small arms from the United States by sea on Queen Elizabeth 2 from New York via Southampton, through Irish members of her crew, until the network was shut down by the Federal Bureau of Investigation (FBI) in the early 1980s. These Queen Elizabeth 2 shipments included Armalite rifles, and were driven from Southampton to Belfast in small consignments.

In the late 1970s, another IRA member, Gabriel Megahey, was sent to the United States to acquire arms and was able to procure more Armalite AR-15 rifles, a number of Heckler & Koch rifles and other weapons. The purchase of these weapons was funded by Irish Americans sympathetic to Irish republicanism. A batch of M60 machine guns stolen from a U.S. National Guard armoury was imported in 1977.

Since the Troubles in Northern Ireland began in 1969, the United States Department of Justice had been cracking down on the IRA arms trafficking network in America. By 1975, the Justice Department had started to significantly weaken the Harrison network by prosecuting dozens of IRA arms trafficking cases, and as early as 1973, the IRA already found more lucrative sources of funding and weapons from foreign states, including Libyan leader Muammar Gaddafi. The prosecutions of IRA gunrunners in America were so great that according to Belfast author Jack Holland, "Harrison was not aware of any major shipments of arms that had successfully reached the IRA from the U.S. since the late 1970s; that is, before his network's destruction [in 1981]". U.S. House Speaker Tip O'Neill told Northern Ireland Secretary of State Roy Mason in mid-October 1977 that the flow of guns and money had been greatly reduced. The United States Senate Subcommittee on Juvenile Delinquency in 1976 noted the role of the Bureau of Alcohol, Tobacco and Firearms (ATF) in prosecuting IRA gunrunners:

Since September 1971, ATF has been involved in investigating Irish Republican Army (IRA) gunrunning activities in the United States. Numerous successful prosecutions of IRA "gunrunners" violating the Gun Control Act have resulted. Most notable and significant to date was the recent conviction in Baltimore, Maryland, of five IRA "gunrunners" charged with 23 violation counts of the 1968 Gun Control Act including using fictitious names, counterfeiting federal firearms licenses and illegally transporting firearms and explosive devices across state lines. Seized from the defendants were 70 of the 158 illegally purchased Colt AR-15, .223 caliber, semi-automatic rifles destined for the IRA in Northern Ireland.

On March 1, 1981, Claire Sterling wrote for The New York Times Magazine:

The IRA has come a long way since its early days of dependence upon the United States. Fund raising is mostly done at home nowadays, by means of protection rackets, brothels, massage parlors and bank stickups. And the incoming hardware is largely Soviet-made. It took only a few years to make the transformation with the help of the international terror network.

In 1980, De Meo was arrested and convicted of smuggling arms to the IRA. He was sentenced to ten years in prison. However, in a secret meeting at a hotel on Manhattan's East Side in August, FBI agents agreed to a deal with De Meo's lawyer that his sentence would be reduced to five years if he surrendered the IRA's primary gunrunner. At that time, the FBI had no idea who was the prime leader of the IRA arms support network in America. In 1981, Meo notified the FBI Joint Terrorism Task Force about Harrison's attempt to smuggle a large cache of arms into Ireland from his home in New York. Subsequently, in June, Harrison, Michael Flannery and three other Irish gunrunners were arrested by the FBI as part of a sting operation, but acquitted at their trial in 1982. The men were charged with attempting to smuggle a consignment of arms to Ireland which included a flamethrower and a 20mm anti-tank rifle. Their acquittal was widely attributed to the unconventional efforts of Harrison's personal attorney, Frank Durkan; the men did not deny their activities, but claimed that they believed the operation had been sanctioned by the Central Intelligence Agency.

Despite the men's acquittal, the arrest of Harrison halted nearly all of the guns being smuggled out of the country. Holland wrote that "there can be no doubt that with the arrest of Harrison, his gunrunning career ended and the IRA's most vital source of weapons was blocked", which was already in decline in the late 1970s; by 1980, the IRA was already importing a large number of weapons from mainland Europe and the Middle East. Irish journalist Ed Moloney in his book A Secret History of the IRA noted that:

After the destruction of the Harrison network, arms supplies to the IRA from the United States were infrequent and erratic. "There was very little stuff coming in," recalled one veteran. All too often weapons, sometime purchased over the counter in gun shops, would make their way to Ireland in twos and threes, only to be intercepted or captured by the authorities, who would then be able to trace them back and arrest and charge the sympathizers responsible. The IRA was never again able to construct a network in the United States as productive as Harrison's.

Megahey was arrested by the FBI in 1982 after a successful sting operation, where he was trying to purchase surface-to-air missiles (SAMs) for the IRA, and sentenced to seven years in prison. Another devastating blow to any major IRA gunrunning attempt came in September 1984, when the FBI warned the Republic of Ireland that a major IRA arms shipment was underway from the United States, and that the weaponry would be transferred to an Irish fishing trawler in the Atlantic. Subsequently, Irish authorities discovered that the arms ship was a vessel named Marita Ann, allegedly after a tip-off from Sean O'Callaghan, the Garda Síochána informer within the IRA. Three Irish Naval Service ships confronted the vessel off the coast of County Kerry, and prevented its escape by firing warning shots. A team of naval personnel and Garda officers boarded the ship, arresting the crew of five and confiscating seven tons of military equipment, as well as medications, training manuals, and communications equipment. The weapons had allegedly been donated by the South Boston Winter Hill Irish Mob.

Andrew J. Wilson in his book Irish America and the Ulster Conflict 1968-1995 wrote that:

The most effective measures taken by US law enforcement agencies, however, were against IRA gunrunning . . . The convictions secured by US law enforcement agencies against the gunrunning network in the mid-1980s caused serious problems for the IRA. After the seizure of the Marita Ann, the Provos began to concentrate their arms procurement ventures in Europe and the Middle East. Although the IRA continued to ship some weapons from America, US authorities successfully undermined the transatlantic arms network.

=== Canada ===
In August 1969, some 150 Irish Canadians in Toronto announced that they intended to send money which could be used to buy guns, if necessary, to the Catholic women and children of the Bogside in Derry. The British Foreign Commonwealth Office (FCO) noted in the early 1970s that "the IRA has also looked to Irish communities elsewhere to obtain cash for its terror campaign of the past four years", and noted the presence of fundraising groups in Canada and Australia, and an attempt to establish connections in New Zealand.

Canadian authorities at first did nothing about the IRA fundraising in the country because collecting cash was considered a nonviolent pursuit that was not a threat to Canada. However, Britain told them the money raised in Canada was allegedly used to purchase weapons, including Canadian-made detonators being deployed for IRA bombing. Canadian IRA supporters smuggled detonators from Canadian mining operations for use in bombings in Northern Ireland. As a result, the Royal Canadian Mounted Police (RCMP) was charged with trying to intercept arms from flowing into Ireland from Canada.

In 1974, seven Irish Canadian residents were arrested by the RCMP for smuggling weapons to the IRA after "raids in St. Catharines, Tavistock and Toronto and at the U.S. border at Windsor". Philip Kent, one of those arrested, was discovered in his car for having "fifteen FN rifles and a .50 calibre machine gun". In February 1982, three Canadian republicans and Edward "Ted" Howell (a close ally of Gerry Adams) and Dessie Ellis from Dublin were arrested for trying to enter the U.S. illegally from Canada and "with a cache of money and a shopping list" of weapons for the IRA.

In 1993, Irish security forces uncovered an IRA bomb factory at Kilcock, County Kildare, discovering that parts of the detonating cord came from Canada. In 1994, a Canadian was arrested in Spain for attempting to deliver weapons to the IRA.

== Libyan/Middle Eastern arms ==
=== Libya ===
Libyan leader Muammar Gaddafi supplied a crucial number of arms to the IRA, as part of a strategy at this time of opposing United States interests in the Middle East by sponsoring paramilitary activity against it and its allies in Western Europe.

The first Libyan arms shipment to the IRA took place in 1972–1973, following visits by Joe Cahill to Libya. In early 1973, the Irish Government received intelligence that the vessel Claudia was carrying a consignment of weapons, and placed the ship under surveillance on 27 March. On 28 March, three Irish Navy patrol vessels intercepted the Claudia in Irish territorial waters near Helvick Head, County Waterford, seizing five tonnes of Libyan small arms and ammunition found on board. The weaponry seized included 250 Soviet-made small arms, 240 rifles, anti-tank mines and other explosives. Cahill himself was also found and arrested on board the vessel. It is estimated that three other shipments of weaponry of a similar size and nature succeeded in getting through to the IRA in the same time period. Ed Moloney reports that the early Libyan arms shipments provided the IRA with its first RPG-7 rocket-propelled grenade launchers, and that Gaddafi also gave three to five million US dollars at this time to the organisation to finance its activities. However contact with the Libyan government was broken off in 1976.

Contact with Libya was opened again in the aftermath of the 1981 Irish Hunger Strike, which was said to have impressed Gaddafi, just as the FBI successfully disrupted the IRA gunrunning operation in America that same year. In the 1980s, the IRA received further larger quantities of weaponry and explosives from the Libyan Government, reportedly enough to equip least two professional infantry battalions. Four shipments of guns, ammunition and explosives were made between 1985 and 1986, providing large quantities of modern weaponry to the IRA, including heavy machine guns, over 1,000 rifles, several hundred handguns, rocket-propelled grenades, flamethrowers, surface-to-air missiles, and Semtex explosive – an odourless explosive, invisible to X-ray, and many times more powerful than fertiliser-based bombs. From late 1986 onwards, virtually every bomb constructed by the Provisional IRA, and splinter groups such as the Real IRA, contained Semtex from a Libyan shipment unloaded at an Irish pier in 1986.

These shipments were partly in retaliation for the British Government's support for the US Air Force's (USAF) bombing attacks on Tripoli and Benghazi in 1986, which in turn were in retaliation for the 1986 bombing of the La Belle discotheque in Berlin. The USAF planes involved in the bombings had taken off from British bases on 14 April 1986, and Libya reportedly suffered 60 casualties in the attack. This second major Libyan contribution to the IRA came in 1986–1987.

There were four shipments which were not intercepted, in a huge intelligence failure of both Irish and British agencies, described as 'calamitous' by journalist Brendan O'Brien. The arm supplies from Libya developed as follows:

- The trawler Casamara took on 10 tonnes of weapons in September 1985 off the Maltese island of Gozo. These weapons were landed off the Clogga Strand near Arklow by inflatable boats some weeks later. The shipment contained 500 crates of AK-47s, pistols, hand grenades, ammunition and seven RPG-7s.
- Casamara (renamed Kula at this time), left Maltese waters on 6 October 1985 carrying a cache of DShK heavy machine guns.
- In July 1986, there was a shipment of 14 tonnes, including, according to the authorities, two SAM-7s.
- In October 1986, another shipment of 80 tonnes which included one tonne of Semtex, reportedly 10 SAM-7 missiles, more RPG-7s, AK-47s and hundreds of thousands of rounds of ammunition arrived aboard the oil-rig replenishment vessel Villa.

In total, the arms shipments included:

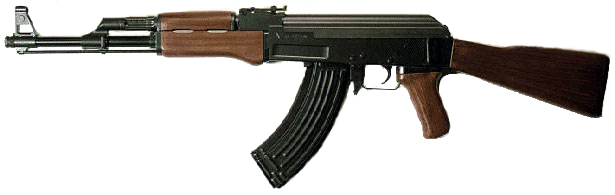
An AK-47 assault rifle (over 1000 of which were donated by Gaddafi to the IRA in the 1980s)

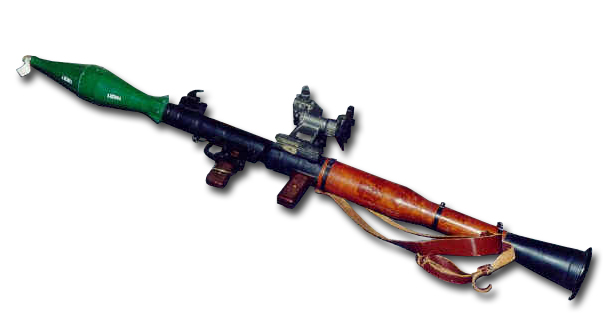
RPG-7

- 9mm Browning, Taurus, Glock and Beretta handguns
- AK-47 Kalashnikov and AKM assault rifles
- MP5 submachine guns
- RPG-7 anti-tank rocket launcher
- Soviet made DShK heavy machine guns
- FN MAG machine guns
- Military flamethrowers
- Semtex plastic explosive
- Strela 2 man portable SAMs

It is also estimated that the Libyan government gave the IRA the equivalent of £2 million along with the 1980s shipments. However, in 1992, Libya admitted to British officials that it gave the IRA over $12.5 million in cash (the equivalent of roughly $40 million in 2021).

On 1 November 1987, during transit to Ireland, one-third of the total Libyan arms consignment being carried aboard the MV Eksund was intercepted by the French Customs coast guard while the ship was in the Bay of Biscay, along with five crew members, among them Gabriel Cleary. The vessel was found to contain 120 tonnes of weapons, including HMGs, 36 RPGs, 1000 detonators, 20 SAMs, Semtex, 82mm mortars, 106mm cannons and 1,000,000 rounds of ammunition. Also, reportedly 24,000 pounds (11,000 kg) of tank shells were found, which could be adapted into explosive devices. Despite the seizure of the Eksund arms, the IRA was by then equipped with a quantity and quality of weaponry and explosives never available to it at any other phase of its history. Furthermore, according to Brendan O'Brien there was actually an 'over-supply', especially regarding the 600 AK-47s still in the hands of the IRA by 1992.

The Garda Síochána (the police service of Ireland) uncovered numerous arms destined for the IRA in 1988. These included several hundred AK-47s, Russian DSHK HMGs, FN MAG machine guns and Semtex.

By 1996, Jane's Intelligence Review reported that "it is believed that the bulk of the material presently in IRA arsenals was shipped from Libya in the mid-1980s with the aid of a skipper, Adrian Hopkins, hired for the purpose by the IRA."

==== Compensation claims ====
On 31 October 2009, a Democratic Unionist Party delegation of Northern Irish politicians travelled to the Libyan capital Tripoli for the first face to face meeting with Libyan government ministers to discuss compensation claims for victims of IRA violence. Sinn Féin president Gerry Adams criticized this move, saying if those Libya harmed should be given compensation, then so too should those injured by the UDA and the UVF supported by the British government. In The Guardian, Adams stated:

I support compensation for all victims. But this has to include the victims of British state violence and collusion. No one should be surprised by the hypocritical stance of successive British governments on this issue. The role of the British state in killing citizens in Ireland in recent times is well-documented. Apart from killings by state forces, British intelligence agencies also armed unionist paramilitaries, including Ulster Resistance, which was established by the DUP, and provided the information which led to countless deaths.

He pointed out the same should go out to the victims injured and families of those killed by British security forces themselves and acting in collusion with loyalist paramilitaries.

=== Palestine Liberation Organization ===
There was contact between the IRA and the Palestine Liberation Organization (PLO) and specifically the Popular Front for the Liberation of Palestine, starting from the mid-1970s which included the training of IRA volunteers. At one stage, the PLO offered weapons and training to the IRA, but it declined on the grounds that it was impossible to smuggle arms out of the Levant region in general and Palestine specifically without alerting Israeli intelligence. Tim Pat Coogan wrote that assistance from the PLO largely dried up in the mid-1980s after the PLO had forged stronger links with the Irish government.

== Mainland European arms ==
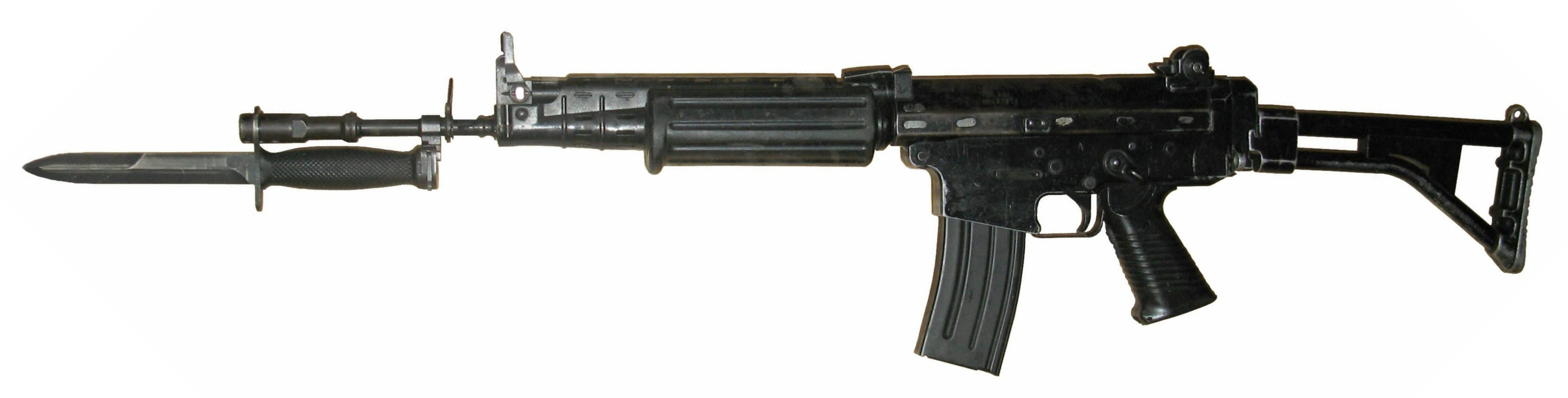
FN FNC

In the 1970s, some guns were purchased by Dáithí Ó Conaill in Czechoslovakia. On 16 October 1971, at Schiphol Airport, Dutch authorities seized the IRA arms shipment including modern submachine guns, rifles, and bazookas imported from the Czech arms manufacturer Omnipol.

In the 1980s, Belgian FN FNC rifles were acquired via the Netherlands and AG-3 and Automatkarbin 4 rifles from Norway and Sweden respectively were also secretly obtained. IRA supporters in the Netherlands assisted in the arms smuggling operations and provided safe houses for IRA operatives to lie low. On 26 January 1986, the Irish Garda uncovered the biggest ever IRA arms cache near the border in counties Roscommon and Sligo, including 95 rifles made in Russia, West Germany, East Germany, and Romania, as well as 21,560 rounds of ammunition, pistols, and other accessories worth £1 million on the black market. Bomb-making equipment discovered in Amsterdam in the mid-1980s was intended to be used in the IRA campaign in the UK.

In May 1987, three Heckler & Koch automatic rifles, a Belgian FN rifle, two FNC rifles, a Luger pistol, and a SPAS-12 shotgun were discovered following the Loughgall ambush; the Royal Ulster Constabulary (RUC) linked these guns to seven murders and 12 attempted murders in Northern Ireland. Former MI6 agent Tony Divall said that around August 1987, a Swiss arms dealer based in Zurich was trying to charter a 350-ton Panamanian vessel on behalf of the IRA. He named the Swiss dealer's bank in Lugano, his account number, and the bank official he used for the arms deal. The dealer denied any knowledge, saying "Whoever your contact is must be a mad dog."

== Last arms deals ==
In the late 1980s and 1990s, the Provisional IRA South Armagh Brigade smuggled in a number of Barrett M82 and Barrett M90 .50 BMG rifles from the United States. These weapons were used by two South Armagh sniper teams to conduct a sniping campaign against British Army patrols operating in the area. The last British soldier killed in Northern Ireland during The Troubles, Stephen Restorick, was shot dead by a sniper in South Armagh in February 1997. Soon after, in April 1997, the leader of one of the sniper squads, Michael Caraher, and other IRA volunteers were arrested and a Barrett rifle seized. A bolt-action .50 BMG rifle stamped with the word 'Tejas' (Spanish for Texas) on the butt manufactured by a former Barrett gunsmith based in Texas. was also recovered in Belfast in August 1993; British security forces believed it had been used in attacks in preceding months and dubbed it the "Tejas Rifle." Earlier, in August 1986 Gardaí had intercepted an arms consignment in the Central Sorting Office in Dublin that included a Barret M82 and ammunition, posted from Chicago.

Despite its ceasefires of 1994 and 1997 the IRA continued to buy arms. It needed a new source of weapons, since the Libyan pipeline had been closed and smuggling from the United States became far more difficult due to its transatlantic gunrunning network in the country being disrupted by American authorities in the early 1980s. In May 1996, the Federal Security Service (FSB), Russia's internal security service, publicly accused Estonia of arms smuggling, and claimed that the IRA had contacted representatives of Estonia's volunteer defence force, Kaitseliit, and some non-government groups to buy weapons. However the Russian report did not say when the contacts had taken place. In July 1999, three men, Anthony Smyth, Conor Claxton, and Martin Mullan, along with an accomplice, Siobhan Browne, were arrested by the American FBI and ATF agencies and accused of buying 44 handguns from arms dealers in Florida in the United States and posting 15 of the weapons to Ireland and the United Kingdom. Later estimates put the number of guns sent to Ireland at more than 100 pistols and machine pistols. All three men were cleared of conspiracy to aid terrorists and to commit murder. They were later sentenced on the less serious smuggling charge. The IRA leadership denied knowledge of the arms buys.

In April 2002 it was reported in media outlets that the IRA had bought at least twenty Russian AN-94 assault rifles in Moscow in late 2001. Russian security services were said to have detected the deal and passed details to British military intelligence in London.

== Timeline: The IRA's importation of weapons ==
- In 1969 the IRA received its first cache of weapons from the Harrison network with 70 small arms comprising M1 carbines, M3 "grease gun" submachine guns, some handguns, and 60,000 rounds of ammunition.
- In 1970, the IRA receives weapons from Basque organisation ETA. This includes around 50 revolvers.
- In May 1970, Irish politicians Charles Haughey, Neil Blaney, and John Kelly, Irish Army Captain James Kelly, and Belgian businessman Albert Luykx were acquitted during the Arms Crisis of smuggling weapons to the IRA during the beginning of the conflict.
- In 1971, the IRA receives its first consignments of Armalite rifles. They include around 100 AR-15 and AR-180 rifles, on the Queen Elizabeth 2 (New York to Southampton).
- Later that year Gardaí recover six suitcases full of 5.56×45mm ammunition at Dublin Port arriving on a ship from the US.
- Again in 1971, IRA leader Dáithí Ó Conaill arranges for weapons to be bought off Czechoslovak arms company Omnipol in Prague. The arms are seized at Schiphol Airport, The Netherlands.
- In 1972 Colonel Gaddafi sends his first arms shipments to Ireland, a small shipment of around ten weapons and some explosives.
- Once again in 1972, the IRA buy RPG-7 rocket launchers from unknown sources in Europe.
- In November 1972 2.5 tons of weapons were flown from Tripoli, Libya to Shannon Airport. Shipment consisted of 25 RPG-7 launchers, 120 RPG projectiles with high explosive warhead, 376 with HEAT warhead. Pilots were both Jewish Canadians and aboard the airlift was Provisional IRA Quartermaster General Denis MacInerney.
- The IRA receives another batch of M16 and AR-15 rifles from the Harrison network.
- In 1973 the IRA receives another consignment of arms from Libya but the arms are intercepted on board the Claudia by members of the Gardaí. Leading IRA man Joe Cahill and others arrested. The shipment consisted of 250 AK-47 rifles and other materiel.
- In 1974, the FBI foil an IRA attempt to buy 100 M16 rifles.
- In 1974, seven Irish Canadians are arrested by the Royal Canadian Mounted Police (RCMP) for smuggling weapons to the IRA after "raids in St. Catharines, Tavistock and Toronto and at the U.S. border at Windsor". Philip Kent, one of those arrested, is discovered in his car for having "fifteen FN rifles and a .50 calibre machine gun".
- In 1977 the PLO (Al-Fatah) sends arms to the IRA. They are intercepted at Antwerp. An IRA man is arrested by Gardaí. The arms are believed to have come from Lebanon.
- In 1977, six M60 machine guns and around 100 M16 rifles are stolen from a US Army base and shipped to Ireland.
- Between 1973 and 1978, 500,000 rounds of 5.56×45mm NATO ammunition stolen from a US Marine base are successfully sent to the IRA.
- 1979 The Gardaí seize a cargo of more than 150 guns and 60,000 rounds of ammunition. including two M60 machine guns, 15 M16 rifles, a number of M14 rifles, and an AK-47 sent from the US.
- In 1982 US customs discover a truck at the docks of Newark, New Jersey. Four members of an IRA cell are arrested. The shipment contained 50 firearms and frequency switches for detonating bombs, to counter British Army jamming of most IRA signals for detonating bombs.
- Later that year, three Canadian IRA supporters and Edward "Ted" Howell (a close ally of Gerry Adams) and Dessie Ellis from Dublin are arrested for entering the US from Canada, during a plot to acquire 200 cases of ammunition for the IRA.
- In 1983 the FBI foils an IRA attempt to buy explosives.
- In 1984 An IRA arms shipment is seized on the fishing boat Marita Ann by the Irish Navy. Men jailed in the US and Ireland. Seven tons of arms, ammunition and explosives procured by the Winter Hill Gang in Boston, US.
- In 1985 The FBI foils another IRA bid to buy small arms in Colorado. An Irishman is deported.
- In 1986, 40 firearms, including: 13 FN FAL rifles, an AK-47, two hand grenades, drums of nitrobenzene, 70,000 rounds of ammunition are seized in the Netherlands by Dutch police. IRA members Gerry Kelly and Brendan McFarlane were arrested.
- Irish police seize ten AG-3 rifles in 1986, part of a batch of 100 stolen from a Norwegian Reserve base near Oslo by a criminal gang and sold to the IRA.
- The IRA attempt to buy Redeye SAMs, M60 machine guns, M16 rifles, MP5 submachine guns and 11 bullet-proof vests, but are caught in an FBI sting operation.
- Between 1985–87 four shipments of arms and explosives successfully landed in Ireland by boat skipper Adrian Hopkins, totalling around 150 tons. The fifth, on Eksund, is intercepted by French Customs. Libya had sent a total of 300 tons of weaponry including 150 tons of Romanian AKMs, SA-7s, Semtex-H, RPG-7 rocket launchers, Taurus pistols, and other materiel.
- In 1988 a total 380 gallons of nitrobenzene from the Netherlands are seized by Gardaí in a truck.
- In 1988 US Customs foil bid to buy rifles from a gun dealer in Alabama. Two men who attempted to buy high-powered rifles are jailed.
- Detonators for bombs and parts for an anti-aircraft missile system are seized, and a number of IRA members and a NASA scientist are arrested by FBI after a long covert spying operation that began in 1982. A group of IRA supporters are jailed in Boston in 1990 for trying to smuggle a home-made missile system to Ireland.
- 1988–90 FBI foils plot to acquire FIM-92 Stinger missiles on black market in Miami. Several arrests are made.
- Late 1980s and early 1990s: The IRA manage to obtain half a dozen Barrett rifles and other .50 cal sniper rifles, all destined for the South Armagh Sniper teams.
- In 1994, a Canadian was arrested in Spain for attempting to deliver weapons to the IRA.

== Decommissioning of arms ==
Following the announcement of its cessation of violence and commitment to exclusively peaceful means, the Provisional IRA decommissioned its arms in July–September 2005. Among the weaponry estimated, (by Jane's Information Group), to have been destroyed as part of this process were:

- 1,000 rifles
- 2 tonnes of Semtex
- 20–30 heavy machine guns
- 7 surface-to-air missiles
- 7 flame throwers
- 1,200 detonators
- 11 rocket-propelled grenade launchers
- 90 handguns
- 100+ grenades

The panel overseeing the decommissioning of IRA weaponry and weapons stockpiles, the Independent International Commission on Decommissioning (IICD) headed by General de Chastelain oversaw the decommissioning process. The decommissioning process has taken place using estimates of IRA weaponry submitted by the British and Irish Governments. de Chastelain said he had seen rifles, particularly AK-47s, machine guns, ground-to-air missiles, explosives, explosive material, mortars, flame throwers, handguns, timer units and ballistic caps, and some weaponry that was "very old", including a Bren machine gun.

The IICD's final report was issued on 26 September 2005 and the panel stated to the press:

We have observed and verified events to put beyond use very large quantities of arms which we believe include all the arms in the IRA's possession… Our new inventory is consistent with these estimates. We are satisfied that the arms decommissioning represents the totality of the IRA's arsenal.

and while it could not report on the quantity or types of weapons destroyed it said:

The experience of seeing this with our own eyes, on a minute-to-minute basis, provided us with evidence so clear and of its nature so incontrovertible that at the end of the process [IRA weapon decommissioning] it demonstrated to us – and would have demonstrated to anyone who might have been with us – that beyond any shadow of doubt, the arms of the IRA have now been decommissioned.

Irish Taoiseach (Prime Minister) Bertie Ahern also stated at the time:

The weapons of the IRA are gone, and are gone in a manner which has been verified and witnessed.

However, despite the conclusion of the IICD agreeing with the figures provided by the British security forces, unnamed sources in MI5 and the PSNI have reported to the press that not all IRA arms were destroyed during the process, a claim which so far remains unsubstantiated. These reports have since been scotched by the group overseeing the activities of paramilitaries in Northern Ireland – the Independent Monitoring Commission (IMC). In its latest report, dated April 2006, the IMC points out that it has no reason to disbelieve the IRA or information to suspect that the group has not fully decommissioned. Rather, it indicated that any weaponry that had not been handed in had been retained by individuals outside the IRA's control. Excerpt from the IMC's 10th report:

Indeed, our present assessment is that such of the arms as were reported to us as having been retained, would have been withheld under local control despite the instructions of the leadership. We note that, as reported by the Independent International Commission on Decommissioning (IICD), the leadership claimed only to have decommissioned all the arms "under its control". The relevant points are that the amount of un-surrendered material was not significant in comparison to what was decommissioned and that these reports do not cast doubt on the declared intention of the IRA leadership to eschew terrorism and to follow the political path. We will continue to monitor the position.

== See also ==
- List of weapons used by the Provisional Irish Republican Army
- Florida Four
- Colm Murphy
- Gerry McGeough
- Whitey Bulger
- Martin Ferris
- Patrick Nee
- Howth gun-running
- SS Libau
