= John Mullin =

John Mullin may refer to:

- Jack Mullin (1913–1999), American pioneer in the field of magnetic tape sound recording
- John Mullin (footballer) (born 1975), English association footballer
- John Mullin (journalist) (born 1964), British newspaper editor
- John W. Mullin (1925–2009), British chemical engineer known for crystallization

== See also ==
- John Mullins (disambiguation)
