= Ruth González =

Ruth González may refer to:

- Ruth González Mullen (1939–2009), Cuban American artist
- Ruth González Silva (born 1986), Mexican politician
