= Mullen (disambiguation) =

Mullen is a surname.

Mullen may also refer to:

== Places in the United States ==
- Mullen, California, a former settlement
- Mullen, Nebraska, a village
- Mullen Township, Boyd County, Nebraska

== Businesses ==
- Mullen Advertising, original name of MullenLowe U.S., an advertising and marketing strategy firm based in Boston
- Mullen Automotive, an American electric vehicle manufacturer
- Mullen Newspaper Company, an American newspaper publisher

== Other uses ==
- Mullen High School, Denver, Colorado, United States

== See also ==
- Mullen Gang, an Irish-American gang which operat in Boston from c. the 1950s to 1972
- Mullens, West Virginia, USA
- Mullins (surname)
- Moylan
- Maelan mac Cathmogha
- Mac Maoláin
- McMullen, a surname
- Mullens (disambiguation)
- Mullins (disambiguation)
- Mullin, a surname
- Verbascum, common name mullein
