= P. N. Rowe =

British chemical engineer

P. N. Rowe FREng FIChemE
- Born: Peter Noël Rowe; 25 December 1919; Preston, Lancashire, England
- Died: 27 April 2014 (aged 94)
- Education: Manchester College of Technology, Imperial College London
- Known for: Chemical Engineering
- Spouse: Pauline Garmirian
- Children: 2
- Scientific career
- Fields: Chemical Engineering
- Workplaces: Atomic Energy Research Establishment, University College London

Peter Noël Rowe (25 December 1919 - 27 April 2014)) was a Ramsay Memorial Professor of Chemical Engineering at University College London and former president of the Institution of Chemical Engineers.

== Education and career ==
Rowe attended Preston Grammar School, before leaving to become a technician. During World War II, Rowe worked for the RAF, and did a part time HNC in mechanical engineering with Liverpool Technical College.

After being demobbed from the RAF, Rowe joined Manchester College of Technology as an undergraduate in chemical engineering, graduating in 1949. Rowe continued his education, joining Imperial College London to complete a PhD under the tutorage of Dudley Newitt. Between 1954 and 1958, Rowe worked for the Ministry of Supply, continuing his work on investigating supersonic flow through rocket nozzles which he had started at Imperial College London.

In 1958, Rowe was made the principal scientific officer at the Atomic Energy Research Establishment at Harwell, Oxfordshire. While at the establishment, Rowe worked on the ideas of fluidisation that had been promoted by John Davidson, proving some of the theories using innovative experiments. He wrote and co-wrote several papers on the subject.

In 1965, Rowe completed his Doctor of Science at the Imperial College London and replaced M. B. Donald as the Ramsay professor of chemical engineering at University College London. His appointment was described by J. R. Yates and A. R. Burgess as an inspired appointment, and he greatly increased the department and its reputation during his tenure. This included a new MSc in Chemical Process Engineering, and changing the BSc course which had not been amended since 1937. He continued to work on fluidisation research at University College London.

In 1961, he was made a fellow of the Institution of Chemical Engineers, serving as the president between 1981 and 1982, and serving on several committees. He served as one of the honorary secretarys for the Royal Academy of Engineering between 1982 and 1985. In 1985 Rowe retired from University College London, being replaced as the Ramsay professor of chemical engineering by colleague J. W. Mullin, and being named as Professor Emeritus. Rowe continued to work and was a member of the chemical engineering panel of the Research Assessment Exercise, jointly run by the Higher Education Funding Council for England, the Scottish Funding Council, the Higher Education Funding Council for Wales and the Department for Employment and Learning, Northern Ireland.

== Awards ==
In 1972, Rowe with D J Everitt were jointly awarded the IChemE Moulton Medal for the most meritorious paper published by IChemE during that year. In 1984, Rowe was made a Liveryman of the Worshipful Company of Engineers.

In 1987, Rowe was honored with a special edition of the journal Chemical Engineering Communications.

== Personal life ==
Rowe was born on the 25 December 1919 in Preston, Lancashire as the eldest son of Charles Henry Rowe and Kate Winifred (née Storry). In 1952 he married Pauline Garmirian and had two sons, Timothy David and Andrew Francis. Rowe made regular donations to the Royal Academy of Engineerings development appeal.
