= M. B. Donald =

British chemist

M. B. Donald FRIC FIChemE FRHistS
- Born: Maxwell Bruce Donald; 1897
- Died: 6 January 1978 (aged 80–81)
- Education: University College London; Massachusetts Institute of Technology
- Known for: Chemistry
- Awards: Fellow of the Institution of Chemical Engineers; IChemE Moulton Medal; IChemE Osborne Reynolds Medal; Elected Fellow of the Royal Historical Society
- Scientific career
- Fields: Chemistry; Chemical Engineering
- Workplaces: Royal College of Science; University College London; Imperial College London

Maxwell Bruce Donald (1897 - 6 January 1978) was a Ramsay Memorial Professor of Chemical Engineering at University College London and a historian specialising in mining.

== Early career ==
Donald studied at the Royal College of Science and Massachusetts Institute of Technology. In 1921 he became a Sir Alfred Yarrow Scholar, before becoming a physical chemistry demonstrator for the Royal College of Science. He left the Royal College in 1925 to become a chemical engineer for the Chilean Nitrate Producers Association, before joining Royal Dutch Shell in 1929 as an adviser on bitumen emulsions.

In 1932, Donald joined the chemical engineering department at University College London as a lecturer and researcher under W. E. Gibbs. During the 1930s, Donald worked with the professor of biochemistry, Sir Jack Drummond on the isolation of Vitamin A and B from fish liver oil and wheat germ.

In 1937, Donald was made honorary secretary of the Institution of Chemical Engineers. In addition, Donald was a member of the Royal Institute of Chemistry Council and the Joint Library Committee of the Chemical Society.

During the Second World War, Donald was part of the Special Operations Executive Inter Services Research Bureau under Dudley Newitt. He also continued to lecture, joining Imperial College London after the bombing of the Ramsay Laboratory at UCL.

== Later career ==
During 1947 Donald became a reader in the department at University College London. In 1950, Donald was promoted to vice president of the Institution of Chemical Engineers.

In 1951 Donald replaced H. E. Watson as the Ramsay professor of Chemical engineering at University College London. During this time the department greatly increased, with Donald overseeing the design and construction of a new building.

Donald was the initial academic liaison and member of the editorial board of the journal Chemical Engineering Science which launched in October 1951. At UCL, Donald worked with Eric Mitchell Crook on developing the discipline of biochemical engineering, including the production the first coenzyme A in Britain from yeast as part of a Medical Research Council project. With Ernest Baldwin, head of biochemistry, Donald set up a joint diploma in 1959, later a masters programme in biochemical engineering at UCL.

Donald retired in 1965 and was replaced as the Ramsay professor of Chemical Engineering by P. N. Rowe.

== Historian ==
Donald was a keen historian and published a number of works: History of the Chile nitrate industry (1936), Burchard Kranich (c. 1515–1578), miner and queens physician, Cornish mining stamps, antimony and, Frobishers gold (1950), Elizabethan Copper:The History of the Company of the Mines Royal 1568-1605 (1955) and Elizabethan Monopolies: The History of the Company of Mineral and Battery Works from 1565 to 1604 (1961). Donald was the historian of the Society of Mines Royal. His work on mining history was recognised by being elected a fellow of the Royal Historical Society. Donald had planned to restore a Cornish tin mine but due to bad health he had to abandon his plans.

== Awards ==
In 1937, Donald won the Institution of Chemical Engineers senior Moulton Medal. Donald was awarded the Osborne Reynolds medal in 1940, for his most meritorious long-term contribution to the progress of the Institution.

The Institution of Chemical Engineers named its award for to an individual for outstanding services in biochemical engineering. The Donald Medal has been awarded by the Biochemical Engineering Special Interest Group since 1989.
