= CT Value =

CT Values are an important part of calculating disinfectant dosage for the chlorination of drinking water. A CT value is the product of the concentration of a disinfectant (e.g. free chlorine) and the contact time with the water being disinfected. It is typically expressed in units of mg-min/L.

The goal of disinfection is the inactivation of microorganisms. This depends on: the microorganism, the disinfectant being used, the concentration of the disinfectant, the contact time, and the temperature and pH of the water.

== Kinetics ==
The disinfection kinetics are conventionally calculated via the Chick-Watson model, named for the work of Harriette Chick and H. E. Watson. This model is expressed by the following equation:

$$\ln(\frac{N}{N_0})=-\Lambda_{CW} C^n t \!$$

Where:

- $(\frac{N}{N_0}) \!$ is the survival ratio for the microorganisms being killed
- $\Lambda_{CW} \!$ is the Chick-Watson coefficient of specific lethality
- $C \!$ is the concentration of the disinfectant (typically in mg/L)
- $n \!$ is the coefficient of dilution, frequently assumed to be 1
- $t \!$ is the contact time (typically in minutes or seconds)

The survival ratio is commonly expressed as an inactivation ratio (in %) or as the number of reductions in the order of magnitude of the microorganism concentration. For example, a situation where N_{0}=10^{7} CFU/L and N=10^{4} CFU/L would be reported as a 99.9% inactivation or "3-log_{10}" removal.

In water treatment practice, tables of the product C×t are used to calculate disinfection dosages. The calculated CT value is the product of the disinfectant residual (in mg/L) and the detention time (in minutes), through the section at peak hourly flow. These tables express the required CT values to achieve a desired removal of microorganisms of interest in drinking water (e.g. Giardia lamblia cysts) for a given disinfectant under constant temperature and pH conditions. A portion of such a table is reproduced below.

== Example CT Table ==
CT Values for the Inactivation of Giardia Cysts by Free Chlorine at 5 °C and pH ≈ 7.0:

Chlorine Concentration (mg/L)	1 log inactivation (mg·L^{−1}·min)	2 log inactivation (mg·L^{−1}·min)	3 log inactivation (mg·L^{−1}·min)
0.6	48	95	143
1.2	51	101	152
1.8	54	108	162
2.4	57	115	172

Full tables are much larger than this example and should be obtained from the regulatory agency for a particular jurisdiction.

== See also ==
- Chlorination
- Disinfectant
