= Michael Mullen (disambiguation) =

Michael Mullen (born 1946) is a US Navy admiral and a former chairman of the Joint Chiefs of Staff for the US military.

Michael Mullen may also refer to:

- Michael Mullen (Irish politician) (1919–1982), Irish Labour Party politician represented Dublin North West from 1961 to 1969
- Michael Mullen (novelist), Irish novelist based in Mayo
- Michael M. Mullen (1918–1978), Pennsylvania politician

== See also ==
- Mike Mullane (born 1945), former astronaut and author
- USS Michael G. Mullen (DDG-144), Arleigh Burke-class guided missile destroyer
- Mike Mullin (disambiguation)
