= Ramsay Memorial Professor of Chemical Engineering =

Named professorship at University College London

The Ramsay Memorial Chair of Chemical Engineering is a named professorship in the Department of Chemical Engineering at UCL, established along with the department and the Ramsay Memorial Laboratory in 1923. They are named after Nobel Prize recipient William Ramsay. The chair was the first created for Chemical Engineering in the United Kingdom. The current professor is Marc-Olivier Coppens.

== Ramsay Memorial Professors of Chemical Engineering ==
- 1923–1928 E. C. Williams
- 1928–1935 William Edward Gibbs
- 1934–1937 H. E. Watson
- 1951–1965 M. B. Donald
- 1965–1985 P. N. Rowe
- 1985–1991 J. W. Mullin
- 1991–1996 A. Cornish
- 1996–2003 J. G. Yates
- 2003–2012 A. G. Jones
- 2012- Marc-Olivier Coppens
