= Joe Cahill =

Irish republican (1920–2004)

Joe Cahill Irish: Seosamh Ó Cathail
- Cahill, early 1990s.
- Born: 19 May 1920; Belfast, Ireland
- Died: 23 July 2004 (aged 84); Belfast, Northern Ireland
- Military career
- Allegiance: Provisional Irish Republican Army
- Units: Belfast Brigade
- Commands: Chief of Staff
- Conflict: The Troubles

Joe Cahill (Irish: Seosamh Ó Cathail; 19 May 1920 – 23 July 2004) was a prominent figure in the Irish republican movement in Northern Ireland and former chief of staff of the Provisional Irish Republican Army (IRA). He joined a junior-republican movement, Na Fianna Eireann, in 1937 and the following year, joined the Irish Republican Army. In 1969, Cahill was a key figure in the founding of the Provisional Irish Republican Army. During his time in the Provisional IRA, Cahill helped import weapons and raise financial support. He served as the chief of staff in 1972, but was arrested the following year when a ship importing weapons was intercepted.

After his release, he continued to serve on the IRA Army Council and lead all financial dealings for Sinn Féin. In the 1990s, the IRA and Sinn Féin began to work on seeking peace. Cahill served on the council that called a cessation on 21 July 1997. Cahill attended several of the talks that finally led to the Good Friday Agreement on 10 April 1998. Shortly after the agreement was made, Cahill resigned as treasurer of Sinn Féin. To honour his service, he was made honorary Sinn Féin vice-president for life. Cahill served the republican movement in Ireland all his life, as one of the longest-serving political activists in Ireland of any political party.

== Background ==
Cahill was born above his father's small printing shop at 60 Divis Street on 19 May 1920 in West Belfast.

Cahill was the first child of eleven siblings born to Joseph and Josephine Cahill. Both of his parents supported republicanism. Cahill spoke of his family's interest in Irish culture and history: "I was always taught to attend to things that were Irish. For instance, do Irish dancing. Do Irish things, a lot. In the house there would be lots of Irish history books. You wouldn't be forced to read them, but because they were in the house you would naturally read them. I suppose from that point of view there was a certain amount of indoctrination." His father was involved with the Irish National Volunteers and would print republican material at his print shop. Joseph Senior applied to be a part of the Irish Republican Army but was asked to remain in the print business as his way of assisting the republican movement. He was arrested in 1932 for printing illegal material, but was acquitted for any crimes. Cahill's childhood was marked by hardship and his family was very poor. Cahill's grandparents were neighbours of the Scottish-born Irish socialist and Easter Rising leader James Connolly, who co-founded the Irish Citizens Army.

Cahill was educated at St. Mary's Christian Brothers' School, then located on Barrack Street. At age 14 he left school to assist in the print shop. Soon after, he joined the Catholic Young Men's Society, which campaigned on social issues with a focus on eradicating moneylenders from working-class areas of Belfast, as they often charged usurious interest rates. At the age of seventeen, Cahill then joined Na Fianna Eireann, a republican-orientated Scouting movement. Na Fianna Eireann was regarded as the "Junior Irish Republican Army".

== Early paramilitary career ==
The following year, 1938, at the age of 18, Cahill joined the local Clonard-based 'C' Company of the Belfast Brigade of the Irish Republican Army. By 1942, Cahill was serving as second in command. That year, during an anniversary march by the IRA for the Easter Rising, Cahill got into a shootout with five other IRA men against four Royal Ulster Constabulary Officers. Several men were wounded and Constable Patrick Murphy was killed. Cahill and four of the other men spent time in prison in Belfast, where they were interrogated daily. Tom Williams, the sixth IRA man to be charged, spent time in the Royal Victoria Hospital due to his injuries. It was there that he made a statement taking full responsibility for killing Constable Patrick Murphy. All six men were found guilty and sentenced to death in August 1942. The men's legal team managed to suspend the execution date after the verdict. An appeal campaign began and 207,000 signatures were collected. The United States State Department and the Vatican also supported the campaign. As a result, the men's sentences were changed to life in prison, except for Tom Williams who was executed.

The IRA declared a formal ceasefire in 1945. Afterwards, republican prisoners began to be released. Cahill, Perry, Oliver, Cordner and Simpson, who had all been sentenced to life in prison, became free men in October 1949. Following his release from prison, Cahill got a job at the Harland and Wolff shipyards in Belfast. It was at the shipyards where he was said to have contracted the disease asbestosis, one of the causes of his death many years later.

In 1953, Cahill had an accident on the job when he was hit on the head by scaffolding. He subsequently spent time recovering in a convalescent home. After he recovered, he travelled to Leixlip near Dublin to visit his aunt. It was there that he met Annie Magee. Joe and Annie were married on 2 April 1956 in St John's Church on the Falls Road in Belfast. Together they had seven children. Annie was said to be his best friend.

The IRA launched a new campaign in 1956. The IRA border campaign attacked ten targets in Northern Ireland, damaging bridges, courthouses and border roads. By 1957, three RUC officers and seven republicans had been killed during the campaign. Cahill was arrested and interned in January 1957 with several other republicans. In the same year, Cahill's first son was born and was named Thomas, after Tom Williams. Cahill was released from internment in April 1961.

== Founding the Provisional IRA ==
Following his release from prison, Cahill was disappointed at the direction of the IRA. They had given up armed struggle, and desired seats in elections. Failed campaigns led to the IRA becoming weak and disorganised. Cahill resigned from the IRA around 1962.

In August 1969, intense rioting broke out in Northern Ireland, the most violent being in Belfast. In the 1969 Northern Ireland riots, Cahill, along with Billy McKee, tried to defend the Catholic Clonard area from attack, but was unable to prevent Bombay Street being burned by Ulster Protestant rioters. When he subsequently tried to organise the defence of the Ballymurphy area, he was initially chased away by its Catholic residents. The 1969 Northern Ireland riots displaced 1,800 families from their homes. It was a humiliation for the IRA and made evident that they could not protect their people. The slogan 'IRA: I Ran Away' was painted on walls all over Belfast. The riots were said to be the beginning of "the Troubles" in Northern Ireland.

Later that year, Cahill was a key figure in founding the Provisional Irish Republican Army. Angry at the failure of the IRA (led in Belfast by Billy McMillen) to defend Catholic areas during the communal rioting, Cahill and McKee stated in September 1969 that they would no longer be taking orders from the IRA leadership in Dublin, or from McMillen. In December 1969, they declared their allegiance to the Provisional IRA, which had split away from the leadership. This action took 9 out of the 13 units of the IRA in Belfast into the Provisional IRA. The remnants of the pre-split IRA became known as the Official IRA. The Provisional IRA was created and an executive council of 12 men was elected. Of the executive members, seven, one of whom was Joe Cahill, were elected to serve as the Provisional Army Council. Cahill also served as the second-in-command to Billy McKee, OC of the Belfast Battalion.

== Provisional IRA activities ==
In April 1971, after the arrest and imprisonment of Billy McKee, Cahill became the commander of the Provisional IRA Belfast Brigade. He held this post until the introduction of internment in August of that year. It was during this period that the Provisional IRA campaign got off the ground in the city. Cahill authorised the beginning of the IRA's bombing campaign as well as attacks on British troops and the RUC. He based himself in a house in Andersonstown and toured the city, co-ordinating IRA activity. The day after the British Army mounted Operation Demetrius, designed to arrest the IRA's leaders, Cahill held a press conference in a school in Ballymurphy and stated that the operation had been a failure. He said, "we have lost one brigade officer, one battalion officer and the rest are volunteers, or as they say in the British Army, privates". To avoid the propaganda defeat that his capture would then have entailed, Cahill fled to the Republic of Ireland, temporarily relinquishing his command of the Belfast Brigade.

In March 1972, Cahill was part of an IRA delegation that held direct talks with the British Labour Party leader Harold Wilson. However, although the IRA called a three-day ceasefire for the talks, no permanent end to violence was agreed upon. Upon his return to Ireland, Cahill was arrested in Dublin by Gardaí and charged with IRA membership. He went on hunger strike for twenty-three days and was subsequently released due to lack of evidence. In November 1972, Cahill became the IRA's chief of staff and held this position until his arrest the following year.

Cahill was then put in charge of importing arms for the IRA. He liaised with the NORAID group in America and with the Libyan dictatorship of Muammar Gaddafi to this end. On March 29, 1973 he was arrested by the Irish Navy in Waterford, aboard the Claudia, a ship from Libya loaded with five tons of weapons. Cahill was sentenced to three years imprisonment by the Irish Special Criminal Court. Cahill stated at his trial that, "If I am guilty of any crime, it is that I did not succeed in getting the contents of the Claudia into the hands of the freedom fighters in this country".

Upon his release, Cahill again was put in charge of arms importation and to this end went to the United States. He was deported from the United States in 1984 for illegal entry (see Provisional IRA arms importation). He served on the IRA Army Council as late as the 1990s. In the late 1970s and early 1980s, he argued against proposals for Sinn Féin to stand in elections. However, in 1985, he spoke at the party's Ard Fheis in favour of republicans contesting elections and taking seats in the Dublin parliament, the Dáil.

== Peace process ==
In his later years as honorary life vice-president of Sinn Féin, Cahill was a strong supporter of Gerry Adams and the Good Friday Agreement. In 1994, a controversial but central aspect of the IRA's ceasefire was the granting of a limited visa by then United States President Bill Clinton to Cahill, in the face of opposition by John Major's government, for the purpose of trying to win support for the new Sinn Féin peace strategy from Irish American IRA supporters.

In 1998 he stood in North Antrim in the elections to the Northern Ireland Assembly, but was unsuccessful, coming tenth with 4.07% of the people's votes.

== Death ==
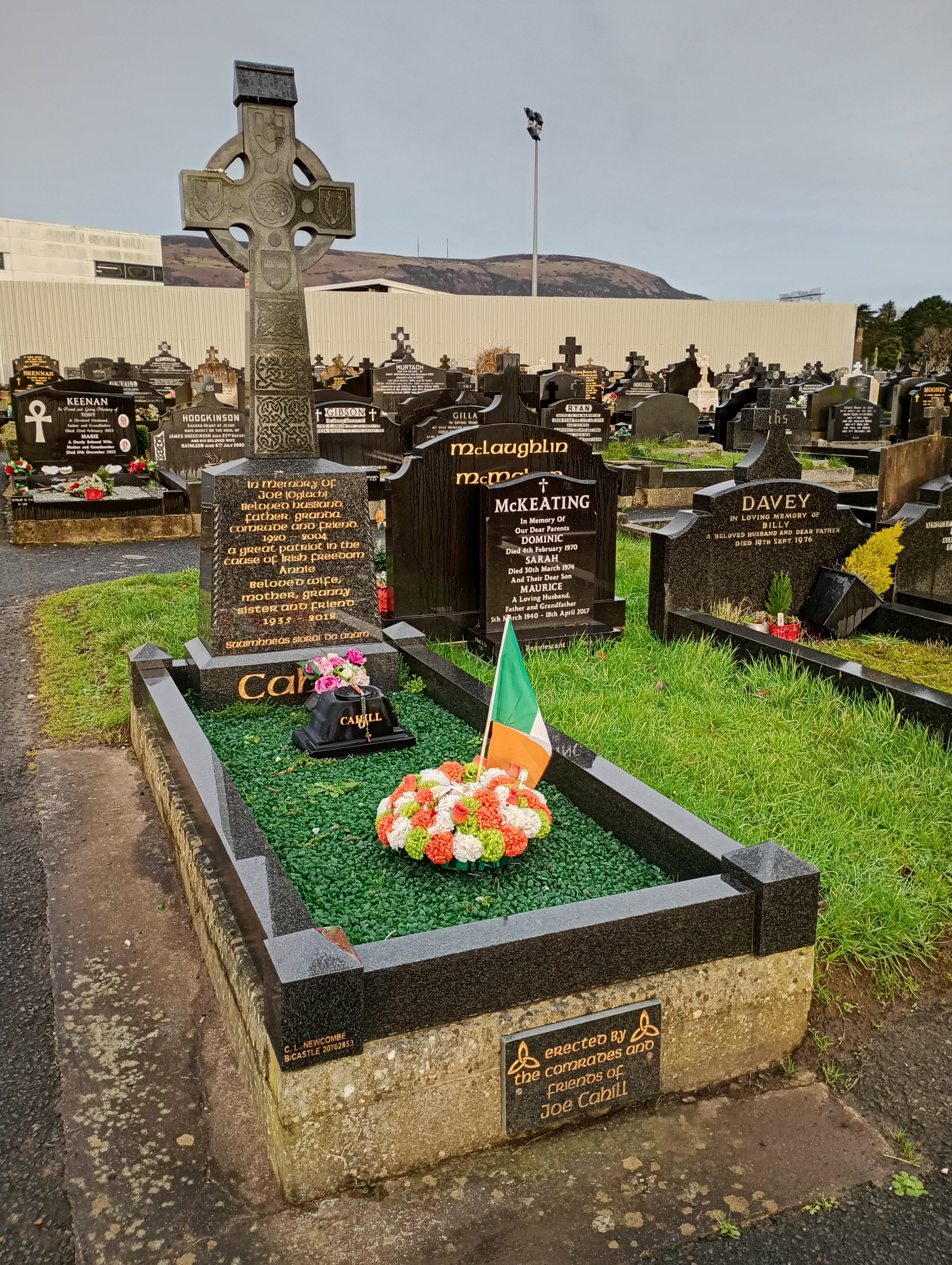
Cahill's grave in Milltown Cemetery, Belfast

Cahill died at age 84 in Belfast. He had been diagnosed with asbestosis, which he probably developed while working at the Harland & Wolff shipyards in his twenties. He and several other former shipyard workers later sued the company for their exposure to the dangerous substances but only won minimal compensation. An Irish republican flute band in Glasgow is named after Cahill.

== Bibliography ==
- Richard English, Armed Struggle – A History of the IRA, MacMillan, London 2003; ISBN 1-4050-0108-9
- Ed Moloney, The Secret History of the IRA:
  Published by Allen Lane (2002), Hardcover: ISBN 071399665X/ISBN 9780713996654
  Published Penguin Books Ltd (2003), Paperback: ISBN 014101041X/ISBN 9780141010410
- Eamonn Mallie and Patrick Bishop, The Provisional IRA, Corgi, London 1988; ISBN 0-552-13337-X
- Brendan O'Brien, The Long War – The IRA and Sinn Féin. O'Brien Press, Dublin 1995; ISBN 0-86278-359-3

Party political offices
| Preceded by Noel Kavanagh? | General Secretary of Sinn Féin c.1970–1984? With: Walter Lynch (c.1970–1980); Cathleen Knowles (1980–1983) | Succeeded by Tom Hartley? |
| Preceded by Dáithí Ó Conaill; Máire Drumm | Vice President of Sinn Féin; 1976–1978? With: Dáithí Ó Conaill (1976–1978); Gerry Adams (1978?) | Succeeded by Dáithí Ó Conaill; Gerry Adams |
