= Peter Hoagland =

American politician (1941–2007)

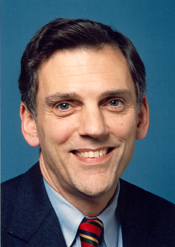

Member of the U.S. House of Representatives from Nebraska's 2nd district
- In office January 3, 1989 – January 3, 1995
- Preceded by: Hal Daub
- Succeeded by: Jon Christensen

Member of the Nebraska Legislature from the 6th district
- In office January 3, 1979 – January 7, 1987
- Preceded by: Margaret Moylan
- Succeeded by: Brad Ashford

Personal details
- Born: Peter Jackson Hoagland; November 17, 1941 Omaha, Nebraska, U.S.
- Died: October 30, 2007 (aged 65) Washington, D.C., U.S.
- Party: Democratic
- Spouse: Barbara Erickson Hoagland
- Education: Stanford University; Yale Law School

Peter Jackson Hoagland (November 17, 1941 – October 30, 2007) was an American politician from the U.S. state of Nebraska. A member of the Democratic Party, Hoagland represented Nebraska's 2nd congressional district in the U.S. House of Representatives from 1989 to 1995. To date, he is the last Democrat to represent Nebraska in the House of Representatives for more than one term.

== Biography ==
Hoagland was born in Omaha, Nebraska, and graduated from Omaha Central High School and then Stanford University in 1963. He was a first lieutenant in the United States Army from 1963 to 1965 during the Vietnam War. He graduated from Yale Law School in 1968 and was admitted to the bar the same year. He set up practice in Washington, D.C., as a clerk to Judge Oliver Gasch of the United States District Court for the District of Columbia from 1969 to 1970.

He was a staff attorney at the District of Columbia public defender service from 1970 to 1973.

External videos
- Booknotes interview with Robert Cwiklik on House Rules, February 2, 1992, C-SPAN

=== Political career ===
Hoagland was elected to the Nebraska Legislature in 1978 and served until 1986 when he declined to seek re-election.

==== Congress ====
In 1988, when Hal Daub decided to run for the U.S. Senate, Hoagland ran for the open seat and was elected to serve in the 101st Congress. Hoagland's freshman term in the House was the subject of the book House Rules: A Freshman Congressman's Initiation to the Backslapping, Backpedaling, and Backstabbing Ways of Washington by journalist Robert Cwiklik. He was re-elected in 1990 and 1992. In 1994, he was defeated for re-election by Jon Christensen; his defeat was attributed to the Republican Revolution. No other Democrat would be elected to represent Nebraska in the U.S. House until Brad Ashford was elected in 2014.

Throughout his terms in Congress, Hoagland was a strong advocate for the environment. In 1990, The League of Conservation Voters released a National Environmental Scorecard ranking members of Congress on their environmental voting records. Peter Hoagland scored a perfect 100%.

== Other activities ==
He was a member of the Episcopal church and the American Bar Association. In 1977, he was elected to the Common Cause National Governing Board.

After leaving Congress in 1995, Hoagland lived in Washington, D.C., where he worked for a law firm.

== Illness and death ==
Hoagland suffered from Parkinson's disease for the last five years of his life. He died in Washington, D.C., on October 30, 2007, at age 65.

U.S. House of Representatives
Preceded by Hal Daub	Member of the U.S. House of Representatives from Nebraska's 2nd congressional district 1989–1995	Succeeded by Jon Christensen
