= H. E. Watson =

British chemist

H. E. Watson FRIC FIChemE
- Born: Herbert Edmeston Watson; 17 May 1886; Kew, UK
- Died: 24 September 1980 (aged 94); Woking, UK
- Education: University College London; University of Berlin; University of Geneva; Trinity College, Cambridge
- Known for: Chemistry
- Spouse: Kathleen Rowson
- Children: 2
- Scientific career
- Fields: Chemistry; Chemical Engineering
- Workplaces: University College London; Indian Institute of Science

Herbert Edmeston Watson (17 May 1886 - 24 September 1980) was Ramsay Memorial Professor of Chemical Engineering at University College London and the inventor of the low voltage neon glow lamp.

== Education ==
Watson attended Marlborough School. He completed a Bachelor of Science in chemistry at University College London in 1908 under the tutorship of Sir William Ramsay. In Watson's notes from Ramsay Intermediate Lectures in 1904-05 he said of Ramsay:

No mere notes however convey the fascination of the course or the method of its delivery; still less can they describe the innumerable experiments, ranging from the isolation of argon from the air, to the vocal effects of hydrogen when inhaled, which accompanied it. Practically every laboratory preparation described was carried out on the lecture bench, and a sample of every substance mentioned was to be seen. Any unusual properties were demonstrated.

While under Ramsay, Watson worked with him on "The refraction and dispersion of neon", while Ramsay presented Watson's work "The spectrum of the lighter constituents of the air" to the Royal Society in 1908, and "The spectrum of radium emanation" to the Royal Society in 1909. Also while at UCL, Watson modified Chick's Law, the relationship between the kill efficiency of organisms and contact time with a disinfectant, that had been created by Harriette Chick, by including the coefficient of specific lethality. The 1908 amendment is known as The Chick-Watson Equation.

Watson studied for his Doctor of Science at several institutions. In 1909 he studied at the University of Berlin under Walter Nernst. During 1910 he was at the University of Geneva under Philippe-Auguste Guye, completing his studies at the Trinity College, Cambridge under Joseph John Thomson in 1911. During this time he was awarded the 1851 Exhibition Scholarship. At Cambridge, he created the first low voltage neon glow lamp which worked at 180 V. Thomson presented the work of Watson and Francis William Aston to the Royal Academy in 1912, and Watson' s work on "Some experiments on the electrical discharge in helium and neon" to the Cambridge Philosophical Society. He graduated from his Doctor of Science at University College London in 1912.

== Career ==
In 1911 he joined the Indian Institute of Science in Bangalore as an associate professor, before progressing to the role of Professor of Inorganic and Physical Chemistry at the Institute in 1916. During 1916, Watson and J. J. Sudborough successfully extracted the first sample of sandalwood oil in India at the institute. He resigned from the role in 1933, after the new director of the Institute, Sir C. V. Raman, started to redirect funds from the chemistry department to physics.

In 1934 he became the third Ramsay professor of chemical engineering at University College London after the death of the previous incumbent W. E. Gibbs, and held the position until his retirement in 1951. At the end of the war, Watson fell out with Professor of Chemistry Ingold over the quality of delivery of chemistry to chemical engineering students, which was resolved by Watson hiring his own chemistry lecturer. Upon his retirement he was made Emeritus Professor at UCL, being replaced by M. B. Donald as the Ramsay professor. In 1961, he wrote the paper "The development of the neon glow lamp (1911–61)" which appeared in Nature.

== Personal life and death ==
Watson was born to Arthur Edmeston Watson and Helen Louisa Rumpff, in Kew on the 17 May 1886. He married Kathleen Margaret Rowson in 1917, who died in 1951, and had one son Bruce Edmeston Watson in 1918. Watson died on the 24 September 1980 in Woking.
