= Millane =

Millane is a surname. Notable people with this surname include:

- Darren Millane (1965–1991), Australian-rules football player
- Grace Millane (1996–2018), English tourist murdered in New Zealand
- Rick Millane, New Zealand engineer

== See also ==
- Millanes, Spanish municipality
