= Carol A. Mullen =

American academic researcher and scholar of alternative mentoring

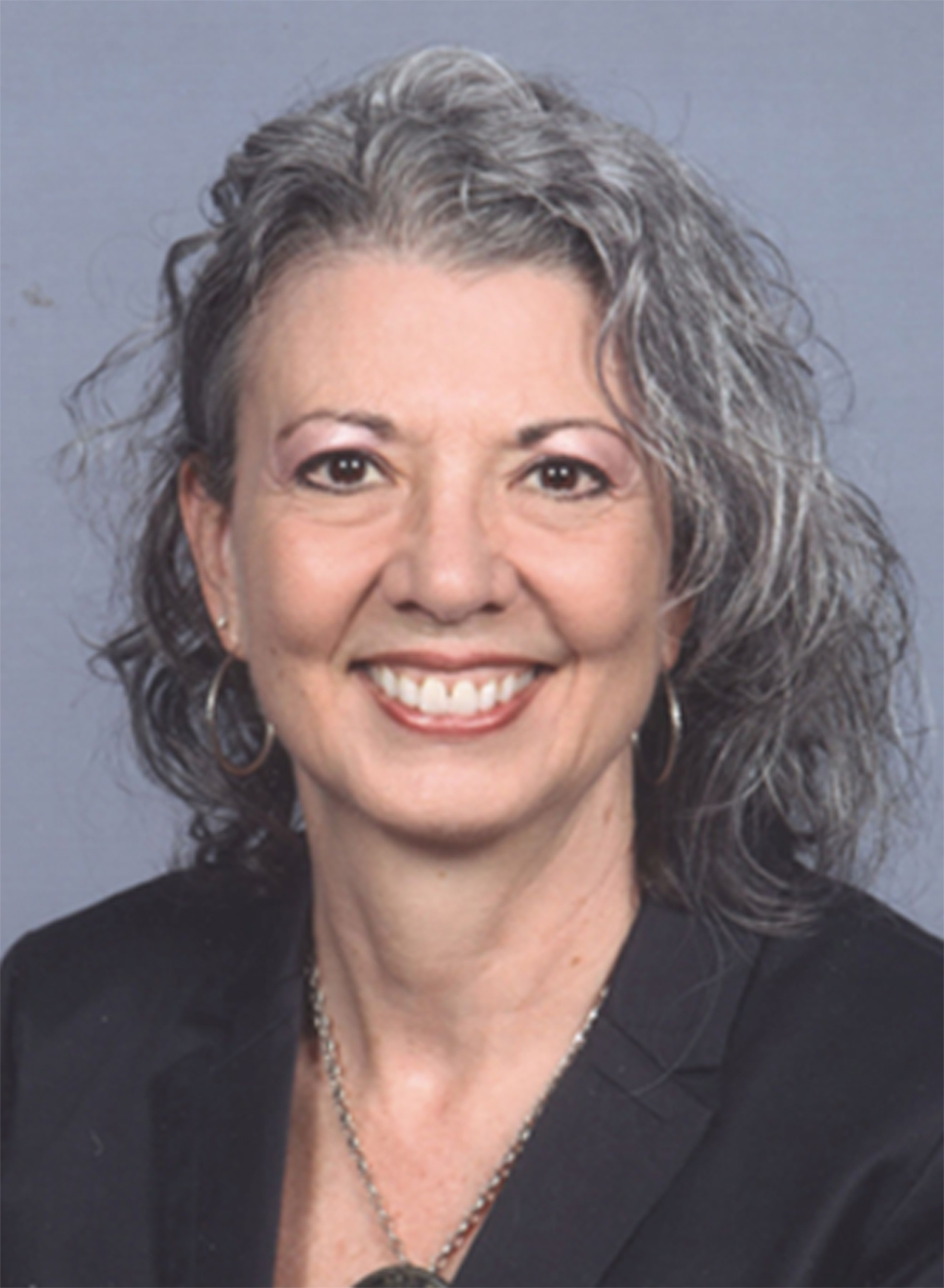
- Carol A Mullen in 2026
- Born: Halifax, Nova Scotia, Canada
- Education: York University (BA); University of Toronto (MA, PhD)
- Occupation: Professor of Educational Leadership
- Website: https://liberalarts.vt.edu/departments-and-schools/school-of-education/faculty/carol-a-mullen.html

Carol A. Mullen is a Canadian and American professor of educational leadership and policy studies in the College of Liberal Arts and Human Sciences at Virginia Tech in Blacksburg, Virginia, United States, where she served as director of the School of Education and an associate dean for the college. An interdisciplinary researcher who specializes in the subject of mentorship, she is editor emerita of the journal Mentoring & Tutoring: Partnership in Learning, having served as editor from 2002 to 2010. Subsequently, her research work examined the impact of creativity on high-stakes testing in different cultures through Fulbright-sponsored scholarships to China and Canada, with related study in Australia.

== Education ==
Mullen received a bachelor’s degree from York University. and a master’s degree and PhD from the University of Toronto.

== Academic career ==
In 2003, Mullen was promoted to associate professor with tenure at the University of South Florida, and then full professor in 2007 at the University of North Carolina at Greensboro, where she served as department chair.

Mullen is a leading scholar in the area of mentorship and among the originators of the concept "alternative mentoring", an overarching term that consolidates several non-dyadic forms of mentorship. These types include formal mentoring, informal mentoring, diverse mentoring, electronic mentoring, comentoring or collaborative mentoring, group mentoring, multilevel comentoring, peer mentoring, and cultural mentoring. In 1997, she founded and coordinated the Mentorship and Mentoring Practices Special Interest Group of the American Educational Research Association (AERA) and has developed other mentoring programs sponsored by organizations and universities. Breaking the Circle of One: Redefining Mentorship in the Lives and Writings of Educators (see further reading) received the 1998 AERA Research Award from Division K: Teaching & Teacher Education. Of her 30 published books, most of the early material deals with mentorship. Mentorship is similarly a theme in many of her 240 refereed and invited journal articles and book chapters, as well as 17 guest-edited special issues of journals. While these publications frequently deal with mentoring theory and practice in education, her body of work also addresses leadership, creativity, social justice, and equity.

Mullen received over 30 awards in leadership, research, and mentorship in the social sciences, specifically educational leadership and administration and related fields. The 2026 AERA Excellence in Research Award from Division A: Administration, Organization, and Leadership recognized her outstanding contributions to the field of leadership. Academic awards from the International Council of Professors of Educational Leadership (ICPEL), University Council for Educational Administration (UCEA), University of Toronto, and Virginia Tech honored her as a leader with distinguished leadership, superior mentoring and teaching, and outstanding service to leadership preparation. Her significant contributions to research have also been acknowledged with the 2020 Leaders and Legends Excellence Award from the University of Toronto and the 2019 Alumni Award for Research Excellence from Virginia Tech. For her accomplishments in international research, she was presented with the 2017 Living Legend Award from ICPEL and the 2021 Alumni Award for Excellence in International Research from Virginia Tech.

Mullen is past-president of UCEA, ICPEL and Society of Professors of Education. Currently, she serves as editorial board member for Interchange, International Journal of Mentoring & Coaching in Education, Mentoring & Tutoring: Partnership in Learning, Research in Educational Administration and Leadership, and Teacher Development.

== Selected works ==
=== Books ===
==== Mentorship ====
- Mullen, C. A. (2025). Equity in school mentoring and induction. Springer. ISBN 978-3-031-78744-7.
- Fletcher, S. J., & Mullen, C. A. (Eds.). (2012). The SAGE handbook of mentoring and coaching in education. Sage. ISBN 0857027530.
- Mullen, C. A. (Ed.). (2008). The handbook of formal mentoring in higher education: A case study approach. Christopher-Gordon Publishers. ISBN 978-1933760209.
- Mullen, C. A. (2005). The mentorship primer. Peter Lang. ISBN 9780820476308.
- Mullen, C. A., Cox, M. D., Boettcher, C. K., & Adoue, D. S. (Eds.). (2005). Breaking the circle of one: Redefining mentorship in the lives and writings of educators. Peter Lang. (2nd ed.; 1st ed. 1997). ISBN 978-0820437583.
- Mullen, C. A., & Lick, D. W. (Eds.). (1999). New directions in mentoring: Creating a culture of synergy. Routledge. ISBN 9780750710114.

==== Creativity ====
- Mullen, C. A. (2020). Canadian Indigenous literature and art: Decolonizing education, culture, and society. Brill. ISBN 978-90-04-42839-3.
- Mullen, C. A. (2020). Revealing creativity: Exploration in transnational education cultures. Springer. ISBN 3030481646.
- Mullen, C. A. (Ed.). (2019). Creativity under duress in education? Resistive theories, practices, and actions. Springer. ISBN 978-3319902715.

==== Leadership, learning, and policy ====
- Mullen, C. A., & Eadens, D. W. (Eds.). (2026). Improving your college courses: A guide for engaging in digital learning. Myers Education Press. ISBN 9781975509361
- Tienken, C. H., & Mullen, C. A. (Eds.). (2022). The risky business of education policy. Routledge. ISBN 9780367622466.
- Mullen, C. A. (Ed.). (2021). Handbook of social justice interventions in education. Springer. ISBN 978-3030358570.

=== Articles ===
- Mullen, C. A. (2026). Equity leadership in K–12 online communities under democratic duress. Education Sciences, 16(2), 257–275. doi:10.3390/educsci16020257
- Mullen, C. A., & Warnick, S. K. (2025). Community and equity in state-level virtual schools from a leadership perspective. American Journal of Distance Education, 39(4), 404–425. doi:10.1080/08923647.2024.2441532.
- Mullen, C. A. (2024). Creative learning and expression in college classrooms across different cultures. Journal of Creative Behavior, 59(2), 1–11. doi:10.1002/jocb.70013.
- Mullen, C. A. (2024). Weaponizing settler slogans to mandate colonial school policy in the Americas: Transformation through Indigenous futurity. Policy Futures in Education, 22(8), 1540–1553. doi:10.1177/14782103231199811
- Mullen, C. A., & Bartlett, T. C. (2024). Charter movement controversy: An American public charter school case study. Education Inquiry, 15(3), 367–384. doi:10.1080/20004508.2022.2112420
- Mullen, C. A., & Fleming, J. L. (2024). Pedagogical strategies in the cotaught K–12 inclusive setting: Role responsibility for teacher partners and leaders. Teacher Development: An International Journal of Teachers’ Professional Development, 29(1), 1–24. doi:10.1080/13664530.2024.2357769
- Mullen, C. A., & Nitowski, R. J. (2024). Dropout epidemic—who is (not) graduating high school: A 4-year analysis of predictive indicators. International Journal of Educational Reform, 33(4), 367–387. doi:10.1177/10567879241262754
- Bembenutty, H., Kitsantas, A., DiBenedetto, M. K., Wigfield, A., Greene, J. A., Usher, E. L., Bong, M., Cleary, T. J., Panadero, E., Mullen, C. A., & Chen, P. P. (2024). Harnessing motivation, self-efficacy, and self-regulation: Dale H. Schunk’s enduring influence. Educational Psychology Review, 36(139), 138–139. doi:10.1007/s10648-024-09969-9
- Cox, J. S., & Mullen, C. A. (2023). Impacting student achievement: Principals’ instructional leadership practice in two Title I rural schools. Journal of School Leadership, 33(1), 3–25. doi:10.1177/10526846221133996
- Mullen, C. A. (2023). Guiding online students in a crisis: An intervention for mentoring educational leadership doctoral candidates. Journal of Research on Leadership Education, 18(3), 510–533. doi:10.1177/19427751221097147
- Mullen, C. A., & Badger, S. C. (2023). Leadership support in a pandemic: Middle school teacher perceptions of emergency remote teaching. Research in Middle Level Education, 46(4), 1–15. doi:10.1080/19404476.2023.2184628
- Mullen, C. A., & Fallen, M. T. (2022). Navigating uncharted waters”: New teacher mentoring and induction. Research in Educational Administration and Leadership, 7(4), 751–785. doi:10.30828/real.1165667
- Mullen, C. A. (2022). I write as an uninvited guest on Indigenous land: Recentering allyship in education. Educational Studies, 58(4), 495–510. doi:10.1080/00131946.2022.2079090
- Mullen, C. A., & Hunt, T. K. (2022). Emotional disability and strategies for supporting student outcomes: Interviews with K–12 special education teachers. Teacher Development, 26(4), 453–471. doi:10.1080/13664530.2022.2108129
- Mullen, C. A., & Klimaitis, C. C. (2019). Defining mentoring: A literature review of issues, types, and applications. Annals of the New York Academy of Sciences, 1483(1), 19–35. doi:10.1111/nyas.14176
- Mullen, C. A. (2016). Alternative mentoring types. Kappa Delta Pi Record, 52(3), 132–136. doi:10.1080/00228958.2016.1191901
- Schunk, D. H., & Mullen, C. A. (2013). Toward a conceptual model of mentoring research: Integration with self-regulated learning. Educational Psychology Review, 25(3), 361–389. doi:10.1007/s10648-013-9233-3

=== Podcasts and webinars ===
- Mullen, C. A. (2026, September 24). How to create a mentoring network for research and publishing. Presentation in Paths to Publication Professional Series (virtual); sponsor: Texas A&M University-College Station, College of Education and Human Development, TX. https://youtu.be/wbizQupmIZI
- Mullen, C. A. (2026, June 17). Rethinking creativity for well being and leadership. Presentation in Lead Well Podcast (1:07 podcast); sponsor: University of British Columbia, CA. https://www.youtube.com/watch?v=0cB4R2LfU7s
- Mullen, C. A. (2024, March, featured speaker). Coaching and mentoring in higher education. Webinar and paper presented online/live; US representative on international panel of content experts. Emerald (UK) and the International Higher Education Teaching and Learning Association (USA). https://www.youtube.com/watch?v=ms5fw1DJ8Ro
