= Mullins =

Mullins may refer to:

- Mullins, South Carolina, USA; a city
- Mullins River, Belize; a river
- Mullins (surname), people with the surname Mullins
- AMD Mullins, a series of Accelerated Processing Units (APUs) by AMD

== See also ==
- Mullins River, Belize; a village
- Mullins Center, Amherst, an arena
- Mullins effect, a feature of rubber's mechanical behavior
- Mullen (disambiguation)
- Mullens (disambiguation)
- Mullin (surname)
