= Mullin =

Mullin is a surname of Irish origin. Notable people with the name include:

== Arts, entertainment and media ==
- John Mullin (journalist) (born 1964), British newspaper editor
- Mike Mullin (author), young adult fiction writer
- Willard Mullin (1902–1978), American sports cartoonist

== Military ==
- George Mullin (VC) (1892–1963), American recipient of the Victoria Cross during World War I
- Hugh P. Mullin (1878–1948), Philippine–American War Medal of Honor recipient

== Politics ==
- Annie Mullin (1847–1921) – Welsh suffragist, social worker and Liberal councillor
- Chris Mullin (politician) (born 1947), British Labour Party Member of Parliament
- Gene Mullin (1927–2021), American politician
- Gerald T. Mullin (1900–1982), American businessman, lawyer, and politician
- Joseph Mullin (1811–1882), New York lawyer and politician
- Markwayne Mullin (born 1977), U.S. Senator for Oklahoma; designated American secretary of homeland security
- Michael P. Mullin (born 1981), Virginia politician
- Washington Beltrán Mullin (1914–2003), Uruguayan lawyer and politician, president of the National Council of Government 1965-1966

== Science and technology ==
- Jack Mullin (1913–1999), American pioneer of magnetic tape sound recording
- John W. Mullin (1925–2009), British chemical engineer, known for crystallisation

== Sports ==
- Brendan Mullin (born 1963), Irish rugby union player
- Chris Mullin (born 1963), American basketball player
- Emma Mullin (born 1985), Irish ladies' Gaelic footballer and association footballer
- George Mullin (baseball) (1880–1944), baseball pitcher
- John Mullin (footballer) (born 1975), English association footballer, mostly played for Burnley, Rotherham and Tranmere Rovers
- Mike Mullin (bowler), American ten-pin bowler
- Oisín Mullin (born 2000), Irish Gaelic footballer and Australian rules footballer
- Paul Mullin (footballer, born 1974), English footballer, mostly played for Accrington Stanley and Morecambe
- Paul Mullin (born 1994), English footballer, has mostly played for Morecambe and Wrexham

== Other ==
- Glenn H. Mullin (born 1949), Tibetologist and author
- Herbert Mullin (1947–2022), American serial killer
- Jack Mullin (1913–1999), American engineer
- Mabel D. Mullin (1882–?), social club president in Washington D.C.

== See also ==
- Mullen, a surname
- Mullins (surname)
- Mullen (disambiguation)
- Mullens (disambiguation)
- Mullins (disambiguation)
