= Mike Mullin =

Mike Mullin may refer to:

- Mike Mullin (bowler), American ten-pin bowler
- Michael P. Mullin (born 1981), Virginia politician
- Mike Mullin (author), young adult fiction writer

== See also ==
- Michael Mullen (disambiguation)
