= Mullane =

Mullane is a surname. Notable people with the surname include

- Christopher Mullane, New Zealand army officer
- Dan Mullane, Irish celebrity chef and television personality
- David Mullane, rugby player
- Greg Mullane, Australian rugby player
- John Mullane (born 1981), Irish hurler player
- Jye Mullane (born 1981), Australian rugby player
- Margaret Mullane, British politician
- Mike Mullane (born 1945), USAF officer and astronaut
- Patrick Mullane VC (1858–1919), recipient of the Victoria Cross
- Tony Mullane (1859–1944), Irish baseball player

== See also ==
- Mullane v. Central Hanover Bank
- Mullaney
