= Michael Mullen (novelist) =

Irish novelist, children's author and historian

Michael Mullen (5 December 1937 in Castlebar-17 Feb 2024) was an Irish novelist, children's and adult fiction author and historian based in Mayo. He has published titles including "Hungry Land", "House of Mirrors" and "The Golden Key". He was the recipient of the Wild Atlantic Words first Appreciation Award. He was married to Deirdre.

== Publications ==
- The Road Taken: A Guide to the Roads and Scenery of Mayo (1 March 2008)
- Mayo: The Waters and the Wild by Michael Mullen and John P. McHugh (15 November 2004)
- To Hell or Connaught (24 February 1994)
- The Hungry Land (25 February 1993)
- The Viking Princess (December 1990)
- Festival of Fools (1984)
- Kelly: A Novel (December 1981)

Children's Books

- The Four Masters (1992)
- Flight of the Earls (1991)
- Magus the Lollypop Man (1984)
