= University Council for Educational Administration =

Institutional membership organization

The University Council for Educational Administration (UCEA) is the largest U.S. based research-oriented, institutional-only member consortium of higher education institutions dedicated to improving the profession of educational administration and leadership. Admission to full membership requires institutions to undergo rigorous institutional and program review. The organization was founded at Columbia University in the City of New York in 1954 by a group of fifteen universities concerned about the advancing the quality of educational leadership professionals and the state of the field. Today, membership includes over 110 member schools, mostly from the United States, but also universities in Australia and Hong Kong. Many of the public universities in the Association of American Universities are also members of the UCEA. The organization is also notable for publishing the Educational Administrative Quarterly, one of the leading research journals dedicated to educational administration.
