= David Mullins =

David or Dave Mullins may refer to:

- David Wiley Mullins (1906–1987), American academic
- David W. Mullins Jr. (1946–2018), American economist, former Federal Reserve Vice Chairman
- David Mullins (jockey) (born 1996), National Hunt jockey
- Dave Mullins (freediver), New Zealand freediver
- Dave Mullins (animator), American animator
