= E. C. Williams =

British chemical engineer

- Born: Evan Clifford Williams; 1892; England
- Died: 1973 (aged 80–81)
- Known for: Chemical Engineering
- Scientific career
- Fields: Chemistry; Chemical Engineering
- Institutions: University of Manchester; British Dyestuffs Corporation; University of Leeds; National Benzol Board; University College London; Shell; General Mills; General Dyestuffs Corporation

Evan Clifford Williams (1892–1973) was the first Ramsay Memorial Professor of Chemical Engineering at University College London, as well as the first in the United Kingdom being appointed in 1923.

== Career ==
Williams previously worked for the University of Manchester, British Dyestuffs Corporation, as a research chemist to the joint committee of the University of Leeds and the National Benzol Board, before he was appointed as the first Ramsay professor of chemical engineering at University College London in 1923.

While at University College London, Williams stated that the due to the development of chemical plant,

"chemical expertise was becoming even more important for the engineers building the plant than for the industrial chemist's who used it, hence the fusion of the sciences".

Williams handed in his resignation in 1927 before being replaced by W.E. Gibbs in 1928. Prior to his departure from University College London, he had engaged with British chemical companies and convinced them to make donations which allowed for the chemical engineering department to be increased in size.

After leaving University College London, he became vice president in Charge of Research for Shell at their research laboratory in Berkeley, California. While at Shell, he reported to the United States National Resources board in 1940.

After leaving Shell, Williams worked as head of research at General Mills, became a director of Standard Oil Company, before being technical director at General Dyestuffs Corporation.

== Awards ==
Williams was given the seventh William H. Walker Award by the American Institute of Chemical Engineers in 1942 for his work on the production of synthetic glycerol, which he had reported in the 1939 Transactions of the institute.

== Selected writing ==
- Modern Petroleum Research, Industrial and Chemical Engineering, News edition, Washington D.C., 10 December 1938, vol. 16 pg. 630-632
- Olefins from saturated paraffins or iso-paraffins by means of alumina catalyst with a chromic acid promotar, National Petroleum News, Cleveland, 19 April 1939, vol. 31 no. 17 pg. 184-66
- The Executive and the Technologist, News Edition, American Chemical Society 1940, 18, 5, 191–194 (News), Publication Date (Print):10 March 1940, doi:10.1021/cen-v018n005.p191
- On the mechanism of boundary lubrication. II. Wear prevention by addition agents, with Otto Beeck and JW Givens, Proceedings of the Royal Society of London. Series A. Mathematical and Physical Sciences, Volume 177, Issue 968, Pages 103–118, The Royal Society
- Operational Research, Nature 169, 556–557 (1952). Issued 5 April 1952, doi:10.1038/169556a0
