= Alex Mullen =

Alex Mullen may refer to:

- Alex Mullen (soccer)
- Alex Mullen (memory athlete)
- Alex Mullen (academic)
