= Ernest Baldwin =

British biochemist

- Born: Ernest Hubert Francis Baldwin; 29 March 1909
- Died: 7 December 1969 (aged 60)
- Education: St. John's College, Cambridge
- Known for: Biochemistry
- Spouse: Pauline Mary Edwards
- Children: 2
- Awards: 1851 Exhibition scholarship European Cortina-Ulisse Prize
- Scientific career
- Fields: Chemistry; Biochemistry
- Workplaces: St. John's College, Cambridge; Marine Biological Laboratory; University College London; Scripps Institution of Oceanography; University of Kansas

Ernest Hubert Francis Baldwin (29 March 1909 – 7 December 1969) was an English biochemist, textbook author and pioneer in the field of comparative biochemistry.

Born in Gloucester, Baldwin attended the Crypt Grammar School followed by St. John's College, Cambridge. He completed the natural sciences tripos, specialising in biochemistry for Part II. He won a 1851 Exhibition scholarship for 1933–1935, remaining at Cambridge to study biochemistry. His main influence there was the eminent biochemist Frederick Gowland Hopkins; he also worked with Joseph Needham and Dorothy Needham.

== Career ==
While at St. John's College and inspired by the broad biochemical interests of Hopkins and the Needhams, in 1937 Baldwin published An Introduction to Comparative Biochemistry, an influential introductory textbook that went through four editions, the last in 1964. During the Second World War Baldwin worked as an Air Warden. By 1946 Baldwin had advanced to the position of lecturer in biochemistry at Cambridge. In 1947, he published the first edition (of five) of Dynamic Aspects of Biochemistry, a widely used (and translated) textbook that won the 1952 European Cortina-Ulisse Prize. Baldwin's research at St. John's from 1940 to 1949 focused on the roundworm Ascaris lumbricoides. He also spent the summer of 1948 at the Marine Biological Laboratory, studying phosphagen in invertebrates. In 1949, Baldwin was Joint Honorary Secretary and member of the Congress and Executive Committees, active in the organisation of the First International Congress of Biochemistry, in Cambridge.

In 1950, Baldwin moved to University College, London, as chair of biochemistry. In addition to developing a biochemistry curriculum and managing new laboratory facilities, Baldwin's main areas of research at University College were comparative biochemistry, particularly in relation to nitrogen metabolism and ureotelic metabolism. With M. B. Donald, Ramsay professor of Chemical engineering, Baldwin set up a joint diploma, later a master's programme in biochemical engineering at UCL. His work was well regarded, especially abroad, and he held visiting professorships at the Scripps Institution of Oceanography and the University of Kansas.

Baldwin alumni include Frederick Sanger.

== Personal life and death ==
Ernest Baldwin was born in Gloucester to Hubert Charles Baldwin, organist and music teacher, and Nellie Victoria Baldwin (née Hailes). In 1933 he married Pauline Mary Edwards, and they had two children, Nicola and Nigel St. John. Baldwin died of congestive heart failure in 1969 after a prolonged struggle with myotonic muscular dystrophy.

== List of works ==
- Baldwin, Ernest; Moyle Needham, Dorothy (April 1937). "A contribution to the comparative biochemistry of muscular and electrical tissues". Proceedings of the Royal Society of London. Series B, Biological Sciences. 122 (827): 197–219. Bibcode:1937RSPSB.122..197B. doi:10.1098/rspb.1937.0021.
- An Introduction to Comparative Biochemistry (1937). Second edition, 1940; third edition 1948; fourth edition, 1964.
- Dynamic Aspects of Biochemistry (1947).
- The Nature of Biochemistry (1947) ISBN 978-0521091770.

== Collections ==
Baldwin's papers and correspondence are held at University College London. They were transferred to the University in 1997, having previously been held by the University of Bath.
