= Rick Millane =

New Zealand engineer

Rick P. Millane is a New Zealand electrical and computer engineer currently Professor at University of Canterbury and an Elected Fellow of The Royal Society of New Zealand. A cited expert in his field, his research involves structural biology, molecular imaging and computational imaging.

== Education ==
He earned his bachelor's degree and Ph.D. at University of Canterbury.

== Recent publications ==
- Millane RP. (2017) The phase problem for one-dimensional crystals. Acta Crystallographica Section A: Foundations and Advances 73(2): 140-150
- Millane RP., Zhang N., Enevoldson E. and Murray JE. (2017) Analysis of mountain wave 3D wind fields in the Andes derived from high-altitude sailplane flights. Technical Soaring in press
- Popp D., Loh ND., Zorgati H., Ghoshdastider U., Liow LT., Ivanova MI., Larsson M., Deponte DP., Bean R. and Beyerlein KR. (2017) Flow-aligned, single-shot fiber diffraction using a femtosecond X-ray free-electron laser. Cytoskeleton
- Wojtas DH., Ayyer K., Liang M., Mossou E., Romoli F., Seuring C., Beyerlein KR., Bean RJ., Morgan AJ. and Oberthuer D. (2017) Analysis of XFEL serial diffraction data from individual crystalline fibrils. IUCrJ 4: 795-811
- R. P. Millane, M. E. Fitzsimons, M. Qi and A. Haider (2006) Analysis of Gravel River Beds using Three-Dimensional Laser Scanning. SPIE Proceedings Vol. 6316
