= Margaret Moylan =

American politician (1907/1908–1993)

Member of the Nebraska Legislature from the 6th district
- In office November 22, 1978 – January 3, 1979
- Preceded by: Harold Moylan
- Succeeded by: Peter Hoagland

Personal details
- Born: 1906 or 1907 Greeley, Kansas
- Died: January 8, 1993 (aged 86) Omaha, Nebraska
- Party: Democratic
- Spouse: Harold Moylan (m. 1929; died 1978)
- Children: 4 (James, Joseph, Patrick, Mary Jean)

Margaret Moylan (née Emery, 1907 or 1908 – January 8, 1993) was a Democratic politician from Nebraska who briefly served as a member of the Nebraska Legislature from the 6th district from November 1978 to January 1979, completing the term of her late husband Harold Moylan.

Margaret Emery was born in Greeley, Nebraska, and graduated from St. John's High School in Omaha. She married Harold Moylan in 1929, and they moved to Bayard, Iowa, where they farmed until retiring in 1959, when they returned to Omaha.

In 1964, Harold Moylan was elected to the Nebraska Legislature. Margaret was a member of the Unicameral Ladies Club, a group of the wives of state legislators, and was elected president of the club in 1967. She routinely visited the legislature, and was politically active in the Nebraska Democratic Party, serving on the Seniors Advisory Council to Democratic Congressman John Cavanaugh during his 1976 re-election campaign.

Harold declined to seek another term in 1978, but on November 18, 1978, before his term ended, he died. Governor J. James Exon appointed Margaret to serve out the remaining month of his term, and she was sworn in on November 22, 1978. However, because the legislature was out of session and did not come back into special session, she never cast a vote or attended a session as a legislator.

Moylan died on January 8, 1993.
