= Harold Moylan =

American politician (1903–1978)

Member of the Nebraska Legislature from the 6th district
- In office January 5, 1965 – November 18, 1978
- Preceded by: Sam Klaver (redistricted)
- Succeeded by: Margaret Moylan

Personal details
- Born: March 5, 1903 Bayard, Iowa
- Died: November 18, 1978 (aged 75) Omaha, Nebraska
- Party: Democratic
- Spouse: Margaret Emery (m. 1929)
- Children: 5 (James, Joseph, Mary Jean, Patrick, Ann)
- Occupation: Farmer, real estate broker

Harold Moylan (March 5, 1903 – November 18, 1978) was a Democratic politician from Nebraska who served as a member of the Nebraska Legislature from the 6th district from 1965 until his death in 1978.

== Early life ==
Moylan was born in Bayard, Iowa, in 1903. He attended Creighton University in 1928 with his bachelor's degree, and returned to Bayard, where he managed a farm until 1959. After retiring from farming, he moved to Omaha, where he worked as a real estate broker.

== Nebraska Legislature ==
In 1964, following redistricting, Moylan ran for the state legislature from the 6th district. He faced a crowded primary, and ran against retired fire captain Salvatore Turco, engineer Wallace Rankin, printer Frank Riha, salesman Harold Kelly, accountant Harry Roach, and former Omaha City Commissioner Arthur Hanson. In the primary election, Moylan narrowly placed first, winning 29 percent of the vote to Rankin's 27 percent, and they advanced to the general election. Moylan defeated Rankin by a wide margin, winning 58 percent of the vote to his 42 percent.

Moylan ran for re-election to a four-year term in 1966. He was challenged by accounting clerk Gerald Mathews, fireman James Daniel McKernan, and conservative activist George Thomas. Moylan placed first in the primary by a wide margin, winning 64 percent of the vote. He advanced to the general election with Thomas, who received 17 percent of the vote, and defeated him in a landslide, winning re-election 72–28 percent.

In 1970, Moylan sought a third term, and was opposed by attorney Howard Kaiman. Moylan placed first over Kaiman in the primary, receiving 73 percent of the vote to his 27 percent, and handily won the general election with 71 percent of the vote.

Moylan ran for a fourth term in 1974. He was challenged by Kaiman, in a rematch of their 1966 race, as well as businessman Richard Giblin and real estate investor George Kelly. Moylan won 51 percent of the vote in the primary election, and proceeded to the general election with Giblin, who placed second and won 25 percent of the vote. Moylan defeated Giblin in the general election, winning his fourth term with 59 percent of the vote.

In 1978, Moylan declined to seek re-election to a fifth term.

== Death ==
Moylan died on November 18, 1978, several weeks prior to the end of his term in the legislature. Following his death, Governor J. James Exon appointed his widow, Margaret, to serve out the remaining month of his term.
