= John Mullins =

John or Johnny Mullins may refer to:

- Johnny Mullins (born 1985), English footballer
- John Lane Mullins (1857–1939), Australian politician
- John Mullins (priest) (died 1591), English churchman and Marian exile
- Johnny Mullins (songwriter) (1923–2009), American country songwriter
- John F. Mullins (born 1942), American ex-soldier, author, business owner, and game consultant
  - John Mullins, a player character in Soldier of Fortune and Soldier of Fortune II: Double Helix based on him

== See also ==
- John Mullin (disambiguation)
