= Gerry Mullan =

Gerry Mullan may refer to:

- Gerry Mullan (footballer), footballer from Northern Ireland
- Gerry Mullan (politician), Northern Ireland politician
