= D.R. Mullins =

American painter (born 1958)

- Born: 18 April 1958; Alexandria, Virginia

D.R. Mullins (born April 18, 1958) is a multidimensional visual artist from the Appalachian region of Southwest Virginia. He is a portraitist, muralist, sculptor, theatrical set designer, interior designer, and freelance painter. Mullins' artwork often depicts Appalachian culture and Buddhist philosophy. Throughout his career, Mullins' art has fluctuated in style and medium multiple times.

Mullins resides in Shady Valley, Tennessee.

== Early life and education ==
D.R. Mullins was born in Alexandria, Virginia. Soon afterwards his family moved to the small town of Clintwood, Virginia. After graduating from high school, Mullins was accepted on a full football scholarship to the University of North Carolina at Chapel Hill. A knee injury put a halt to Mullins' athletic activities, but allowed him more time to pursue art. Although he never completed his B.F.A., he learned the basic fundamentals of art at UNC.

== Career ==
As a freelance artist, Mullins has worked many different jobs throughout his lifetime, all of which have had strong artistic influence.

=== Theatrical design ===
Mullins is married to Robin Mullins, a native of Wise, Virginia and fellow artist, musician, and actor. Together they moved to Lexington, Virginia where they both worked at the outdoor Theatre at Lime Kiln, where Mullins worked on set design and was commissioned to construct papier-mâché puppet heads that would be worn by eight-to-14-foot tall, stilt-walking actors.
Mullins worked for many years at the historic state theatre of Virginia, Barter Theatre, where he served as head scenic artist.

=== Murals ===
Mullins is often best known for his murals displayed throughout Virginia. Mullins' commissions include murals for the Virginia Gas Co., the Southwest Virginia Higher Education Center in Abingdon, the Virginia Highlands Community College, the Bristol (Virginia) Public Library, and Abingdon, Virginia's new cultural/art center, Heartwood.

"Appalachian Identity" at the Virginia Highlands Community College
"Going Places" at Bristol (Virginia) Public Library

== Exhibitions ==
Mullins has shown his artwork in many spaces throughout the years with exhibitions in Philadelphia's Indigo Arts Gallery, the "8" gallery in Southport, NC, Kamen Gallery at Washington and Lee University, and William King Museum where Mullins shared in a three-man show entitled Pillars of Bohemia.
