= Mullens =

Mullens may refer to:

- Mullens, West Virginia, USA
- B. J. Mullens (b. 1989), American basketball player
- Bob Mullens (1922–1989), American basketball player
- Nick Mullens (b. 1995), American football player
- Willy Mullens (1880–1952), an early Dutch producer, director, and promoter of movies

== See also ==
- Mullins (disambiguation)
- Mullen (disambiguation)
- Mullins (disambiguation)
- Mullin (surname)
