= Florida Four =

Failed PIRA arms smuggling attempt

The Florida Four were a group of weapon traffickers — Anthony Smyth, Conor Claxton, Martin Mullan and Siobhan Browne — who delivered weapons from the United States to the Republic of Ireland for eventual use in Northern Ireland by the Provisional Irish Republican Army.

The operation was first uncovered in 1999 and the group were convicted in 2000

The group was able to send about a 100 handguns, rifles and shotguns, as well as armour-piercing ammunition. The weapons were mailed from Fort Lauderdale in packages containing toys and electronics.

Browne later said that Claxton "spent more than US$100,000 off the books on semi- and fully automatic weapons".

In August 1999, the IRA, through the Irish republican newspaper An Phoblacht, denied sanctioning the plot. This contradicts Conor Claxton's testimony that he was sent to Florida by a senior IRA official and that they needed higher approval to complete the arms mission.
