= William Edward Gibbs =

British academic and chemical engineer

William Edward Gibbs (1890 – 18 January 1934) was the second Ramsay Memorial Professor of Chemical Engineering at University College London. He was the second head of the department replacing the first, E. C. Williams.

== Career ==
Gibbs completed his graduation at the University of Liverpool taking his first post with the Straits Trading Company in Singapore as an Assistant Chemist. He returned to the University of Liverpool as a lecturer in Metallurgy, where he researched the issue of the recovery of tin from the waste material by using electro chemical recovery. He was also made an investigator with the Corrosion Committee at the Institute of Metals.

During the First World War, Gibbs held the post of chief examiner of the Aeronautical Inspection Department, before becoming the chief chemist at the Royal Navy's rolling mill at Weston, Southampton. At the end of the war, he was appointed the chief chemist at the Salt Union, where he gained great experience in the methods and problems of evaporation and crystallisation.

In 1924, Gibbs gave the general name aerosol to the dispers systems in air. See in this context Clouds and Smokes, page 8.

In 1928, Gibbs was appointed as the successor to E. C. Williams, as Ramsay professor for chemical engineering at University College, London. Due to his predecessor's fund raising activities with British chemical companies, the university was planning a large expansion of the department, which Gibbs designed and carried out, concluding with the opening of the new Ramsey Laboratory in 1932. In 1930, Gibbs was an expert witness in the case of United Lamp Black Works vs. Greenwich Borough Council.

== Death ==
In January 1934, Gibbs died suddenly at the age of 44. He was replaced as the Ramsay professor by H. E. Watson.

== Publications ==
- Gibbs, William E. (1924): Clouds and Smokes. The properties of disperse systems in gases and their practical applications.
