= John W. Mullin =

British chemical engineering

John W. Mullin FRSc FIChemE FREng
- Born: John William Mullin; 22 August 1925
- Died: 11 March 2009 (aged 83)
- Education: University of Wales, University College London
- Known for: Chemistry; Chemical Engineering
- Spouse: Averil Mullin
- Children: 2
- Scientific career
- Fields: Chemistry; Chemical Engineering
- Workplaces: University College London

John William Mullin (22 August 1925 – 11 March 2009) was a Ramsay Memorial Professor of Chemical Engineering and world expert in crystallisation.

== Education and career ==
Between 1945 and 1948 Mullin was with the RAF. After leaving the RAF, he studied at the University of Wales and gained a first class degree in chemistry in 1951. Mullin's joined the University College London, where he completed a postgraduate diploma in chemical engineering in 1952, and then a PhD in 1955. He achieved a DSc from the University of Wales in 1962.

In 1956, he joined the Ramsay department of chemical engineering at University College London, first as a lecturer, and from 1961 as a reader, before becoming a professor in 1969. While under M. B. Donald, the Ramsay professor of chemical engineering, Mullin's built a strong research group in the field of crystallisation. His textbook Crystallization was first published in 1961. Due to his expertise into cystallisation he was in demand as a consultant in the chemical, petrochemical, food and pharmaceutical industries.

In 1985, he was appointed the Ramsay professor of chemical engineering, replacing the previous incumbent P. N. Rowe. He retired from the role in 1990, being replaced by A. Cornish. He continued as Professor Emeritus and in 1997 was UCL Crabtree Foundation president.

Upon Mullin's death, Professor Richard Allsop wrote for the Royal Academy of Engineering,

"As well as being eminent in his field, John Mullin was a valued senior colleague to many of us at UCL across and probably well beyond the Faculty of Engineering. He lived and thrived, and helped us to live and thrive, through times of immense change in academic life by his leadership in the senior roles he played, and by real personal concern for many with whom he worked. In retirement we continued to see him often, and we shall continue to feel his presence in spirit."

== Awards ==
In 1970, Mullin was jointly awarded the IChemE Moulton Medal with J Nyvlt for the most meritorious paper published by the Institution.

Mullin was elected as Fellow of the Royal Society of Chemistry; the Institution of Chemical Engineers and the Royal Academy of Engineering. He was also an honorary Fellow of the School of Pharmacy; University College Wales and University College London.

== Early and personal life ==
Mullin was born in Cheshire on 22 August 1925, attending the Hawarden High School until 1940. He met his wife Averil while at the University of Wales, and they would go onto have two children, Jonathan and Susan, and grandchildren Victoria and Katherine. Mullin died on 11 March 2009 at home aged 83.

== Selected works ==
- Crystallization, 1961, 1973, 1993, 2001
- Mullin, J. W.; Raven, K. D. (1961). "Nucleation in Agitated Solutions". Nature. 190 (4772): 251. Bibcode:1961Natur.190..251M. doi:10.1038/190251a0.
- Mullin, J. W.; Garside, J.; Unahabhokha, R. (2007). "Diffusivities of ammonium and potassium alums in aqueous solutions". Journal of Applied Chemistry. 15 (11): 502–505. doi:10.1002/jctb.5010151103.
- Mullin, J. W.; Leci, C. L. (1969). "Evidence of molecular cluster formation in supersaturated solutions of citric acid". Philosophical Magazine. 19 (161): 1075–1077. Bibcode:1969PMag...19.1075M. doi:10.1080/14786436908225872.
- Mullin, John W.; Gaska, Czeslaw (1973). "Potassium sulfate crystal growth rates in aqueous solution". Journal of Chemical & Engineering Data. 18 (2): 217–220. doi:10.1021/je60057a030.
- Jones, A. G.; Mullin, J. W. (1973). "Crystallisation kinetics of potassium sulphate in a draft-tube agitated vessel". Transactions of the Institution of Chemical Engineers. 51: 302–308. OCLC 1606163.
- Mullin, J. W.; Ang, H-M. (1976). "Nucleation characteristics of aqueous nickel ammonium sulphate solutions". Faraday Discussions of the Chemical Society. 61: 141. doi:10.1039/DC9766100141.
- Jones, A.G.; Budz, J.; Mullin, J.W. (1987). "Batch crystallization and solid-liquid separation of potassium sulphate". Chemical Engineering Science. 42 (4): 619–629. Bibcode:1987ChEnS..42..619J. doi:10.1016/0009-2509(87)80023-4.
- Jones, A.G.; Budz, J.; Mullin, J.W. (1987). "Batch crystallization and solid-liquid separation of potassium sulphate". Chemical Engineering Science. 42 (4): 619–629. Bibcode:1987ChEnS..42..619J. doi:10.1016/0009-2509(87)80023-4.
