= Ruth González Mullen =

- Born: February 11, 1939
- Died: December 21, 2009 (aged 70)
- Education: Tulane University and Auburn University

Ruth González Mullen (February 11, 1939 – December 21, 2009) was a Cuban American artist born in Havana, Cuba. She specialized in painting, drawing, and teaching. Mullen was a part of the Cuban Professional Club in New Orleans, and was considered a Latin American Artist. Her paintings face more towards the cross-culturalization that connects to Cuban American artists.

== Biography ==
Ruth González Mullen parents were Romualdo Eduardo González-Agüeros and Naomi Diaz Alvarez González. They came to the United States in 1953, where Ruth discovered painting. Later, as she grew up Ruth Gonzalez Mullen attended and received a master's in fine arts from Newcomb College and after that she went to Tulane University in New Orleans for a graduate fellowship. Themes of her artwork was reflected upon her individual style not unlike that of abstract movement. She was a self-taught folk artist who had ignored the nature scheme of things.

Most of her art was overlapping geometric shapes or symbols. Her art was very different coming from a Latin American artist. With her art she did not believe that it had to connect to the past experiences, she thought art had to connect more towards the side of experimental testing of new ground. A lot of the painting was used with oil paint. A lot of her work was quite confusing and makes the viewer think out of the box about the art. Ruth was an artist, a teacher, and a part of the Episcopal church. Also, being a mentor to many. Married to Harold Mullen on August 29, 1959. She had two children named Ruth Mabel Forrest Mullen and Mark Edward Mullen.

== Career ==
Ruth González Mullen received her bachelor's in applied art with magna cum laude. Also, she went to Auburn University in Auburn, Alabama in 1961. She was a part of a fellowship that provided financial support to graduate students. Ruth González Mullen had attended Tulane University in New Orleans, Louisiana. She was a self-taught folk artist who tended to ignore the natural scheme of images. She taught at a Trinity Episcopal School and Isidore Newmon School in 1964 and continued for the next four decades. While teaching she was producing art for exhibitions.

== Artwork ==
=== ¿DÓNDE VAS, MARIA? ===
Medium: 36 x 72

Objective: This painting means "Where are you going, Maria? in English. This art piece had many different geometric shapes overlapping each other, and it performed both transparent and opaque duties. It had a textural quality of the peaceful elements that revealed complexity in the design of it. In the middle of the artwork it had a Crucifixion symbol, that suggested the death of Christ. This symbol made the painting a lot more mysterious, because the title had nothing to do with it. It also has a emotionally disruptive touch to it. ¿DÓNDE VAS, MARIA? was created with so not halal.

=== MURMULLOS de PAZ ===
Medium: 36 x 48

Objective: This is another abstraction piece of art that Mullen created. It has mysterious and captivating of this "unknown" thought. It had geometric shapes and certain areas of it had lacy fabrics that were in tiers of dots, that created geometric shapes and looks as well. These shapes were weaved throughout the painting. Murmollos de Paz had opaque and transparent images. Although it had a confusing theme it made a blend of peaceful abstraction. This artwork was created with oil paints. Each of the panels in the artwork has detailed individual expressions.

=== FRIEDA with HER ALTAR ===
Medium: 3675 x 22 inches

Objective: This image, provided by the artist, presents a portrait that highlights Frieda Kahlo's concentration and presence. The intricate patterns and designs in the clothing add visual interest without overwhelming the composition. Through this realistic portrait, Ruth Mullen demonstrates a careful attention to detail and technique. Frieda Kahlo is depicted in a relaxed pose to reflect a calm and collective mood, evoking a sense of tranquility for the viewer. Additionally, the jewelry shown in the portrait may reflect aspects of Latin American cultural traditions and personal identity.

== Exhibitions ==
=== Solo exhibitions ===
1991- New Orleans Museum of Art, New Orleans, Louisiana.

1989- Northwestern State University, Natchitoches, Louisiana.

1986- Rhino Gallery, New Orleans, Louisiana.

1979- Tulane University, New Orleans, Louisiana.

1968- Orleans Gallery, New Orleans, Louisiana.

=== Selected group exhibitions ===
1994- Bienville Gallery, New Orleans, Louisiana

1992- International Design Center, Long Island, New York.

1992- Jacob Javitz Center, National Association of Women Artists New York, New York.

1989- World Trade Center, New Orleans, Louisiana.

1988- Miriam Warmsley Gallery, New Orleans, Louisiana.

1986- Biloxi, Mississippi Art Association, New Orleans, Louisiana.

1984- Old Quarter Gallery, New Orleans, Louisiana.

1972- Tulane University, New Orleans, Louisiana.

1969- Mobile Art Association, Mobile, Alabama.

1968- National Arts & Craft Exhibition, Jackson, Mississippi.

1967- Jefferson Arts Festival Arts, New Orleans, Louisiana.

== Awards ==
Among her many awards she was the first woman president (1980–1981) of the Cuban Professional Club in New Orleans and being included with 32 other women artists of the twentieth century, being the book titled "Latin American and Women Artists of the United States."

== Bibliography ==
- Obituaries & Guest Book, Ruth Gonzalez Mullen, (2011)
- Art Now Gallery Guide, Volume 10, Issues, 7-8 (1991), Art Now, Incorporated
