= John Mullan =

John Mullan may refer to:

- John Mullan (academic), professor of English at University College London
- John Mullan (Australian politician) (1871–1941)
- John Mullan (road builder) (1830–1909), American soldier, explorer and road builder
- John B. Mullan (1863–1955), New York state senator
- John Eddie Mullan (1923–2008), Irish Gaelic footballer

== See also ==
- John Mullane (born 1981), Irish Gaelic footballer
