= Dudley Maurice Newitt =

British chemical engineer (1894–1980)

- Born: 28 April 1894; London, United Kingdom
- Died: 14 March 1980 (aged 85); Farnham, Surrey, United Kingdom
- Education: Royal College of Science, Imperial College, London
- Known for: Contributions to chemical engineering, scientific director of Special Operations Executive
- Children: 2
- Awards: Rumford Medal (1962), Military Cross
- Scientific career
- Fields: Chemical engineering
- Workplaces: Imperial College London

Dudley Maurice Newitt FRS (28 April 1894 – 14 March 1980) was a British chemical engineer who was awarded the Rumford Medal in 1962 in recognition of his 'distinguished contributions to chemical engineering'.

== Biography ==
Newitt was born in London and started working as an assistant chemist for Nobel in Scotland. In the First World War, he served in the East Surrey Regiment and was awarded the Military Cross.

In 1921, he gained a first class Bachelor of Science in chemistry from the Royal College of Science in London, and went on to postgraduate studies in chemical engineering at Imperial College, London. During the Second World War, he was scientific director of Special Operations Executive responsible for the development of technology for sabotage and espionage. During this period he was elected a Fellow of the Royal Society.

In 1945, he was appointed as professor of chemical engineering at Imperial College. By 1952, he was made the head of department, being responsible for the new building (completed 1967). He was appointed pro-rector of the college in 1956 until his retirement in 1961. He died 14 March 1980 in Farnham, Surrey.

== Personal life ==
He married Aliex Schaeffer in 1919, but she died in childbirth in 1923, and the baby was stillborn. In 1933, he married Doris Garrod, and they had a son and a daughter.
