= Ruth Symes =

British children's writer and television scriptwriter

Ruth Louise Symes is the author of children's books and TV scripts including several episodes of Channel 4 / Jim Henson Company's series for pre-school children The Hoobs, and award-winning animation series PicMe. She has also worked with Channel 4 as the Writing Coach and Write a Children's Short Story competition Judge on the Richard & Judy show. One of her books Mondays at Monster School (Orion, 2005) was read on BBC television by Jenny Seagrove as part of the bedtime story hour.

Ruth Symes also writes for both adults and children under the pseudonym Megan Rix, with eight novels published by Puffin Books and an adult memoir published by Penguin's Michael Joseph imprint.

== Biography ==
Raised in Enfield where she attended the Bishop Stopford's School at Enfield, Ruth Symes initially taught children with special needs before becoming an author. Her first novel was the Carnegie Medal-nominated The Master of Secrets published in 1999.

Before writing professionally Symes had a variety of jobs, including teaching children with severe learning challenges, both in the UK and Singapore, where she was involved with the South East Asian Special Olympics.

Other jobs have included instructing aerobics, acting in a Chinese soap opera and playing the part of Jill Goose in the pantomime Mother Goose.

In 2006 she moved to Kempston with her husband Eric Wainwright.

== Published works ==
=== Novels ===
- The Master of Secrets (Puffin Books; 1997)
- The Mum Trap (Andersen Press; 2000), which was voted in the top 100 children's books of 2000
- Frankie's Romeo (Orion; 2002), which received a PAWS drama award in 2001.
- Bella Donna: Coven Road (Piccadilly Press; 2010)
- Bella Donna: Too Many Spells (Piccadilly Press; 2011)
- Bella Donna: Witchling (Piccadilly Press; 2011)
- Bella Donna: Cat Magic (Piccadilly Press; 2012)
- Bella Donna: Witch Camp (Piccadilly Press; 2013)
- Bella Donna: Bella Bewitched (Piccadilly Press; 2013)
- The Secret Animal Society: Cornflake the Dragon (Piccadilly Press; 2014)
- The Secret Animal Society: Spike the Sea Serpent (Piccadilly Press; 2015)
- The Secret Animal Society: Snowball the Baby Bigfoot (Piccadilly Press; 2015)

=== Picture books ===
- The Sheep Fairy (Chicken House; 2003)
- Floppy Ears (Orion; 2004)
- Mondays at Monster School (Orion; 2005)
- Harriet Dancing (Chicken House; 2008)
- Little Tail (Orion; 2006)
- Little Rex (Piccadilly Press; 2010)
- Little Rex, Big Brother (Piccadilly Press, UK; Albert Whitman and Company, USA; 2010) ISBN 978-0-8075-4636-9

=== Young readers ===
- Play - if you Dare
- The Twelfth Floor Kids
- Chip's Dad
- Smelly Sock Soup
- The Sarah Song

=== Radio ===
- Big Toe Radio Show for BBC 7
- Adapted The Sun, Moon and Stars for BBC Radio 4

=== Writing as Megan Rix ===
- Winston and the Marmalade Cat
- The Great Fire Dogs
- Echo Come Home
- The Great Escape
- The Victory Dogs
- The Bomber Dog
- A Soldier's Friend
- The Runaways
- The Hero Pup
- The Puppy That Came For Christmas
