= 2025 British Motocross Championship =

British Motocross Competition in 2025

The 2025 ACU British Motocross Championship season (known for sponsorship reasons as the Motul ACU British Motocross Championship) was the 73rd British Motocross Championship season.

The MX1 class in 2024 was won by 5-time FIM Motocross World Champion Jeffrey Herlings, who did not defend his title. Similarly, reigning MX2 class champion Cas Valk did not return to race in the UK in 2025, meaning both classes were without the defending champions.

Former champion Conrad Mewse took his fifth national title in the MX1 class, regaining the crown he lost to Herlings in 2024. In the MX2 class, veteran Tommy Searle took his fifth British title overall and his first in the smaller capacity class.

After several seasons of being run by promoter RHL Activities, 2025 saw the championship return to be run in house by the ACU.

== Race calendar and results ==
=== MX1 ===
Round	Date	Location	Race 1 Winner	Race 2 Winner	Round Winner
1	30 March	Hawkstone Park	(United Kingdom) Conrad Mewse	(United Kingdom) Conrad Mewse	(United Kingdom) Conrad Mewse
2	18 May	Canada Heights	(United Kingdom) Conrad Mewse	(United Kingdom) Conrad Mewse	(United Kingdom) Conrad Mewse
3	15 June	Blaxhall	(United Kingdom) Conrad Mewse	(United Kingdom) Conrad Mewse	(United Kingdom) Conrad Mewse
4	20 July	Preston Docks	(United Kingdom) Conrad Mewse	(United Kingdom) Conrad Mewse	(United Kingdom) Conrad Mewse
5	10 August	Landrake	(United Kingdom) Conrad Mewse	(United Kingdom) Conrad Mewse	(United Kingdom) Conrad Mewse
6	30 August	Duns	(Netherlands) Jeffrey Herlings	(Netherlands) Jeffrey Herlings	(Netherlands) Jeffrey Herlings
7	31 August	Duns	(Netherlands) Jeffrey Herlings	(Netherlands) Jeffrey Herlings	(Netherlands) Jeffrey Herlings
8	21 September	Lyng	(United Kingdom) Conrad Mewse	(United Kingdom) Conrad Mewse	(United Kingdom) Conrad Mewse

=== MX2 ===
Round	Date	Location	Race 1 Winner	Race 2 Winner	Round Winner
1	30 March	Hawkstone Park	(United Kingdom) Bobby Bruce	(United Kingdom) Billy Askew	(United Kingdom) Bobby Bruce
2	18 May	Canada Heights	(United Kingdom) Tommy Searle	(Spain) Oriol Oliver	(United Kingdom) Tommy Searle
3	15 June	Blaxhall	(Spain) Oriol Oliver	(Spain) Oriol Oliver	(Spain) Oriol Oliver
4	20 July	Preston Docks	(Netherlands) Kay de Wolf	(Netherlands) Kay de Wolf	(Netherlands) Kay de Wolf
5	10 August	Landrake	(United Kingdom) Ben Mustoe	(United Kingdom) Tommy Searle	(United Kingdom) Tommy Searle
6	30 August	Duns	(Spain) Oriol Oliver	(United Kingdom) Tommy Searle	(United Kingdom) Tommy Searle
7	31 August	Duns	(United Kingdom) Joe Brookes	(Spain) Oriol Oliver	(Spain) Oriol Oliver
8	21 September	Lyng	(United Kingdom) Calum Mitchell	(Spain) Oriol Oliver	(Spain) Oriol Oliver

=== Circuit locations ===
2025 British Motocross Championship locations

== MX1 ==
=== Participants ===
Team	Constructor	No	Rider	Rounds
Phoenix Tools Fantic Racing Team	Fantic	6	(United Kingdom) Carlton Husband	All
Phoenix Tools Fantic Racing Team	Fantic	47	(United Kingdom) Jed Etchells	6–7
Phoenix Tools Fantic Racing Team	Fantic	228	(United Kingdom) Charlie Cole	1, 4
KES Commercials KTM	KTM	7	(United Kingdom) Louie Kessell	All
Moto-Cycle Racing	Gas Gas	10	(United Kingdom) Jason Meara	1–2
	KTM	12	(United Kingdom) Ben Putnam	2
Apico Factory Racing Honda	Honda	16	(United Kingdom) Tom Grimshaw	4–8
Apico Factory Racing Honda	Honda	50	(United Kingdom) Martin Barr	1–5, 8
Site Sealants KTM	KTM	18	(United Kingdom) Gary Sharp	6–7
	Honda	20	(United Kingdom) Aidan Bruce	6
T.A.L.K Access/T.A.L.K Scaffolding	Gas Gas	22	(United Kingdom) Travis Steels	All
Bike It Kawasaki	Kawasaki	23	(United Kingdom) Taylor Hammal	2–8
Mills Racing	Yamaha	27	(United Kingdom) Chris Mills	1–5
	Yamaha	28	(United Kingdom) Harry Bradley	1–3
Dyce Carriers	KTM	33	(United Kingdom) Ben Edwards	1–3
SC Sporthomes Husqvarna	Husqvarna	41	(South Africa) Tristan Purdon	1–5
SC Sporthomes Husqvarna	Husqvarna	91	(United Kingdom) Charlie Putnam	All
	Yamaha	46	(United Kingdom) Ben Knight	4, 8
	Fantic	48	(United Kingdom) Thomas Dodsworth	4
	KTM	49	(United Kingdom) Callum Green	4
Danger UK	Honda	57	(United Kingdom) Tony Craig	4
GMR Yamaha	Yamaha	74	(United Kingdom) Tom Murphy	1–2, 4–8
Triple D Motosport/KTM UK	KTM	75	(United Kingdom) Dan Mundell	5
Red Bull KTM Factory Racing	KTM	84	(Netherlands) Jeffrey Herlings	6–7
Chambers KTM Racing	KTM	95	(United Kingdom) Dan Thornhill	All
Chambers KTM Racing	KTM	811	(United Kingdom) Adam Sterry	All
Lane Racing Team	Yamaha	100	(United Kingdom) Liam Gale	8
	Honda	103	(United Kingdom) Max Broadbelt	1, 3, 8
SRE Services fuelled by Garland Powersports	KTM	134	(United Kingdom) Liam Knight	All
GOMX	Yamaha	141	(United Kingdom) Nathan Green	1, 3–8
Seca Racing Team	TM	162	(Republic of Ireland) Stuart Edmonds	1–3, 5–8
JT166 Training Academy	KTM	166	(United Kingdom) Josh Taylor	5
Triumph West London	Triumph	180	(United Kingdom) Josh Spinks	2
Drysdale Motorcycles	Gas Gas	181	(United Kingdom) Ryan Thomson	6–7
Crendon Tru7 Honda Racing	Honda	184	(United Kingdom) Jamie Carpenter	1–4
Crendon Tru7 Honda Racing	Honda	426	(United Kingdom) Conrad Mewse	All
Comptons Commercials	KTM	190	(United Kingdom) Luke Benstead	1–3
HJA Racing	KTM	202	(United Kingdom) Tyler Westcott	8
Lexa MX Racing Team	Honda	212	(United Kingdom) John Adamson	All
Lexa MX Racing Team	Honda	326	(United Kingdom) Josh Gilbert	All
Team BWR	KTM	219	(United Kingdom) Jae Jeffries	3
Concept Yamaha Racing	Yamaha	220	(United Kingdom) Josh Canton	All
Seven Seven 2 Ride Kawasaki Race Team	Kawasaki	228	(United Kingdom) Charlie Cole	6–8
Seven Seven 2 Ride Kawasaki Race Team	Kawasaki	433	(United Kingdom) Jack Lindsay	1, 3
SAS TPC KTM	KTM	249	(France) Mathéo Miot	1–4
SAS TPC KTM	KTM	601	(United Kingdom) Kelton Gwyther	8
KG Bricklaying	KTM	601	(United Kingdom) Kelton Gwyther	3
Dirt Store Triumph	Triumph	260	(United Kingdom) Dylan Woodcock	8
Dirt Store Triumph	Triumph	912	(United Kingdom) Joel Rizzi	1–7
FUS Marsh Honda Racing	Honda	292	(United Kingdom) James Dodd	5
	KTM	295	(United Kingdom) Ross Rutherford	6–7
FeehilyMX	Gas Gas	300	(United Kingdom) Charlie Hamlet	1, 3, 5–6
Matt Pope Motorcycles	Kawasaki	339	(United Kingdom) Joe Hall	8
John Banks Honda	Honda	365	(United Kingdom) Sam Nunn	1, 3
Westons	Honda	401	(United Kingdom) Jack Beniston	All
Lings Triumph	Triumph	411	(United Kingdom) Declan Whittle	1, 3
Lings Triumph	Triumph	421	(United Kingdom) Bayliss Utting	8
	KTM	447	(United Kingdom) Simon Booth	5, 8
RJ Francis/DRD/MCT/J Taylor Construction	Yamaha	477	(United Kingdom) Connor Bunkle	3, 8
GH Motorcycles	Yamaha	499	(United Kingdom) Ben Cole	8
	KTM	519	(United Kingdom) Dean Norris	2
	Kawasaki	592	(Sweden) Freddie Bartlett	4
	KTM	702	(United Kingdom) Harrison McCann	1
ASA United Gas Gas	Gas Gas	711	(United Kingdom) James Cottrell	1–2
DK Off-road powered by Bikesport Newcastle	Honda	714	(United Kingdom) Brad Todd	1–3, 6–8
Stebbings Car Superstore/MPM	Honda	776	(United Kingdom) Charlie Nudds	3
Substance JPR KTM	KTM	957	(United Kingdom) Jake Preston	1–2, 8

=== Riders Championship ===
Pos	Rider	Bike	HAW (England)		CAN (England)		BLA (England)		PRE (England)		LAN (England)		DUN (Scotland)		DUN (Scotland)		LYN (England)		Points
1	(United Kingdom) Conrad Mewse	Honda	1	1	1	1	1	1	1	1	1	1	2	2	2	2	1	1	388
2	(United Kingdom) Adam Sterry	KTM	2	2	2	2	6	2	2	2	5	2	4	3	5	4	2	2	323
3	(United Kingdom) Josh Gilbert	Honda	4	3	3	3	2	Ret	6	5	2	3	3	4	3	3	3	4	289
4	(United Kingdom) Taylor Hammal	Kawasaki			4	17	5	4	4	4	4	4	5	5	4	7	5	3	228
5	(United Kingdom) John Adamson	Honda	7	9	14	4	16	Ret	Ret	6	7	5	8	7	6	5	4	5	193
6	(United Kingdom) Dan Thornhill	KTM	13	17	13	12	12	12	10	9	8	7	11	11	10	6	8	8	169
7	(United Kingdom) Carlton Husband	Fantic	9	8	10	10	10	11	12	Ret	16	12	9	10	11	10	9	9	159
8	(South Africa) Tristan Purdon	Husqvarna	3	Ret	5	8	3	3	3	3	3	Ret							149
9	(United Kingdom) Tom Grimshaw	Honda							8	8	6	6	7	8	9	9	7	6	136
10	(United Kingdom) Martin Barr	Honda	Ret	7	12	9	8	5	7	7	10	11					13	12	130
11	(United Kingdom) Brad Todd	Honda	6	5	16	5	DNS	DNS					6	6	7	Ret	6	7	125
12	(United Kingdom) Joel Rizzi	Triumph	15	11	9	Ret	13	8	5	Ret	20	14	10	17	8	Ret			101
13	(Netherlands) Jeffrey Herlings	KTM											1	1	1	1			100
14	(United Kingdom) Jamie Carpenter	Honda	5	4	6	6	4	6	Ret	DNS									97
15	(United Kingdom) Liam Knight	KTM	12	13	21	21	11	13	14	10	14	16	17	14	19	16	Ret	13	91
16	(United Kingdom) Charlie Putnam	Husqvarna	Ret	DNS	18	18	17	15	11	11	12	9	Ret	15	18	13	19	18	79
17	(United Kingdom) Louie Kessell	KTM	21	19	24	23	Ret	16	19	17	9	8	15	13	15	11	18	15	77
18	(United Kingdom) Chris Mills	Yamaha	14	DNS	7	15	7	7	9	Ret	15	18							76
19	(United Kingdom) Travis Steels	Gas Gas	Ret	24	Ret	25	20	17	17	14	18	23	16	12	13	15	10	14	65
20	(United Kingdom) Jason Meara	Gas Gas	8	10	8	7													51
21	(France) Mathéo Miot	KTM	10	12	15	20	9	9	Ret	DNS									51
22	(United Kingdom) Tom Murphy	Yamaha	Ret	27	25	16			13	12	DNS	22	19	18	21	12	11	16	51
23	(United Kingdom) Jed Etchells	Fantic											13	9	14	8			40
24	(United Kingdom) Jack Beniston	Honda	20	18	23	22	19	23	18	18	17	17	18	19	16	19	17	17	40
25	(United Kingdom) Ben Edwards	KTM	11	6	17	11	Ret	DNS											39
26	(United Kingdom) Luke Benstead	KTM	17	14	22	14	14	10											36
27	(Republic of Ireland) Stuart Edmonds	TM	19	Ret	20	19	DNS	Ret			11	15	21	Ret	Ret	14	14	20	36
28	(United Kingdom) Charlie Cole	Fantic	Ret	DNS					DNS	DNS									26
28	(United Kingdom) Charlie Cole	Kawasaki											12	20	12	Ret	16	19	26
29	(United Kingdom) Sam Nunn	Honda	16	15			15	14											24
30	(United Kingdom) Ross Rutherford	KTM											14	16	17	17			20
31	(United Kingdom) Josh Taylor	KTM									13	10							19
32	(United Kingdom) Bayliss Utting	Triumph															12	11	19
33	(United Kingdom) Josh Spinks	Triumph			11	13													18
34	(United Kingdom) Max Broadbelt	Honda	Ret	16			Ret	DNS									Ret	10	16
35	(United Kingdom) Callum Green	KTM							15	13									14
36	(United Kingdom) Tony Craig	Honda							16	15									11
37	(United Kingdom) Declan Whittle	Triumph	18	20			18	18											10
38	(United Kingdom) Josh Canton	Yamaha	22	21	28	24	24	20	20	16	21	20	22	23	23	20	24	21	9
39	(United Kingdom) James Dodd	Honda									Ret	13							8
40	(United Kingdom) Dylan Woodcock	Triumph															15	29	6
41	(United Kingdom) Ryan Thomson	Gas Gas											Ret	21	20	18			4
42	(United Kingdom) Dan Mundell	KTM									19	19							4
43	(United Kingdom) Thomas Dodsworth	Fantic							21	19									2
44	(United Kingdom) Nathan Green	Yamaha	24	26			22	22	Ret	20	22	21	20	22	22	21	22	27	2
45	(United Kingdom) Charlie Hamlet	Gas Gas	26	23			21	19			Ret	Ret	Ret	DNS					2
46	(United Kingdom) James Cottrell	Gas Gas	Ret	Ret	19	Ret													2
47	(United Kingdom) Kelton Gwyther	KTM					25	21									20	25	1
	(United Kingdom) Ben Knight	Yamaha							22	Ret							21	23	0
	(United Kingdom) Jake Preston	KTM	27	22	29	27											23	24	0
	(United Kingdom) Tyler Westcott	KTM															DNS	22	0
	(United Kingdom) Harry Bradley	Yamaha	23	25	26	26	23	Ret											0
	(United Kingdom) Gary Sharp	KTM											23	25	24	Ret			0
	(United Kingdom) Simon Booth	KTM									23	24					26	26	0
	(United Kingdom) Aidan Bruce	Honda											24	24					0
	(United Kingdom) Connor Bunkle	Yamaha					26	24									25	28	0
	(United Kingdom) Jack Lindsay	Kawasaki	25	Ret			27	Ret											0
	(United Kingdom) Jae Jeffries	KTM					28	25											0
	(United Kingdom) Ben Putnam	KTM			27	Ret													0
	(United Kingdom) Liam Gale	Yamaha															27	Ret	0
	(United Kingdom) Harrison McCann	KTM	28	28															0
	(United Kingdom) Joe Hall	Kawasaki															28	30	0
	(United Kingdom) Charlie Nudds	Honda					Ret	DNS											0
	(United Kingdom) Dean Norris	KTM			DNS	DNS													0
	(Sweden) Freddie Bartlett	Kawasaki							DNS	DNS									0
	(United Kingdom) Ben Cole	Yamaha															DNS	DNS	0
Pos	Rider	Bike	HAW (England)		CAN (England)		BLA (England)		PRE (England)		LAN (England)		DUN (Scotland)		DUN (Scotland)		LYN (England)		Points

== MX2 ==
=== Participants ===
Team	Constructor	No	Rider	Rounds
Nestaan Husqvarna Factory Racing	Husqvarna	1	(Netherlands) Kay de Wolf	4
	Yamaha	2	(South Africa) Neville Bradshaw	2, 8
Worx Scaffolding Total Triumph Oakleaf	Triumph	4	(United Kingdom) George Hopkins	1–2, 4–8
Worx Scaffolding Total Triumph Oakleaf	Triumph	32	(United Kingdom) Calum Mitchell	All
Worx Scaffolding Total Triumph Oakleaf	Triumph	925	(United Kingdom) Lennox Dickinson	5–8
	KTM	925	(United Kingdom) Lennox Dickinson	1–2
Apico/Leatt/Masters of MX	KTM	5	(United Kingdom) Liam Bennett	1–3, 5, 8
Southside MX/SPLandscapes	Kawasaki	7	(United Kingdom) Chester Hyde	1–2
CM Groundworks/True House	Honda	8	(United Kingdom) Callum McCaul	8
Concept Yamaha Racing	Yamaha	10	(United Kingdom) Jonathan Roderick-Evans	2–3, 5–8
Concept Yamaha Racing	Yamaha	661	(United Kingdom) Josh Coleman	1–2, 4–8
	Yamaha	11	(United Kingdom) Gary Ashley	2
	KTM	14	(United Kingdom) Harrison Greenough	1, 4–5
	Yamaha	14	(United Kingdom) Harrison Greenough	8
FUS Marsh Honda Racing	Honda	15	(United Kingdom) Henry Williams	5
Seven Seven 2 Ride Kawasaki Race Team	Kawasaki	17	(United Kingdom) Matt Bayliss	3
Seven Seven 2 Ride Kawasaki Race Team	Kawasaki	49	(Iceland) Eiður Pálmarsson	4, 8
Seven Seven 2 Ride Kawasaki Race Team	Kawasaki	231	(United Kingdom) Rory Jones	1
Seven Seven 2 Ride Kawasaki Race Team	Kawasaki	433	(United Kingdom) Jack Lindsay	5–7
Seven Seven 2 Ride Kawasaki Race Team	Kawasaki	592	(Sweden) Freddie Bartlett	1–2
Ultimate Wheels Kawasaki	Kawasaki	592	(Sweden) Freddie Bartlett	5
SC Sporthomes Husqvarna	Husqvarna	19	(United Kingdom) Syd Putnam	All
SC Sporthomes Husqvarna	Husqvarna	62	(United States) Whispern Smith	1
SC Sporthomes Husqvarna	Husqvarna	422	(United Kingdom) Charlie Heyman	All
Mooney's Hyundai/ServiceMaster Restore	Honda	20	(United Kingdom) Cailum Meara	1–2
SRE Services Fuelled by Garland Powersports	KTM	24	(United Kingdom) Liam Garland	1–7
Bike It Kawasaki	Kawasaki	33	(Netherlands) Kay Karssemakers	4–7
Bike It Kawasaki	Kawasaki	79	(United Kingdom) Bobby Bruce	1–3
X-Cast/Jim Aim Racing	KTM	34	(United Kingdom) Joshua Bassett	2
Dixon Honda Racing	Honda	38	(United Kingdom) Gavin Stevenson	All
Total Triumph	Triumph	40	(United Kingdom) Ezra Blackwell	All
Plews Tyres	KTM	42	(United Kingdom) Sonny Rooney	1, 4, 8
	KTM	42	(United Kingdom) Rhys Whyment	6
Crendon Tru7 Honda Racing	Honda	45	(United Kingdom) Jake Nicholls	1–7
SAS TPC KTM	KTM	46	(Netherlands) Davy Pootjes	6–8
SAS TPC KTM	KTM	247	(France) Florian Miot	1, 3–4
Moto-Cycle Racing	Gas Gas	48	(United Kingdom) Adam Collings	1–2, 4–8
Moto-Cycle Racing	Gas Gas	71	(United Kingdom) Jack Meara	1–3, 6
Verslunin Moto	Gas Gas	49	(Iceland) Eiður Pálmarsson	1–3
Gabriel SS24 KTM Factory Juniors	KTM	51	(Spain) Oriol Oliver	2–3, 5–8
Gabriel SS24 KTM Factory Juniors	KTM	494	(Germany) Maximilian Werner	1, 4–8
Gabriel SS24 KTM Factory Juniors	KTM	574	(Netherlands) Gyan Doensen	1–5
ASA United Gas Gas	Gas Gas	57	(United Kingdom) Kyle McNicol	1, 3–4, 6–7
ASA United Gas Gas	Gas Gas	163	(United Kingdom) Ben Mustoe	1–7
ASA United Gas Gas	Gas Gas	279	(United Kingdom) Harley O'Callaghan	8
	Yamaha	60	(United Kingdom) Brad Anderson	2
Lexa MX Racing Team	Honda	70	(United Kingdom) Harvey Cashmore	1, 3–4, 6–8
723 Race Bikes Fantic	Fantic	72	(United Kingdom) Raife Broadley	All
	Yamaha	77	(Sri Lanka) Kamaldeen Hamdhan	3
	Yamaha	77	(United Kingdom) Jay Hague	6
	Husqvarna	90	(United Kingdom) Alex Hamer	1, 4
Mr T Racing/FUS	Honda	99	(United Kingdom) Jake Walker	1
	KTM	99	(United Kingdom) Josh Buchanan	6
Dirt Store Triumph	Triumph	100	(United Kingdom) Tommy Searle	1–3, 5–8
Dirt Store Triumph	Triumph	260	(United Kingdom) Dylan Woodcock	4
Dirt Store Triumph	Triumph	441	(United Kingdom) Billy Askew	1–6
Triumph York	Triumph	101	(United Kingdom) Tyla Hooley	1–6
	KTM	115	(United Kingdom) Lewis Parkinson	4
119 Pro Race	Yamaha	119	(United Kingdom) Bailey Johnston	8
KTM Motoland	KTM	133	(France) Tom Caneele	1
Drysdale Motorcycles	Gas Gas	181	(United Kingdom) Ryan Thomson	1
	KTM	191	(United Kingdom) David Russell	1
RB Racing	KTM	199	(United Kingdom) Jayden Jones	1–2, 4
RB Racing	Husqvarna	371	(United Kingdom) Oliver Abbott	1–2
HJA Racing	KTM	202	(United Kingdom) Ty Westcott	1, 3–7
DMC Moto	KTM	215	(United Kingdom) Oliver Davis	1
	KTM	217	(United Kingdom) Eddie Wade	6–8
	KTM	235	(Lithuania) Grantas Lengvinas	2
	KTM	281	(United Kingdom) Charlie Griffiths	1
	KTM	310	(United Kingdom) Lucy Barker	8
	KTM	311	(United Kingdom) Aaron McCarroll	6–7
	Honda	312	(United Kingdom) Zachary Pearson	2–3, 6–8
Poppin Candy	KTM	331	(United Kingdom) Will Haddock	4
Chambers KTM Racing	KTM	337	(United Kingdom) Glenn McCormick	All
Chambers KTM Racing	KTM	456	(United Kingdom) Ollie Colmer	All
	Honda	403	(United Kingdom) Rowan Hill	2
AIT Racing Team	Fantic	407	(United Kingdom) Jake Davies	4
AVT Campers KTM	KTM	410	(United Kingdom) James Barker	1–2
	Triumph	419	(United Kingdom) Joe Brookes	5–8
Lings Triumph	Triumph	421	(United Kingdom) Bayliss Utting	1–3
	Honda	448	(United Kingdom) Sam Menzies	3
Southease MX	Yamaha	464	(United Kingdom) Travis Laughton	8
DirtHut	KTM	472	(United Kingdom) Max Harris	1–5, 8
Phoenix Tools Fantic Racing Team	Fantic	479	(United Kingdom) Josh Vail	All
	KTM	511	(United Kingdom) Steven Clarke	1–3
3 flo Madison Crescent Yamaha	Yamaha	544	(United Kingdom) Ollie Bubb	1, 3, 5
Staffordshire Triumph Racing Team	Triumph	555	(United Kingdom) McKenzie Marshall	2
	Kawasaki	616	(United Kingdom) Max Corke	4
AD Modular Racing	KTM	711	(United Kingdom) Joel Fisher	1
JPN Services/Narna Media	Kawasaki	731	(United Kingdom) Adam Reeve	8
Apico Factory Racing/DBC Motorcycles	Honda	747	(United Kingdom) Jack Davis	1
OffRoadWorld/MAX MX	Yamaha	807	(United Kingdom) Luca Pegg	1–2, 4–8
	Kawasaki	919	(United Kingdom) George Corke	4
Ace Race Shop/Easy Clean Ltd/DMS Moto	KTM	924	(United Kingdom) Lewis Proud	1

=== Riders Championship ===
Pos	Rider	Bike	HAW (England)		CAN (England)		BLA (England)		PRE (England)		LAN (England)		DUN (Scotland)		DUN (Scotland)		LYN (England)		Points
1	(United Kingdom) Tommy Searle	Triumph	2	3	1	2	2	3			2	1	4	1	2	5	Ret	5	275
2	(United Kingdom) Charlie Heyman	Husqvarna	5	6	10	7	5	6	4	3	3	4	6	3	4	7	3	4	268
3	(Spain) Oriol Oliver	KTM			17	1	1	1			7	2	1	4	3	1	2	1	245
4	(United Kingdom) Ben Mustoe	Gas Gas	4	7	5	6	6	7	6	4	1	Ret	2	5	5	6			219
5	(United Kingdom) Glenn McCormick	KTM	7	8	6	13	10	12	8	5	11	9	8	11	7	11	4	13	186
6	(United Kingdom) Ollie Colmer	KTM	8	4	7	12	4	10	5	Ret	10	Ret	10	Ret	11	9	5	3	184
7	(United Kingdom) Calum Mitchell	Triumph	16	10	14	15	11	13	14	12	5	Ret	9	8	6	8	1	2	179
8	(United Kingdom) Jake Nicholls	Honda	14	5	19	4	7	4	10	7	9	7	7	9	12	16			166
9	(United Kingdom) Billy Askew	Triumph	6	1	4	3	3	2	11	26	4	5	Ret	DNS					164
10	(United Kingdom) Josh Vail	Fantic	9	15	13	11	9	11	7	9	16	11	14	10	13	13	9	8	148
11	(Netherlands) Kay Karssemakers	Kawasaki							2	2	6	3	3	6	Ret	2			136
12	(Netherlands) Gyan Doensen	KTM	3	17	2	8	27	5	3	6	12	10							130
13	(United Kingdom) Joe Brookes	Triumph									8	6	5	2	1	4	6	Ret	124
14	(Germany) Maximilian Werner	KTM	Ret	DNS					9	8	13	8	13	7	9	23	7	Ret	109
15	(United Kingdom) Bobby Bruce	Kawasaki	1	2	3	5	16	16											93
16	(United Kingdom) Gavin Stevenson	Honda	12	14	34	27	14	15	12	10	21	14	21	16	18	Ret	10	7	87
17	(United Kingdom) Liam Garland	KTM	17	13	18	18	Ret	Ret	17	14	14	Ret	11	12	8	10			79
18	(United Kingdom) Raife Broadley	Fantic	23	12	8	16	12	14	16	17	19	24	29	20	15	12	23	12	74
19	(United Kingdom) Adam Collings	Gas Gas	32	23	11	29			18	15	17	16	20	17	14	14	12	11	61
20	(United Kingdom) Eddie Wade	KTM											12	24	10	3	8	10	53
21	(Netherlands) Kay de Wolf	Husqvarna							1	1									50
22	(United Kingdom) Lennox Dickinson	KTM	18	16	12	17													50
22	(United Kingdom) Lennox Dickinson	Triumph									25	25	15	19	20	18	15	9	50
23	(United Kingdom) Tyla Hooley	Triumph	29	DNS	24	14	18	DNS	13	11	15	15	16	Ret					45
24	(Netherlands) Davy Pootjes	KTM											Ret	13	Ret	DNS	11	Ret	32
25	(United Kingdom) Max Harris	KTM	13	19	23	20	22	20	19	13	Ret	DNS					13	15	32
26	(United Kingdom) Steven Clarke	KTM	15	31	Ret	9	8	Ret											31
27	(United Kingdom) James Barker	KTM	10	9	20	22													24
28	(France) Florian Miot	KTM	11	Ret			19	9	Ret	DNS									24
29	(United Kingdom) Brad Anderson	Yamaha			9	10													23
30	(United Kingdom) Tyler Westcott	KTM	Ret	DNS			21	18	20	16	20	22	24	18	17	15			23
31	(Sweden) Freddie Bartlett	Kawasaki	Ret	18	15	19					18	13							22
32	(United Kingdom) Matt Bayliss	Kawasaki					13	8											21
33	(United Kingdom) George Hopkins	Triumph	30	Ret	Ret	DNS			28	Ret	29	20	19	15	22	17	21	Ret	21
34	(South Africa) Neville Bradshaw	Yamaha			21	25											14	6	20
35	(United Kingdom) Harrison Greenough	KTM	20	22					Ret	18	24	17							18
35	(United Kingdom) Harrison Greenough	Yamaha															18	19	18
36	(United Kingdom) Bayliss Utting	Triumph	22	11	27	24	17	17											18
37	(United Kingdom) Josh Coleman	Yamaha	19	20	22	21			21	19	22	19	Ret	21	16	19	19	16	17
38	(United Kingdom) Sonny Rooney	KTM	Ret	DNS					Ret	21							17	17	14
39	(United Kingdom) Kyle McNichol	Gas Gas	26	24			24	19	24	22			17	14	Ret	20			14
40	(Iceland) Eiður Pálmarsson	Gas Gas	33	29	26	26	15	Ret											13
40	(Iceland) Eiður Pálmarsson	Kawasaki							15	20							25	18	13
41	(United Kingdom) Bailey Johnston	Yamaha															22	14	9
42	(United Kingdom) Henry Williams	Honda									Ret	12							9
43	(United Kingdom) Syd Putnam	Husqvarna	DNQ	DNQ	33	28	26	22	27	23	27	23	23	22	19	21	27	22	8
44	(United Kingdom) Liam Bennett	KTM	Ret	26	Ret	DNS	20	21			Ret	DNS					16	21	6
45	(United Kingdom) Gary Ashley	Yamaha			16	23													5
46	(United Kingdom) Ollie Bubb	Yamaha	DNQ	DNQ			23	DNS			23	18							3
47	(United Kingdom) Jay Hague	Yamaha											18	25					3
48	(United Kingdom) Lucy Barker	KTM															20	20	2
	(United Kingdom) Luca Pegg	Yamaha	DNQ	DNQ	30	31			25	27	26	21	22	23	Ret	22	24	24	0
	(United Kingdom) Jack Meara	Gas Gas	24	21	28	Ret	DNS	DNS					Ret	DNS					0
	(United Kingdom) Jack Lindsay	Kawasaki									31	27	26	31	21	Ret			0
	(United Kingdom) Ryan Thomson	Gas Gas	21	Ret															0
	(United Kingdom) Dylan Woodcock	Triumph							22	Ret									0
	(United Kingdom) Jonathan Roderick-Evans	Yamaha			29	32	28	23			28	Ret	31	26	23	26	Ret	Ret	0
	(United Kingdom) Harvey Cashmore	Honda	DNQ	DNQ			25	24	31	25			27	29	Ret	DNS	26	23	0
	(United Kingdom) Jake Davies	Fantic							23	Ret									0
	(United Kingdom) Ezra Blackwell	Triumph	DNQ	DNQ	36	34	29	25	30	24	30	26	30	30	26	24	31	25	0
	(United Kingdom) Aaron McCarroll	KTM											28	28	24	DNS			0
	(United Kingdom) Zachary Pearson	Honda			DNQ	33	30	26					32	32	25	25	30	Ret	0
	(France) Tom Caneele	KTM	25	25															0
	(United Kingdom) Rhys Whyment	KTM											25	27					0
	(United Kingdom) Jayden Jones	KTM	DNQ	DNQ	25	DSQ			Ret	DNS									0
	(United Kingdom) Travis Laughton	Yamaha															28	26	0
	(United Kingdom) Max Corke	Kawasaki							26	DNS									0
	(United Kingdom) Joel Fisher	KTM	27	27															0
	(United Kingdom) Callum McCaul	Honda															29	27	0
	(United Kingdom) Chester Hyde	Kawasaki	28	Ret	31	30													0
	(United Kingdom) Charlie Griffiths	KTM	Ret	28															0
	(United Kingdom) Adam Reeve	Kawasaki															Ret	28	0
	(United Kingdom) Harley O'Callaghan	Gas Gas															32	29	0
	(United Kingdom) Lewis Parkinson	KTM							29	Ret									0
	(United Kingdom) Cailum Meara	Honda	31	30	32	Ret													0
	(United Kingdom) Josh Buchanan	KTM											33	Ret					0
	(Lithuania) Grantas Lengvinas	KTM			37	35													0
	(United Kingdom) McKenzie Marshall	Triumph			35	Ret													0
	(United Kingdom) Alex Hamer	Husqvarna	DNQ	DNQ					Ret	Ret									0
	(United Kingdom) Jake Walker	Honda	Ret	DNS															0
	(United Kingdom) Sam Menzies	Honda					Ret	DNS											0
	(United Kingdom) Joshua Bassett	KTM			DNQ	Ret													0
	(United Kingdom) George Corke	Kawasaki							Ret	DNS									0
	(United Kingdom) Will Haddock	KTM							Ret	DNS									0
	(Sri Lanka) Kamaldeen Hamdhan	Honda					DNS	DNS											0
	(United Kingdom) Oliver Abbott	Husqvarna	DNQ	DNQ	DNQ	DNQ													0
	(United States) Whispern Smith	Husqvarna	DNQ	DNQ															0
	(United Kingdom) Lewis Proud	KTM	DNQ	DNQ															0
	(United Kingdom) David Russell	Honda	DNQ	DNQ															0
	(United Kingdom) Jack Davis	Honda	DNQ	DNQ															0
	(United Kingdom) Oliver Davis	KTM	DNQ	DNQ															0
	(United Kingdom) Rory Jones	Kawasaki	DNQ	DNQ															0
	(United Kingdom) Rowan Hill	Honda			DNQ	DNQ													0
Pos	Rider	Bike	HAW (England)		CAN (England)		BLA (England)		PRE (England)		LAN (England)		DUN (Scotland)		DUN (Scotland)		LYN (England)		Points
