= Museum of the Home =

Museum in London, England

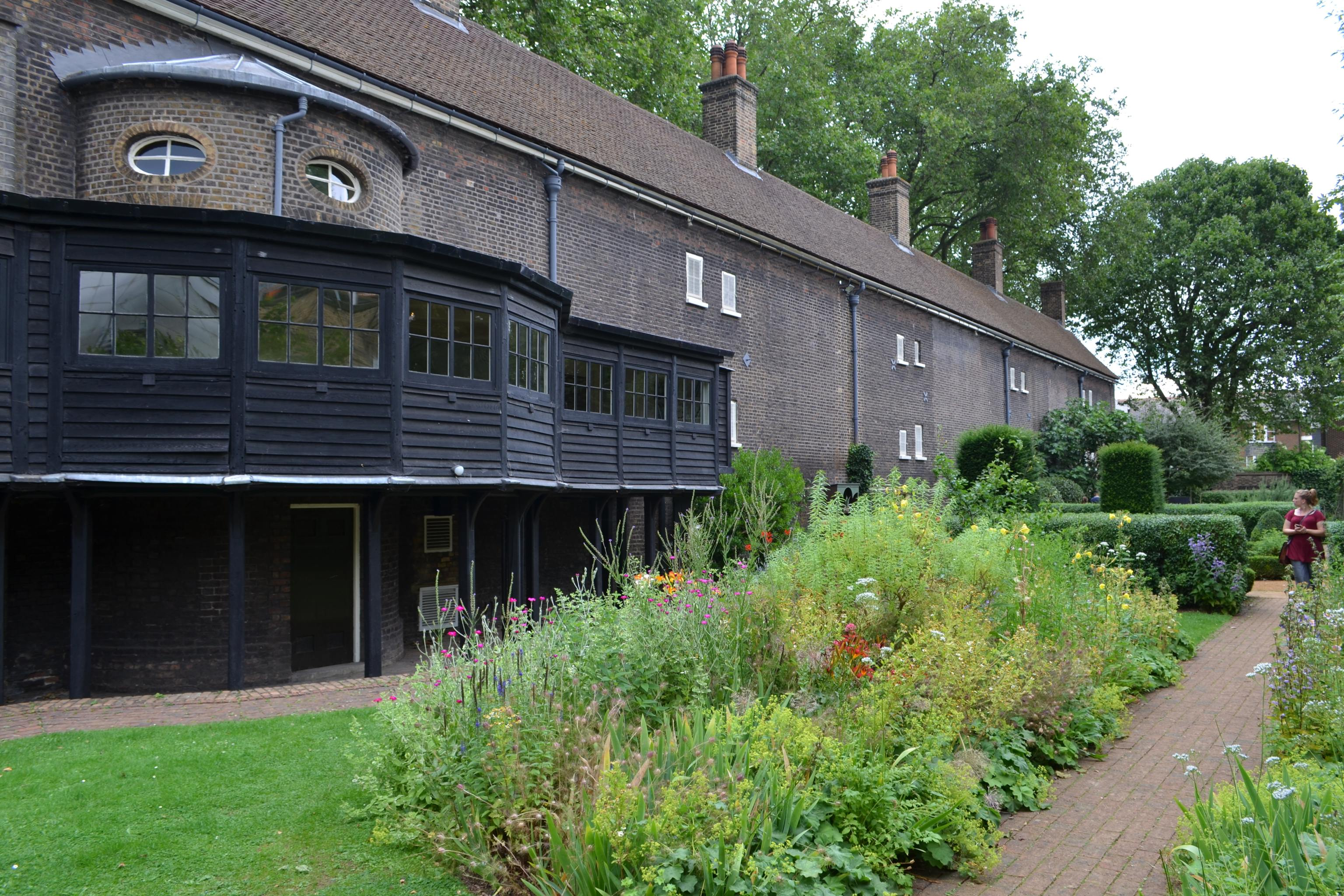
- Front long elevation which has jettying and garden

- Location of the Museum of the Home in London
- Established: 1914; 112 years ago
- Location: Geffrye Almshouses; 136 Kingsland Road; London, E2; United Kingdom
- Coordinates: 51.531742°N 0.076630°W
- Visitors: 120,000 (annually)
- Director: Sonia Solicari
- Public transit access: Hoxton
- Website: www.museumofthehome.org.uk

The Museum of the Home, formerly the Geffrye Museum, is a free museum in the 18th-century Grade I-listed former almshouses on Kingsland Road in Hoxton, London. The museum's change of name was announced in 2019. The museum explores home and home life from 1600 to the present day with galleries which ask questions about 'home', present diverse lived experiences, and examine the psychological and emotional relationships people have with the idea of "home" alongside a series of period room displays.

In 2018, the museum had about 120,000 visitors before closing for two and a half years, during which an extensive refurbishment and building programme took place. The museum reopened as the Museum of the Home in summer 2021 with a mission to reveal and rethink the ways we live, in order to live better together, and with 80 per cent more exhibition space for its collections and 50 per cent more public space. The Museum of the Home now has new basement galleries (The Home Galleries), a cafe, learning pavilion, collections and reference libraries, several events spaces, and replanted gardens.

== History ==
In 1714, almshouses were built on the site to house the widows of ironmongers. There were 14 four-room houses, for up to 56 pensioners, with a large garden.

The almshouses were funded by a bequest from Sir Robert Geffrye, a merchant who had served as Lord Mayor of London and Master of the Ironmongers' Company. He was involved in the transatlantic slave trade and made his money working with the East India Company and the Royal African Company. He died in 1703, before the almshouses were built.

The Museum's director Sonia Solicari views the almshouse as "a viable model for 21st-century housing", comparing it to the modern concept of pod living and saying that "The home of the future is looking a lot like the past."

The Metropolitan Public Gardens Association contributed to the funding for the acquisition of the former almshouses and garden by Shoreditch Metropolitan Council, and the MPGA's landscape gardener Fanny Wilkinson laid out the garden in 1900–01.

In 1911, the Ironmongers' Company decided the area had become too dangerous for pensioners, moved them to the country, and sold the buildings to the London County Council (LCC).

== Museum ==
=== 1914 – 2018: Geffrye Museum ===
When the LCC took over the site to create the Geffrye Museum, Wilkinson's design was replaced with a new layout. The area was a centre of the furniture trade, so it was decided to establish a reference collection of furniture and interiors to inspire the manufactures. The museum opened on 2 April 1914.

When furniture production moved away, the focus of the museum shifted to a younger audience, particularly school children. The curator between 1935 and 1940, Marjorie Quennell, introduced rooms furnished as at a series of historical times.

In the latter part of the 20th century it was run by the Inner London Education Authority (ILEA). Following the abolition of ILEA, the museum became a charitable trust in 1991.

In 1992, a herb garden was opened on a formerly derelict site to the north of the building, partly funded again by the MPGA, which then awarded the herb garden its London Spade Award in 1992.

In 1998, the museum expanded with the opening of a horseshoe-shaped extension designed by Branson Coates Architecture, providing space to add a 20th Century exhibition, shop and education rooms.

=== 2018 – 2021: Redevelopment project ===
In January 2018, the museum closed for an £18m development project, reopening in June 2021.

The museum's change of name was announced in 2019. In light of the Black Lives Matter protests and renewed interest in Britain's historic involvement in slavery, part of the decision to remove Geffrye's name reflected these concerns. Discussions around the statue of Geffrye were also had (discussed in detail below).

In 2020, during the closure, in light of the Covid-19 lockdowns, the museum led by Director of Curative Collections and Programmes, Tamsin Ace, undertook the project Stay Home. The project aimed to document life in the UK during the Covid-19 pandemic. The museum put out a call on the BBC's "Culture in Quarantine" platform, inviting the public to share their photos of living in lockdown, as well as answer a questionnaire about how their experience of home had changed during this time. The museum received over 400 submissions. On 10 October 2020 (coinciding with World Homeless Day), the museum also hosted an online "Festival of Home", produced in partnership with the London Homeless Collective. The festival consisted of livestreamed events held to raise awareness of homelessness.

Until the closure, the main permanent displays were a series of room settings furnished and decorated to show the main living spaces and elements of domestic life through the centuries, reflecting changes in society, behaviour, style and taste. Since reopening, the museum has new galleries to "explore the concept of home through people's everyday experiences of making, keeping and being at home over the last 400 years".

With the reopening of the refurbished and extended buildings in summer 2021 the museum has 80 per cent more exhibition space for its collections and 50 per cent more public space, with its main entrance now facing Hoxton station.

The Financial Times' correspondent praised the Museum's refurbishment and exhibits, stating:

"There is nothing else quite like the Museum of the Home ... Other museums tend to dwell on the finest artefacts, the most famous chairs, lamps or most beautiful manufactured pieces. This is not that. This is about how even the humblest of homes reveals rich, unique stories, a recognition that culture is not only the domain of museums but of all of our front rooms, bedside tables and the snaps in photo albums (or on phones) of years of family dinners in the room with slightly ropey wallpaper, the stopped clock, those old plates and granny’s dining table."

The Times described Michael McMillan's West Indian front room: "The stand-out set is the new West Indian front room circa 1976 with its glittery cushions, pineapple ice bucket and kitsch souvenirs from St Vincent. A proper home with cheering clutter ... The gardens are heavenly, the gift shop divine. It might be the best present-shopping spot in London."

=== 2021 – Present: Museum of the Home ===
In 2022, the museum held a Festival of Sleep and a Winter Festival, and the BBC series Antiques Roadshow filmed a toys and childhood special at the museum.

In 2023, the museum began to host exhibitions exploring the meaning of home to diverse communities, with disability rights activist Paul Darke curating an exhibition displaying toys that represent disability including characters from Ironside, The Simpsons and the Barbie collection. In early summer 2023, No Place Like Home (A Vietnamese Exhibition) Part II was held at the museum and was co-curated and led by KV Duong and Hoa Dung Clerget, featuring a group of Vietnamese diasporic artists.

In June 2023, the museum announced the joint acquisition with Tate of Rebecca Solomon's 1861 painting, A Young Teacher.

== Architecture ==
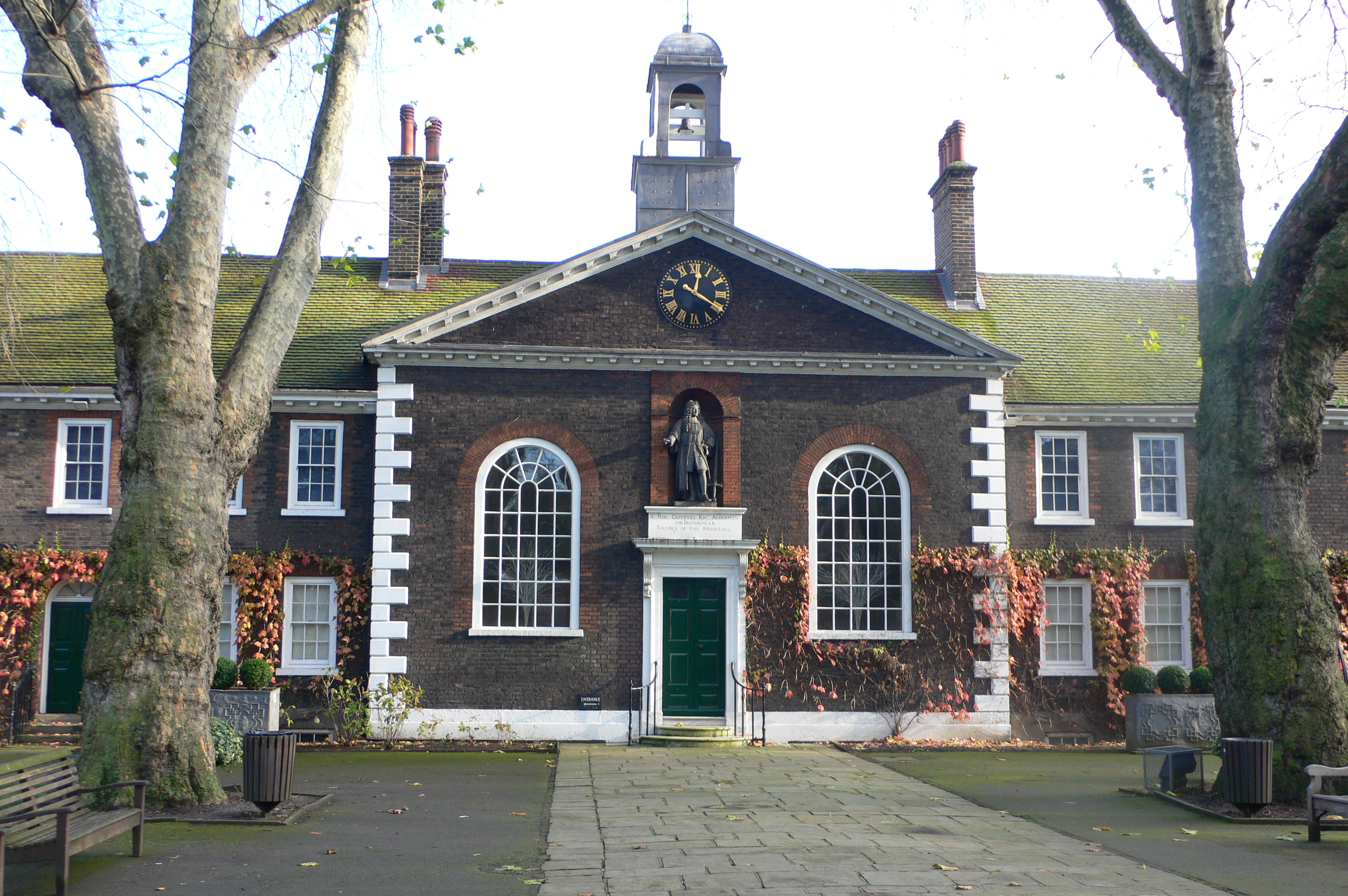
East front

=== Listing ===
Several structures connected with the museum are listed on the National Heritage List for England. The main museum building is Grade I listed and the niche in the northwest corner of the forecourt of the museum is listed Grade II*. The forecourt wall, gates and railings to the museum are also Grade II* listed, and the two K6 telephone boxes on Kingsland Road outside the museum are listed Grade II.

=== Statue of Robert Geffrye ===
Above the Museum's former entrance is a statue of the benefactor who financed the initial almshouses (not the museum which now occupies those buildings), Robert Geffrye. Geffrye was a merchant whose wealth was partly derived from the forced labour and trading of enslaved Africans. The statue is a replica replacing the 1723 original which was moved to the new almshouses in 1912 when the building was sold. Following the refurbishment of the museum and the reorientation of the site entrance towards Hoxton Station, the side of the building with the statue is now the back of the museum.

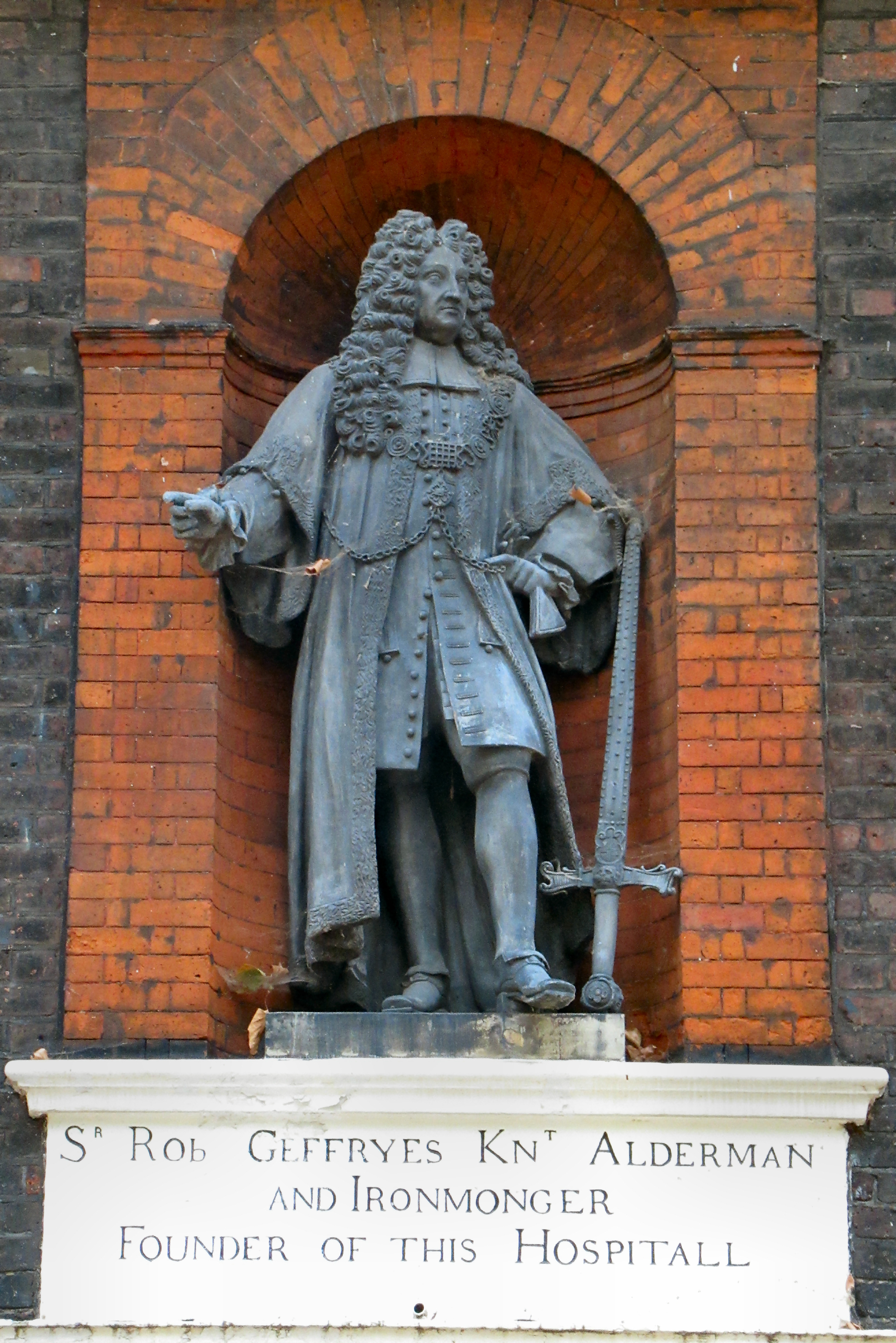
The statue of Geffrye

In July 2020, the museum held a consultation on the potential removal of the statue, with 79.4% of local people voting to take the statue down. Under pressure from the then Culture Secretary Oliver Dowden, who threatened to remove the museum's funding, the museum's board of trustees elected to "reinterpret and contextualise" the statue in its current location. There is now a sign at the foot of the building below the statue.

In November 2021, the museum published a revision to their previous position, stating that the museum "strives to be a welcoming place for all. We feel that the statue of Robert Geffrye on the front of the Museum's buildings does not promote the sense of belonging that is so important for our visitors, and fundamental to the Museum's values." They went on to state that:

As a Grade I listed building, there is legislation that the Museum must take into account in making any decision. The Museum will work closely with its stakeholders as anticipated additional guidelines are issued by the Department of Digital, Culture, Media and Sport on effective decisions concerning heritage, as well as the process around Listed Building Consent. We have been listening to many views and considering all options concerning the display of the Geffrye statue. We believe there is potential to retain the statue on site but in an alternative and less prominent space, where we can better tell the full story of the history of the buildings and Robert Geffrye's life, including his involvement in transatlantic slavery … We are confronting, challenging and learning from the uncomfortable truths of the origins of the museum buildings, to fulfil our commitment to diversity and inclusion.

== Gallery ==
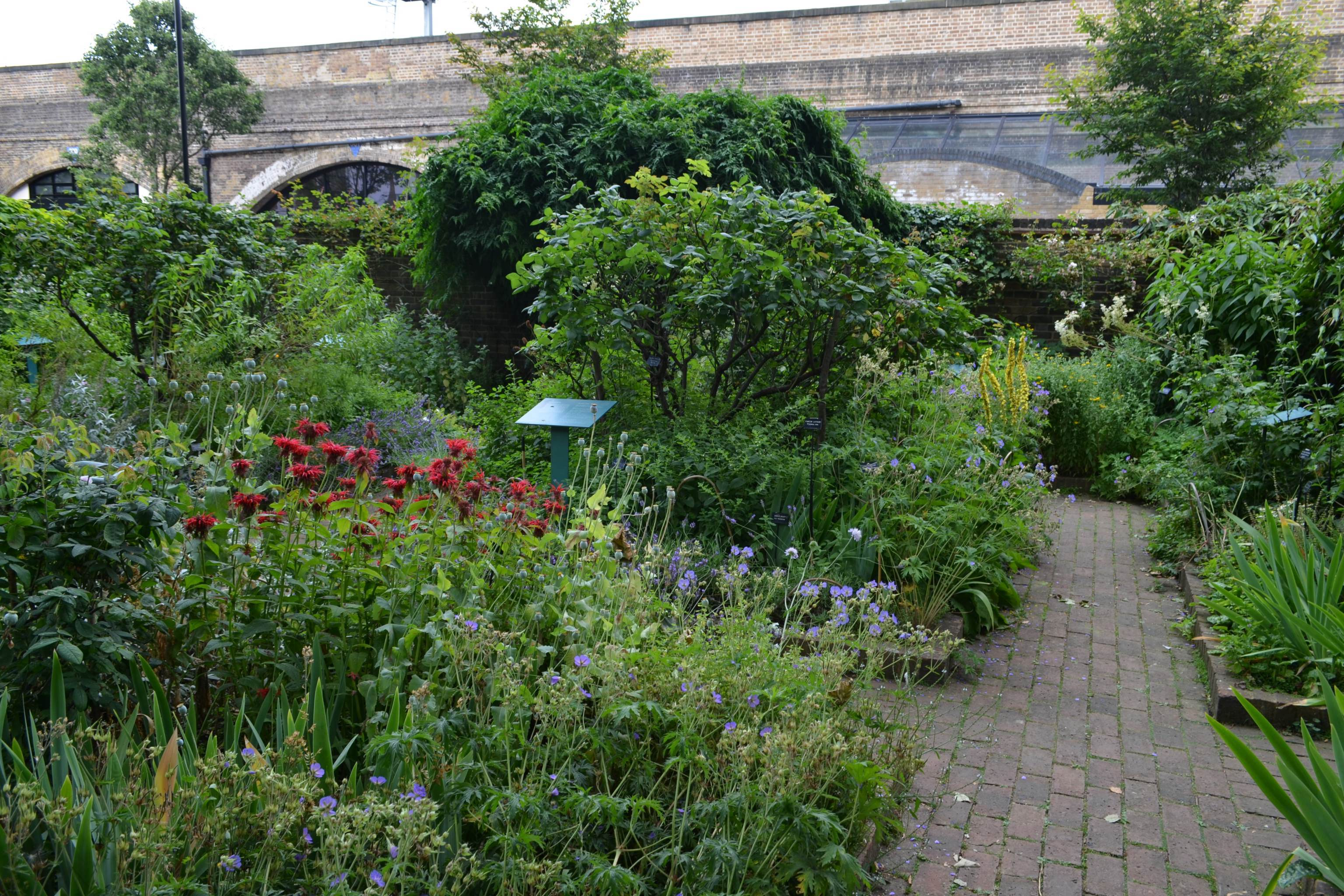
Herb garden

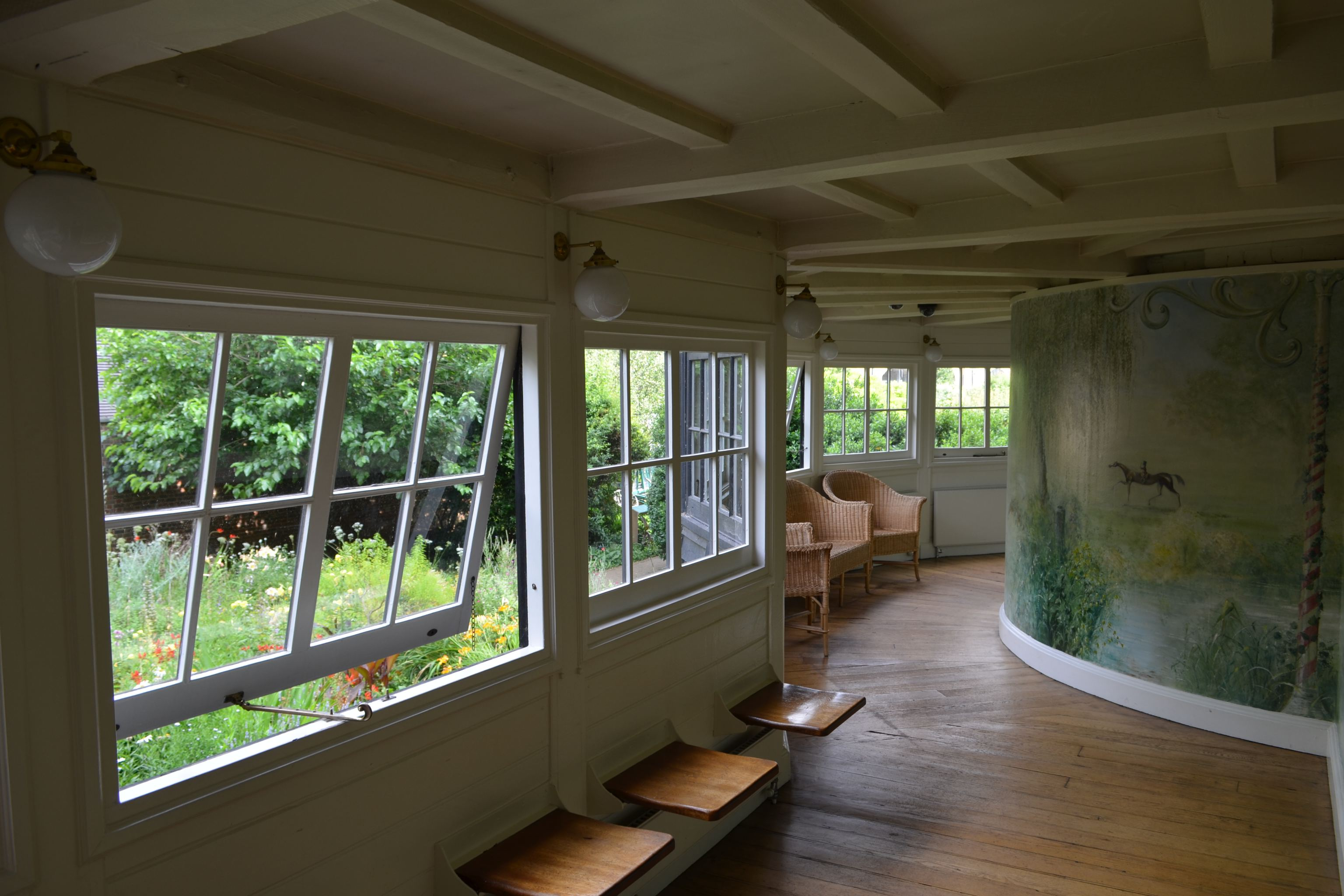
Garden reading-room

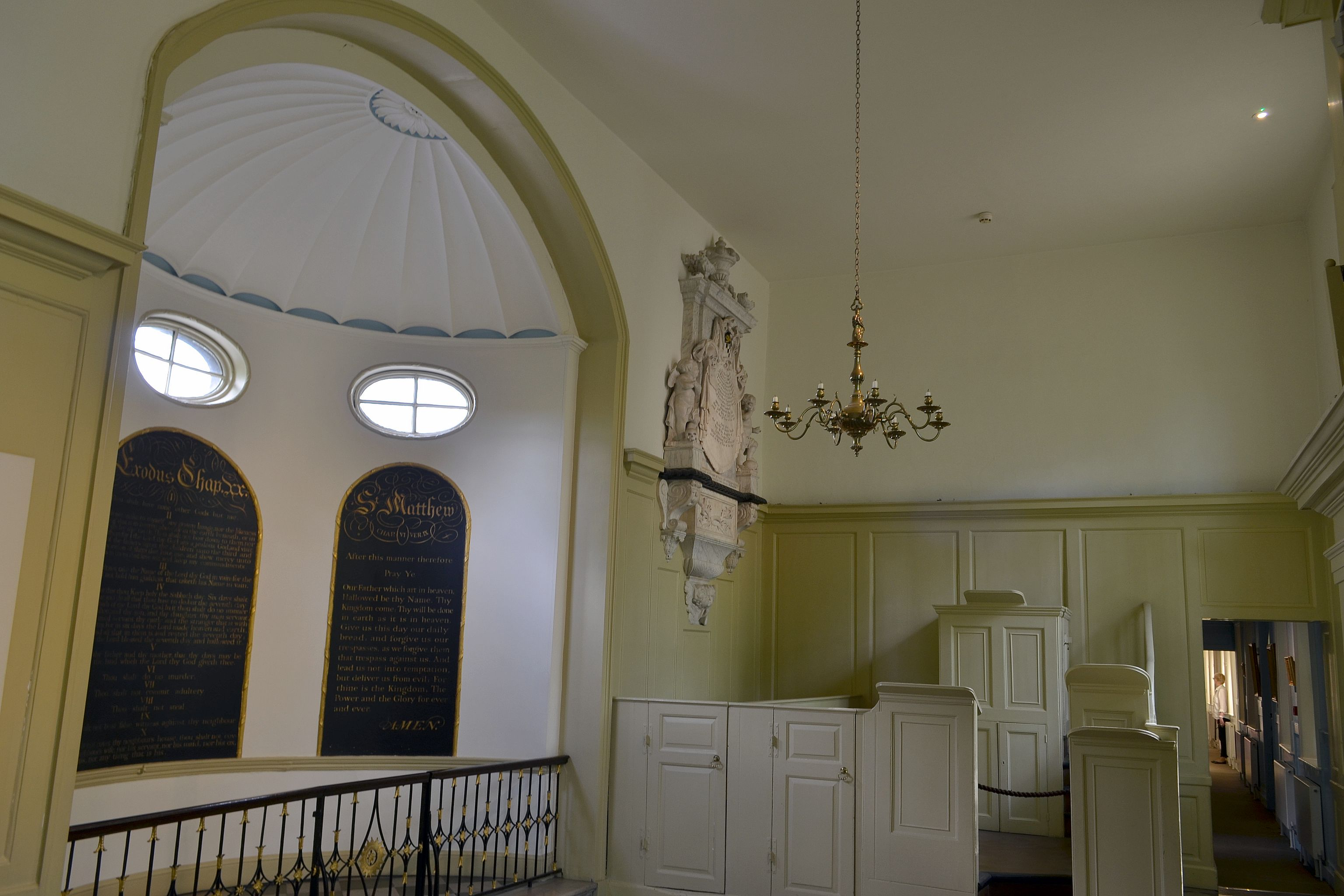
Chapel

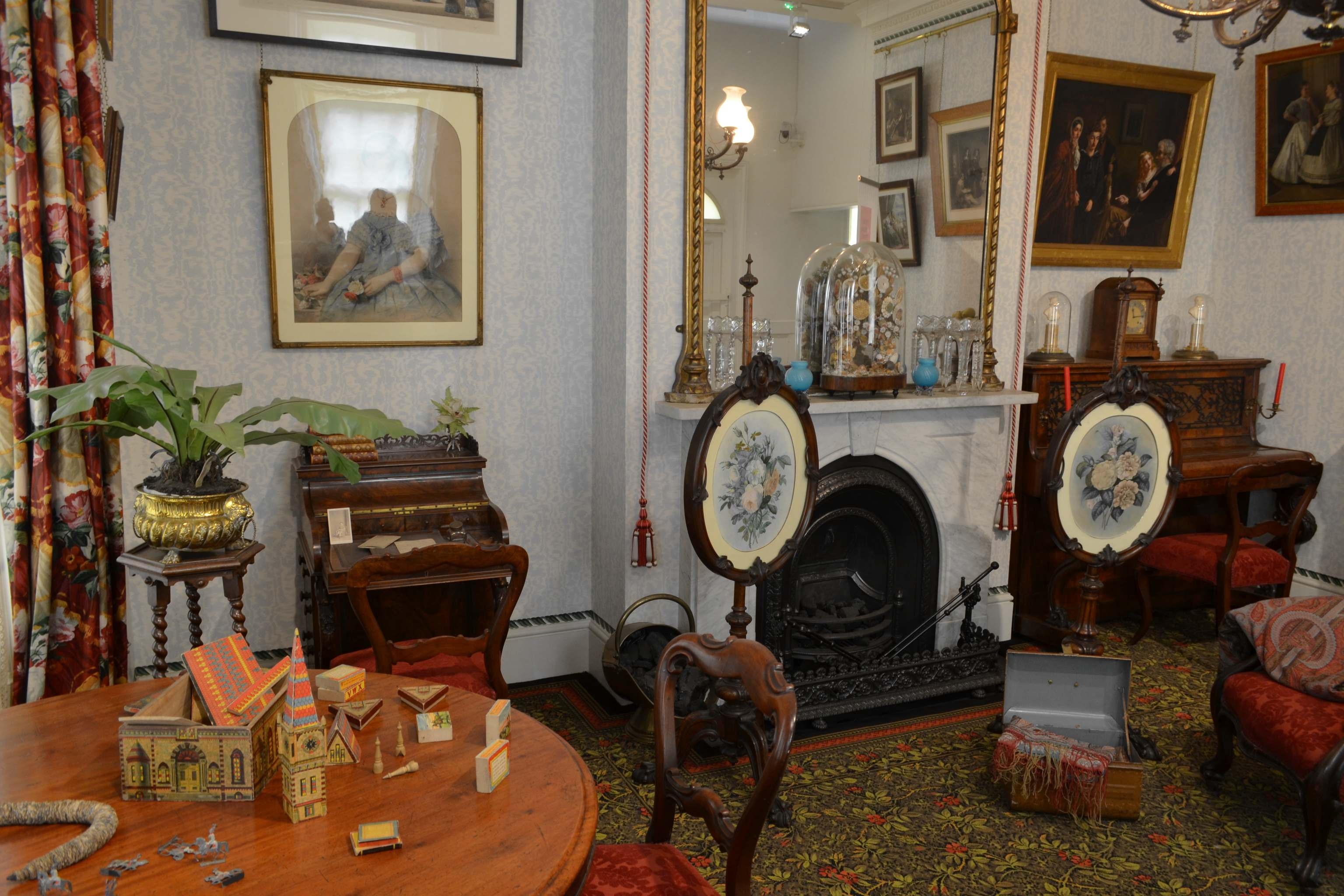
1870 drawing-room

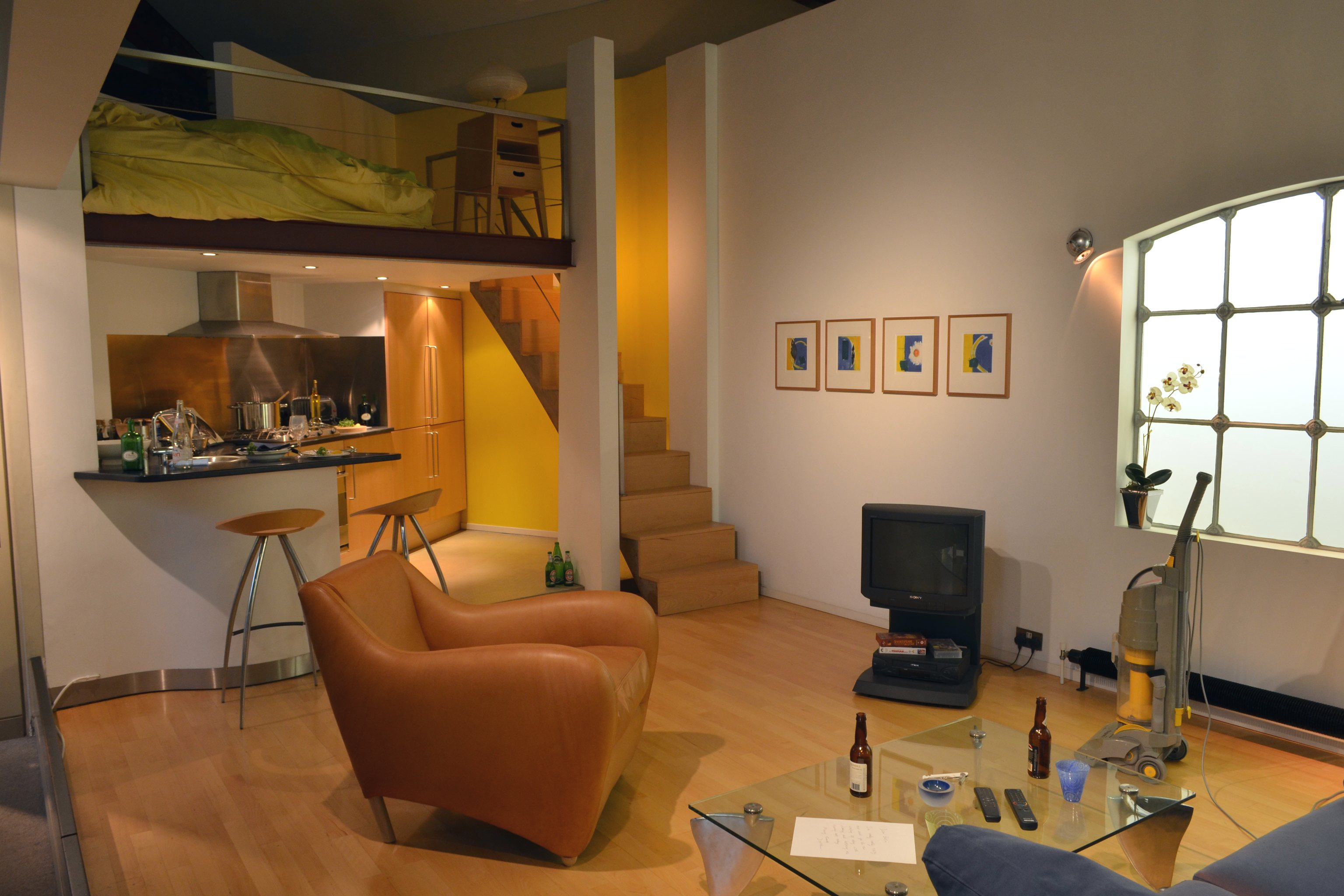
1998 loft apartment

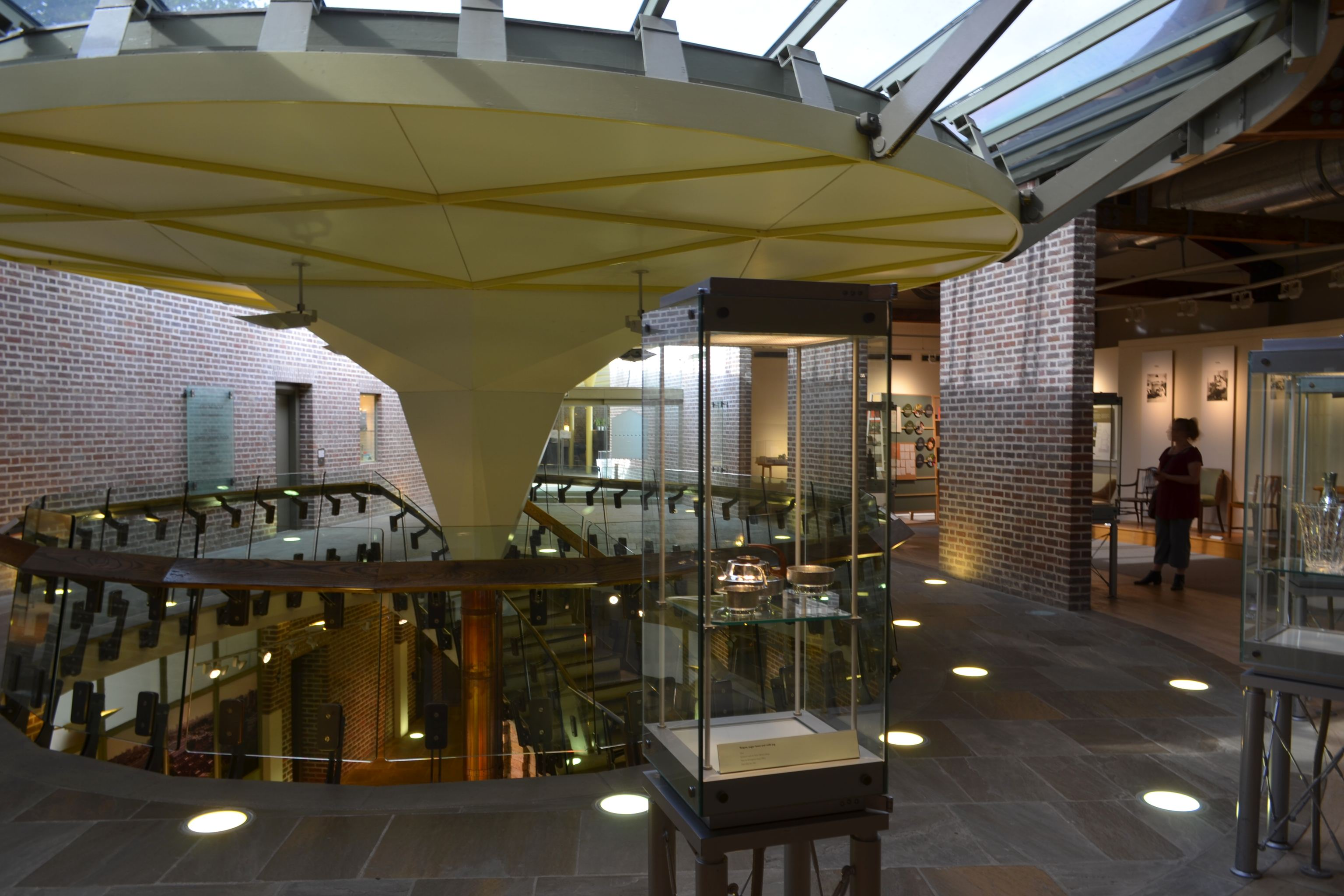
20th century galleries

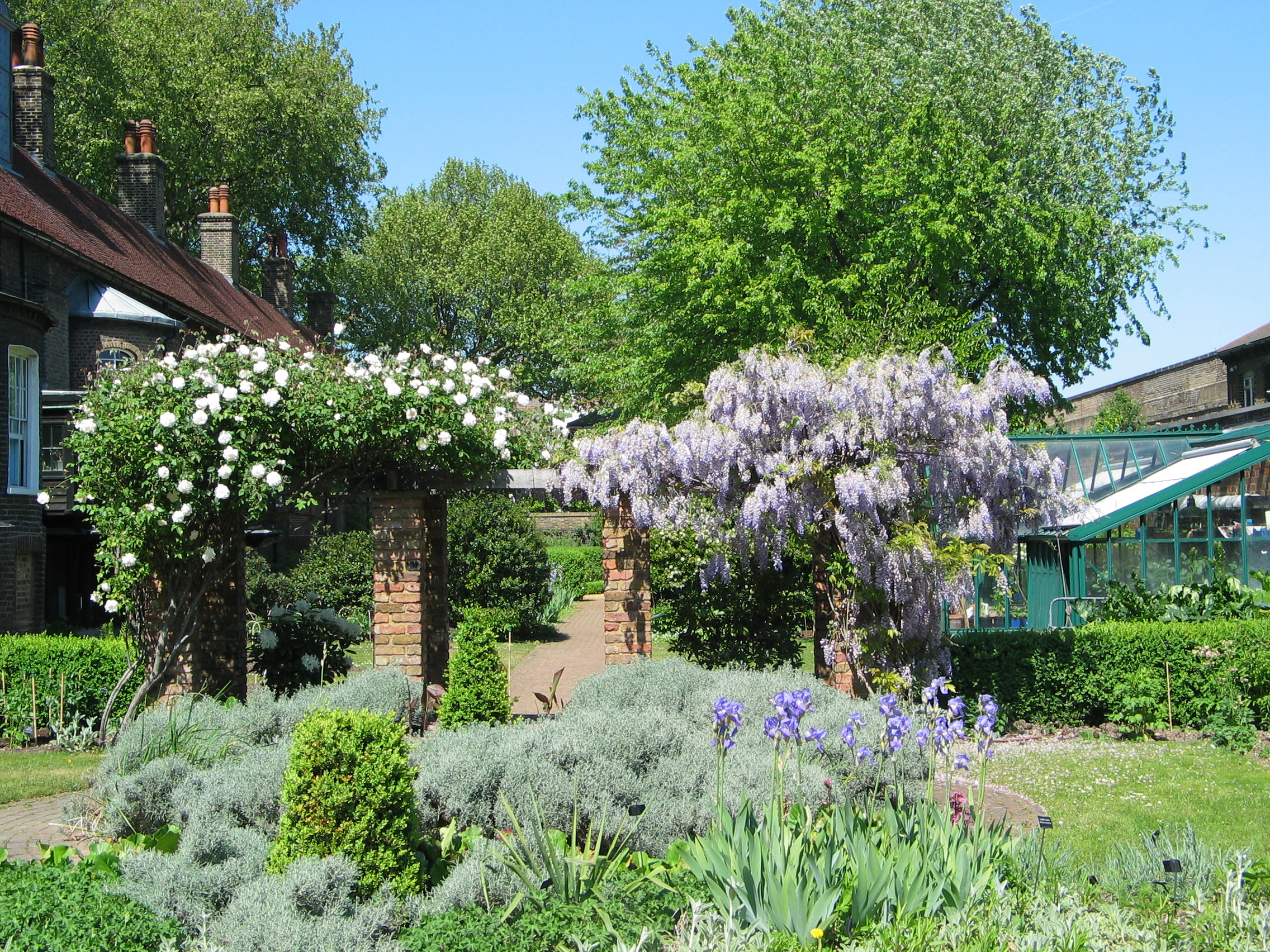
Period gardens
