= Sonia Solicari =

British curator and museum director (born 1978)

- Born: 5 July 1978 (age 48); City of London
- Education: University College London, Royal Holloway University of London, King's College London, Bishop Stopford's School at Enfield
- Occupations: Curator, Director of the Museum of the Home

Sonia Solicari (born 5 July 1978) is a British curator and museum director. She has been the CEO of the Museum of the Home, in Hoxton, London, since January 2017. Solicari is also co-director of the Centre for Studies of Home, a partnership with Queen Mary, University of London and an international hub for research on the home, past, present and future.

== Biography ==
=== Early life and education ===
Solicari was born in London to Italian parents and grew up in Enfield, north London where she attended Galliard Primary School and Bishop Stopford's School.

She completed her undergraduate studies in English Literature at Royal Holloway, University of London, followed by postgraduate degrees in Nineteenth-Century Studies at King's College London and Museum Studies at University College London.

=== Victoria and Albert Museum ===
Solicari began her career at the Victoria and Albert Museum as assistant curator of the paintings, prints and drawings collection and later of the Chinese textiles collection. In 2006 she became curator of ceramics and glass, part of the team delivering the new Ceramics Galleries which opened in 2009 and 2010.

=== Guildhall Art Gallery and London's Roman Amphitheatre ===
In 2010, Solicari was appointed Principal Curator of the Guildhall Art Gallery and the Amphitheatre (London) in the City of London. She was promoted to Head of the Gallery in 2013. Here she led the complete redisplay of the City’s art collection and launched a new public programme, including Victoriana: The Art of Revival in 2013; Ajamu X Fierce in 2014 and No Colour Bar: Black British Art in Action 1960–1990, the first exhibition of its kind in the UK, in 2015-2016. In 2015, she initiated a new collecting and programming strategy, Money, Power, Politics, working with artists to interrogate the role of London’s square mile - including Martin Parr, Polly Braden, Martha Richler (Marf) and Mark Titchner.

=== Museum of the Home ===
In 2017, Solicari became Director of Museum of the Home (formerly the Geffrye Museum of the Home) in Hoxton, east London. She succeeded David Dewing who had run the Museum for 25 years.

As Director of the Museum, Solicari has overseen an £18.6 million capital development project to expand and transform the site. The restoration of the Grade I Listed Museum buildings was undertaken by architects Wright & Wright who created 80% more space for events, collections and exhibitions.

Solicari also led the rebranding of the Museum, with the name changed to Museum of the Home to better reflect the new vision to represent home as a physical, emotional, psychological and political space and to become a more socially engaged organisation.

With Alison Blunt, Solicari is co-director of the Centre for Studies of Home, a collaboration with Queen Mary, University of London.

Solicari is a trustee of Bethlem Gallery which works with artists to lead change in health and society.
