= Robert Geffrye =

English merchant, slave trader and Lord Mayor of London

Lord Mayor of London
- In office 1685–1686
- Preceded by: Sir James Smyth
- Succeeded by: Sir John Peake

Personal details
- Born: 1613
- Died: 1703 (aged 89–90)
- Spouse: Priscilla Cropley

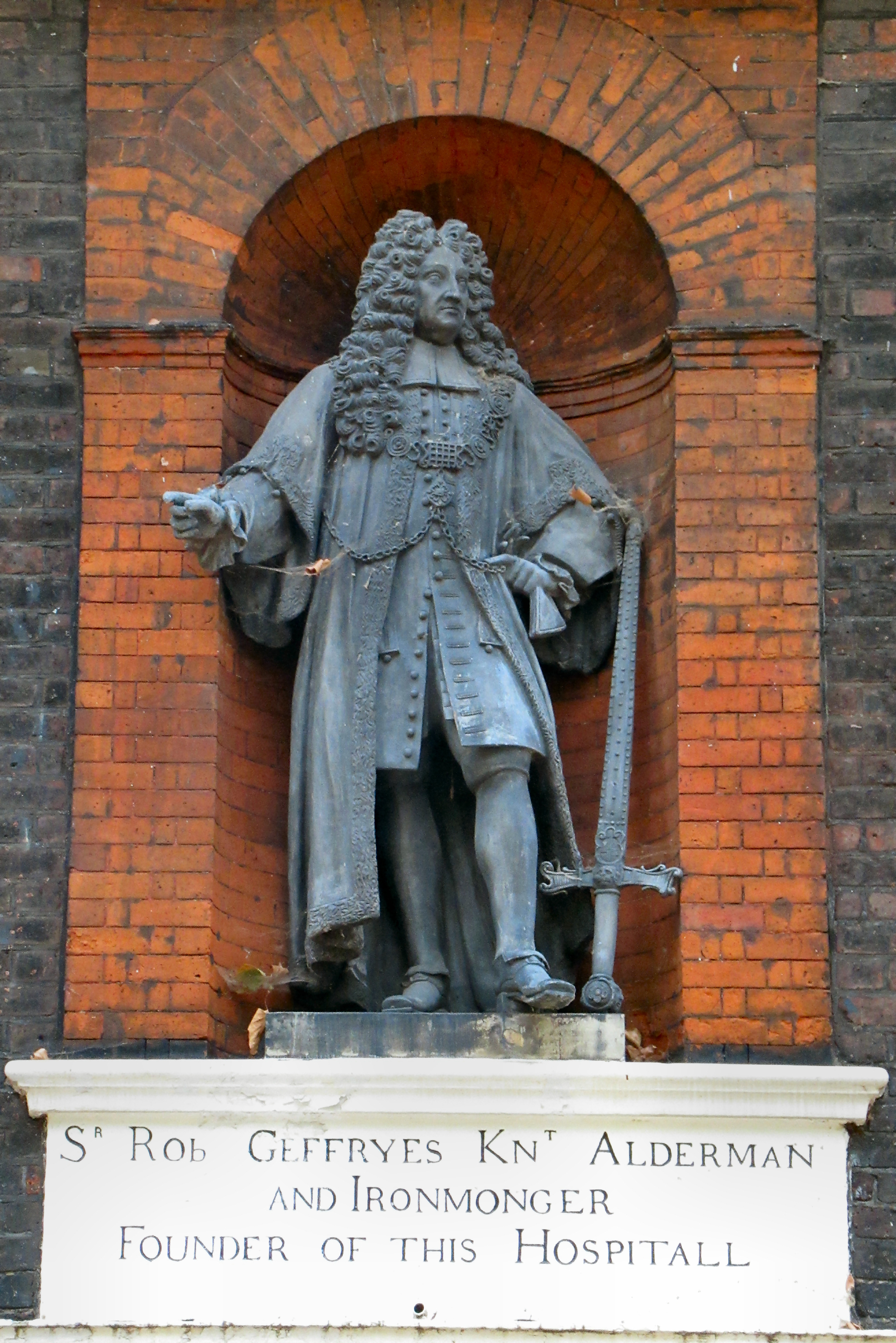
The statue of Alderman Sir Robert Geffrye at the Museum of the Home, after a 1723 original by John Nost

Sir Robert Geffrye (also spelled Geffrey or Geffery) (1613–1703) was an English merchant, slave trader, and Lord Mayor of London for 1685/86.

== Life ==
Geffrye was born to poor parents at Landrake, near Saltash, Cornwall, and moved to London, where he became an eminent East India merchant. Later residing in a townhouse on Lime Street in the City of London, he twice served as Master Ironmonger, was knighted in 1673, became Sheriff of London in 1674 and was elected Lord Mayor of London for 1685/86.

Elected President of Bridewell and Bethlehem Hospitals in March 1692–3, Geffrye was a significant trader in tobacco, part of whose investment was in the Atlantic slave trade as well as partial ownership of a slave ship, the China Merchant.

Married in 1651 to Priscilla (died 1676), daughter of Luke Cropley, a City lawyer and brother of Sir John Cropley, Sir Robert and Lady Geffrye had no children.

On his death Geffrye left about £10,000 divided in legacies to friends, relatives, hospitals and clergymen's widows, and in establishing certain trusts under the charge of the Worshipful Company of Ironmongers. A service was to be provided twice daily in the church of St. Dionis Backchurch, a school to be maintained at Landrake, and the poor of St Erney and Landrake to be relieved. The remainder was dedicated to 14 almshouses, mainly for widows of ironmongers, being constructed in 1715 at Shoreditch. These buildings were sold in 1910 and now house the Museum of the Home (formerly the Geffrye Museum), which has displays scenes of domestic life from 1600 to the present day. New almshouses were built at Mottingham in Kent, sold in 1972 to the Greater London Council. Sir Robert Geffrye's Trust continues to maintain almshouse in Hampshire – at Basingstoke that opened in 1984, also being refurbished and reopened in 2023. They give sheltered housing to 65 retired people of limited means. There is also a Sir Robert Geffrye's School in the village of Landrake, Cornwall.

== See also ==
- Ironmongers' Company
