= Bishop Stopford's School =

Coordinates: 51.657°N 0.055°W

Location
- Brick Lane; Enfield, London, EN1 3PU; England

Information
- Type: Voluntary aided secondary school
- Motto: Animus noster dei gloria
- Religious affiliation: Church of England
- Established: 1967; 59 years ago
- Founder: The Bishop of London, the Right Reverend Robert Stopford
- Local authority: Enfield
- Oversight: Diocese of London
- Department for Education URN: 102052 Tables
- Ofsted: Reports
- Chairman of Governors: Revd Dr Edward Dowler
- Head teacher: Tammy Day
- Chaplain: Jonathan Seabrook
- Teaching staff: 100+
- Gender: Mixed
- Age: 11 to 18
- Enrolment: 761
- Houses: Coventry; St. Georges; King Alfred's; Temple's; Waltham; Trinity
- Colours: Black, navy blue, grey and white
- Publication: The Stopford Messenger
- Alumni: Old Stopfordians
- Website: www.bishopstopfords.enfield.sch.uk

Bishop Stopford's School, commonly known as Bishop Stopford's, or (simply) just Bishop's, is a voluntary aided co-educational secondary school specialising in mathematics, computing and engineering, with a sixth form. It is a London Diocesan Church of England school with worship in a relatively High Church Anglo-Catholic tradition. It is in Brick Lane, Enfield, near Enfield Highway, Greater London, England.

== Overview ==
Bishop Stopford's has about 920 pupils aged 11 to 19. In 2004 the school received an award for mathematics and computing and in 2008 engineering specialist status.

=== Key Stage 3 ===
At Key Stage 3 pupils follow the same subjects for years 7–9. All pupils start to take French in Year 7.

=== GCSE ===
In Year 9 pupils can choose what subjects they wish to take for their GCSEs. All pupils take maths, science (either two GCSEs' worth of combined science or three separate GCSEs in biology, chemistry and physics), English language, English literature, religious studies and Spanish. All students continue to take lessons in physical education and PSHE, but these are not mandatory GCSE subjects.

=== Sixth form ===
Pupils may take a 1-year BTEC course in either OCR business studies or BTEC art and design, or AS/A2 levels.

== History ==
After almost a century of attempts by the Church to found a church secondary school in Enfield, Bishop Stopford's was founded on St. Polycarp's Day 1967 and opened its doors to its first pupils on 7 September 1967. Its founder was the then Bishop of London, the Right Reverend Robert Wright Stopford. The school was founded to provide an Anglican church school for the children of Enfield, who at that time had several Church primary schools but no Church secondary school. The school was established in the buildings of the old Suffolk's Secondary Modern School.

The school hit the headlines in February 1990 when three rottweiler dogs escaped from a nearby property and entered the school premises and attacked and injured several pupils.

The former Heads of Bishop Stopford's have been Geoffrey Roberts from 1967 to 1988, Brian Robin Pickard from 1988 to 2001, Bridget Sarah Evans from 2001 to 2008, and Jim Owen from 2009 to 2012.

Tammy Day (Current Deputy Head /Senior Mistress) was appointed as Acting Head for a term until Paul Woods assumed office in January 2013. During this time Sandra Melhuish (Assistant Head) was appointed as Acting Senior Mistress/Deputy Head and Russell Dean (Assistant Head) was appointed Senior Master/Deputy Head. Woods assumed office as Head Master in January 2013 and resigned in 2015 leaving Day as acting Head. Day was appointed permanent Head in February 2017.

== Choir Form ==
The Choir Form was founded in 1973 and takes boys and girls from all six Houses from year 7 to the sixth form. (Year 7 pupils may volunteer for the Junior Choir.) While remaining members of their Houses, pupils in the Choir Form attend registration together, and sing in assembly, hymn practice, choir practice and compline together. They attend a residential singing week every year, which has been at Bradwell on Sea, Seasalter, Walsingham, and Winchester. In 2004-5 the Choir Form was renamed the Music Form to incorporate a wider range of musical abilities and the modernisation of school worship.

== Gallery ==
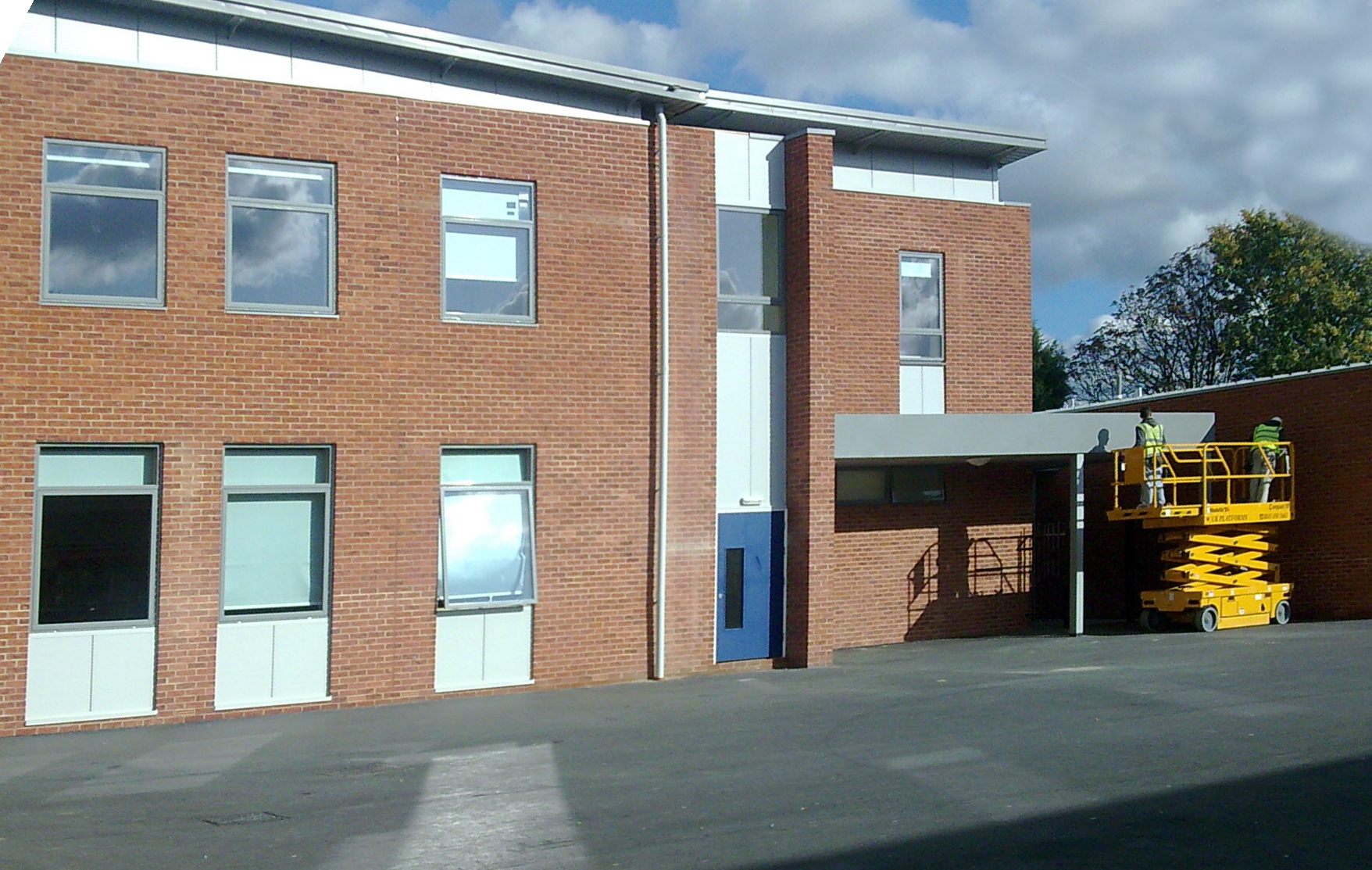
Modern English and Engineering Block

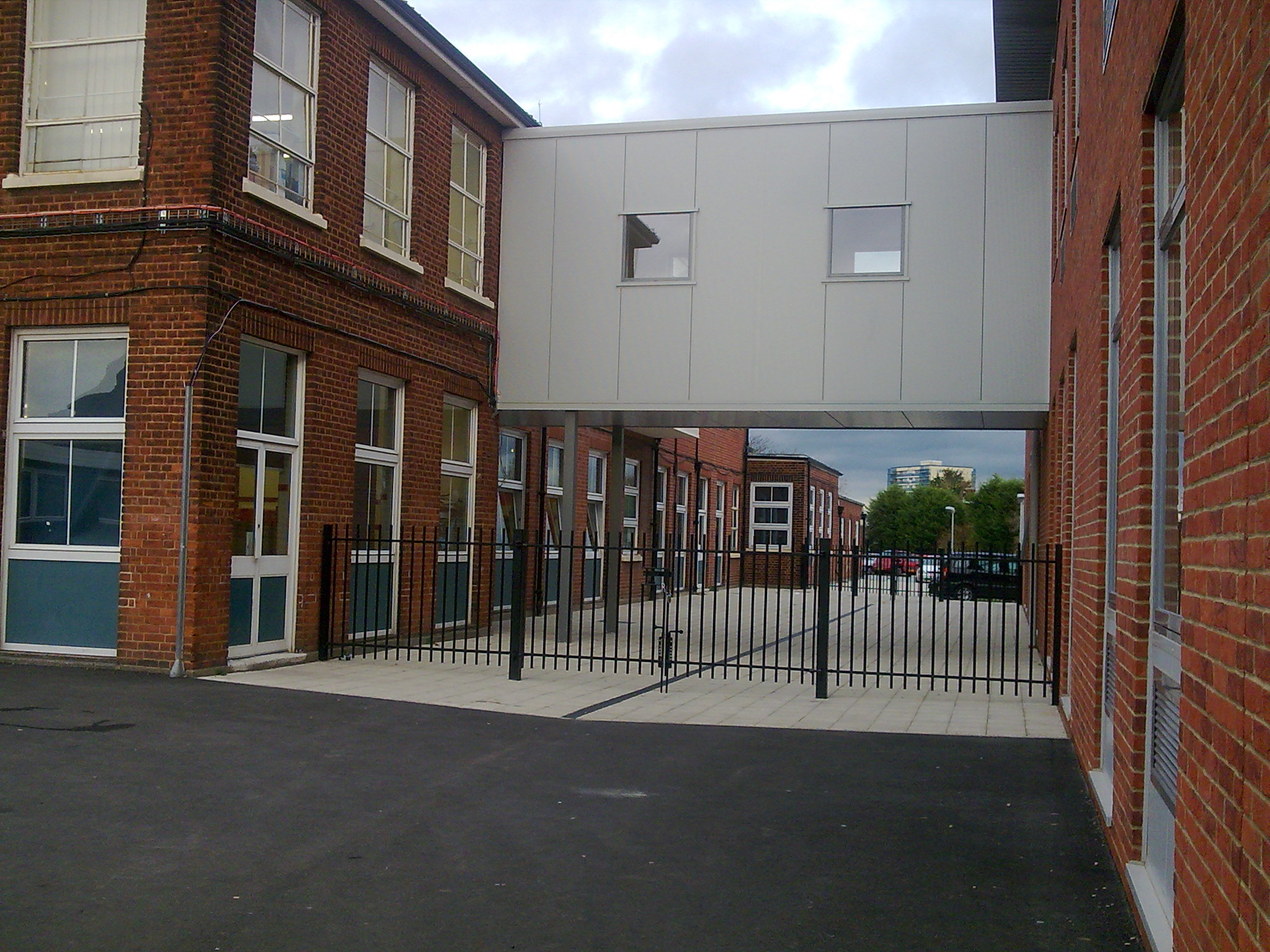
link bridge from east wing to east wing extension; English and Engineering

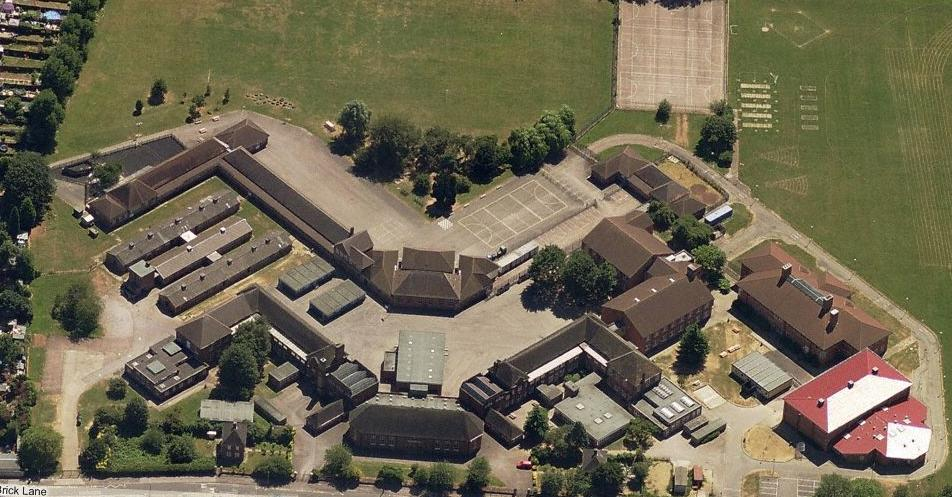
A view across the yard, before the school's modernisation

Sports Hall

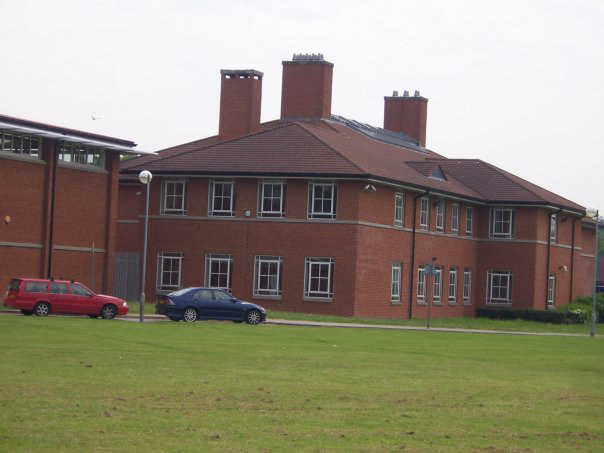
Jubilee; where science lessons take place

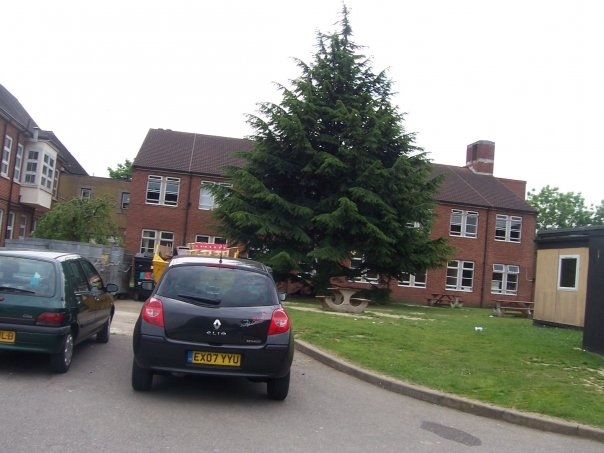
Orchard; the westernmost building of the school

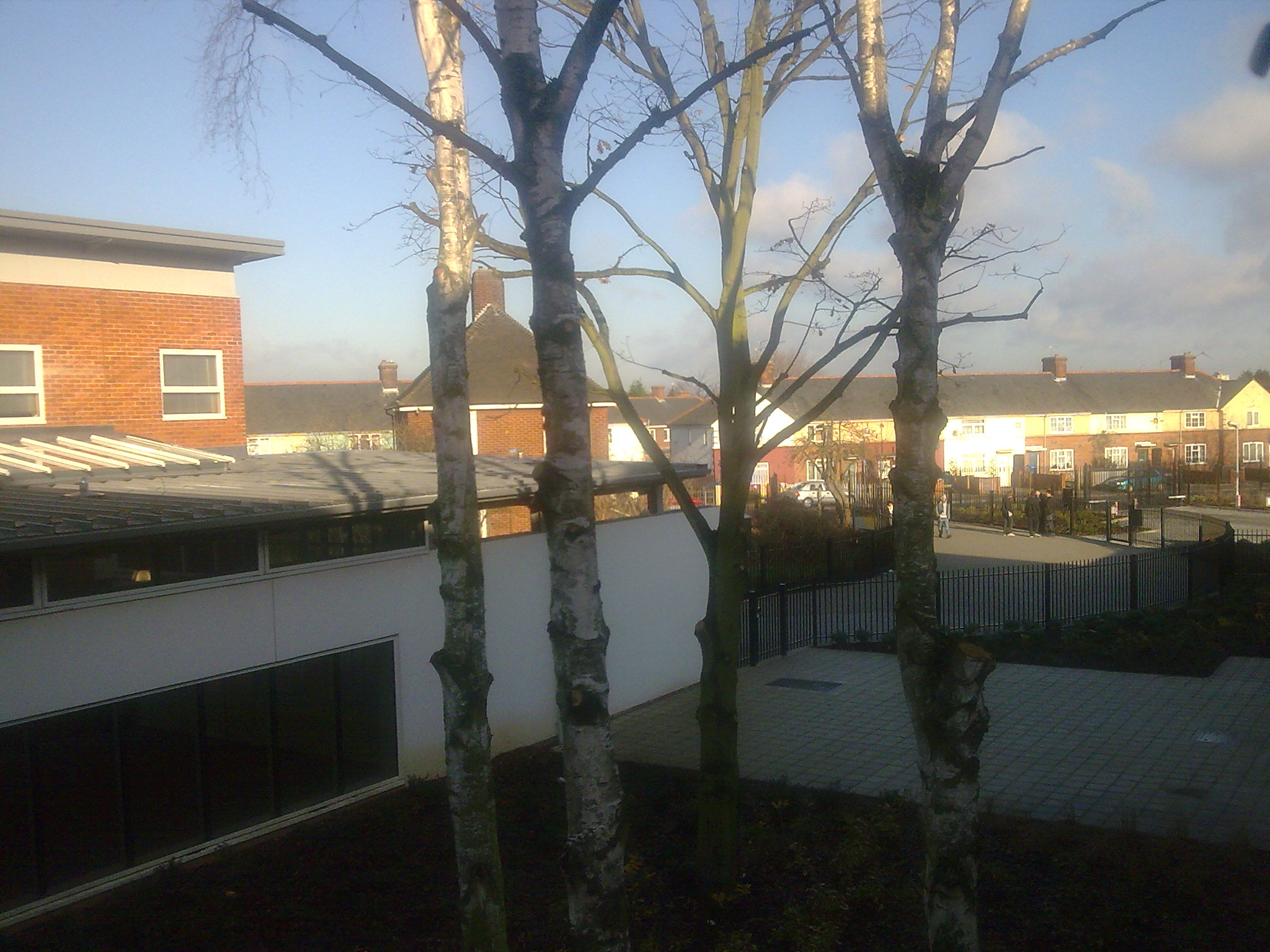
Admin Block as seen from the 2nd Floor East wing Corridor

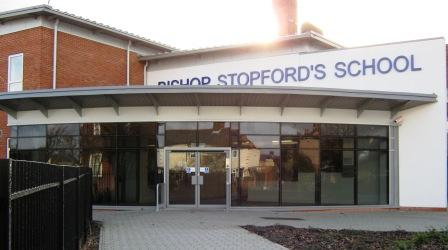
School Office Exterior, with Bishop Stopford's livery

== Assembly ==
All pupils must attend one assembly a week, normally as a year with their forms . The Sixth Form has its own assembly on Fridays.

The assembly at Bishop Stopford's School begins with organ music. A House prefect from one of the Houses whose assembly is being held then leads in the procession of all the prefects from the two Houses. Following the prefects are the senior staff, normally the Deputy Head Master and the Deputy Head Mistress. Behind the Deputy Heads comes the Chaplain. who is then followed by the Head's prefects, who are followed by the Head. Gowns are still worn but assemblies are now less formal and less religious than previously.

== The School Chapel ==
The school chapel was formerly a small room on the first floor of the West Wing of the school, but is now in the vestibule accessed from the corridor between the East and West Wings, by the great hall. The Eucharist is said in the chapel every morning as is the Prayer For All Stopfordians. This is a special prayer for all those who have a connection with the school, living or dead.

The stage contains the great altar, said to be the largest mobile altar in the Diocese of London, which was borrowed by the Oxford Movement for use in the Royal Albert Hall in its 150th anniversary celebrations. The Altar is covered by one of four different Altar cloths of appropriate colours for the Church year, made by various teachers and pupils of the school.

== School Organ ==
The school's pipe organ was made from the remains of a church organ salvaged from Sandylands Methodist Church in Morecambe, Lancashire. Bought for £400, the organ is now insured for several hundreds of thousands of pounds. A new console was added during its installation, and additional pipes were bought. The case was rebuilt and new wiring and electric bellows installed. The motor for the blower was purchased from the Trinity College of Music. As with many cathedral organs, the dummy pipes at the front of the organ are purely decorative.

Several notable organists have given recitals on this instrument, including Carlo Curley, Peter Hurford, Stephen Darlington, Thomas Trotter, and John Scott.

== Traditions ==
The school is noted for its traditions, many of which date from the time of the first Head Master.

=== The School Pilgrimage ===
Every year pupils from Years 7 to 10 undertake an eleven-mile (seventeen kilometre) sponsored walk known as the School Pilgrimage along the canal tow-path of the River Lea Navigation from Ware to Enfield Lock. Sums raised have contributed substantially to the school foundation fund. In 2009 the route was blocked and the Pilgrimage was completed by proxy (as has always been stated on the sponsor forms) a fortnight later.

=== The Beating of the Bounds ===
Every year, on Ascension Day, a group of pupils used to go round the boundaries of the school striking selected areas with special whips. This was based on the Anglo-Saxon practice of beating the bounds. This has since been modernised, but a special Ascension Day assembly is still held, remembering the practice.

=== Gowns ===
The school is notable as one of few in Britain still to require its prefects to wear gowns. In 2003, however, the new Head instituted blazers, with gowns now reserved for special occasions. The gowns vary in colour but all take the form of a sleeveless robe. House Prefects wear grey gowns, School Prefects wear royal blue and Senior Prefects navy blue. House Captains also wear navy blue. The most senior rank of prefects, the Senior VI, wear navy blue Senior Prefect gowns with a coloured stripe to signify their rank. The Deputy Head Boy and Girl have a thin purple stripe and the Head Boy and Girl have a thick purple stripe. The most senior and oldest rank of prefect, the Head Master's Prefects, have a thick red stripe on their gown.

=== Forgiveness ===
Forgiveness was an alternative to corporal punishment. An offending pupil was offered a choice between receiving a caning and performing "forgiveness". A pupil who chose forgiveness was made to carry out arduous tasks or physical exercise for approximately one hour, after which he was said to be 'forgiven'. To make the choice, the miscreant was presented with a pair of blue and a pair of black shorts. If he opted to be caned, he would select the blue shorts. If he chose the black shorts he would receive forgiveness. .

With the outlawing of corporal punishment in state schools in England in 1987, the "trial by shorts" procedure became defunct. In recent years Forgiveness has become less and less common.

Although corporal punishment is no longer practised, for a while the school displayed the old canes in the Great Hall and the Head Master's study.

=== The School Roll ===
Since the school was founded, every new pupil and teacher at the school has signed his or her name on the School Roll. Originally a single roll of paper, kept in a leather cylinder, it has now had to have additional paper added to the first roll and two new separate rolls (and cylinders) made to accommodate new names. The roll used to be carried in the procession every morning in Assembly, but since there are now three cylinders, on special occasions one of the three cylinders is carried to signify the roll's importance in the life of the school.

== Notable staff ==
Eddie Baily taught PE at the school.

== Old Stopfordians ==
- Jason Banton, footballer
- Paul Barber (soccer administrator)
- Anton Blackwood, footballer, Antigua and Barbuda national team
- Shy FX, musician, jungle drum'n'bass pioneer
- Russell Kane, comedian and author
- Jonathan Obika, footballer
- Sonia Solicari, museum curator
- Ruth Symes, children's author
- Chijindu Ujah athlete
- Teddy Wilson (sprinter)
