= A Soldier's Friend =

2014 children's novel written by Megan Rix

- Author: Megan Rix
- Illustrator: Richard Jones
- Language: English
- Subject: Wartime
- Genre: Children's
- Publisher: Puffin Books
- Publication date: 2014
- Publication place: England
- Media type: Paperback and eBook
- Pages: 316
- ISBN: 978-0-14-135190-2
- OCLC: 872701578

A Soldier's Friend is a 2014 children's novel written by Megan Rix and published by Puffin Books.

== Plot ==
The story follows the friendship of a dog, Sammy, and a cat, Mouser, during the First World War.

== Reception ==
The novel was well received. "Lottie Longshanks", reviewing for The Guardian, stated that "the book is well written and easy to read" and that "it brings that time in history to life so vividly." Julia Eccleshare, writing for website 'Love Reading 4 Kids', called it an "exciting and touching story".

Penguin Schools, along with website TeachItPrimary, provide a pack of activities based on the book to use as a teaching resource in primary schools.
