= Landrake =

Village in Cornwall, England

Coordinates: 50.4225°N 4.2896°W

Landrake: Cornish: Lannergh
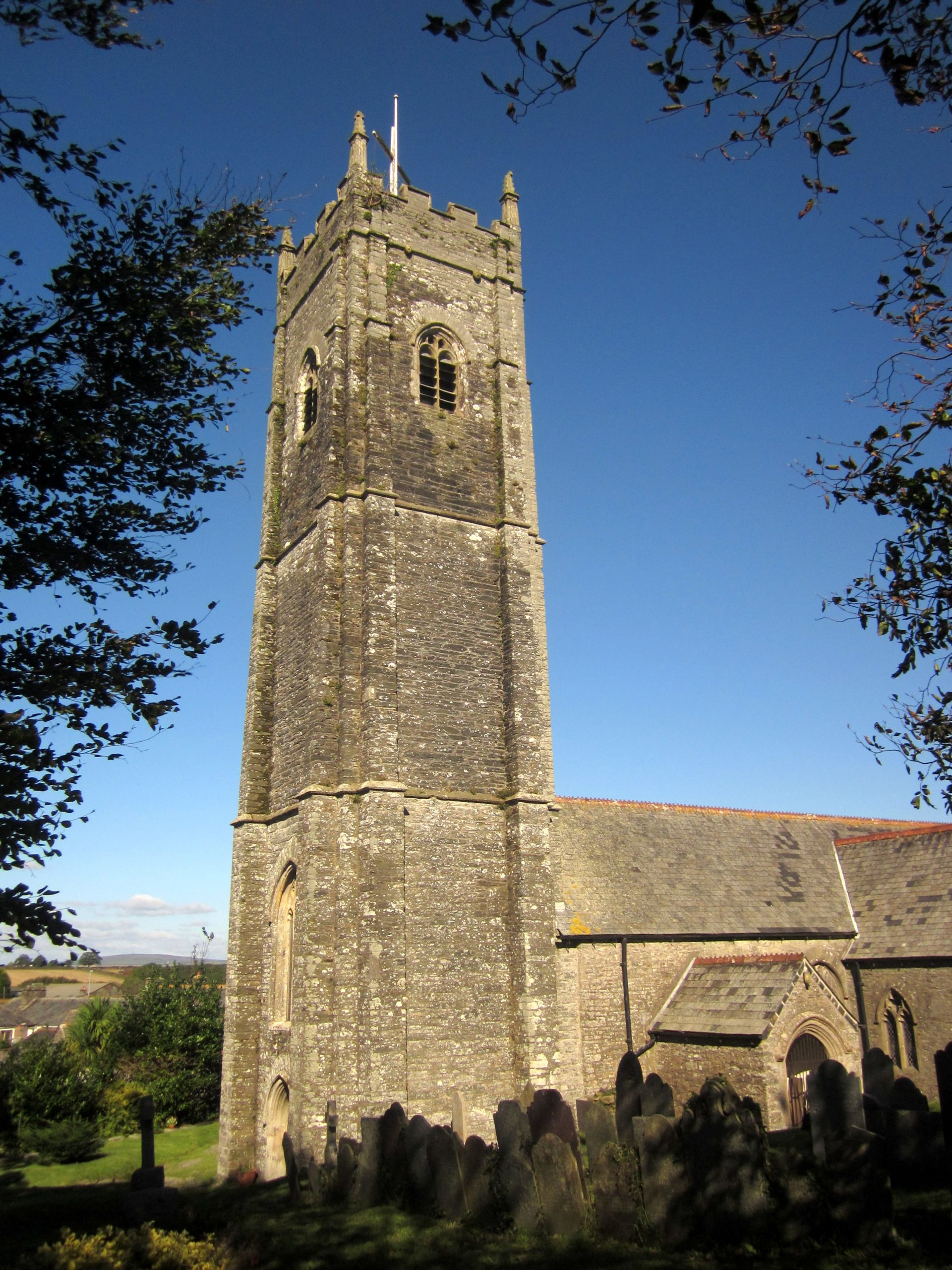
- St Michael's Church, Landrake

- Location within Cornwall
- Population: 1,082 (2011 UK census)
- OS grid reference: SX374606
- Civil parish: Landrake with St Erney
- Shire county: Cornwall
- Region: South West
- Country: England
- Sovereign state: United Kingdom
- Post town: SALTASH
- Postcode district: PL12
- Dialling code: 01752
- Police: Devon and Cornwall
- Fire: Cornwall
- Ambulance: South Western
- UK Parliament: South East Cornwall

Landrake (Cornish: Lannergh) is a village in southeast Cornwall, England. It is situated approximately three miles (5 km) west of Saltash, in the civil parish of Landrake with St Erney (where the population of the 2011 census was included.). The A38 road passes through the village.

Landrake has a post office, a shop, a pub named the Bullers Arms, and Sir Robert Geffery's School, a primary school. The school takes its name from Landrake-born Sir Robert Geffery who, in 1704, bequeathed money to set up a trust to educate children of the parish.

== St Michael's Church ==
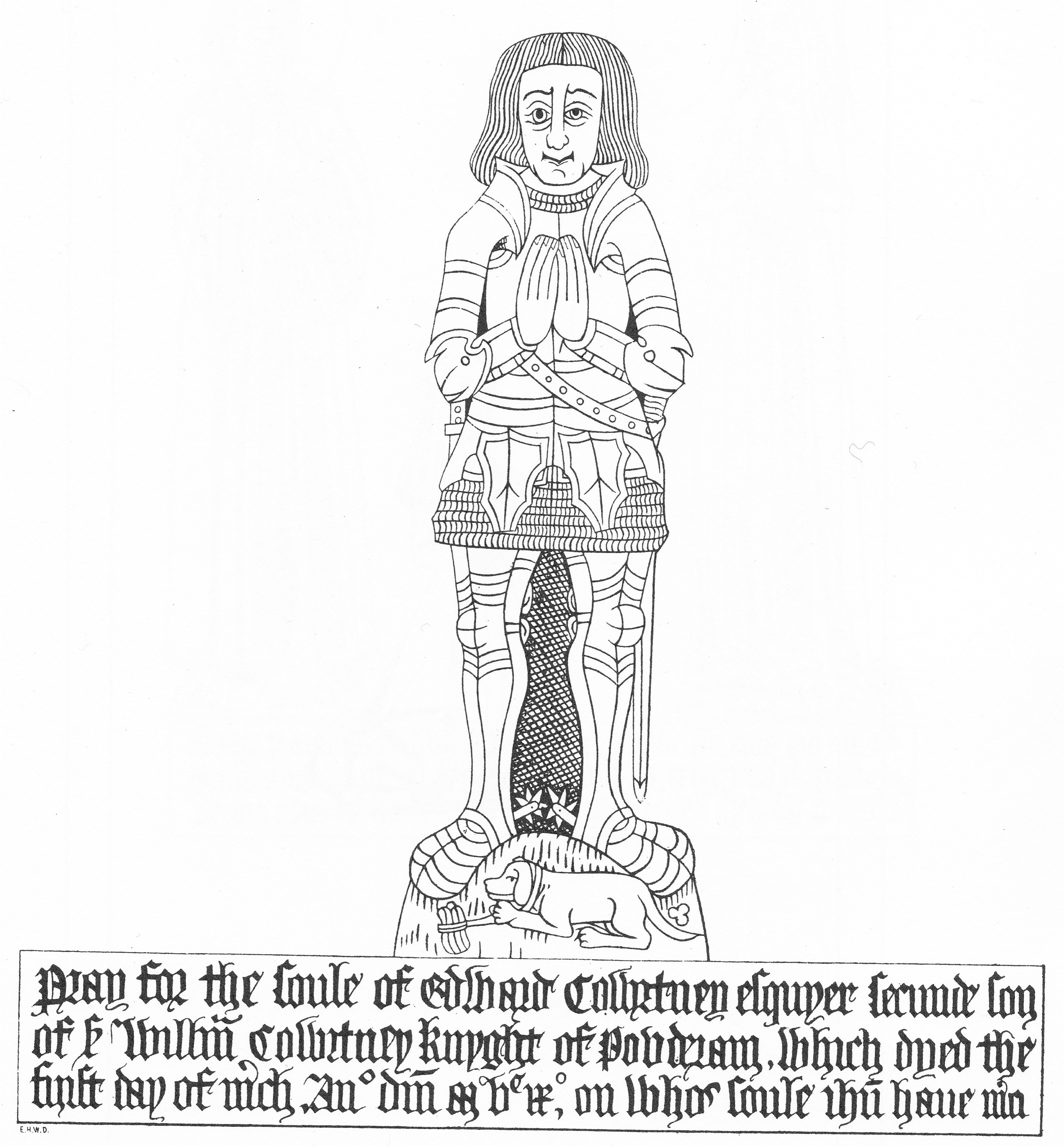
Monumental brass of Edward Courtenay (d. 1509/10), Landrake Church

Landrake Church is dedicated to St Michael. It stands on a hill and the tower is 100 ft high. Parts of the building date to the Anglo-Saxon era. The earliest recorded reference to a church at Landrake dates from 1018, when King Cnut granted land to Bishop Burhwold, after which it was to pass to St Germans Priory. The gift included the parish of Landrake with its chapel of St Erney; these continued to be held by the monastery after the see was moved to Devon. In 1269 a vicarage was established whereby the vicar received the small tithes of Landrake and St Erney and the great tithe was kept by the monastery.

The church was largely rebuilt and enlarged in the late 14th and 15th centuries, when the nave and chancel were altered and the west tower, north aisle, north porch, and south transept were added. The chancel contains several memorials, including a brass to Edward Courtenay, Lord of Wotton (d. 1509), and a pair of slate monuments dated 1607 to Nicholas Mylls and his wife.

The church was designated a Grade I listed building in 1968.

== Notable people ==
- Francis Rous (1579–1659), an English politician, prominent Puritan and Provost of Eton. For some years he lived in Landrake in seclusion and occupied himself with theological studies.
- Sir Robert Geffrye (1613–1703), merchant, slave trader, and Lord Mayor of London for 1685/86.
- William Beale (1784–1854), an English composer and baritone.

== See also ==
- People from Landrake
