= List of fellows of the Royal Society S, T, U, V =

About 8,000 fellows have been elected to the Royal Society since its inception in 1660. Below is a list of people who are or were Fellow or Foreign Member of the Royal Society. The date of election to the fellowship follows the name. Dates in brackets relate to an award or event associated with the person. The Society maintains a complete online list. This list is complete up to and including 2019.

List of fellows and foreign members of the Royal Society
A, B, C	D, E, F	G, H, I	J, K, L	M, N, O	P, Q, R	S, T, U, V	W, X, Y, Z

== List of fellows ==
=== S ===
Name	Election date	Notes
Joseph Sabine	1799-11-07	1770 – 24 January 1837
Edward Sabine	1818-04-16	14 October 1788 – 26 June 1883
Giulio Sacchetti	1740-11-06	fl 1740–1757
Subir Sachdev	2023-07-14	
Christopher Tadeusz Czeslaw Sachrajda	1996-03-14	
Leo Sachs	1997-05-15	
Charles Sackville, 6th Earl of Dorset	1699-01-11	24 January 1638 – 29 January 1706
Richard Sackville, 5th Earl of Dorset	1665-05-03	16 September 1622 – 27 August 1677
Michael Thomas Sadler	1832-06-09	3 January 1780 – 29 July 1835
Peter John Sadler	2005-05-26	
Philip Geoffrey Saffman	1988-03-17	
Georges-Louis Le Sage	1775-06-01	13 June 1724 – 9 November 1803
Meghnad N Saha	1927-05-12	? 6 October 1893 – 16 February 1956
Birbal Sahni	1936-05-07	14 November 1891 – 10 April 1949
Helen Ruth Saibil	2006-05-18	
David Sainsbury	2008-07-10	24 October 1940 Honorary member
Paul de Saint Hyacinthe	1728-10-24	24 September 1684 – 1746
Peter Sainthill	1735-02-06	8 October 1775
Muhammad Abdus Salam	1959-03-19	29 January 1926 – 21 November 1996, Pakistan
Gavin Salam	2017-05-05	
Redcliffe Nathan Salaman	1935-05-16	12 September 1874 – 12 June 1955
Albert Henri de Salengre	1719-11-05	? 1694 – 27 July 1723
Henry Jerome de Salis	1770-05-03	1740 – 2 May 1810
Jerome de Salis, 2nd Count de Salis	1741-03-19	1709–1794
Jerome de Salis, 4th Count de Salis-Soglio	1808-12-15	1771 – 2 October 1836
Richard Anthony Salisbury	1787-03-15	1761–1829
Edward James Salisbury	1933-05-11	16 April 1886 – 10 November 1978
Ekhard Karl Hermann Salje	1996-03-14	
Claude Sallier	1744-05-10	4 April 1685 – 9 January 1761
George Salmon	1863-06-04	25 September 1819 – 22 January 1904
George Salt	1956-03-15	12 December 1903 – 17 February 2003 Entomologist, Cambridge
Henry Salt	1812-11-26	14 June 1780 – ? 30 October 1827
Henry Hyde Salter	1856-06-05	1823 – 31 August 1871
Samuel James Augustus Salter	1863-06-04	1825–28 February 1897
Milton Robert James Salton	1979-03-15	
Oliver Salusbury	1681-04-06	fl 1673–1687
Giuseppe Angelo Saluzzo, Conte di Menusiglio	1760-02-21	2 October 1734 – 16 June 1810 Chemist
Joseph Salvador	1759-03-15	fl 1759
Giovanni Francesco Mauro Melchiorre Salvemini di Castiglione	1745-05-30	1708–1791
Osbert Salvin	1873-06-12	25 February 1835 – 1 June 1898
Antonio Maria Salvini	1716-04-05	1653 – ? 17 May 1729
John Roy Sambles	2002-05-09	Professor of Experimental Physics at the University of Exeter
Joseph Frank Sambrook	1985-03-21	
Jeremy Sambrooke	1681-04-27	27 April 1705
Ralph Allen Sampson	1903-06-11	25 June 1866 – 7 November 1939
Thomas Sampson	1811-07-04	? 1767 – 31 March 1839 Clergyman
Bernhard Samuelson	1881-06-02	22 November 1820 – 10 May 1905
Alec Sand	1944-03-16	28 December 1901 – 11 July 1945
Dale Sanders	2001-05-10	
Jeremy Keith Morris Sanders	1995-03-09	
Samuel Sanders	1720-11-03	1746 Barrister
William Sanders	1864-06-02	12 January 1799 – 12 November 1875 Geologist, Bristol
Alexander Sandilands	1711-11-30	29 March 1760
Edward Ayshford Sanford	1832-12-06	23 May 1794 – 1 December 1871 MP for Somerset
Frederick Sanger	1954-03-18	
Ruth Ann Sanger	1972-03-16	6 June 1918 – 4 June 2001
Luigi Malaspina di Sannazzaro, Marquis Sannazzaro	1784-06-24	1754–1835
Matthew Sarayva	1743-04-21	fl 1743
Wallace Leslie William Sargent	1981-03-19	
Alan McLeod Sargeson	1983-03-17	30 October 1930 – 29 December 2008
Peter Sarnak	2002-05-09	
Giovanni Ambrosio Sarotti	1679-12-01	fl 1679–1714
Richard Saumarez	1834-12-18	13 November 1764 – 28 January 1835
Augustus Page Saunders	1833-04-18	1801 – 21 July 1878
Edward Saunders	1902-06-05	22 March 1848 – 6 1910
Erasmus Saunders	1759-03-22	1775 Prebendary of Rochester
George Saunders	1812-05-07	1762 – July 1839
Owen Alfred Saunders	1958-03-20	24 September 1904 – 10 October 1993
William Saunders	1745-05-02	1751
William Saunders	1793-05-09	1743 – 29 May 1817 Physician
William Wilson Saunders	1853-06-02	4 June 1809 – 13 September 1879
Nicholas Saunderson	1718-11-06	January 1682 – 19 April 1739
Horace Benedict de Saussure	1788-04-03	17 February 1740 – 22 January 1799
François Boissier de Sauvages de Lacroix	1749-05-25	12 May 1706 – ? 19 February 1767
Thomas Savery	1706-02-13	c. 1650 – May 1715
George Savile, 1st Marquess of Halifax	1675-11-30	11 November 1633 – 5 April 1695
George Savile	1721-11-02	1678 – 16 September 1743
George Savile	1747-12-10	18 July 1726 – 10 January 1784
Sir John Savill	2013-05-02	
William Scovell Savory	1858-06-03	30 November 1826 – 4 March 1895
George Albert Sawatzky	2008-05-16	
Henry Barne Sawbridge	1822-06-27	6 September 1778 – 28 April 1851
John Sawbridge	1739-06-28	1699 – 20 April 1762
Roman Mieczyslaw Sawicki	1987-03-19	20 April 1930 – 22 July 1990
John Stanley Sawyer	1962-03-15	19 June 1916 – 19 September 2000
Robin Saxby	2015-05-01	4 February 1957 – Engineer. Honorary Fellow
Leonid Sazanov	2019-04-16	
Charles Scarburgh	1663-05-20	? December 1615 – 26 February 1694 Original Fellow
Pomponio, Baron of Scarlotti	1696-04-29	1696
Antonio Scarpa	1791-05-05	? 13 June 1747 – 31 October 1832
Jacob Christian Schaffer	1764-02-23	30 May 1718 – 5 January 1790
Ingrid Scheffer	2018-05-09	21 December 1958 –
Johann Jakob Scheuchzer	1703-11-30	2 August 1672 – 23 June 1733
John Gaspar Scheuchzer	1724-05-07	1702 – 10 April 1729
Samuel Scheurer	1717-03-28	1685 – 18 September 1749
Heinz Otto Schild	1966-03-17	18 May 1906 – 15 June 1984
David William Schindler	2001-05-10	
William Schlich	1901-06-06	28 February 1840 – 28 September 1925
Jan Albert Schlosser	1756-01-22	1733–1769
Dolph Schluter	1999-05-13	
Johann Gottfried Schmeisser	1794-03-20	25 June 1767 – 5 February 1837
Brian Paul Schmidt	2012-04-19	
William George Schneider	1962-03-15	
Johann Daniel Schöpflin	1728-06-27	6 September 1694 – 7 August 1771
Andrew Noel Schofield	1992-03-12	
Christopher Schofield	2013-05-02	
Gregory D. Scholes	2019-04-16	
Meyer Low Schomberg	1726-11-30	1690 – 4 March 1761
Robert Hermann Schomburgk	1859-06-09	5 June 1804 – 11 March 1865 German explorer
Basil Ferdinand Jamieson Schonland	1938-03-17	5 February 1896 – 24 November 1972
Carl Schorlemmer	1871-06-08	30 September 1834 – 27 June 1892
George Adolphus Schott	1922-05-11	25 January 1868 – 15 July 1937
Johann Christian Daniel von Schreber	1795-04-16	17 January 1739 – 10 December 1810
Johann Hieronymus Schroter	1798-04-19	30 August 1745 – 29 August 1816
William Schroter	1662-09-17	15 November 1640 – October 1699 Original
Samuel Barnett Schryver	1928-05-10	15 March 1869 – 21 August 1929
Wolfram Schultz	2009-05-15	
Henry Edward Schunck	1850-06-06	16 August 1820 – 13 January 1903
Arthur Schuster	1879-06-12	12 September 1851 – 14 October 1934
Dennis William Sciama	1983-03-17	18 November 1926 – 18 December 1999 cosmologist
George Sclater-Booth, Baron Basing	1876-01-20	19 May 1826 – 22 October 1894
John George Sclater	1982-03-18	
Philip Lutley Sclater	1861-06-06	4 November 1829 – 27 June 1913
Giacinto Scoles	1997-05-15	
William Scoresby	1824-06-17	5 October 1789 – 21 March 1857
Alastair Ian Scott	1978-03-16	10 April 1928 – 18 April 2007
Alexander Scott	1898-06-09	28 December 1853 – 10 March 1947 Chemist, Cambridge Univ
David Alymer Scott	1949-03-17	2 October 1892 – 18 November 1971
Dukinfield Henry Scott	1894-06-07	28 November 1854 – 29 January 1934
Francis Scott, 2nd Duke of Buccleuch	1724-03-12	11 January 1695 – 22 April 1751
George Scott	1748-03-10	c. 1721 – 2 September 1780 Woolston Hall, Chigwell, Essex
George Lewis Scott	1737-05-05	May 1708 – 7 December 1780
Henry Young Darracott Scott	1875-06-03	2 January 1822 – 16 April 1883
Hugh Scott	1941-03-20	16 September 1885 – 1 November 1960 Keeper of Entomology, British Museum
James Scott	1997-05-15	
James Floyd Scott	2008-05-16	
John Corse Scott	1800-01-16	1779–1800
John Donald Scott	2003-05-15	
John Scott, 1st Earl of Eldon	1793-02-14	4 June 1751 – 13 January 1838
Peter Markham Scott	1987-06-25	14 September 1909 – 29 August 1989 Statute
Robert Henry Scott	1870-06-02	28 January 1833 – 18 June 1916
Walter Montagu Douglas Scott, 5th Duke of Buccleuch	1833-06-20	25 November 1806 – 16 April 1884
William Scott, Baron Stowell	1793-02-14	17 October 1745 – 28 January 1836
Charles Robert Scriver	1991-03-14	
George Julius Poulett Scrope	1826-12-07	10 March 1797 – 19 January 1876
Charles Scudamore	1824-01-15	1779 – 4 August 1849 Physician
John Barlow Seale	1786-03-09	23 February 1753 – 11 August 1838
John Seally	1791-06-30	c. 1747 – March 1795
George Frederick Charles Searle	1905-05-11	3 December 1864 – 16 December 1954
Michael John Seaton	1967-03-16	16 January 1923 – 29 May 2007
Samuel Seaward	1841-06-10	1800 – 11 May 1842
Albertus Seba	1728-10-24	1665 – 1 May 1736
Adam Sedgwick	1821-02-01	22 March 1785 – 27 January 1873
Adam Sedgwick	1886-06-04	28 September 1854 – 27 February 1913 Zoologist, Cambridge & London Univ
Harry Govier Seeley	1879-06-12	18 February 1839 – 8 January 1909
Anthony Walter Segal	1998-05-14	
Graeme Bryce Segal	1982-03-18	
Johann Andreas von Segner	1738-01-26	9 October 1704 – 5 October 1777
Johann Philip Seip	1736-07-01	28 October 1686 – 31 May 1757
Charles Gabriel Seligman	1919-05-15	24 December 1873 – 19 September 1940
William James Sell	1900-06-14	1847 – 7 March 1915
Godfrey Sellius	1733-05-03	c. 1704–1767
Alfred Richard Cecil Selwyn	1874-06-04	28 July 1824 – 19 October 1902
William Selwyn	1866-06-07	19 February 1806 – 24 April 1875
Ashoke Sen	1998-05-14	
John Senex	1728-06-27	30 December 1740
Robert Seppings	1814-11-10	1767 – 25 September 1840
Isaac de Sequeira Samuda	1723-06-27	? March 1743 (first Jewish Fellow of the Royal Society)
Jacob Serenius	1732-02-03	1700–1776
Caroline Series	2016-04-29	1951 –
George William Series	1971-03-18	22 February 1920 – 2 January 1995
Joseph Correa de Serra	1796-03-03	1750 – 5 June 1823
Conjeeveram Srirangachari Seshadri	1988-03-17	
Thiruvenkata Rajendra Seshadri	1960-03-24	3 February 1900 – 27 September 1975
Albert Seward	1898-06-09	9 October 1863 – 11 April 1941
William Seward	1779-02-11	January 1747 – 24 April 1799
Robert Beresford Seymour Sewell	1934-05-03	6 March 1880 – 11 February 1964
John Sewell	1820-03-02	c. 1766 – 15 January 1833 Judge, Malta
Edward Adolphus Seymour, 11th Duke of Somerset	1797-03-09	24 February 1775 – 15 August 1855
Edward James Seymour	1841-06-17	30 March 1796 – 16 April 1866 Naval Physician
Lord Webb John Seymour	1802-11-11	7 February 1777 – 15 April 1819
Joseph de Seytres, Marquis de Caumont	1740-11-13	29 June 1688 – 29 September 1745
Willem Jakob s Gravesande	1715-06-09	27 September 1688 – 28 February 1742
Richard Dickson Shackleford	1792-06-28	? 6 November 1743 – 26 November 1829
Lord Edward Arthur Alexander Shackleton	1989-06-29	15 July 1911 – 22 September 1994 Statute
Robert Millner Shackleton	1971-03-18	30 December 1909 – 3 May 2001
Nicholas John Shackleton	1985-03-21	23 June 1937 – 24 January 2006
Nigel Shadbolt	2017-05-05	
Lancelot Shadwell	1778-06-04	1 January 1815
Charles Frederick Alexander Shadwell	1861-06-06	31 January 1814 – 1 March 1886
John Shadwell	1701-12-03	1671 – 4 January 1747
James Shaen	1663-05-20	13 December 1695 Original
Timothy Shallice	1996-03-14	
Ian Alexander Shanks	1984-03-15	22 June 1948 -
Isaac Pacatus Shard	1751-01-24	23 June 1766
Man Mohan Sharma	1990-03-15	Chemical Engineer
David Sharp	1890-06-05	15 August 1840 – 27 August 1922
Paul M. Sharp	2013-05-02	
Richard Sharp	1806-06-12	1759 – 30 March 1835
Samuel Sharp	1749-04-13	c. 1700 – 24 March 1778
William Sharp	1769-04-20	1728–1810
William Sharp	1840-05-07	21 January 1805 – 10 April 1896
Daniel Sharpe	1850-06-06	6 April 1806 – 31 May 1856
Fane William Sharpe	1764-07-05	c. 1727 – 21 October 1771
Gregory Sharpe	1754-05-09	1713 – 8 January 1771
John Sharpe	1826-04-13	c. 1769 – July 1834
Edward Albert Sharpey-Schafer	1878-06-06	2 June 1850 – 29 March 1935
William Sharpey	1839-05-09	1 April 1802 – 11 April 1880
Samuel George Shattock	1917-05-03	3 November 1852 – 11 May 1924
George John Shaw-Lefevre, Baron Eversley	1899-01-26	12 June 1831 – ? 19 April 1928
John George Shaw-Lefevre	1820-11-16	24 January 1797 – 20 August 1879
Bernard Leslie Shaw	1978-03-16	
George Shaw	1789-02-26	10 December 1751 – 22 July 1813
John Shaw	1830-02-11	10 March 1776 – 30 July 1832
Joseph Shaw	1703-11-30	1671 – 24 October 1733
Peter Shaw	1752-04-16	1694 – 15 March 1763 Chemist
William Napier Shaw	1891-06-04	4 March 1854 – 23 March 1945
Thomas Shaw	1734-06-13	4 June 1694 – 15 August 1751
Trevor Ian Shaw	1971-03-18	18 March 1928 – 26 September 1972
Cresswell Shearer	1916-05-11	25 May 1874 – 6 February 1941
George Shee	1810-05-10	1754 – 3 February 1825 Govt. Minister
Martin Archer Shee	1831-04-21	20 December 1769 – 19 August 1850
Richard Sheepshanks	1830-04-01	30 July 1794 – ? 7 August 1855
Henry Sheers	1676-02-10	21 April 1710
Gilbert Sheldon	1665-03-22	19 July 1598 – 9 November 1677
John Sheldon	1784-04-29	6 July 1752 – 8 October 1808 Anatomist and surgeon
Roger Sheldon	2015-05-01	1942 – Chemist
George Michael Sheldrick	2001-05-10	
George Shelvocke	1743-03-10	? 1760 Secretary, GPO
Morgan Hwa-Tze Sheng	2007-05-17	
Allen Goodrich Shenstone	1950-03-16	27 July 1893 – 16
William Ashwell Shenstone	1898-06-09	2 December 1850 – 3 February 1908
Nicholas Ian Shepherd-Barron	2006-05-18	
Anthony Shepherd	1763-04-21	1721 – 15 June 1796
John Graham Shepherd	1999-05-13	
Lucy Amelia Shepherd	2015-10-31	24 July 1992
Richard Shepherd	1781-05-10	c. 1732 – 3 January 1809
Theodore Shepherd	2016-04-29	Meteorogist
Norman Sheppard	1967-03-16	
Percival Albert Sheppard	1964-03-19	12 May 1907 – 22 December 1977
Philip MacDonald Sheppard	1965-03-18	27 July 1921 – 17 October 1976
James Sherard	1706-12-04	1 November 1666 – 12 February 1738
William Sherard	1720-02-25	27 February 1659 – 11 August 1728
John Arthur Shercliff	1980-03-20	10 September 1927 – 6 December 1983
Thomas Sheridan	1679-02-06	1646 – c. 1688 James II Secretary
Sheila Patricia Violet Sherlock	2001-05-10	31 March 1918 – 30 December 2001
John Sherlock	1715-06-09	17 February 1719 Barrister
David John Sherratt	1992-03-12	
David Sherrington	1994-03-10	Physicist
David Colin Sherrington	2007-05-17	5 March 1945 – 4 October 2014 Professor of Chemistry
Charles Scott Sherrington	1893-06-01	27 November 1857 – 4 March 1952
Barbara Sherwood Lollar	2019-04-16	19 February 1963 –
Noah Sherwood	1745-06-20	1764
Keith P. Shine	2009-05-15	atmospheric physicist
Arthur Everett Shipley	1904-05-05	10 March 1861 – 22 September 1927
Robert Shippen	1706-11-20	1675–1745
Robert Shirley	1699-01-11	4 September 1673 – 25 February 1699
Washington Shirley, 5th Earl Ferrers	1761-12-10	26 May 1722 – 2 October 1778
David Shoenberg	1953-03-19	4 January 1911 – 10 March 2004 physics of low temperatures
Molly Shoichet	2019-04-16	
Eric Manvers Shooter	1988-03-17	
Charles William Shoppee	1956-03-15	24 February 1904 – 20 October 1994
Charles John Shore, 2nd Baron Teignmouth	1834-06-05	13 January 1796 – 18 September 1885
Charles Short	1804-05-17	c. 1762 – 4 September 1838 Barrister
James Short	1737-03-24	10 June 1710 – 14 June 1768
Roger Valentine Short	1974-03-21	
Henry Edward Shortt	1950-03-16	15 April 1887 – 9 November 1987
Frederick William Shotton	1956-03-15	8 October 1906 – 21 July 1990
George Augustus William Shuckburgh-Evelyn	1774-12-22	23 August 1751 – 11 August 1804
Francis Shuckburgh	1824-03-11	12 March 1789 – 29 October 1876
Molyneux Shuldham, Baron Shuldham	1777-03-13	c. 1717–1798
Robert Shuttleworth	1777-04-24	1744 – 29 January 1816
Ivan Ivanovich Shuvalov	1758-03-16	1 November 1727 – 14 November 1797
Wilson Sibbett	1997-05-15	
Francis Sibson	1849-06-07	21 May 1814 – 7 September 1876
Richard H. Sibson	2003-05-15	
John Sibthorp	1788-03-06	28 October 1758 – 8 February 1796
Obaid Siddiqi	1984-03-15	7 January 1932 – 26 July 2013
Salimuzzaman Siddiqui	1961-03-16	19 October 1897 – 14 April 1994
Nevil Vincent Sidgwick	1922-05-11	8 May 1873 – 15 March 1952
Charles William Siemens	1862-06-05	4 April 1823 – ? 18 November 1883
Robert William Sievier	1841-03-04	24 July 1794 – 28 April 1865
Joseph Ivor Silk	1999-05-13	
Angus Silver	2017-05-05	
Bernard Walter Silverman	1997-05-15	statistician
John Silvester	1780-03-02	1745 – 30 March 1822 Recorder of London
John Baptist Silvester	1747-11-12	? 2 November 1789
Pierre Silvestre	1699-11-30	c. 1662 – 16 April 1718
Joachim Jose Fidalgo da Silveyra	1751-10-31	fl 1751
Louis Siminovitch	1980-03-20	
Michelle Simmons	2018-05-09	14 July 1967 –
Richard Simmons	1813-03-11	c. 1781 – 18 September 1846 Physician
Robert Malcolm Simmons	1995-03-09	
Samuel Foart Simmons	1779-11-04	17 March 1750 – 23 April 1813 Physician
William Simms	1852-06-03	7 December 1793 – 21 June 1860
James Simon	1748-11-17	7 January 1757
Leon Melvyn Simon	2003-05-15	
Franz Eugen Simon	1941-03-20	2 July 1893 – 31 October 1956
John Simon	1845-01-09	10 October 1816 – 23 July 1904 Pathologist
William Simon	1716-11-30	fl 1716 -1722
John Philip Simons	1989-03-16	
John Lionel Simonsen	1932-05-05	23 July 1884 – 20 February 1957
John Augustus Francis Simpkinson	1847-04-22	December 1780 – 8 July 1851
Elizabeth Simpson	2010-05-20	
George Clarke Simpson	1915-05-06	2 September 1878 – 1 January 1965
Maxwell Simpson	1862-06-05	15 March 1815 – 26 February 1902
Patricia Ann Simpson	2000-05-11	Immunologist
Stephen Simpson	2013-05-02	entomologist
Thomas Simpson	1745-12-05	20 August 1710 – 14 May 1761
Thomas James Simpson	2001-05-10	
John Sims	1814-03-10	1750 – 26 February 1831
Anthony Ronald Entrican Sinclair	2002-05-09	
James Sinclair, 14th Earl of Caithness	1862-11-20	? 16 August 1821 – 28 March 1881
John Sinclair	1784-06-24	10 May 1754 – 21 December 1835
Frank Sturdy Sinnatt	1938-03-17	4 May 1880 – 27 January 1943
John Alexander Sinton	1946-03-21	2 December 1884 – 25 March 1956
Henning Sirringhaus	2009-05-15	
James Six	1792-01-19	30 January 1730 – 25 August 1793
John James Skehel	1984-03-15	
Alec Westley Skempton	1961-03-16	4 June 1914 – 9 August 2001
Frederic Carpenter Skey	1837-04-20	1 December 1798 – 15 August 1872
Herbert Wakefield Banks Skinner	1942-03-19	7 October 1900 – 20 January 1960
Samuel Skinner	1740-06-19	? 1743 Astronomer
Phillip Skippon	1667-05-16	28 October 1641 – ? August 1691 Naturalist. MP for Dunwich
Evgeny Konstantinovich Sklyanin	2008-05-16	
Maurice Skolnick	2009-05-15	
Carl Johan Fredrik Skottsberg	1950-04-27	1 December 1880 – 14 June 1963
Charles Roger Slack	1989-03-16	
Gordon Douglas Slade	2017-05-05	
Nicholas Slanning	1664-12-21	June 1643 – ? April 1691 MP & Commissioner
Frederick Slare	1680-12-16	c. 1647 – 12 September 1727
Edward Charles Slater	1975-03-20	
William Kershaw Slater	1957-05-30	19 October 1893 – 19 April 1970
Ralph Owen Slatyer	1975-03-20	16 April 1929 – 27 July 2012 Biologist, Australia
John Sleath	1820-03-23	? June 1767 – 30 April 1847
Julia Slingo	2015-05-01	1950-12-13 – Meteorologist and climate scientist
Henry Slingsby	1663-04-22	c. 1621 – c. 1688 Original Master of the Mint
Scott William Sloan	2015-05-01	Civil Engineer
Hans Sloane	1685-01-21	16 April 1660 – 11 January 1753
William Sloane	1722-05-24	17 January 1696 – 18 February 1767 Nephew of Hans Sloane
Renatus Franciscus Slusius	1674-04-16	7 July 1622 – 19 March 1685
Raymond Edward Smallman	1986-03-20	4 August 1929 – 25 February 2015 Metallurgist
John Smeaton	1753-03-15	8 June 1724 – 28 October 1792
Alfred Smee	1841-06-10	18 June 1818 – 11 January 1877 Surgeon
Walter Nugent Thomas Smee	1834-04-10	1801 – 7 February 1877
Francis Smethwick	1667-04-04	1682
Samuel Smiles	1918-05-02	17 July 1877 – 6 May 1953 Prof of Chemistry, UCL
John Smirnove	1825-05-05	fl 1825–1844
Alan Edward Smith	2010-05-20	Geneticist
Adam Smith	1767-05-21	5 June 1723 – 17 July 1790
Adrian Frederick Melhuish Smith	2001-05-10	
Alison Mary Smith	2016-04-29	Biologist
Andrew Smith	1857-06-11	1797 – 12 August 1872
Andrew Benjamin Smith	2002-05-09	
Archibald Smith	1856-06-05	10 August 1813 – 26 December 1872
Austin Gerard Smith	2006-05-18	
Bernard Smith	1933-05-11	13 February 1881 – 19 August 1936
Charles Hamilton Smith	1824-05-13	26 December 1776 – 21 September 1859
Christopher Hubert Llewellyn Smith	1984-03-15	
Colin P. Smith	2014-04-30	Engineering Director, Rolls-Royce
David Smith	1988-03-17	Chemical physicist
David Cecil Smith	1975-03-20	Botanist
David Macleish Smith	1952-03-20	9 June 1900 – 3 August 1986
Desmond Stanley Smith	1976-03-18	
Donald Smith, 1st Baron Strathcona and Mount Royal	1904-06-16	6 August 1820 – 21 January 1914 Statute
Edward Smith	1738-01-19	fl 1738
Edward Smith	1664-01-27	fl 1664–1668
Edward Smith	1860-06-07	c. 1818 – 16 November 1874
Edward Smith	1696-04-29	1665 – 4 November 1720 Bishop of Down & Connor
Edwin Smith	1996-03-14	28 July 1931 – 4 July 2010 Metallurgist, Manchester
Ernest Lester Smith	1957-03-21	7 August 1904 – 6 November 1992
Frank Edward Smith	1918-05-02	14 October 1876 – 1 July 1970
Frank Ewart Smith	1957-03-21	31 May 1897 – 14 June 1995
Frank Thomas Smith	1984-03-15	
Frederick John Smith	1894-06-07	2 April 1848 – 23 August 1911
Geoffrey Lilley Smith	2003-05-15	
George David William Smith	1996-03-14	
Grafton Elliot Smith	1907-05-02	15 August 1871 – 1 January 1937
Harry Smith	2000-05-11	19 September 1935 – 9 February 2015 Prof of Botany, Leicester Univ
Harry Smith	1979-03-15	Prof of Microbiology, Univ of B'ham
Henry John Stephen Smith	1861-06-06	3 November 1826 – 9 February 1883
Herbert Williams Smith	1980-03-20	3 May 1919 – 16 June 1987
Ian William Murison Smith	1995-03-09	
James Smith	1830-12-23	15 August 1782 – 17 January 1867
James Cuthbert Smith	1993-03-11	
James Edward Smith	1785-05-26	2 December 1759 – 17 March 1828
James Eric Smith	1958-03-20	23 February 1909 – 3 September 1990
James Lorrain Smith	1909-05-06	21 August 1862 – 18 April 1931
John Derek Smith	1976-03-18	8 December 1924 – 22 November 2003
John Mark Frederick Smith	1841-11-18	11 January 1790 – 20 November 1874
John Maynard Smith	1977-03-17	6 January 1920 – 19 April 2004
John Smith	1773-05-27	c. 1744 – 13 November 1807
John Smith	1809-05-11	21 August 1817
John Pye Smith	1840-01-23	25 May 1774 – 5 February 1851
John Spencer Smith	1803-03-10	c. 1770 – 5 June 1845
John Thomas Smith	1837-06-01	16 April 1805 – 14 May 1882 Madras Engineers
Joseph Smith	1819-11-25	1775 – 28 May 1857 Barrister
Joseph Victor Smith	1978-03-16	
Kenneth Manley Smith	1938-03-17	13 November 1892 – 11 June 1981
Matthew Smith	1801-02-26	fl 1801 Captain, RN
Matthew Smith	1795-11-19	1739–1812 Captain, Tower of London
Michael Smith	1986-03-20	26 April 1932 – 5 October 2000
Peter Smith	2017-05-05	
Robert Smith	1719-02-05	1689 – 2 February 1768
Robert Smith	1796-11-24	22 November 1747 – 27 September 1832 Solicitor
Robert Allan Smith	1962-03-15	14 May 1909 – 16 May 1980
Robert Angus Smith	1857-06-11	15 February 1817 – 12 May 1884
Robert Smith, 1st Baron Carrington	1800-05-29	? 2 February 1752 – 18 September 1838
Samuel Walter Johnson Smith	1914-05-07	26 January 1871 – 20 August 1948
Stanley Desmond Smith	1976-03-18	
Thomas Smith	1816-04-25	21 January 1777 – 15 March 1824 Barrister
Thomas Smith	1932-05-05	6 April 1883 – 28 November 1969 Optics Section, NPL
Thomas Smith	1677-12-06	3 June 1638 – 11 May 1710
William Cusac Smith	1805-04-25	23 January 1766 – 21 August 1836 Bt & MP
William Sidney Smith	1811-06-13	21 June 1764 – 26 May 1840
William Wright Smith	1945-03-22	2 February 1875 – 15 December 1956
William Smith	1806-02-13	22 September 1756 – 31 May 1835
William Henry Smith	1878-02-14	24 June 1825 – 6 October 1891
Wilson Smith	1949-03-17	21 June 1897 – 10 July 1965 Microbiologist
Arthur Smithells	1901-06-06	25 May 1860 – 8 February 1939
James Smithson	1787-04-19	1765 – 27 June 1829 bequest founds the Smithsonian Institution
John Smol	2018-05-09	10 October 1955 –
Jan Christiaan Smuts	1930-06-26	24 May 1870 – 11 September 1950 Statute 12
Charles Piazzi Smyth	1857-06-11	3 January 1819 – 21 February 1900; resigned in 1874
David Henry Smyth	1967-03-16	9 February 1908 – 10 September 1979
George Smyth	1663-05-20	c. 1629 – 15 August 1702 Physician & Original Fellow
James Carmichael Smyth	1779-05-06	1741 – 18 June 1821
Warington Wilkinson Smyth	1858-06-03	26 August 1817 – 19 June 1890
William Henry Smyth	1826-06-15	21 January 1788 – 9 September 1865
Percy Clinton Sydney Smythe, 6th Viscount Strangford	1825-02-03	31 August 1780 – 29 May 1855
Sidney Stafford Smythe	1742-03-11	1705 – 2 November 1778
William James Smythe	1864-06-02	25 January 1816 – 12 July 1887
Henry James Snaith	2015-05-01	Physicist
Peter Henry Andrews Sneath	1995-03-09	17 November 1923 – 9 September 2011
Ian Naismith Sneddon	1983-03-17	8 December 1919 – 4 November 2000
George James Snelus	1887-06-09	25 June 1837 – 18 June 1906
Thomas Snodgrass	1822-11-14	28 August 1834
George Robert Sabine Snow	1948-03-18	19 January 1897 – 1 August 1969
Christopher Maxwell Snowden	2005-05-26	
Allan Whitenack Snyder	1990-03-15	
William Soame	1667-11-21	c. 1644–1686
John Soane	1821-11-15	10 September 1753 – 20 January 1837
Renee Elizabeth (Liz) Sockett	2019-04-16	1962
Frederick Soddy	1910-05-05	2 September 1877 – 26 September 1956
Timothy Softley	2018-05-09	1958 –
Daniel Charles Solander	1764-06-07	? 19 February 1733 – ? 13 May 1782
Heinrich Friedrich de Solenthal	1744-01-12	1752
William Johnson Sollas	1889-06-06	30 May 1849 – 20 October 1936
Edward Solly	1843-01-19	11 October 1819 – 2 April 1886 Chemist
Richard Horsman Solly	1807-05-07	? 29 April 1774 – 31 March 1858
Samuel Solly	1792-11-22	c. 1724 – 5 January 1807
Samuel Solly	1812-05-14	9 May 1847
Samuel Solly	1837-01-19	13 May 1805 – 24 September 1871 Surgeon
Samuel Reynolds Solly	1823-05-29	c. 1781–1866
David Henry Solomon	2004-05-27	
Laszlo Solymar	1995-03-09	
John Somers, 1st Baron Somers	1698-11-30	? 4 March 1650 – 26 April 1716
Charles Somerset, Marquess of Worcester	1673-06-04	December 1660 – 13 July 1698
Christopher Roland Somerville	1991-03-14	
William Somerville	1817-12-11	22 April 1771 – 25 June 1860 Physician
Peter Somogyi	2000-05-11	
Franz Sondheimer	1967-05-16	18 May 1926 – 11 February 1981 organic chemist
Nahum Sonenberg	2006-05-18	
Ajay Kumar Sood	2015-05-01	1951 – Indian physicist
Alan Soper	2014-04-30	Physical Chemist, STFC Rutherford Appleton Laboratory
Thomas Sopwith	1845-06-05	3 January 1803 – 16 January 1879
Samuel de Sorbiere	1663-06-22	17 September 1615 – 9 April 1670
Henry Clifton Sorby	1857-06-11	10 May 1826 – 9 March 1908
William Sotheby	1744-03-08	7 February 1766 Colonel
William Sotheby	1794-11-13	9 November 1757 – 30 December 1833
Luis Pinto de Sousa Coutinho	1787-04-19	1735–1804 Portuguese politician
James South	1821-02-15	October 1785 – 19 October 1867
Edwin Mellor Southern	1983-03-17	
Henry Herbert Southey	1825-04-14	? 1783 – 13 June 1865
Edward Southwell	1692-11-30	4 September 1671 – 4 December 1730
Richard Vynne Southwell	1925-05-07	2 July 1888 – 9 December 1970
Robert Southwell	1663-05-20	31 December 1635 – 11 September 1702 Original
Thomas Southwell, 2nd Baron Southwell	1735-03-13	7 January 1698 – ? 20 November 1766
Thomas Richard Edmund Southwood	1977-03-17	20 June 1931 – 26 October 2005
Gaspar Merez de Souza	1669-11-18	fl 1669–1684
Andrew Michael Soward	1991-03-14	
Nicola Spaldin	2017-05-05	
Dudley Brian Spalding	1983-03-17	
John Spalding	1797-07-06	26 August 1815
Lazzaro Spallanzani	1768-06-02	13 January 1729 – 11 February 1799
Ezekiel, Freiherr von Spanheim	1679-02-03	7 December 1629 – 25 October 1710
Bowyer Edward Sparke	1810-03-15	27 April 1759 – 4 April 1836 Bishop of Ely
Robert Stephen John Sparks	1988-03-17	Professor of Earth Sciences
Leonard Frank Spath	1940-03-14	20 October 1882 – 2 March 1957
John Speakman	2018-05-09	1958 –
Walter Eric Spear	1980-03-20	
Charles Edward Spearman	1924-05-15	10 September 1863 – 17 September 1945
Terence Speed	2013-05-02	
William Speer	1812-05-28	c. 1764 – 11 April 1844 HM Treasury
Robert Spence	1959-03-19	7 October 1905 – 10 March 1976 Chemist, Canada
William Spence	1834-04-10	1783 – 6 January 1860
Harold Spencer Jones	1930-05-15	29 March 1890 – 3 November 1960
Anthony James Merrill Spencer	1987-03-19	
Charles Spencer, 3rd Duke of Marlborough	1744-01-12	22 November 1706 – 20 October 1758
Charles Spencer, 3rd Earl of Sunderland	1698-11-30	c. 1674 – 19 April 1722
Francis Almeric Spencer, 1st Baron Churchill	1818-12-10	26 December 1779 – 10 March 1845
George Spencer, 4th Duke of Marlborough	1786-05-25	26 January 1739 – 29 January 1817
Leonard James Spencer	1925-05-07	7 July 1870 – 14 April 1959
Robert Spencer, 2nd Earl of Sunderland	1662-05-15	4 August 1640–1702
Walter Baldwin Spencer	1900-06-14	23 June 1860 – 14 July 1929
William Kingdon Spencer	1931-05-07	10 December 1878 – 1 October 1955
Otto Sperling	1700-11-30	3 January 1634 – 18 March 1715 Barrister and author
Paraskevas Sphicas	2019-04-16	13 July 1963 –
David John Spiegelhalter	2005-05-26	statistician
Maria Grazia Spillantini	2013-05-02	
James Spilman	1734-10-31	c. 1680 – 21 November 1763
Alfred Spinks	1977-03-17	25 February 1917 – 11 February 1982
Francesco Spoleti	1696-07-15	26 December 1712 Physician
William Spottiswoode	1853-06-02	11 January 1825 – 27 June 1883
John Spranger	1791-03-24	1744–1804 Master in Chancery
Thomas Sprat	1712-03-20	5 April 1679 – 10 May 1720 Clergyman, Archdeacon of Rochester
Thomas Sprat	1663-05-20	1635 – 20 May 1713 Original Fellow
Brian Geoffrey Spratt	1993-03-11	
Thomas Abel Brimage Spratt	1856-06-05	11 May 1811 – 10 March 1888
Hermann Johann Phillipp Sprengel	1878-06-06	29 August 1834 – 14 January 1906
Conrad Joachim Sprengwell	1721-03-09	14 March 1740
Jonathan Sprent	1998-05-14	
Frank Stuart Spring	1952-03-20	5 September 1907 – 1 March 1997
Henry Harpur Spry	1841-05-13	6 January 1804 – 4 September 1842
Herbert Brian Squire	1957-03-21	13 July 1909 – 22 November 1961
Samuel Squire	1746-05-15	1713 – 7 May 1766
Mandyam Veerambudi Srinivasan	2001-05-10	
John St Aubyn	1797-05-18	17 May 1758 – 10 August 1839 MP for Truro, Penryn and Helston
Peter Henry St George Hyslop	2004-05-27	
Chevalier de St George	1750-01-11	c. 1764
Henry St. John, Viscount Bolingbroke	1713-01-29	October 1678 – 12 December 1751
Oliver St John	1720-02-25	c. 1691 – 26 November 1743 Barrister
St Andrew St John, 14th Baron St John of Bletso	1808-02-18	22 August 1759 – 15 October 1817
Robert Daniel St Johnston	2005-05-26	
Anthony John Stace	2002-05-09	
Maurice Stacey	1950-03-16	8 April 1907 – 9 October 1994
Thomas Stack	1738-01-26	1756
William Matthias Stafford-Howard, 3rd Earl of Stafford	1743-06-16	? 24 February 1718 – 28 February 1751
Godfrey Harry Stafford	1979-03-15	15 April 1920 – 29 July 2013 Director of the Rutherford Appleton Laboratories
Henry Tibbats Stainton	1867-06-06	13 August 1822 – 2 December 1892
Joannes Adamus Stampfer	1688-11-30	? 1743
John Frederick Stanford	1844-02-01	January 1815 – 2 December 1880
Alexander Stanhope	1663-05-20	1638 – 20 September 1707 Original Fellow
Charles Stanhope	1726-07-07	1673 – 16 March 1760 MP for Milborne Port, Aldborough and Harwich
John Spencer Stanhope	1816-06-27	27 May 1787 – 7 November 1873
Philip Stanhope, 2nd Earl of Chesterfield	1708-11-30	1633 – 28 January 1713
Philip Stanhope, 2nd Earl Stanhope	1735-11-06	15 August 1714 – 7 March 1786
Philip Stanhope, 5th Earl of Chesterfield	1776-12-19	10 November 1755 – 29 August 1815
William Stanhope, 1st Earl of Harrington	1741-12-17	c. 1690 – 8 December 1756
Roger Yate Stanier	1978-03-16	22 October 1916 – 29 January 1982
William Arthur Stanier	1944-03-16	27 May 1876 – 27 September 1965
Arthur Penrhyn Stanley	1863-06-04	13 December 1815 – 18 July 1881
Edward Stanley	1830-03-11	3 July 1793 – 24 May 1862 Surgeon, St Barts
Edward Stanley	1765-03-07	fl 1765–1789
Edward Henry Stanley, 15th Earl of Derby	1859-12-15	21 July 1826 – 21 April 1893
Edward Stanley, Bishop of Norwich	1840-06-04	1 January 1779 – 6 September 1849
George Stanley	1719-02-25	? 31 January 1734 Suicide
Herbert Muggleton Stanley	1966-03-17	20 July 1903 – 4 July 1987
John Thomas Stanley, Baron Stanley of Alderley	1790-04-29	26 November 1766 – 23 October 1850
Owen Stanley	1842-03-03	13 June 1811 – 13 March 1850
Richard Stanley	1791-05-26	April 1738 – 5 July 1810 Barrister
John Stanley	1698-11-09	1663 – 30 November 1744 Baronet, Commissioner and MP
Thomas Stanley	1663-05-20	1625 – 12 April 1678 Original Fellow
William Stanley	1689-11-30	? August 1647 – 9 October 1731
Thomas Edward Stanton	1914-05-07	23 December 1865 – 30 August 1931
Temple Stanyan	1726-05-12	c. 1677 – 25 March 1752
Otto Stapf	1908-05-07	23 March 1857 – 3 August 1933
Reginald George Stapledon	1939-03-16	22 September 1882 – 6 September 1960
George Robert Stark	1990-03-15	
Ernest Henry Starling	1899-06-01	17 April 1866 – 2 May 1927
James Staunton	1998-05-14	
George Leonard Staunton	1787-02-15	? 10 April 1737 – 14 January 1801
George Thomas Staunton	1803-04-28	26 May 1781 – 10 August 1859
Edgar William Richard Steacie	1948-03-18	25 December 1900 – 28 August 1962
John Edward Stead	1903-06-11	11 October 1851 – 31 October 1923
Richard Stearne	1665-03-29	c. 1596 – 18 June 1683
Thomas Steavens	1752-03-05	20 June 1759
Henry Stebbing	1845-04-03	26 August 1799 – 22 September 1883
Henry Stebbing	1765-01-24	1716 – 13 November 1787
Thomas Roscoe Rede Stebbing	1896-06-04	6 February 1835 – 9 July 1926
Edgar Stedman	1938-03-17	12 July 1890 – 8 May 1975
John Wickham Steeds	1988-03-17	
Karen Penelope Steel	2009-05-15	
Bertram Dillon Steele	1919-05-15	30 May 1870 – 12 April 1934
John Hyslop Steele	1978-03-16	
George Steevens	1767-05-28	10 May 1736 – 22 January 1800
Jacob de Stehelin	1773-06-10	1710 – 6 July 1785
John Peter Stehelin	1739-11-08	? 2 July 1753
Johann Georg Steigertahl	1714-11-11	c. 1667 – c. 1740
John Stenhouse	1848-06-09	21 October 1809 – 31 December 1880
Douglas W Stephan	2013-05-02	
Archibald John Stephens	1832-04-05	1808 – 30 January 1880
Francis Stephens	1793-03-07	c. 1739 – 20 December 1807
Graeme Stephens	2018-05-09	
Leonard Robert Stephens	2011-05-19	
John William Watson Stephens	1920-05-13	2 March 1865 – 17 May 1946
Philip Stephens	1771-06-06	11 October 1725 – 20 November 1809
Philip John Stephens	2008-05-16	
Tyringham Stephens	1766-03-13	17 February 1768
William Stephens	1718-12-01	c. 1693 – 10 February 1760 Physician
John Stephenson	1930-05-15	6 February 1871 – 2 February 1933 Prof of Zoology, Edinburgh Univ.
Marjory Stephenson	1945-03-22	24 January 1885 – 12 December 1948
Robert Stephenson	1849-06-07	16 October 1803 – 12 October 1859
Thomas Alan Stephenson	1951-03-15	19 January 1898 – 3 April 1961
George Stepney	1697-11-30	1663 – 15 September 1707
Patrick Christopher Steptoe	1987-03-19	9 June 1913 – 22 March 1988
Claudio Daniel Stern	2008-05-16	
Nicholas Stern	2014-04-30	22 April 1946
John Robert Steuart	1829-01-15	c. 1853
Henry Stewart Stevens	1740-10-23	1760
John Stevens	1734-10-31	15 July 1737 Surgeon to Prince of Wales
Malcolm Francis Graham Stevens	2009-05-15	
Thomas Stevens Stevens	1963-03-21	8 October 1900 – 12 November 2000
David John Stevenson	1993-03-11	
William Ford Stevenson	1811-11-21	– 3 February 1852
Frederick Campion Steward	1957-03-21	16 June 1904 – 13 September 1993
Balfour Stewart	1862-06-05	1 November 1828 – 19 December 1887
Charles Stewart	1896-06-04	18 May 1840 – 27 September 1907
Dugald Stewart	1814-06-23	22 November 1753 – 11 June 1828
Henry Robert Stewart, 2nd Marquess of Londonderry	1802-11-11	18 June 1769 – 12 August 1822 Lord Castlereagh
Ian Nicholas Stewart	2001-05-10	
John Stewart	1776-05-23	1778 HEIC Secretary, Bengal
Matthew Stewart	1764-06-21	January 1717 – 23 January 1785
Robert William Stewart	1970-03-19	21 August 1923 – 19 January 2005
Frederick Henry Stewart	1964-03-19	16 January 1916 – 9 December 2001
William Duncan Paterson Stewart	1977-03-17	
Keith Stewartson	1965-03-18	20 September 1925 – 7 May 1983
Georg Stiernhielm	1669-12-09	7 August 1598 – 22 April 1672
Walter Stiles	1928-05-10	23 August 1886 – 19 April 1966
Walter Stanley Stiles	1957-03-21	15 June 1901 – 15 December 1985
Edward Stillingfleet	1688-11-30	c. 1660 – June 1708
Bruce William Stillman	1993-03-11	
George Stinton	1776-05-23	c. 1730 – 30 April 1783
Charles Stirling	1806-06-19	28 April 1760 – 7 November 1833
Charles James Matthew Stirling	1986-03-20	
Edward Hamilton Stirling	1838-05-03	? 1874
James Stirling	1726-11-03	1692 – 5 December 1770
Edward Charles Stirling	1893-06-01	8 September 1848 – 20 March 1919
James Stirling	1902-04-24	3 May 1836 – 27 June 1916
Walter Stirling	1801-03-05	24 June 1758 – ? 26 August 1832
William James Stirling	1999-05-13	
Bruce Arnold Dunbar Stocker	1966-03-17	26 May 1917 – 30 August 2004
Brigitta Stockinger	2013-05-02	
James Stodart	1821-06-07	c. 1760 – 11 September 1823
James Fraser Stoddart	1994-03-10	24 May 1942 – 30 December 2024
Boris Peter Stoicheff	1975-03-20	
Michael George Parke Stoker	1968-03-21	
Charles Stokes	1821-01-18	1784 – 28 December 1853
George Gabriel Stokes	1851-06-05	14 August 1819 – 1 February 1903
William Stokes	1861-06-06	1804 – ? 10 January 1878
Edmund Stone	1725-04-15	1768 Mathematician
Edward James Stone	1868-06-04	28 February 1831 – 9 May 1897
Francis Gordon Albert Stone	1976-03-18	19 May 1925 – 6 April 2011
Arthur Marshall Stoneham	1989-03-16	18 May 1940 – 18 February 2011
Robert Stoneley	1935-05-16	14 May 1894 – 2 February 1976 Mathematician
Edmund Clifton Stoner	1937-05-06	2 October 1899 – 27 December 1968
Bindon Blood Stoney	1881-06-02	13 June 1828 – 5 May 1909
George Gerald Stoney	1911-05-04	28 November 1863 – 15 May 1942
George Johnstone Stoney	1861-06-06	15 February 1826 – 5 July 1911
John Stopford, Baron Stopford of Fallowfield	1927-05-12	25 June 1888 – 6 March 1961
John Storer	1816-06-27	1839
Harold Haydon Storey	1946-03-21	10 June 1894 – 5 April 1969
Mervyn Herbert Nevil Story-Maskelyne	1870-06-02	3 September 1823 – 20 May 1911
Anthony Mervin Reeve Story	1823-11-27	8 May 1791 – 15 May 1879 Barrister
Michael James Stowell	1984-03-15	
Jonathan P. Stoye	2017-05-05	
Edward Hardinge John Stracey	1810-06-07	September 1768 – 14 July 1851
John Strachey	1719-11-05	10 May 1671 – 11 June 1743
Richard Strachey	1854-06-01	24 July 1817 – 12 February 1908
Reginald Edward Stradling	1943-03-18	12 May 1891 – 26 January 1952
Aubrey Strahan	1903-06-11	20 April 1852 – 4 March 1928
William John Strang	1977-03-17	29 June 1921 – 14 September 1999
Alexander Strange	1864-06-02	27 April 1818 – 9 March 1876 Surveyor
John Strange	1766-04-10	1732 – 19 March 1799
Giles Strangways	1673-12-11	3 June 1615 – 20 July 1675
William Fox-Strangways, 4th Earl of Ilchester	1821-03-08	7 May 1795 – 10 January 1865
Angela Strank	2018-05-09	October 1952 –
Edward Stratford, 2nd Earl of Aldborough	1777-05-29	2 January 1801
William Samuel Stratford	1832-06-09	22 May 1789 – 29 March 1853
James Lyon Strathmore	1732-05-11	? December 1702 – 4 January 1735
Simone Stratico	1764-01-19	1733 – 16 July 1824
Joseph Straton	1830-05-06	23 October 1840
Michael Rudolf Stratton	2008-05-16	
Frederick John Marrian Stratton	1947-03-20	16 October 1881 – 2 September 1960
George Frederick Stratton	1807-02-05	17 October 1779 – ? 1833
Nicholas James Strausfeld	2002-05-09	
Hugh Edwin Strickland	1852-06-03	2 March 1811 – ? 13 September 1853
Christopher Brian Stringer	2004-05-27	
Edward Strutt, 1st Baron Belper	1860-03-22	26 October 1801 – 30 June 1880
John William Strutt, 3rd Baron Rayleigh	1873-06-12	12 November 1842 – 30 June 1919
Robert John Strutt, 4th Baron Rayleigh	1905-05-11	28 August 1875 – 13 December 1947
William Strutt	1817-06-26	20 July 1756 – 29 December 1830
Friedrich Georg Wilhelm Struve	1827-03-15	15 April 1793 – 23 November 1864
Otto Struve	1954-04-29	12 August 1897 – 6 April 1963
Nicholas Struyck	1750-02-22	1686–1769
Natalie C.J. Strynadka	2015-05-01	Biochemist
Paul Edmund de Strzelecki	1853-06-02	20 July 1797 – 6 October 1873, German explorer and geologist
John Stuart-Wortley, 2nd Baron Wharncliffe	1829-06-04	20 April 1801 – 22 October 1855
Alexander Stuart	1714-11-30	c. 1673 – 15 September 1742
Charles Stuart	1720-02-25	c. 1682 – 15 February 1770
David Ian Stuart	1996-03-14	
James Stuart	1758-04-27	1713 – 2 February 1788
John Trevor Stuart	1974-03-21	
John Stuart, 1st Marquess of Bute	1799-12-12	30 June 1744 – 16 November 1814
Nicholas Stuart	1667-10-24	c. 1616 – 15 February 1710 Chamberlain of Exchequer, MP for Lymington
Cyril James Stubblefield	1944-03-16	6 September 1901 – 23 October 1999
Philip Stubs	1703-11-30	2 October 1665 – 13 September 1738
William Stukeley	1718-03-13	7 November 1687 – 3 March 1765
William Sturges-Bourne	1826-04-20	8 November 1769 – 1 February 1845
Alvaro Lopez Suasso	1735-04-24	1752
Charles Walter Suckling	1978-03-16	24 July 1920 – 31 October 2013 Biochemist
Willie Sucksmith	1940-03-14	21 September 1896 – 16 September 1981
Jean Joseph Sue	1760-12-18	20 April 1710 – 15 December 1792
Thomas Le Sueur	1741-12-10	
Samuel Sugden	1934-05-03	21 February 1892 – 20 October 1950
Theodore Morris Sugden	1963-03-21	31 December 1919 – 3 January 1984
Richard Joseph Sullivan	1785-12-22	10 December 1752 – 17 July 1806 Baronet, MP
Endre Süli	2021-04-24	21 June 1956 –
John Edward Sulston	1986-03-20	
Roger Everett Summons	2008-05-16	
John Bird Sumner	1848-12-14	25 February 1780 – 6 September 1862 Archbishop of Canterbury
Daniel de Superville	1741-02-12	1696 – c. 1770
Richard Brooke Supple	1788-05-01	6 January 1758 – 27 November 1829 later Richard de Capell Brooke
Mriganka Sur	2006-05-18	
M Azim Surani	1990-03-15	
Reginald Cockcroft Sutcliffe	1957-03-21	16 November 1904 – 28 May 1991
Alexander John Sutherland	1846-06-18	7 April 1811 – 31 January 1867 Physician
Alexander Robert Sutherland	1828-03-13	c. 1772 – 24 May 1861
Grant Robert Sutherland	1996-03-14	Human geneticist
Gordon Brims Black McIvor Sutherland	1949-03-17	8 April 1907 – 27 June 1980
John David Sutherland	2017-05-05	
Adrian Peter Sutton	2003-05-15	
John Sutton	1966-03-17	8 July 1919 – 6 September 1992 Geologist
Leslie Ernest Sutton	1950-03-16	22 June 1906 – 30 October 1992
Oliver Graham Sutton	1949-03-17	5 February 1903 – 26 May 1977
Jesper Qualmann Svejstrup	2009-05-15	
William Swainson	1820-12-14	8 October 1789 – 7 December 1855
John Crossley Swallow	1968-03-21	11 October 1923 – 3 December 1994
Monkombu Sambasivan Swaminathan	1973-03-15	
Joseph Wilson Swan	1894-06-07	31 October 1828 – 27 May 1914
Michael Meredith Swann, Baron Swann of Coln St Denys	1962-03-15	1 March 1920 – 22 September 1990
Clement Tudway Swanston	1839-03-14	1783 – 19 April 1863
Charles Swanton	2018-05-09	
Govind Swarup	1991-03-14	
Sir Martin Nicholas Sweeting	2000-05-11	
Gerhard van Swieten	1749-05-04	7 May 1700 – 18 June 1772
James Swinburne	1906-05-03	28
John Edward Swinburne	1818-02-26	6 March 1762 – 26 September 1860
Philip van Swinden	1772-04-02	fl 1772–1787
Robert Swinhoe	1876-06-01	1 September 1836 – 28 October 1877
Henry Peter Francis Swinnerton-Dyer	1967-03-16	
Sidney Swinney	1764-02-16	12 December 1783
Alan Archibald Campbell Swinton	1915-05-06	19 October 1863 – 19 February 1930
John Swinton	1729-10-16	1703 – 4 April 1777
Philip Sydenham	1700-11-30	c. 1676 – 10 October 1739
Alfred Geoffrey Sykes	1999-05-13	
Brian Douglas Sykes	2000-05-11	
Charles Sykes	1943-03-18	27 February 1905 – 29 January 1982 Metallurgist
Richard Brook Sykes	1997-05-15	
William Henry Sykes	1834-02-06	25 January 1790 – 16 June 1872
James Joseph Sylvester	1839-04-25	3 September 1814 – 15 March 1897 mathematician
Jacobus Sylvius	1687-03-09	c. 1647–1689
Michael Symes	1800-12-18	c. 1753 – 22 January 1809 Diplomat & Soldier
Johnson Symington	1903-06-11	9 September 1851 – 24 February 1924
Robert Symmer	1753-11-15	19 June 1763
John Symmons	1794-07-10	1832
William Symonds	1835-06-04	24 September 1782 – 30 March 1856
George James Symons	1878-06-06	6 August 1838 – 10 March 1900
Martyn Christian Raymond Symons	1985-03-21	12 November 1925 – 29 January 2002
Robert Henry Symons	1988-03-17	20 March 1934 – 4 October 2006
John Lighton Synge	1943-03-18	23 March 1897 – 30 March 1995
Richard Laurence Millington Synge	1950-03-16	28 October 1914 – 18 August 1994
Jack William Szostak	2019-04-16	9 November 1952 –
Michael Szwarc	1966-03-17	19 June 1909 – 4 August 2000 polymer chemistry

=== T ===
Name	Election date	Notes
David Tabor	1963-03-21	23 October 1913 – 26 November 2005
Carlo Taglini	1733-02-01	1679 – 18 September 1747
Archibald Campbell Tait	1859-01-27	21 December 1811 – ? 1 December 1882
James Francis Tait	1959-03-19	1 December 1925 – 2 February 2014
Sylvia Agnes Sophia Tait	1959-03-19	8 January 1917 – 28 February 2003 UK Biochemist
Charles Chetwynd-Talbot, 2nd Earl Talbot	1813-05-06	25 April 1777 – 10 January 1849
Christopher Rice Mansel Talbot	1831-03-17	10 May 1803 – 17 January 1890
James Talbot, 4th Baron Talbot of Malahide	1858-02-18	22 November 1805 – 14 April 1883
Gilbert Talbot	1663-04-22	c. 1607 – ? July 1695 Original. Master of Jewel Office. MP for Plymouth
John Talbot	1663-07-29	7 June 1630 – 13 March 1714
Nick Talbot	2014-04-30	Geneticist, Exeter University
William Talbot	1742-12-16	c. 1719–1768
William Henry Fox Talbot	1831-03-17	11 February 1800 – 17 September 1877
John Francis Talling	1978-03-16	British Limnologist
Patrick Ping Leung Tam	2011-05-19	Microbiologist
Henry William Lloyd Tanner	1899-06-01	17 February 1851 – 6 March 1915
Joseph Tanner	1710-11-30	19 October 1724 British Surgeon
Roger Ian Tanner	2001-05-10	rheologist
Arthur George Tansley	1915-05-06	15 August 1871 – 25 November 1955
Terence Chi-Shen Tao	2007-05-17	
Jamshed Rustom Tata	1973-03-15	Medical Research, London
Henry Tattam	1835-02-05	? 28 December 1788 – 8 January 1868
Richard Taunton	1835-04-02	c. 1774 – 26 March 1838
Simon Tavaré	2011-05-19	
George Frederic Tavel	1818-01-29	c. 1773 – 26 April 1829 English clergyman
Roger John Tayler	1995-03-09	25 October 1929 – 23 January 1997
Andrew D. Taylor	2019-04-16	
Alfred Swaine Taylor	1845-11-20	11 December 1806 – 27 May 1880
Brook Taylor	1712-03-20	18 August 1685 – 30 November 1731
Charles Taylor	1722-11-01	c. 1693 – 6 July 1766 MP for Totnes, Barrister
Edward Wilfred Taylor	1952-03-20	29 April 1891 – 1 November 1980 UK Optics Manufacturer
Edwin William Taylor	1978-03-16	
Geoffrey Ingram Taylor	1919-05-15	7 March 1886 – 27 June 1975
George Taylor	1968-03-21	15 February 1904 – 13 November 1993
George Watson-Taylor	1826-02-16	1771- 6 May 1841
Henry Martyn Taylor	1898-06-09	6 June 1842 – 16 October 1927
Hugh Stott Taylor	1932-05-05	6 February 1890 – 17 April 1971
J. Roy Taylor	2017-05-05	
James Haward Taylor	1960-03-24	24 February 1909 – 25 January 1968 British Geologist
John Taylor	1825-05-05	22 August 1779 – 5 April 1863
John Bryan Taylor	1970-03-19	
John Clayton Taylor	1981-03-19	Mathematical physicist
John Taylor	1776-05-09	c. 1744 – 8 May 1786 Baronet
John Michael Taylor	1998-05-14	
Martin John Taylor	1996-03-14	
Richard Edward Taylor	1997-05-15	
Richard Lawrence Taylor	1995-03-09	mathematician
Robert Taylor	1737-06-23	April 1710 – 15 May 1762 physician
Thomas Glanville Taylor	1842-02-10	22 November 1804 – 4 May 1848
William Taylor	1934-05-03	11 June 1865 – 28 February 1937 Mechanical Engineer
William Taylor	1836-01-21	? 1870
Thomas Pridgin Teale	1862-06-05	1800 – 31 December 1867 English Surgeon
Thomas Pridgin Teale	1888-06-07	28 June 1831 – 13 November 1923 English Surgeon
Jethro Justinian Harris Teall	1890-06-05	5 January 1849 – 2 July 1924
Michael Teighe	1774-03-10	30 August 1784
George Lewis Teissier	1725-11-04	22 May 1742 Physician
Thomas Telford	1827-05-31	9 August 1757 – 2 September 1834
William Tempest	1712-12-01	16 April 1682 – 15 August 1761 Barrister
George Frederick James Temple	1943-03-18	2 September 1901 – 30 January 1992
Henry John Temple, 3rd Viscount Palmerston	1853-03-17	20 October 1784 – 18 October 1865
Henry Temple, 2nd Viscount Palmerston	1776-11-07	4 December 1739 – 16 April 1802
Richard Temple	1896-03-12	8 March 1826 – 15 March 1902
James Francis Tennant	1869-06-03	10 January 1829 – 6 March 1915
Smithson Tennant	1785-01-13	30 November 1761 – 22 February 1815
John Van Brugh Tennent	1765-06-13	1737–1770 Physician, Princeton Univ.
James Emerson Tennent	1862-06-05	7 April 1804 – 6 March 1869
Eustace Tennyson-d'Eyncourt	1921-05-12	1 April 1868 – 1 February 1951
Charles Tennyson-d'Eyncourt	1829-02-19	July 1784 – 21 July 1861
Alfred, Lord Tennyson	1865-06-01	6 August 1809 – 6 October 1892 Statute 12
Jonathan Tennyson	2009-05-15	Physicist UCL
Christopher Terne	1663-05-20	1620 – 1 December 1673 (Original) Physician, London
Charles Terry	1833-12-05	8 June 1859
Demetri Terzopoulos	2014-04-30	Computer Scientist, University of California, Los Angeles
Marc Trevor Tessier-Lavigne	2001-05-10	Medical Scientist
Rajesh Thakker	2014-04-30	Professor of Medicine, University of Oxford
Margaret Hilda Thatcher, Baroness Thatcher of Kesteven	1983-06-30	13 October 1925 – 8 April 2013 Statute
James Theobald	1725-11-04	20 February 1759
Frederic Thesiger, 1st Baron Chelmsford	1845-06-19	15 April 1794 – 5 October 1878
Louis Jean Le Thieuillier	1750-02-22	1751 French Physician
William Turner Thiselton-Dyer	1880-06-03	28 July 1843 – 23 December 1928
Alexander Thistlethwayte	1757-04-21	c. 1718 – 15 October 1771
David Thoday	1942-03-19	5 May 1883 – 30 March 1964
John Marion Thoday	1965-03-18	30 August 1916 – 25 August 2008
Henry George Thode	1954-03-18	10 September 1910 – 22 March 1997
Frederic de Thom	1729-11-06	fl 1723–1736
Christian David Thomas	2012-04-19	
Edward Thomas	1871-06-08	31 December 1813 – 10 February 1886 Antiquarian
Edward Thomas	1770-06-21	1779
Herbert Henry Thomas	1927-05-12	13 March 1876 – 12 May 1935
Honoratus Leigh Thomas	1806-01-16	26 March 1769 – 26 June 1846 British Physician
Hugh Hamshaw Thomas	1934-05-03	29 May 1885 – 30 June 1962
Hywel Rhys Thomas	2012-04-19	
Jean Olwen Thomas	1986-03-20	
Jennifer Thomas	2017-05-05	
John Meurig Thomas	1977-03-17	
Meirion Thomas	1949-03-17	28 December 1894 – 5 April 1977 Botanist, Newcastle Univ.
Michael Rogers Oldfield Thomas	1901-06-06	21 February 1858 – 16 June 1929
Noah Thomas	1753-01-25	1720 – 17 May 1792 London Physician
Richard Thomas	2015-05-01	Mathematician
Robert Kemeys Thomas	1998-05-14	Physical Chemist, Oxford Univ.
Roger Christopher Thomas	1989-03-16	
Benjamin Thompson, Count Rumford	1779-04-22	26 March 1753 – 25 August 1814
D'Arcy Wentworth Thompson	1916-05-11	2 May 1860 – 21 June 1948
Harold Warris Thompson	1946-03-21	15 February 1908 – 31 December 1983
John Griggs Thompson	1979-03-15	
John Michael Tutill Thompson	1985-03-21	Mechanical Engineer
Peter Thompson	1746-11-20	1770, Kt, English Antiquarian
Robert Henry Stewart Thompson	1974-03-21	2 February 1912 – 16 January 1998 Biochemist
Silvanus Phillips Thompson	1891-06-04	19 June 1851 – 12 June 1916
Theophilus Thompson	1846-01-22	20 September 1807 – 11 August 1860 Physician
Thomas Perronet Thompson	1828-11-20	15 March 1783 – 6 September 1869
William Robin Thompson	1933-05-11	29 June 1887 – 30 January 1972 Canadian biologist
Alexander Thomson	1786-02-09	1744 – 15 April 1817 Lawyer
Allen Thomson	1848-06-09	2 April 1809 – 21 March 1884
Andrew James Thomson	1993-03-11	
George Paget Thomson	1930-05-15	3 May 1892 – 10 September 1975
James Thomson	1821-12-20	6 February 1779 – 17 September 1850
James Thomson	1877-06-07	16 February 1822 – 8 May 1892 Engineer
John Thomson	1824-06-03	15 March 1765 – 11 October 1846 Physician
John Deas Thomson	1820-11-16	c. 1763 – 21 February 1838
John Millar Thomson	1897-06-03	7 March 1849 – 22 March 1933
Joseph John Thomson	1884-06-12	18 December 1856 – 30 August 1940
Robert Dundas Thomson	1854-06-01	21 September 1810 – 17 August 1864
Samuel Wells Thomson	1770-11-08	c. 1740 – ? September 1778
Thomas Thomson	1811-03-28	12 April 1773 – 2 July 1852
Thomas Thomson	1855-06-07	4 December 1817 – 18 April 1878
William Thomson	1786-03-16	1761 – Physician
William Thomson	1863-02-19	11 February 1819 – 25 December 1890
William Thomson, 1st Baron Kelvin	1851-06-05	26 June 1824 – 17 December 1907
Wyville Thomas Charles Thomson	1869-06-03	5 March 1830 – 10 March 1882
Ralph Thoresby	1697-11-30	16 August 1658 – 16 October 1725
Richard Thorne Thorne	1890-06-05	13 October 1841 – 18 December 1899
James Thornhill	1723-05-02	1675 – 13 May 1734
Edward Thornton	1810-06-07	22 October 1766 – 3 July 1852
Henry Gerard Thornton	1941-03-20	22 January 1892 – 6 February 1977 UK Microbiologist
Henry Sykes Thornton	1834-04-10	28 May 1800 – 29 November 1881
Janet Maureen Thornton	1999-05-13	
John Isaac Thornycroft	1893-06-01	1 February 1843 – 28 June 1928
Charles Thorp	1839-05-30	13 October 1783 – 10 October 1862
Jocelyn Field Thorpe	1908-05-07	1 December 1872 – 10 June 1940
John Thorpe	1705-11-30	12 March 1682 – 30 November 1750 antiquarian
Stephen Austen Thorpe	1991-03-14	
Thomas Edward Thorpe	1876-06-01	8 December 1845 – 23 February 1925
William Homan Thorpe	1951-03-15	1 April 1902 – 7 April 1986
David James Thouless	1979-03-15	21 September 1934 – 6 April 2019
Richard Threlfall	1899-06-01	14 August 1861 – 10 July 1932
Brian Arthur Thrush	1976-03-18	
Malachy Thruston	1665-05-17	c. 1628 – 3 June 1701 Physician
Henry Edward Landor Thuillier	1869-06-03	10 July 1813 – 6 May 1906 Surveyor-General of India
Carl Peter Thunberg	1788-04-03	11 November 1743 – 8 August 1828
George Augustus Thursby	1816-07-04	c. 1771 – 17 January 1836 Reverend
George Henry Kendrick Thwaites	1865-06-01	1811 – 11 September 1882 Botanist & Entomologist
Thomas Thynne, 1st Viscount Weymouth	1664-11-23	? October 1640 – 28 July 1714
John Lewis Tiarks	1825-03-03	10 May 1789 – 1 May 1837 Astronomer
Robert Tibshirani	2019-04-16	10 July 1956 –
Cheryll Anne Tickle	1998-05-14	
Friedrich Tiedemann	1832-06-09	23 August 1781 – 22 January 1861
Oscar Werner Tiegs	1944-03-16	12 March 1897 – 5 November 1956 Australian zoologist
Mark Aloysius Tierney	1841-02-25	September 1795 – 19 February 1862
Richard Tighe	1708-11-30	1678 – 27 July 1736
Robert Stearne Tighe	1793-04-18	3 March 1760 – 28 May 1835 Antiquarian
William Augustus Tilden	1880-06-03	15 August 1842 – 11 December 1926
Shirley Marie Tilghman	1995-03-09	
James Edgar Till	2000-05-11	
Cecil Edgar Tilley	1938-03-17	14 May 1894 – 24 January 1973
Michelangelo Tilli	1708-11-30	1655–1740 Italian Physician & Botanist
Ulrike Louise Tillmann	2008-05-16	
John Tillotson	1672-01-25	? October 1630 – 22 November 1694
Robin John Tillyard	1925-05-07	31 January 1881 – 13 January 1937
George Tilson	1735-05-22	c. 1672 – 17 November 1738
Kenneth Nigel Timmis	2008-05-16	Microbiologist
Emanuele Timone	1703-11-30	1665–1741
Nikolaas Tinbergen	1962-03-25	15 April 1907 – 21 December 1988
Anthony Tissington	1767-01-29	1703 – 21 March 1776
Simon Andre Tissot	1760-03-20	20 March 1728 – 15 June 1797
Edward Charles Titchmarsh	1931-05-07	1 June 1899 – 18 January 1963
William Tite	1835-04-02	February 1798 – 20 April 1873
Isaac Titsingh	1797-06-22	? 1740 – 9 February 1812 Dutch physician.
Silas Titus	1669-01-14	c. 1623 – December 1704 Politician.
Henry Thomas Tizard	1926-05-06	23 August 1885 – 9 October 1959
Thomas Henry Tizard	1891-06-04	13 March 1839 – 17 February 1924
Giuseppe Toaldo	1777-06-05	11 July 1719 – 11 November 1797
Phillip Vallentine Tobias	1996-03-14	14 October 1925 – 7 June 2012 Anatomist
Alexander Robertus Todd, Baron Todd of Trumpington	1942-03-19	2 October 1907 – 10 January 1997
Charles Todd	1930-05-15	17 September 1869 – ? 23 September 1957 Immunologist
Charles Todd	1889-06-06	7 July 1826 – 29 January 1910
John Arthur Todd	1948-03-18	23 August 1908 – 22 December 1994
John Andrew Todd	2009-05-15	Geneticist, Cambridge Univ.
Robert Bentley Todd	1838-02-08	? 7 April 1809 – 30 January 1860 physician
Isaac Todhunter	1862-06-05	23 November 1820 – 1 March 1884
Alexander Logie du Toit	1943-03-18	14 March 1878 – 25 February 1948
Petrus Johann du Toit	1951-03-15	16 March 1888 – 13 November 1967
John Francis Toland	1999-05-13	
Samuel Tolansky	1952-03-20	17 November 1907 – 4 March 1973 spectroscopist
Wilbraham Tollemache, 6th Earl of Dysart	1805-11-07	23 October 1739 – 9 March 1821
David Tollervey	2004-05-27	
George Tollet	1713-06-11	c. 1684 – 30 November 1714
Charles Sissmore Tomes	1878-06-06	6 June 1846 – 24 October 1928
John Tomes	1850-06-06	21 March 1815 – 29 July 1895
George Pretyman Tomline	1785-03-17	9 October 1750 – 14 November 1827
William Edward Tomline	1812-11-19	c. 1786 – 28 May 1836
Charles Tomlinson	1867-06-06	27 November 1808 – 15 February 1897
Herbert Tomlinson	1889-06-06	18 November 1846 – 12 June 1931
Ian Tomlinson	2019-04-16	
Frederick Clifford Tompkins	1955-03-17	29 August 1910 – 5 November 1995
Robert Tompson	1702-05-06	c. 1676 – ? August 1713
Nicholas Kester Tonks	2001-05-10	Microbiologist, Dundee Univ.
Andrew Tooke	1704-11-30	1673 – 20 January 1732
Thomas Tooke	1821-03-22	29 February 1774 – 26 February 1858
William Tooke	1783-06-05	? 29 January 1744 – 17 November 1820
William Tooke	1818-03-12	22 November 1777 – 20 September 1863
John Tooze	1994-03-10	Cancer Research, Imperial Cancer Research Fund
John Topham	1779-04-15	6 January 1746 – 19 August 1803
William Topley	1888-06-07	13 March 1841 – 30 September 1894
William Whiteman Carlton Topley	1930-05-15	19 January 1886 – 21 January 1944
Justus Johann Torkos	1752-01-16	17 December 1699 – 29 October 1771
Philip Torr	2021-05-06	
Robert Torrens	1818-12-17	1780 – 27 May 1864
Joseph Ignacio de Torres	1758-12-07	1807
Alexander Torriano	1691-11-30	2 October 1667 – February 1717
Francesco Torti	1717-11-14	30 November 1658 – 15 February 1741
Giulio Carlo de' Toschi di Fagnano	1723-11-30	6 December 1682 – 26 September 1766
Burt James Totaro	2009-05-15	
Charles Tough	1750-02-22	c. 1692 – 21 June 1754
Christofer Toumazou	2008-05-16	
Charles Towneley	1842-11-17	8 January 1803 – 4 November 1876
John Towneley	1797-05-04	fl 1797–1814 Trustee, British Museum
Peregrine Edward Towneley	1812-12-17	c. 1763 – 31 December 1847
Charles Townley	1791-03-10	1 October 1737 – 3 January 1805
George Townley	1822-11-07	c. 1777 – 3 November 1854
Alain Robert Michael Townsend	1992-03-12	
Albert Alan Townsend	1960-03-24	
Isaac Townsend	1750-02-22	21 November 1765
John Sealy Edward Townsend	1903-06-11	7 June 1868 – 16 February 1957
Paul Kingsley Townsend	2000-05-11	
Richard Townsend	1866-06-07	3 April 1821 – 16 October 1884 Irish mathematician.
Charles Townshend, 2nd Viscount Townshend	1706-04-03	18 April 1675 – 21 June 1738
George Townshend, 2nd Marquess Townshend	1781-02-15	18 April 1755 – 27 July 1811
Joseph Toynbee	1842-03-10	30 December 1815 – 7 July 1866
Bruno Tozzi	1715-11-30	1656–1743 Botanist
John Montgomery Traherne	1823-05-29	5 October 1788 – 5 February 1860
James William Helenus Trail	1893-06-01	4 March 1851 – 18 September 1919
Ramsay Heatley Traquair	1881-06-02	30 July 1840 – 24 November 1912
Francesco Travagino	1676-02-10	c. 1613 – Mathematician
Benjamin Travers	1815-11-16	3 April 1783 – 6 March 1858
Morris William Travers	1904-05-05	24 January 1872 – 25 August 1961
Lloyd Nicholas Trefethen	2005-05-26	
Anne Marie Treisman	1989-03-16	
Richard Henry Treisman	1994-03-10	
Scott Duncan Tremaine	1994-03-10	
Abraham Trembley	1743-05-19	3 September 1710 – 12 May 1784
David Rostron Trentham	1982-03-18	
John William Trevan	1946-03-21	23 July 1887 – 13 October 1956
George Macaulay Trevelyan	1950-05-18	16 February 1876 – 21 July 1962 Statute 12
John Trevor, 3rd Baron Trevor of Bromham	1728-11-14	? August 1695 – 27 September 1764
Robert Trevor, Viscount Hampden	1764-12-13	17 February 1706 – 22 August 1783
Thomas Trevor, 1st Baron Trevor of Bromham	1707-12-01	8 March 1658 – 19 June 1730
Thomas Trevor, 2nd Baron Trevor of Bromham	1727-03-09	c. 1692 – 22 March 1753
Christoph Jacob Trew	1746-04-17	26 April 1696 – 18 July 1769
Anthony James Trewavas	1999-05-13	
Mårten Triewald	1731-07-01	18 November 1691 – 8 August 1747
Henry Trimen	1888-06-07	26 October 1843 – 16 October 1896
Roland Trimen	1883-06-07	29 October 1840 – 25 July 1916
Henry Baker Tristram	1868-06-04	11 May 1822 – 8 March 1906
Théodore Tronchin	1762-03-18	1709 – 30 November 1781
Nicolo Troni	1715-11-10	1685–1772
John Trotter	1802-07-08	c. 1766 – 6 September 1833
Wilfred Batten Lewis Trotter	1931-05-07	3 November 1872 – 25 November 1939
Edward Troughton	1810-03-15	October 1753 – 12 June 1835
Robert Scott Troup	1926-05-06	13 December 1874 – 1 October 1939
Frederick Thomas Trouton	1897-06-03	24 November 1863 – 21 September 1922
Neil Sidney Trudinger	1997-03-15	
Arthur Elijah Trueman	1942-03-19	26 April 1894 – 5 January 1956
William Trumbull	1692-11-30	6 September 1639 – 14 December 1716
Charles Brandon Trye	1807-12-17	21 August 1757 – 7 October 1811
Lap-Chee Tsui	1991-03-14	
George Foster Tufnell	1758-04-20	1723 – 10 July 1788
Samuel Tufnell	1709-05-04	5 September 1682 – 21 December 1758 MP for Maldon, Colchester and Gt Marlow
Samuel Tuke	1663-05-20	26 January 1674 Original
Charles Augustus Tulk	1822-11-14	2 June 1786 – 16 January 1849
James Tulloch	1843-05-18	? 1863
Endel Tulving	1992-03-12	
Marmaduke Tunstall	1771-04-11	1743 – 11 October 1790
Martin Tupper	1835-02-05	1780 – 8 December 1844
Martin Farquhar Tupper	1845-04-10	17 July 1810 – 29 November 1889
François Henri Turbilly	1762-04-22	1712–1776
Alan Mathison Turing	1951-03-15	23 June 1912 – 7 June 1954
Douglass Matthew Turnbull	2019-04-16	
Alan Turnbull	2013-05-02	
Herbert Westren Turnbull	1932-05-05	31 August 1885 – 4 May 1961
Hubert Maitland Turnbull	1939-03-16	3 March 1875 – 29 September 1955
John Turnbull	1791-11-17	c. 1740 – 8 August 1816
Peter Evan Turnbull	1817-06-05	1786 – ? 7 October 1852
Thomas Smith Turnbull	1831-03-17	c. July 1794 – 24 March 1876
Adair Turner, Baron Turner of Ecchinswell	2016-04-29	Honorary fellow
Bryan M. Turner	2015-05-01	Geneticist
Charles Hampden Turner	1821-05-24	17 March 1856
David Warren Turner	1973-03-15	
Dawson Turner	1802-12-09	18 October 1775 – 20 June 1858
Edmond Turner	1714-03-11	fl 1710–1722
Edward Turner	1830-03-04	24 June 1796 – 12 February 1837 Prof of Chemistry Univ of London
Eustace Ebenezer Turner	1939-03-16	22 May 1893 – 8 September 1966
George James Turner	1865-03-16	5 February 1798 – 9 July 1867
Grenville Turner	1980-03-20	
Herbert Hall Turner	1897-06-03	13 August 1861 – 20 August 1930
James Johnson Turner	1992-03-12	
(John) Stewart Turner	1982-03-18	11 January 1930 – Australian geophysicist
Samuel Turner	1801-01-15	(19 April 1759 – 2 January 1802 Captain, East India Co.
Samuel Turner	1815-12-21	fl 1815
Shallet Turner	1741-03-26	? September 1692 – 13 November 1762
Tomkyns Hilgrove Turner	1804-12-06	12 January 1764 – 7 May 1843
William Turner	1877-06-07	7 January 1832 – 15 February 1916 Prof of Anatomy, Edinburgh
William Ernest Stephen Turner	1938-03-17	22 September 1881 – 27 October 1963
Charles Turnor	1839-05-09	10 August 1768 – 12 January 1853
Edmund Turnor	1786-06-15	1755–1829 MP for Midhurst
John Turnor	1682-11-08	c. 1660 – 10 July 1719
William Bertram Turrill	1958-03-20	14 June 1890 – 15 December 1961
John Turton	1763-11-17	15 November 1735 – 14 April 1806
Edward William Tuson	1838-04-05	25 March 1802 – 10 December 1865 Surgeon
George Leman Tuthill	1810-03-15	16 February 1772 – 7 April 1835
Thomas Gaskell Tutin	1982-03-18	21 April 1908 – 7 October 1987
Winifred Anne Tutin	1979-03-15	8 October 1915 – 1 May 2007
William Thomas Tutte	1987-03-19	14 May 1917 – 2 May 2002
Alfred Edwin Howard Tutton	1899-06-01	22 August 1864 – 14 July 1938
Alexander Tweedie	1838-02-08	29 August 1794 – 30 May 1884
Charles Tweedie	1819-01-14	fl 1799–1821
Peter John Twin	1993-03-11	
Richard Twining	1834-06-05	5 May 1772 – 14 October 1857 Tea merchant
Richard Twiss	1774-06-09	26 April 1747 – 5 March 1821 Traveller and writer
Travers Twiss	1838-03-15	19 March 1809 – 14 January 1897
Frederick William Twort	1929-05-02	22 October 1877 – 30 March 1950
Frank Twyman	1924-05-15	17 November 1876 – 6 March 1959
John Maxwell Tylden	1820-04-13	25 September 1787 – 18 May 1866 Army Officer
John Tylney, 2nd Earl Tylney of Castlemaine	1746-12-11	? 1712 – 17 September 1784
Edward Burnett Tylor	1871-06-08	2 October 1832 – 2 January 1917
Arthur Mannering Tyndall	1933-05-11	18 September 1881 – 29 October 1961
John Tyndall	1852-06-03	2 August 1820 – 4 December 1893
Thomas Tyndall	1762-11-11	7 September 1766
Charles John Kemys Tynte	1834-12-18	9 April 1800 – 16 September 1882
David Arthur John Tyrrell	1970-03-19	19 June 1925 – 2 May 2005
Thomas Tyrwhitt	1771-02-28	27 March 1730 – 15 August 1786
Edward Tyson	1679-12-01	1650 – 1 August 1708
Michael Tyson	1779-02-11	19 November 1740 – 4 May 1780

=== U ===
Name	Election date	Notes
Carlo Ubaldini, Count of Montefeltri	1667-11-21	1665–1667
Alfred Rene Jean Paul Ubbelohde	1951-03-15	14 December 1907 – 7 January 1988 Chemist (carbon)
Robert Udny	1785-06-16	c. 1725 – 8 January 1802 Collector
Frank Uhlmann	2015-05-01	Biochemist
Antonio de Ulloa	1746-12-11	12 January 1716 – 5 July 1795 Spanish admiral, explorer & astronomer
Eric John Underwood	1970-03-19	7 September 1905 – 19 August 1980
William George Unruh	2001-05-10	
Peter Nigel Tripp Unwin	1983-03-17	Molecular Biology, MRC
William Cawthorne Unwin	1886-06-04	12 December 1838 – 17 March 1933
Fulke Greville Upton	1803-02-10	3 April 1773 – 4 March 1846 Later surnamed Howard. MP for Castle Rising
John Upton	1757-06-16	27 December 1718 – ? 1784 Barrister
Benjamin d'Urban	1825-03-10	1777 – 25 May 1849
Andrew Ure	1821-12-13	18 May 1778 – 2 January 1857
Fritz Joseph Ursell	1972-03-16	28 April 1923 – 11 May 2012
Henry Ussher	1785-11-24	8 May 1790 Prof of Astronomy, Dublin
Boris Petrovich Uvarov	1950-03-16	5 November 1889 – 18 March 1970

=== V ===
Name	Election date	Notes
Victor Beaufort Vabres de Fresars	1663-07-15	1663–1674
Thomas Vage	1779-02-25	– 1815
Michaele Bernado Valentini	1715-11-10	26 November 1657 – 18 March 1729
Éamon de Valera	1968-05-30	14 October 1882 – 29 August 1975 Statute
Leslie Gabriel Valiant	1991-03-14	computer scientist, parallel computation
Antonio Valisnieri	1703-11-30	3 May 1661 – 18 January 1730
Patrick Vallance	2017-05-05	
Charles Vallancey	1786-05-04	1721 – 8 August 1812
Rudolph de Valltravers	1755-06-12	April 1723 –
Johann Weikhard, Freiherr von Valvasor	1687-12-14	20 May 1641 – September 1693, Slovenian polymath
Veronica Van Heyningen	2007-05-17	
John Robert Vane	1974-03-21	29 March 1927 – 19 November 2004 medicine, Nobel Prize (1982)
Nicholas Vansittart, Baron Bexley	1822-02-07	29 April 1766 – 8 February 1851
Srinivasa Varadhan	1998-05-14	mathematics, Abel Prize (2007)
Pierre Varignon	1714-07-29	1654 – 22 December 1722
Rajeev Kumar Varshney	2023-07-14	Agricultural Scientist, Genomics, Pre-Breeding, Food Security
Cromwell Fleetwood Varley	1871-06-08	6 April 1828 – 2 September 1883
Michael Le Vassor	1702-01-14	c. 1648 – October 1718
Abraham Vater	1722-03-15	9 December 1684 – 18 November 1751
Janet Maria Vaughan	1979-03-15	18 October 1899 – 9 January 1993
John Vaughan, 3rd Earl of Carbery	1685-01-21	? July 1639 – 12 January 1713
Robert Charles Vaughan	1990-03-15	
William Vaughan	1813-06-24	22 September 1752 – 5 May 1850 Merchant
Theodore de Vaux	1665-05-10	c. 1628 – 26 May 1694
William Sandys Wright Vaux	1868-06-04	28 February 1818 – 21 June 1885
Nicolas Vay de Vaja	1787-11-22	? 1803
John Cristopher Vederas	2009-05-15	
Victor Herbert Veley	1894-06-07	10 February 1856 – 20 August 1933
August Ferdinand Veltheim	1795-04-16	18 September 1741 – 2 October 1801
James Venables	1707-12-01	6 May 1737
John Venn	1883-06-07	4 August 1834 – 4 April 1923
Akshay Venkatesh	2019-04-16	21 November 1981 –
Marsilio Venturi	1751-06-06	1783
Filippo Venuti	1759-06-14	1709–1769
Ridolfino Venuti	1757-03-17	1705 – 30 March 1763
George Frederic Verdon	1870-06-02	21 January 1834 – 13 September 1896
Louis Elizabeth de la Vergne, Count of Tressan	1750-02-08	4 November 1705 – 31 October 1783
Cornelius Vermuyden	1663-05-20	? March 1627 – 1693 Original
Ernest Basil Verney	1936-05-07	22 August 1894 – 19 August 1967
Ralph Verney, 2nd Earl Verney	1758-04-20	c. 1712 – 31 March 1791
Edward Vernon	1724-03-12	c. 1695 – March 1761 Antiquarian
Francis Vernon	1672-05-22	c. 1637–1677
James Vernon	1702-05-06	c. 1677–1756 Diplomat, MP
Martin Paterson Vessey	1991-03-14	
James Vetch	1830-05-06	13 May 1789 – 7 December 1869
Henry de Vic	1662-05-07	c. 1599 – 20 November 1671 Ambassador to France
Keith Vickerman	1984-03-15	
Victoria, Queen of the United Kingdom of Great Britain and Ireland, Empress of India	1838-06-20	24 May 1819 – 22 January 1901 Patron
Mathukumalli Vidyasagar	2012-04-19	
Raymond Vieussens	1688-11-30	c. 1635 – 16 August 1715
Krishnaswamy VijayRaghavan	2012-04-19	
Charles Blacker Vignoles	1855-06-07	31 May 1793 – 17 November 1875
Pierre de Vigny	1741-12-10	1741
Nicholas Aylward Vigors	1826-02-23	1785 – 26 October 1840
Bernard Germain Etienne de la Ville-sur-Illon, Count of Lacepede	1806-04-17	26 December 1756 – 6 October 1825
Esprit Cabart de Villermont	1685-05-13	c. 1617 – 16 October 1707
Charles Pelham Villiers	1865-11-23	3 January 1802 – 16 January 1898
George Villiers, 2nd Duke of Buckingham	1661-06-05	30 January 1628 – 16 April 1687 Original
Jean-Baptiste-Gaspard d'Ansse de Villoison	1776-06-06	? 5 March 1750 – 25 April 1805
Samuel Vince	1786-06-22	6 April 1749 – 28 November 1821
Angela Carmen Vincent	2011-05-19	
Edgar Vincent, 1st Viscount D'Abernon	1934-11-01	19 August 1857 – 1 November 1941 Statute
Levinus Vincent	1715-06-09	1658 – 8 November 1728
Jean-Paul Vincent	2013-05-02	
Nathaniel Vincent	1683-11-30	May 1722 Clergyman
Frederick John Vine	1974-03-21	
William Frank Vinen	1973-03-15	
Sydney Howard Vines	1885-06-04	31 December 1849 – 4 April 1934
Tejinder Singh Virdee	2012-04-19	
Peter Visscher	2018-05-09	
John Henry Vivian	1823-01-09	9 August 1785 – 10 February 1855
Richard Hussey Vivian, Baron Vivian	1841-02-11	28 July 1775 – 20 August 1842
Vincenzo Viviani	1696-04-29	5 April 1622 – 22 September 1703
John Christopher Augustus Voelcker	1870-06-02	24 September 1822 – 5 December 1884
Marthe Louise Vogt	1952-03-20	8 September 1903 – 8 September 2003
Otto Christoph Volckra, Count of Heidenreichstein	1716-04-05	27 March 1734
Alessandro Volta	1791-05-05	19 February 1745 – 5 March 1827
Francois Marie Arouet de Voltaire	1743-11-03	21 November 1694 – 30 May 1778
Isaacus Vossius	1664-04-20	1618 – 21 February 1689
Karen Heather Vousden	2003-05-15	
Wilhelm Van Vrijberge	1706-06-05	1656 – 3 July 1711
William Vyse	1781-05-17	c. 1742 – 20 February 1816
Richard Rawlinson Vyvyan	1826-06-08	6 June 1800 – 15 August 1879

== Foreign members ==
=== S ===
Name	Election date	Notes
Paul Sabatier	1918-02-28	5 November 1859 – 14 August 1941
Julius von Sachs	1888-05-31	2 October 1832 – 29 May 1897 German founder of experimental plant physiology
Bert Sakmann	1994-06-09	
Edwin Ernest Salpeter	1993-06-17	Austrian-born Australian U.S. astronomer
Bengt Ingemar Samuelsson	1990-06-28	
Allan Rex Sandage	2001-05-10	
Philippe Sansonetti	2014-04-30	1949–
José Sarukhán	2003-05-15	
Joachim Sauer	2018-05-09	19 April 1949
Nicolas Theodore de Saussure	1820-03-23	14 October 1767 – 18 April 1845
Félix Savart	1839-05-30	30 June 1791 – 16 March 1841
Adi Shamir	2018-05-09	6 July 1952 –
Randy Schekman	2013-05-02	
Giovanni Virginio Schiaparelli	1896-11-26	14 March 1835 – 4 July 1910
Knut Schmidt-Nielsen	1985-06-27	24 September 1915 – 25 January 2007
Richard Royce Schrock	2008-05-16	
Erwin Schrödinger	1949-05-12	12 August 1887 – 4 January 1961
Heinrich Christian Schumacher	1821-04-12	3 September 1780 – 28 December 1850
Samuel Heinrich Schwabe	1868-03-26	25 October 1789 – 11 April 1875
Theodor Ambrose Hubert Schwann	1879-04-03	7 December 1810 – 11 January 1882
Martin Schwarzschild	1996-03-14	31 May 1912 – 10 April 1997 German-born U.S. astronomer
Simon Schwendener	1913-06-26	10 February 1829 – 27 May 1919
Glenn Theodore Seaborg	1985-06-27	20 April 1912 – 25 February 1999
Angelo Secchi	1856-11-20	29 June 1818 – 26 February 1878
Nikolai Nikolaevich Semenov	1958-04-24	16 April 1896 – 25 September 1986
Jean-Pierre Serre	1974-04-25	
Igor Rostislavovich Shafarevich	1981-04-09	
Claude Elwood Shannon	1991-06-20	30 April 1916 – 24 February 2001
Philip Allen Sharp	2011-05-19	6 June 1944 -
Carla J. Shatz	2011-05-19	
Karl Theodor Ernst von Siebold	1858-11-25	16 February 1804 – 7 April 1885
Karl Manne Georg Siegbahn	1954-04-29	3 December 1886 – 26 September 1978
George Gaylord Simpson	1958-04-24	16 June 1902 – 6 October 1984
Yakov Sinai	2009-05-15	
Theobald Smith	1932-06-02	31 July 1859 – 10 December 1934
Oliver Smithies	1998-05-14	
Hermann Graf zu Solms-Laubach	1902-11-27	23 December 1842 – 24 November 1915
Susan Solomon	2008-05-16	
Arnold Johannes Wilhelm Sommerfeld	1926-04-29	5 December 1868 – 26 April 1951
Samuel Thomas Sommering	1827-03-15	? 25 January 1755 – 2 March 1830
Tracy Morton Sonneborn	1964-04-23	19 October 1905 – 26 January 1981
John Charles Howorth Spence	2015	Physicist
Roger Wolcott Sperry	1976-04-08	20 August 1913 – 17 April 1994
Lyman Spitzer	1990-06-28	26 June 1914 – 31 March 1997
Jean-Servais Stas	1879-04-03	? 20 September 1813 – 13 December 1891
Brian Staskawicz	2019-04-16	
George Ledyard Stebbins	1999-05-13	6 January 1906 – 19 January 2000
Johannes Japetus Smith Steenstrup	1863-06-18	8 March 1813 – 20 June 1897
Joan Steitz	2014-04-30	26 January 1941 –
Thomas Steitz	2011-05-19	
Erik Helge Oswald Stensio	1946-05-09	2 October 1891 – 11 January 1984
Joseph Eugene Stiglitz	2009-05-15	
Francisco de Borja Garcao Stockler	1819-04-01	1759 – 6 March 1829
Arthur Stoll	1958-04-24	8 January 1887 – 13 January 1971
Edward Manin Stolper	2011-05-19	
Henry Melson Stommel	1983-06-30	27 September 1920 – 16 January 1992
Gilbert Stork	1999-05-13	Belgian-born U.S. organic chemist
Frederik Carl Mulertz Stormer	1951-04-19	3 September 1874 – 13 August 1957
Eduard Adolf Strasburger	1891-11-26	1 February 1844 – 19 May 1912, German professor
Friedrich Stromeyer	1827-03-15	2 August 1776 – 18 August 1835
Otto Wilhelm Struve	1873-11-27	7 May 1819 – 14 April 1905
Jacob Karl Franz Sturm	1840-06-04	29 September 1803 – 18 December 1855
Thomas C. Südhof	2017-05-05	
Eduard Suess	1894-04-26	20 August 1831 – 25 April 1914
Rashid Sunyaev	2009-05-15	
Theodor Svedberg	1944-06-15	? 13 August 1884 – ? 26 February 1971
Nils Eberhard Svedelius	1944-06-15	5 August 1873 – 2 August 1960
Janos Szentagothai	1978-04-20	31 October 1912 – 8 September 1994

=== T ===
Name	Election date	Notes
Clifford James Tabin	2014-04-30	19 January 1954 –
Pietro Tacchini	1891-11-26	21 March 1838 – 24 March 1905
Steven Dale Tanksley	2009-05-15	
Jean-Marie Tarascon	2014-04-30	Chemist, Collège de France
Henry Taube	1988-06-30	30 November 1915 – 16 November 2005
Pafnuti Livowitsch Tchebitchef	1877-12-13	14 May 1821 – 26 November 1894
Valentine Louis Telegdi	2003-05-15	10 January 1922 – 8 April 2006 Hungarian-born Switzerland U.S. physicist
Howard Martin Temin	1988-06-30	12 October 1934 – 9 February 1994 U.S. scientist, retroviruses, Nobel Prize (1975)
Louis Jacques Thénard	1824-12-09	4 May 1777 – 20 June 1857
Hans Peter Jørgen Julius Thomsen	1902-11-27	16 February 1826 – 13 February 1909
Axel Hugo Theodor Theorell	1959-04-23	6 July 1903 – 15 August 1982
Kenneth Vivian Thimann	1969-04-24	5 August 1904 – 15 January 1997
G. David Tilman	2017-05-05	
Kliment Arkadyevich Timiryazev	1911-11-09	3 June 1843 – 28 April 1920 Botanist, Croonian Lecture 1903
Stephen Prokofievitch Timoshenko	1944-06-15	23 December 1878 – 29 May 1972
Arne Wilhelm Kaurin Tiselius	1957-05-09	10 August 1902 – 29 October 1971
Charles Hard Townes	1976-04-08	
Melchior Treub	1899-06-01	5 December 1851 – 3 October 1910
Roger Yonchien Tsien	2006-05-18	1 February 1952 – 24 August 2016
John Wilder Tukey	1991-06-20	16 June 1915 – 26 July 2000 U.S. statistician

=== U ===
Name	Election date	Notes
Harold Clayton Urey	1947-05-01	29 April 1893 – 5 January 1981
Hans Henriksen Ussing	1984-06-28	30 December 1911 – 21 December 2000

=== V ===
Name	Election date	Notes
Harold Eliot Varmus	2005-05-26	U.S. scientist, Nobel Prize for Medicine (1989)
Louis Nicholas Vauquelin	1823-12-11	16 May 1763 – ? 15 November 1829
Nicholas Ivanovich Vavilov	1942-06-18	26 November 1887 – 26 January 1943
Felix Andries Vening Meinesz	1936-06-25	30 July 1887 – 10 August 1966
Phillippe Edouard Poulletier de Verneuil	1860-05-24	13 February 1805 – 29 May 1873
Urbain Jean Joseph Le Verrier	1847-02-04	11 March 1811 – 23 September 1877
Ivan Matveevich Vinogradov	1942-06-18	14 September 1891 – 24 March 1983
Rudolf Ludwig Karl Virchow	1884-01-31	13 October 1821 – 5 September 1902
John Hasbrouck Van Vleck	1967-04-20	13 March 1899 – 27 October 1980
Woldemar Voigt	1913-06-26	2 September 1850 – 13 December 1919
Vito Volterra	1910-06-30	3 May 1860 – 11 October 1940
Hugo De Vries	1905-05-11	10 February 1848 – 21 May 1935
