= List of fellows of the Royal Society elected in 1984 =

This is a list of fellows of the Royal Society elected in 1984.

== Fellows ==
- John Alan Gulland (1926–1990)
- Denis Henry Desty (1923–1994)
- James Griffiths Howard (1927–1998)
- Frank Brian Mercer (1927–1998)
- Hans Henriksen Ussing (1911–2000)
- Edward Raymond Andrew (1921–2001)
- Gordon Lowe (1933–2003)
- William Parry (1934–2006)
- Pierre-Gilles de Gennes (1932–2007)
- Sir Gareth Gwyn Roberts (1940–2007)
- George Emil Palade (d. 2008)
- Robert Geoffrey Edwards (1925–2013)
- Obaid Siddiqi (1932–2013)
- Sir Michael John Berridge
- Sir Tom Leon Blundell
- Quentin Bone
- Christopher Reuben Calladine
- David Edgar Cartwright
- Sir Philip Cohen
- George Alan Martin Cross
- Sir David Evan Naunton Davies
- Richard Anthony Flavell
- Sir Brian Keith Follett
- Roald Hoffmann
- Ernest Demetrios Hondros
- John Henderson Knox
- Sir John Richard Krebs
- Ronald Alfred Laskey
- Sir Alistair George James MacFarlane
- Peter Michael Maitlis
- Matthew Stanley Meselson
- Takeshi Oka
- Charles Barry Osmond
- Sir John Brian Pendry
- Richard Nelson Perham
- Frank Henry Read
- Carlo Rubbia
- Ian Alexander Shanks
- Sir John James Skehel
- Frank Thomas Smith
- Christopher Hubert Llewellyn Smith
- Michael James Stowell
- Keith Vickerman
- David Williams
- Michael Mark Woolfson
- Peter John Wyllie
