= Ussing =

Ussing is a surname. Notable people with the surname include:

- Elisa Ussing (1885–1949), Danish lawyer
- Gregers Algreen-Ussing (born 1938), Danish architect
- Hans Ussing (1911–2000), Danish scientist
  - Ussing chamber, apparatus for measuring epithelial membrane properties
- Niels Viggo Ussing (1864–1911), Danish mineralogist
- Olaf Ussing (1907–1990), Danish film actor
- Susanne Ussing (1940–1998), Danish artist
