= Andrew Cantwell =

Irish academic (??–1764)

Andrew Cantwell (died 1764) was an Irish academic in France and medical writer, known as an opponent of inoculation.

== Life ==
Cantwell was born in Tipperary, and studied medicine at the University of Montpellier, where he graduated in 1729. Having failed in 1732 to secure the succession to the chair of medicine which had been left vacant by Jean Astruc's migration to Paris, he also left for Paris in 1733. After going through a further course of study there, he graduated M.D. of Paris in 1742.

In 1750 Cantwell was appointed at Paris professor of surgery in the Latin language, and in 1760 he became professor of the same subject in French; in 1762 he became professor of pharmacy. He was a Fellow of the Royal Society of London, elected 1738, and died at Paris 11 July 1764.

== Works ==
The Paris disputation of 1742 written by Cantwell was under Jacques Albert Hazon (1708–1779), and concerned treatment for the stone with alkalis. It examined the lithontriptic remedies of Joanna Stephens, indicating some positive outcomes of trials. Cantwell had translated a paper from 1740 by Stephen Hales in this area into French; and went on to translate work of Hans Sloane on the eyes.

Cantwell became a persistent opponent of inoculation against small-pox, and made an extended stay in England to study the practice and its results. He took issue with the favourable views of James Jurin and Charles Marie de La Condamine. He wrote a Dissertation on Inoculation (Paris, 1755), an Account of Small-pox (Paris, 1758), and Latin dissertations on medicine. His Faits concluans contre l'inoculation pointed to risks that other diseases could be transmitted by inoculation; a rebuttal from the College of Physicians of London mentioned Cantwell's loss of a daughter to smallpox.

The Dictionnaire historique de la médecine of Nicolas Éloy of 1778, and the Nouvelle Biographie Générale of 1855, list other works. Contributions by Cantwell are in the Philosophical Transactions, vols. xl. xli. xlii. They include papers on ophthalmology: a letter to Thomas Stack, and a report on the work of Jacques Daviel.

== Family ==
His son Andrew Samuel Michael Cantwell (1744–1802) was known as a librarian and translator in France. He translated many English works into French.

== Notes ==
Attribution

This article incorporates text from a publication now in the public domain: Stephen, Leslie, ed. (1886). "Cantwell, Andrew". Dictionary of National Biography. Vol. 8. London: Smith, Elder & Co.
