= Strausfeld =

Surname

Strausfeld is a surname. Notable people with the surname include:

- Lisa Strausfeld (born 1964/65), American design professional and information architect
- Nicholas Strausfeld (born 1942), British neuroscientist
- Peter Strausfeld (1910–1980), German–born British artist and illustrator
