= Ian Tomlinson (disambiguation) =

Ian Tomlinson (1962–2009) was an English newspaper vendor who died after being struck by a police officer.

Ian Tomlinson may refer to:

- Ian Tomlinson (athlete), Australian athlete
- Ian Tomlinson (scientist), director of the Institute of Cancer and Genomic Sciences at the University of Birmingham
