= John Sealy =

John Sealy may refer to:

- John Sealy Townsend, mathematical physicist who taught at Oxford University
- John Sealy Hospital, a hospital that is a part of the University of Texas Medical Branch complex in Galveston, Texas, United States
- USS John Sealy (SP-568), a United States Navy minesweeper in commission during 1917

== See also ==
- John Sealey (born 1945), English professional footballer
- John Seally (1741 or 1742–1795), English writer and clergyman
