= Tollet (disambiguation) =

Tollet may refer to:

== Places ==
- Tollet, municipality in the district of Grieskirchen in the Austrian state of Upper Austria

== People ==
- André Tollet (1913–2001), French upholsterer, trade unionist and communist
- Claude Tollet (born 1949), French professional road bicycle racer
- Elizabeth Tollet (1694–1754), British poet
- George Tollet (died 1719), British mathematician and naval administrator
