= Frank Read =

British physicist

Frank Henry Read
- Born: 6 October 1934 (age 91)
- Education: University of London (BSc); University of Manchester (PhD)
- Awards: FRS (1984); Holweck Prize (2000)
- Scientific career
- Fields: atomic physics
- Workplaces: University of Manchester

Frank Henry Read FRS FInstP (born 6 October 1934) is a British physicist. He is an Emeritus Professor of Physics at the University of Manchester.

== Research ==
Read is known for his experimental studies of electron collisions with atoms and molecules, for associated work in instrument design, and for theoretical work on the interpretation of the experimental results. He made advances in the study of threshold effects in electron collisions, and of post-collision interactions in the near-threshold excitation of resonance states.

His studies of the influence of molecular rotation and vibration on the angular distribution of scattered electrons enabled him to deduce the electronic configurations of short-lived molecular negative ion states. He also used the technique of delayed coincidences between electrons and photons for the precision measurements of lifetimes for atomic and molecular states.

== CPO ==
Professor Frank H. Read's software venture, CPO, was established to compute electron trajectories using a tailored boundary‑element method (BEM) for charged‑particle optics.

Read founded Manchester University's Electron Scattering Group in 1961, drawing on his PhD in experimental nuclear physics. He redirected his expertise to atomic and electron optics, applying computational techniques to aperture lenses where traditional finite‑element methods failed—especially near sharp edges. In response, he developed a surface‑charge approach, later formally identified as a form of BEM, which significantly improved accuracy in modelling electrostatic lens systems (#2 cited > 500×).

Under Read's leadership, the group expanded into charged‑particle optics, producing about 70 peer‑reviewed publications, including a flagship paper with over 500 citations, delivering numerous invited lectures and securing multiple patents.

Commercialisation began in 1993 when Read partnered with Nicholas J. Bowring to develop user interfaces. This collaboration grew into CPO Ltd in 2000. The resulting CPO programs (CPO‑2D and CPO‑3D) implemented the BEM in both two‑ and three‑dimensional simulations. Benchmark studies demonstrated that CPO delivers two orders of magnitude greater accuracy or speed for comparable accuracy compared to traditional methods. The software is widely regarded as the gold standard in low‑energy charged‑particle optics

== Books ==
- Electrostatic lenses (1976)
- Electromagnetic radiation (1980)

== Awards and honours ==
Read was elected a Fellow of the Royal Society (FRS) in 1984. In 2000, he was awarded the Holweck Prize for his work on atomic and molecular physics.

Academic offices
Preceded by	Langworthy Professor at the University of Manchester; 1998–2001	Succeeded by Andrew Lyne
