= William Tempest (barrister) =

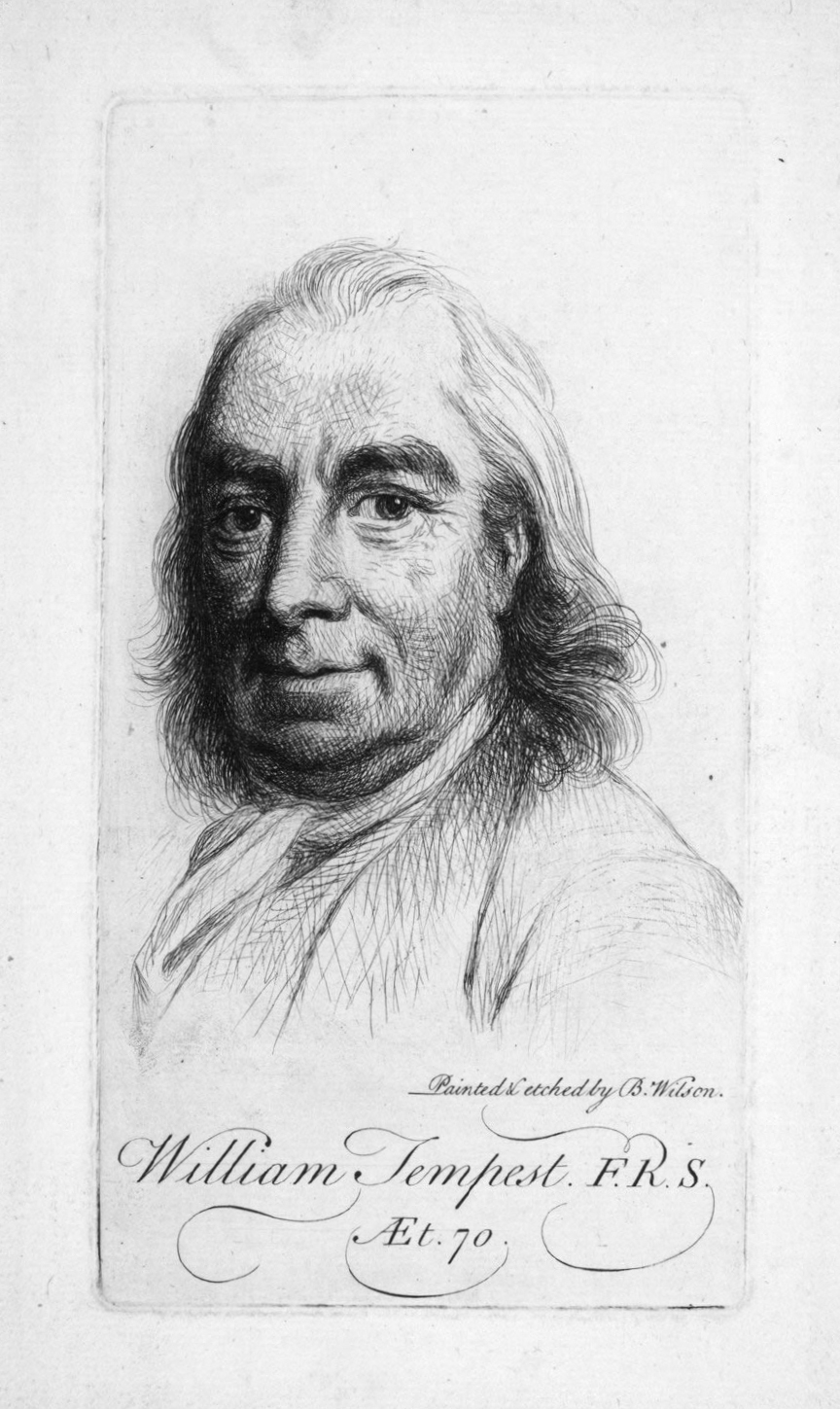
William Tempest at age 70

William Tempest (1682–1761) was an English barrister and Fellow of the Royal Society.

== Life ==
Born on April 16, 1682, he was the son of William Tempest, Prothonotary of the Court of Common Pleas, and his wife Elizabeth Cooke. He was educated at Eton College and matriculated at King's College, Cambridge in 1700. He, in turn, became Prothonotary of the Court of Common Pleas.

Tempest was elected to the Royal Society in 1712. There he was in a small group of Fellows regarded, in 1718, as an expert in "husbandry, gardening and planting" (with Robert Balle, Richard Bradley, John Mortimer and Hans Sloane).

Tempest resided at Shepherds, Cranbrook, Kent. He died on August 15, 1761.

== Family ==
In 1707, Tempest married Elizabeth Hyland, daughter of Samuel Hyland of Bodiam, Sussex.
