= Robert William Stewart =

Los Angeles police officer (1850–1931)

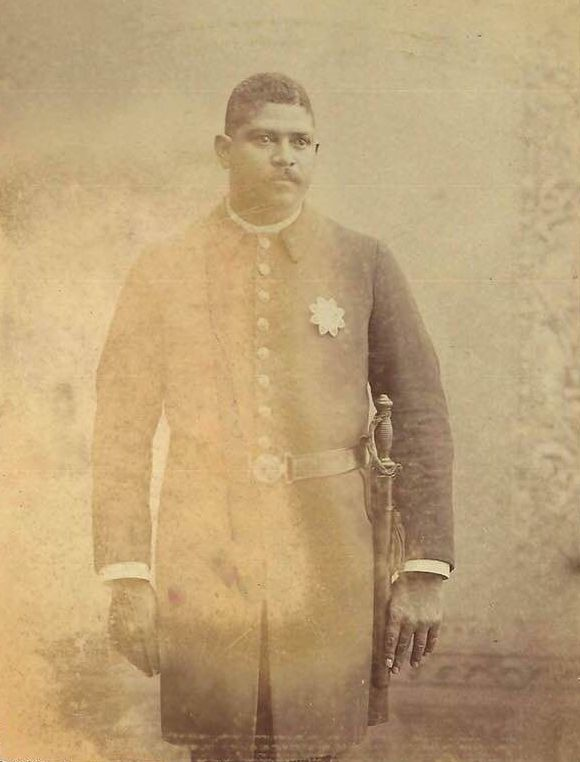
- Born: March 1, 1850; Garrard County, Kentucky, U.S.
- Died: July 27, 1931 (aged 81); Los Angeles, California, U.S.

Robert William Stewart (March 1, 1850 – July 27, 1931) was an American police officer. Appointed in 1886, Stewart was the first Black officer on the Los Angeles Police force.

== Biography ==
Stewart was born March 1, 1850, into a Garrard County, Kentucky, slave family. He gained his freedom after the American Civil War.

Stewart moved west to California, where he joined the LA Police force in 1889. He worked at the LAPD until May, 1900, when he was accused by a white teenager of sexual assault, and arrested. While he was awaiting trial, the police commission voted to fire him. A trial jury later heard the sexual assault charges, and acquitted him.

After he left the police force, he worked as a janitor and laborer in Los Angeles. He died from prostate cancer in Los Angeles on July 27, 1931.

In 2021, 90 years after Stewart's death, the Los Angeles Police Commission voted to posthumously reinstate him. In a statement, the commission said that Stewart had been "unjustly fired".
