= Paraskevas Sphicas =

Paris Sphicas FRS
- Born: Paraskevas Andreas Sphicas; Greek: Παρασκευάς Σφήκας; July 13, 1963 (age 63)
- Education: Massachusetts Institute of Technology (BS, PhD)
- Scientific career
- Fields: Particle physics
- Workplaces: CERN; National and Kapodistrian University of Athens
- Thesis: Search for a high-mass resonance decaying to jets in proton-antiproton collisions (1988)
- Doctoral advisor: Jean Pierre Revol
- Website: www.iasa.gr/people/sphicas

Paraskevas Andreas Sphicas FRS (Greek: Παρασκευάς Σφήκας) is a particle physicist who focuses on studies of High energy collisions in the Large Hadron Collider through which he explores supersymmetry and the mechanism of spontaneous symmetry breaking. He is a senior scientist at CERN and professor of physics at the National and Kapodistrian University of Athens. He was elected a Fellow of the Royal Society (FRS) in 2019.

== Education ==
Sphicas received his Bachelor of Science and PhD degrees in physics from the Massachusetts Institute of Technology in 1984 and 1988 respectively. Sphicas worked on his PhD thesis at the UA1 experiment in CERN, looking for new resonances that decay into jets and studying the production of multiple particle jets.

== Career and research ==
After obtaining his doctorate, he continued at CERN, researching top and bottom quarks. He moved back to the US in 1990 when appointed a Wilson Fellow by Fermilab. He worked on the Tevatron at the Collider Detector at Fermilab (CDF). In 1991, he joined the Massachusetts Institute of Technology (MIT), becoming associate professor in 1994 and then Professor in 1997.

Sphicas continued work on the CDF through the 1990s as part of MIT's team in the CDF experiments. The MIT Team was responsible for three Collider components: the forward calorimeter, the Data Acquisition System and the Third Level Trigger. The 18 MIT scientists, by then led by Sphicas, were part of the team that produced the first evidence for the Top quark in 1994.

Sphicas began participating in the Compact Muon Solenoid (CMS) experiment at CERN in 1994. His early contributions included the development of the Data Acquisition System and the High Level Trigger for CMS, and also the setting up of the Physics Reconstruction and Selection division. In 2002, he moved from MIT to CERN to focus on the CMS. He was also appointed as Professor of Physics at the National and Kapodistrian University of Athens in 2002. He worked in several supervisory roles in the CMS experiment, as it progressed towards the discovery of the Higgs boson in 2012. He co-chaired the publication committee of the experiment in 2012-13 and was then appointed deputy spokesperson for the experiment for three years beginning in 2014.

Sphicas is currently working on the upgrade of the level-1 trigger system of the CMS, preparing for the High Luminosity phase of the Large Hadron Collider at CERN, set to complete by 2026. He has also been serving as the chair of European Committee for Future Accelerators since January 2024.
