= Robert Malcolm Simmons =

Fellow of the Royal Society

- Born: 23 January 1938 (age 88)
- Education: University College London (MSc, 1967); Royal Institution (PhD, 1965); King's College London (BSc, 1960)
- Scientific career
- Fields: Biophysics
- Workplaces: King's College London (1983-2001); Medical Research Council (1979-1983); University College London (1970-1979)

Robert Malcolm Simmons FRS (born 23 January 1938) is a British biophysicist who was Director of the Medical Research Council Muscle and Cell Motility Unit from 1991 to 2003 and the Randall Division of Cell and Molecular Biophysics at King's College London from 1995 to 2001.

== Education ==
Simmons graduated with an upper-second class honours degree in physics from King's College London in 1960, and was further educated at the Royal Institution (PhD, 1965) and University College London, where he received an MSc in physiology in 1967).

== Career ==
After three years as a Sharpey Scholar in the UCL department of physiology, he became a lecturer there in 1970, remaining until he left to become resident fellow at the Medical Research Council from 1979 to 1981. He joined Biophysics Unit at King's College London in 1981, becoming its associate director in 1983, along with the head of biophysics and Professor of Biophysics. While retaining his other titles, he moved from head of biophysics to head of biomolecular sciences in 1988. In 1991, he left both roles to become honorary director of the MRC Muscle and Cell Motility Unit, where he remained until 2001. He was also director of the Randall Centre from 1995 to 2001.

He was elected a Fellow of the Royal Society in 1995.
