= Nicholas Strausfeld =

Nicholas James Strausfeld FRS (born 1942) is regents professor at the Department of Neuroscience at the University of Arizona, Tucson and director, Center for Insect Science, University of Arizona.

He received a B.Sc. and Ph.D. at University College, London.

== Awards ==
- 1994 Guggenheim Fellow
- 1995 MacArthur Fellows Program
- 2002 Fellow of the Royal Society

== Works ==
- "Arthropod Brains: Evolution, Functional Elegance, and Historical Significance" Nicholas James Strausfeld, Harvard University Press, 2012, ISBN 978-0-67404-633-7
- "Dimorphic Olfactory Lobes in the Arthropoda", International Symposium on Olfaction and Taste, Editor Thomas E. Finger, John Wiley and Sons, 2009, ISBN 978-1-57331-738-2
- "Pathways in Dipteran Insects for Early Visual Motion Processing", Motion vision: computational, neural, and ecological constraints, Editors Johannes M. Zanker, Jochen Zeil, Springer, 2001, ISBN 978-3-540-65166-6
- "Oculomotor Control in Insects", Neurons, Networks, and Motor Behavior, Editors Paul S. G. Stein, Sten Grillner, Douglas G. Stuart, Allen I. Selverston, MIT Press, 1999, ISBN 978-0-262-69227-4
