= Ussing chamber =

Apparatus for measuring cell membrane properties

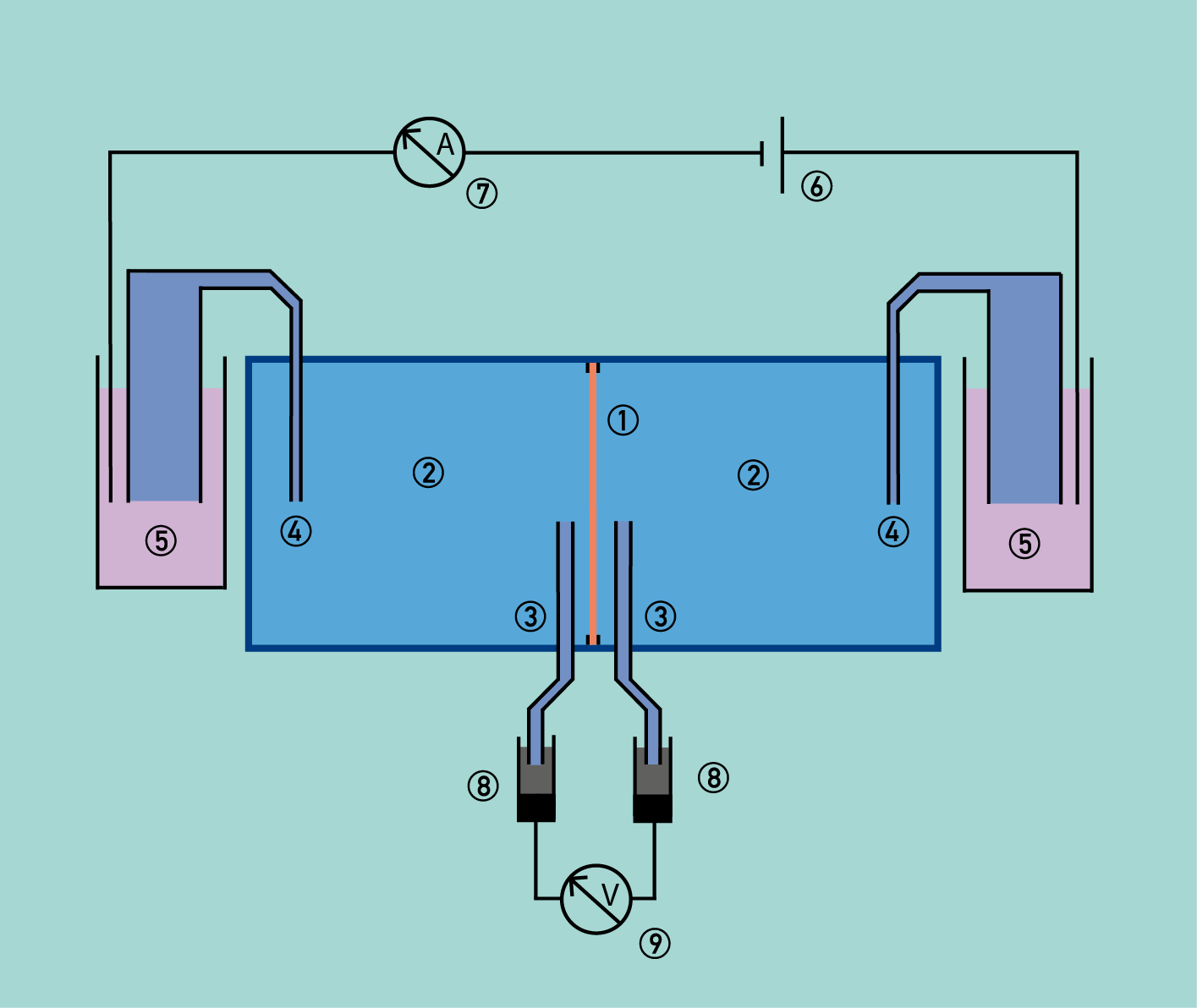
The basic principle of the Ussing chamber : (1) epithelial tissue (2) the two half chambers with Ringer solution (3)(4) Agar-Ringer bridges (5) saturated KCl-AgCl solution (6) variable DC source (7) amperemeter (8) saturated KCl-Kalomel electrode (9) voltmeter

The basis of membrane potential

An Ussing chamber is an apparatus for measuring epithelial membrane properties. It can detect and quantify transport and barrier functions of living tissue. The Ussing chamber was invented by the Danish zoologist and physiologist Hans Henriksen Ussing in 1946.

The technique is used to measure the short-circuit current as an indicator of net ion transport taking place across an epithelium. Ussing chambers are used to measure ion transport in native tissue, such as gut mucosa, and in a monolayer of cells grown on permeable supports.

== Function ==
The Ussing chamber provides a system to measure the transport of ions, nutrients, and drugs across various epithelial tissues, (although can generate false-negative results for lipophilic substances). It consists of two halves separated by the epithelia (sheet of mucosa or monolayer of epithelial cells grown on permeable supports). Epithelia are polar in nature, i.e., they have an apical or mucosal side and a basolateral or serosal side. An Ussing chamber can isolate the apical side from the basolateral side. The two half chambers are filled with equal amounts of symmetrical Ringer solution to remove chemical, mechanical or electrical driving forces. Ion transport takes place across any epithelium. Transport may be in either direction. Ion transport produces a potential difference (voltage difference) across the epithelium. The voltage is measured using two voltage electrodes placed near the tissue/epithelium. This voltage is cancelled out by injecting current, using two other current electrodes placed away from the epithelium. This short-circuit current (Isc) is the measure of net ion transport.

Measuring epithelial ion transport is helped by Ussing chambers. The voltage result from this ion transport is easy to accurately measure. The epithelium pumps ions from one side to the other and the ions leak back through so-called tight junctions that are situated between the epithelial cells. To measure ion transport, an external current is applied. Simply cancelling the voltage underestimates the true value. This is corrected by a short circuit at the voltage measuring electrodes. The resistance between the external voltage electrodes must be considered. The Isc underestimates the ion transport: the error can be as much as 10-fold. The type of chambers suggested by Ussing produces large errors. This error is often estimated by measuring the voltage without tissue present, leading to uncertain values. Better methods involve using alternating current in the form of sinuous-shaped current using several frequencies, square wave pulses, sharp impulses and random noise.

== Types ==
The main types of Ussing chamber systems are:

- The Classic chamber system (as designed by Ussing).
- The Self-contained chamber system (the full apparatus within a single block)
- The Multi-channel chamber system (2 to 24 independent chambers combined)
