= Michelangelo Tilli =

Italian botanist (1655–1740)

Doctor of Medicine Michelangelo Tilli FRS
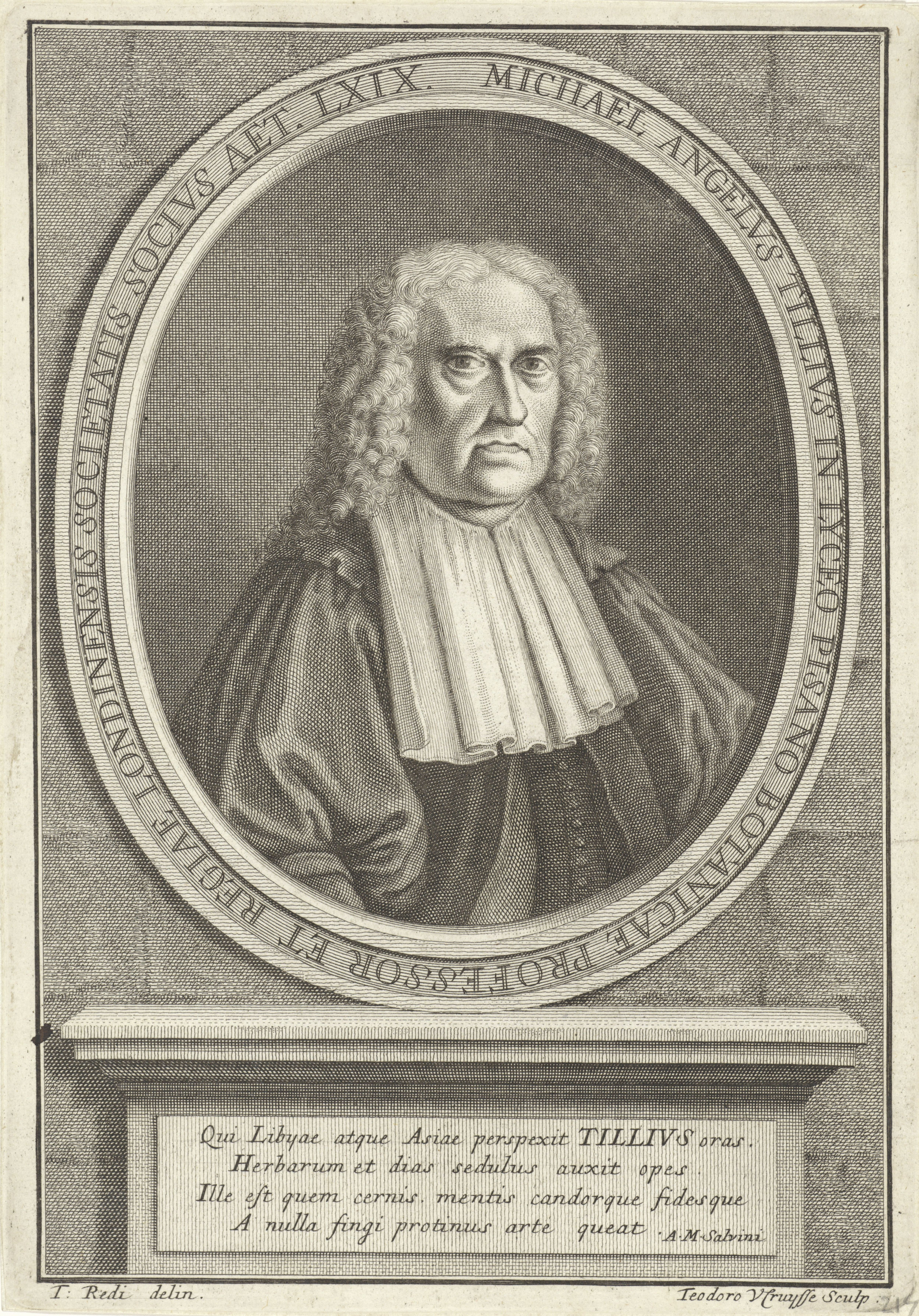
- Michelangelo Tilli (1714)
- Born: August 8, 1655; Castelfiorentino, Grand Duchy of Tuscany
- Died: 13 March 1740 (aged 84); Pisa, Grand Duchy of Tuscany
- Resting place: Chiesa di San Francesco, Castelfiorentino
- Education: University of Pisa
- Known for: Catalogus Plantarum Horti Pisani
- Parent(s): Desiderio di Giovanni Tilli; Lucrezia Salvadori
- Scientific career
- Fields: Medicine and botany
- Workplaces: University of Pisa; Orto botanico di Pisa
- Academic advisors: Lorenzo Bellini

Michelangelo Tilli or Michele Angelo Tilli FRS (8 August 1655 – 13 March 1740) was an Italian physician and botanist, noted for his publication of Catalogus Plantarum Horti Pisani (Florence 1723).

== Biography ==
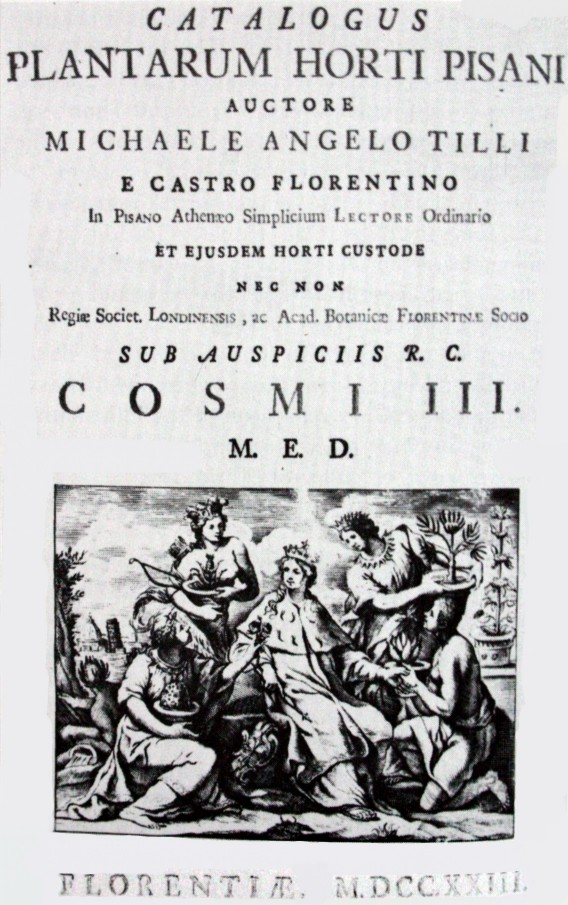
Catalogus Plantarum Horti Pisani

Michelangelo was born in Castelfiorentino, the son of Desiderio Tilli and Lucrezia Salvadori. In 1677 he graduated in medicine and surgery at the University of Pisa and in 1681 was appointed as naval surgeon by Cosimo III. He embarked on a Tuscan galley for the Balearic Islands and went to Constantinople in 1683 with the florentine surgeon Pier Francesco Pasquali to tend to Musaipp Pasha Mustafa II, the son of the sultan Mehmed IV, after a serious fall from his horse. From there they spent some time in Albania and Adrianople, and Tilli went on to Tunis, to study the remains of Carthage and to collect botanical specimens.

He became professor of botany at Pisa in 1685 and also director of the Botanical Garden of Pisa, introducing plants from Asia and Africa. He was among the first in Italy to use greenhouses for plants, making it possible to cultivate pineapples and coffee in Italy. Carl Linnaeus praised Pisa's botanical garden as one of the finest in Europe. Cosimo III was an enthusiastic supporter of the garden, arranging for the importation of plants from as far afield as the Americas.

He became a member of the Royal Society in 1708.

== Bibliography ==
- Giovanni Lami, Commemorazione, in Novelle letterarie, 20 maggio 1740, n. 21, col. 325-330;
- Carl Linnaeus (1751). Philosophia botanica. Stockholm. pp. 2–17.
- Fabroni, Angelo (1775). Vitarum italorum doctrina excellentium qui saeculo XVIII floruerunt. Vol. V. Rome. pp. 355–380.
- Calvi, Giovanni (1777). Commentarium inserviturum historiae pisani vireti botanici academici. Pisa. pp. 157–172.
- Fabroni, Angelo (1791). Historia Academiae pisanae. Vol. III. Pisa. pp. 236–239.
- Niccoli, Vittorio (1893). "Michelangelo Tilli". Miscellanea Storica della Valdelsa. I: 12–24.
- Nomi Pesciolini, Ugo (1911). "Per la biografia di uno scienziato e viaggiatore valdelsano. Michelangelo Tilli". Miscellanea Storica della Valdelsa. XIX: 1–21.
- Neviani, Antonio (1940). "Una lettera del conte Luigi Ferdinando Marsili al professor Michelangelo Tilli". Rivista di storia di scienze mediche e naturali. XXXI: 83–87.
- Cochrane, Eric W. (1961). Tradition and enlightenment in the Tuscan academies, 1690-1800. Rome. pp. 130–132.
- Boas Hall, Marie (1984). "La scienza italiana vista dalla Royal Society". Scienza e Letteratura Nella Cultura Italiana del Settecento. Bologna: 52–60.
- Tongiorgi Tomasi, Lucia; Garbari, Fabio; Tosi, Alessandro (1991). Giardino dei semplici: l'orto botanico di Pisa dal XVI al XX secolo. Pisa. pp. 65–67, 69 f.
- Arrigoni, Tiziano (1992). "Lo studio della botanica nella Toscana del Settecento". Museologia Scientifica. IX: 386, 388, 394.
