= Maurice Skolnick =

British physicist and condensed matter researcher

- Education: University of Oxford (PhD, 1975)
- Known for: Research on quantum dots, polaritons, and photonic structures in semiconductor nanostructures
- Awards: Fellow of the Royal Society
- Scientific career
- Fields: Condensed matter physics Semiconductor physics Nanostructures
- Workplaces: University of Sheffield; Royal Signals and Radar Establishment, Malvern; Max Planck Institute, Grenoble

Maurice Sidney Skolnick is a British physicist and Emeritus Professor of Experimental Condensed Matter Physics at the University of Sheffield. His research concerns the optoelectronic properties of semiconductor materials and nanostructures, including quantum dots, semiconductor microcavities and photonic crystals.

He was elected a Fellow of the Royal Society in 2009 and a foreign member of the Russian Academy of Sciences in 2011.

== Education ==
In 1972, Skolnick obtained a BSc with first-class honours at the University of Oxford. In 1975, he completed a PhD. His doctoral thesis, supervised by R. A. Stradling, was titled Infrared Studies of Semiconductors.

== Career ==
Skolnick spent two years as a postdoctoral researcher at the Max Planck Institute for Solid State Research. In 1978, he moved to the Royal Signals and Radar Establishment (RSRE) in Malvern, where he worked for thirteen years. In 1984, he was also a visiting scientist at Bell Laboratories.

In January 1991, Skolnick was appointed Professor of Condensed Matter Physics at the University of Sheffield, a position he held until his retirement. He became Emeritus Professor in September 2025. At Sheffield, he headed the university's semiconductor physics research group. He has also served as Research Director, and previously as deputy and co-director, of the EPSRC National Centre for III–V Technologies at Sheffield, later renamed the National Epitaxy Facility.

Skolnick was chair of the Semiconductor Commission and a vice-president of the International Union of Pure and Applied Physics from 2002 to 2005. He held an EPSRC Senior Research Fellowship from 2001 to 2006 and received a five-year European Research Council Advanced Investigator Grant in 2012.

== Research ==
Skolnick used cyclotron resonance techniques to study the band structure of III–V semiconductors, including the valence band of gallium arsenide. In the late 1970s, while working at the Max Planck Institute with D. Bimberg, he contributed to experimental studies of electron–hole liquids in compound semiconductors.

He contributed to work on magnetic-field-induced indirect gaps in semiconductor systems with D. M. Whittaker. He also contributed to research on many-body effects, including the Fermi edge singularity and Fermi-sea shake-up in modulation-doped quantum wells, and reported an early observation of population inversion in semiconductor quantum wells using resonant-tunnelling techniques with J. W. Cockburn.

From 1995 onwards, Skolnick worked on the physics of exciton-polaritons in semiconductor microcavities, including electric-field and temperature tuning of exciton-photon coupling. His Sheffield group, in collaboration with J. J. Baumberg, reported continuous-wave stimulated scattering in semiconductor microcavities in 2000.

His research group also contributed to studies of Bose–Einstein condensation and superfluid behaviour in polariton systems.

He studied quantum-dot energy levels, carrier relaxation mechanisms and the alignment of electron and hole wavefunctions within quantum dots.

He worked on phonon-assisted population inversion of single quantum dots using pulsed laser excitation, a mechanism used to demonstrate on-demand single-photon emission.

His group has also developed quantum-dot-based single-photon sources embedded in photonic-crystal cavities and waveguides, including sources operating at telecommunications wavelengths.

== AegiQ ==
In December 2019, Skolnick was one of four co-founders of AegiQ, a quantum photonics spin-out company from the University of Sheffield, alongside Maksym Sich, Scott Dufferwiel and Jon Heffernan. The company develops single-photon sources and photonic quantum-computing hardware based on research originating at the University of Sheffield.

== Awards and honours ==
- Mott Medal and Prize of the Institute of Physics (2002), for contributions to the understanding of excitons, defects and interactions in semiconductors.
- Elected Fellow of the Royal Society (2009).
- Foreign Member of the Russian Academy of Sciences (2011).
- Optics and Photonics Prize of the Institute of Physics (2018), for work on coupled light-matter systems and quantum optical circuits based on semiconductor quantum dots.
