= Michael James Stowell =

British materials and metallurgy scientist (c.1935–2022)

Michael James Stowell FRS (10 July 1935–27 February 2022) was a British materials and metallurgy scientist known for developing the first commercial superplastic aluminium alloy known as Supral.

Mike Stowell was raised in Newport, and moved to Bristol University for his undergraduate degree in physics. At Bristol, he was drawn to electron microscopy, a technique he would apply to the study of thin films, and to his other metallurgy research fields including the aforementioned superplastic aluminium alloys. This research had industrial applications, which he explored during his time with the Tube Investments Group Research Laboratory, in Essex, where he was active from the 1960s until its closure in 1988. He would remain in industry at the Aluminium Company of Canada (Alcan) for the remainder of his career.

The development of Supral and the establishment of the company Superform Metals, led Mike to being awarded the Queen's Award for Industry in 1981. He was a fellow of the Institute of Physics, the Institution of Metallurgists, and the Royal Society.
