= Ian Tomlinson (scientist) =

British scientist

Ian Tomlinson FRS FMedSci
- Born: Ian Tomlinson
- Awards: EMBO Membership (2016)
- Scientific career
- Fields: Colorectal cancer Genetics
- Workplaces: University of Edinburgh

Ian Tomlinson is a British scientist who is a director of the Institute of Cancer and Genomic Sciences at the University of Birmingham.

== Career and research ==
Highlights of Tomlinson's research include the discovery of colorectal cancer genes and kidney cancer predisposition genes that are transferred by Mendelian inheritance.

=== Awards and honours ===
Tomlinson was elected a Fellow of the Royal Society in 2019 for "substantial contributions to the improvement of natural knowledge". He is also elected a Fellow of the Academy of Medical Sciences (FMedSci) in 2009. In 2013, he was awarded the United European Gastroenterology Research Prize of €100.
