= John Seally =

John Seally (1741 or 1742–1795) was an English writer, in later life a clergyman.

== Life ==
Born in Somerset, he was educated at Bristol grammar school, with a view to ordination. His uncle and potential patron died, and he entered a solicitor's office; but moved on to learn business under the merchant Malachy Postlethwayt. Supported by his mother, he then became a journalist.

During a visit to Manchester, Seally persuaded an heiress to elope with him but her father caught up with them at Worcester. He worked as a writing-master and accountant. Around 1767 he established a school in Bridgwater Square, Westminster, and after some years took holy orders. During a stay in Rome in 1774 he obtained admission to the Accademia degli Arcadi by a eulogy on Maria Maddelana Fernandez Corilla, poet-laureate of Italy. In 1790 he was presented to the vicarage of East Meon with Froxfield and Steep.

Seally was elected fellow of the Royal Society on 30 June 1791, and was also M.A. and LL.D. He died in Queen Square, Westminster, in March 1795. A correspondent in the Evangelical Magazine mentioned that Seally had been chaplain to the Earl of Kintore, was buried in Ellisfield, Hampshire, and was aged 49 on his death.

== Works ==
Seally published novels, poems, and school books, including:

- The Loves of Calisto and Emira, or the Fatal Legacy, London, 1776; a French translation was published in Paris (1778).
- Moral Tales after the Eastern manner, London (1780?).
- The Marriage of Sir Gawaine, an opera, 1782.
- A complete Geographical Dictionary, 2 vols., London, 1787. The astronomical section was provided by Israel Lyons.
- The Lady's Encyclopaedia, 3 vols., London, 1788.

He contributed occasional verses to magazines, and launched a short-lived political paper signed Britannicus. He ran for some time the Universal Museum and the Freeholder's Magazine, and was involved in the St. James's Magazine, edited by Robert Lloyd.

== Family ==
Seally married (as he thought) in 1766, a reputedly rich widow of twice his age, but found, some years later, that she had no money and had a husband, the Rev. William Lewis. After separation from Mrs. Lewis he married Mary, eldest daughter of Joseph Humphreys, rector of Ellisfield, Hampshire, and of North Stoke, Somerset, who survived him.

== Notes ==
Attribution

This article incorporates text from a publication now in the public domain: Lee, Sidney, ed. (1897). "Seally, John". Dictionary of National Biography. Vol. 51. London: Smith, Elder & Co.
