= George Tollet =

George Tollet (died 1719) was a mathematician and naval administrator.

He was born in Dublin, the son of Thomas Tollet of London and educated at Westminster School and Trinity College, Cambridge.

In 1685 he was also a founder member and treasurer of the Dublin Philosophical Society, where he presented many papers and experiments, concentrating on applied mathematics.

Tollet held various government posts, mainly in Ireland, before being appointed Extra Commissioner of the Navy in 1702, a sinecure post which however offered an opportunity to move into the Tower of London until 1714. He was also Second Master at Westminster School from 1711 to 1714. He became acquainted with many members of the Royal Society, including Isaac Newton and Edmond Halley as well as literary figures such as Samuel Pepys and John Evelyn. He was elected a Fellow of the Royal Society in June 1713.

Tollet was interested in education; in 1685 William Molyneux, a member of the Dublin society wrote to Halley in London mentioning an eleven-year-old girl that he had trained in arithmetic, algebra, geometry and trigonometry. He also ensured the education of his own daughter.

In 1718 he purchased a country home at Betley Hall, Staffordshire for his retirement but died there in 1719. Their son George inherited Betley Hall, their daughter was the poet Elizabeth Tollet (1694-1754).
