= Ian Shanks =

British scientist

Ian Shanks OBE FRS FRSE FREng FRSA

Head of Engineering Sciences, Unilever
- In office 2001–2003

Divisional Scientific Adviser, Research Division, Unilever
- In office 1994–2000

Chief Scientist, Thorn EMI
- In office 1986–1994

Personal details
- Born: Ian Alexander Shanks; 22 June 1948 (age 77)

Ian Alexander Shanks (born 22 June 1948) is a British scientist who invented the technology behind the digital blood glucose meter in 1982, working on his own time while employed at Unilever. In the 1970s Shanks had done significant research on liquid crystal displays (LCDs), and later optoelectronics.

== Early life ==
Shanks attended Dumbarton Academy and then gained a BSc from the University of Glasgow. He obtained a PhD.

== Career ==
=== Glucose meter ===
In May 1982 Shanks moved to Unilever UK Central Resources Ltd (CRL) north of Bedford. There, whilst working in process control, he invented the technology that led to the digital blood glucose meter, under European Patent (UK) 0 170 375 filed in June 1985 and granted in May 1990 (U.S. patent 5141868A). The technology involves a capillary cell incorporating electrodes coated with glucose oxidase, in meters used by millions of diabetics, thereby revolutionising blood glucose testing. Most of the companies making the meters obtained licences from Unilever medical diagnostics subsidiary Unipath, until it was sold to Inverness Medical Inventions in 2001.

In 1984 Shanks became the youngest person, at 35, to receive an FRS, based on his LCD development work. He also won the Clifford Paterson Medal and Prize in 1994.

Shanks became Head of Physical and Engineering Sciences at CRL before leaving in October 1986.

Shanks sued Unilever in 2006 for employee-inventor patent compensation under section 40 of the 1977 Patents Act — initially unsuccessfully. However, in a landmark decision on 23 October 2019, the Supreme Court awarded him £2 million on the basis that Unilever had received an “outstanding benefit” from the glucose testing patents.

Shanks founded the Optoelectronics College.

In 2025 The National Academy of Engineering (NAE) awarded Shanks with the national Russ Prize for breakthrough achievements in engineering and technology “for the invention of the electrochemical capillary fill device (eCFD), which gives diabetes patients and caregivers accurate and timely blood glucose measurements for diabetes management.”

== Personal life ==
He was awarded the OBE in the 2012 Birthday Honours. He lives in Broughty Ferry.
