= Thomas Stack =

English physician and translator

Thomas Stack (died 1756) was an English physician and translator. He was elected as a Fellow of the Royal Society in 1751, where he had been foreign secretary from 1748.

He translated the Medica Sacra of Richard Mead from Latin (1755).
