= Hans Ussing =

Danish biologist (1911–2000)

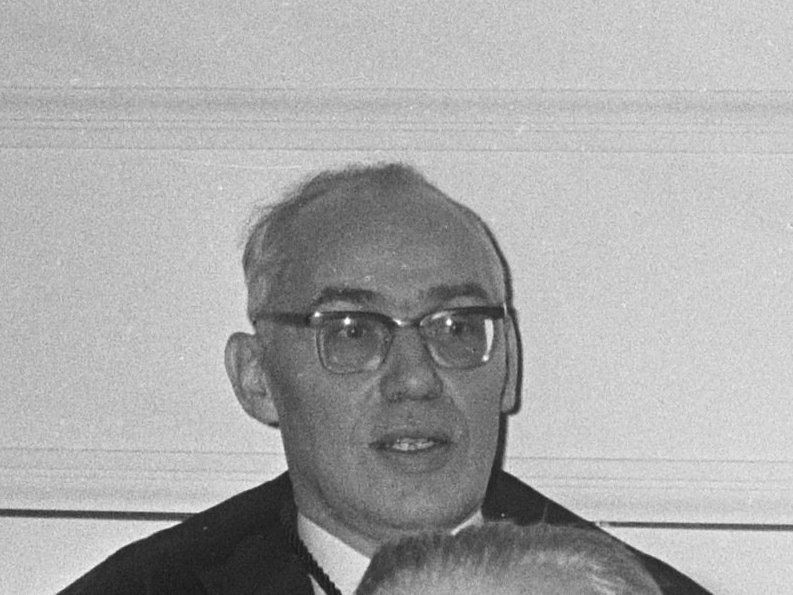
Hans Ussing (Leuven, 1967)

Hans Henriksen Ussing (30 December 1911 – 22 December 2000) was a Danish scientist, best known for having invented the Ussing chamber.

In the early 1950s Ussing was the first to describe the mechanism by which ions are actively transported across frog skin.

He studied biology and geography at the University of Copenhagen. In 1943 he received his master's degree (with honors).

In 1970 he was awarded the Amory Prize of the American Academy of Arts and Sciences.
