= Armourers and Brasiers' Company Prize =

The Royal Society Armourers and Brasiers' Company Prize
- Sponsored by: Royal Society; Worshipful Company of Armourers and Brasiers
- Location: London
- Website: royalsociety.org/grants-schemes-awards/awards/armourers-brasiers-prize/

The Royal Society Armourers and Brasiers' Company Prize is sponsored by the Worshipful Company of Armourers and Brasiers and awarded biennially by the Royal Society "for excellence in materials science and technology" and is accompanied by a £2000 gift. The medal was first awarded in 1985 to Michael F. Ashby "in recognition of his outstanding contributions to materials science, first for identifying the mechanism underlying and by modelling theoretically a number of phenomena of great importance to the materials engineer".

== Laureates ==
Laureates of the award include:

Year	Name	Rationale	Notes
1986	Michael F. Ashby	"in recognition of his outstanding contributions to materials science, first for identifying the mechanism underlying and by modelling theoretically a number of phenomena of great importance to the materials engineer, and second for pioneering the important concepts of deformation and fracture maps which display in a single field the area of dominance of specific flow and fracture mechanisms."	—
1988	Kenneth H. Jack	"in recognition of his outstanding work on ceramics, in particular that on sialons and their subsequent applications"	—
1991	William Bonfield	"in recognition of his pioneering and innovative work in biomaterials, in particular in developing the concept of a hydroxyapatite reinforced polymer composite'"	—
1993	Jan Edgar Evetts	"in recognition of his many significant contributions to the study and application of superconducting materials, amorphous magnetic alloys and multi-layered materials"	—
1993	James Derek Birchall	"in recognition of his outstanding work on inorganic materials including the development of strong ceramic fibres and high strength macro-defect-free cement."	—
1995	Michael James Goulette	"n recognition of his outstanding work in the field of gas turbine materials and the development of new super alloys and advanced composites such as titanium matrix composites and ceramic matrix composites"	—
1997	Harry Bhadeshia	"in recognition of his outstanding work in the field of solid state phase transformation in steels, in particular for his research into the bainite transformations and for his invention of a carbide-free bainitic steel with enhanced wear and fracture resistance."	—
1999	David Pettifor	"in recognition of his outstanding work in the development of phenomenological structure maps for binary and pseudo-binary alloys known as the 'Pettifor Maps', and his vision and leadership in establishing the Materials Modelling Laboratory at Oxford with its strong links to industry and recognised as an international flagship laboratory for modelling"	—
2001	John Hunt	"in recognition of his outstanding and wide-ranging and definitive theoretical and experimental research on solidification of materials, and for his contributions to industrial casting processes."	—
2003	Derek Fray	"in recognition of his outstanding contribution to work in the fields of extractive metallurgy and materials chemistry, in particular for his leading role in the development of the FCC process for the reduction of titanium and other metals from their oxides, and for his promotion of links with industry and other organisations interested in its exploitation"	—
2005	John Kilner	"in recognition of his work in Solid Oxide Fuel Cells (SOFCs). His fundamental work has been focused on the control of oxygen transportation in ceramic materials, and most recently in applying this in his development of solid oxide fuel cells"	—
2007	Alan Windle	"in recognition of his work in the areas of liquid crystalline polymers, computational modelling, and carbon nanotubes"	-
2009	Anthony Kinloch	"in recognition of his outstanding work in adhesion science and technology"	—
2010	Philip J. Withers	"in recognition of his pioneering use of neutron and hard x-ray beams to map stresses and image defects in industrial scale components and devices."	
2012	Jenny Nelson	"for her theoretical insight into the many factors affecting the fabrication and performance of organic photovoltaics, which has led to the rational design of these devices and related photodetectors based on organic semiconductors."	-
2014	Ivan Parkin	"in recognition of his insight, synthesis, development and commercialisation of coatings. In particular inorganic-oxide self-cleaning coatings for windows and anti-microbial coatings to combat hospital acquired infections."	-
2016	Neil Alford	"for his outstanding contributions to materials research with benefit to society, especially the development of ultra-low-loss microwave dielectrics for communications."	
2018	Steven Armes	"for his pioneering development of colloidal nanocomposite particles"	
2020	George D. W. Smith	"for pioneering and leading the development of engineering alloys through the invention and application of the three-dimensional atom probe, making profound contributions to basic understanding and industrial applications."	
2022	Iain McCulloch	"for making fundamental contributions to the application of materials chemistry to organic electronic applications, with an applied, results-oriented focus, always demonstrating translational impact and commercial potential."	
2024	Molly Stevens	"for pioneering nanomaterials for ultrasensitive disease diagnostics and advanced therapeutic delivery, for the benefit of individuals and society at a global level."	
