= Joe Vinen =

British physicist (1930–2022)

Joe Vinen FRS HonFInstP
- Born: William Frank Vinen; 15 February 1930
- Died: 8 June 2022 (aged 92)
- Education: Clare College, Cambridge
- Awards: Simon Memorial Prize (1963); Holweck Prize (1978); Rumford Medal (1980); Guthrie Medal and Prize (2005)
- Scientific career
- Workplaces: University of Cambridge; University of Birmingham
- Thesis: The hydrodynamics of liquid helium II (1957)
- Doctoral advisor: Donald Osborne; David Shoenberg

William Frank Vinen FRS HonFInstP (15 February 1930 – 8 June 2022) was a British physicist specialising in low temperature physics.

== Career ==
Vinen was born on 15 February 1930, the son of Gilbert Vinen and his wife Olive Maud Vinen, née Roach. After Watford Grammar School, he attended Clare College, Cambridge, completing a doctorate (PhD) in 1956. He was a research fellow there from 1955 to 1958, when he became a fellow at Pembroke College, Cambridge. In 1962, he was appointed to a chair of physics at Birmingham University. He was appointed to the Poynting Chair in 1973. He served as head of department from 1973 until 1981, and retired from the university in 1997.

== Awards and honours ==
Vinen was elected a Fellow of the Royal Society (FRS) in 1973. His certificate of election reads:

Distinguished for his contributions to low temperature physics. His experiments with H.E. Hall on attenuation of second sound in rotating liquid helium provided the first demonstration of the probable existence of vortex lines and later in an elegant experiment he gave the first direct proof that the circulation was quantized. His extensive studies of heat currents in liquid helium have led to a thorough understanding of mutual friction between the normal and superfluid components and of critical flow effects. At Birmingham he has continued to make important contributions not only to the liquid helium problem but also to the somewhat analogous one of flux flow and dissipation processes in type II superconductors. All his work is distinguished by an exceptionally profound analytical power in his approach both to experiment and theory.

He was awarded the Rumford Medal in 1980 in "recognition of his discovery of the quantum of circulation in superfluid helium and his development of new techniques for precise measurements within liquid helium."

== Personal life ==
In 1960, Vinen married Susan-Mary Audrey Master; they had one son, Richard, historian of 20th-century France, professor at King's College London, and one daughter, Katie, and lived in Birmingham.
