= Institute of Physics Michael Faraday Medal and Prize =

Award for outstanding contributions to experimental physics

Institute of Physics Michael Faraday Medal & Prize
- Awarded for: Outstanding contributions to experimental physics
- Sponsored by: Institute of Physics
- Country: United Kingdom
- Presented by: Institute of Physics
- Formerly called: Guthrie Medal and Prize
- Rewards: Gold medal, £1000
- First award: 1914
- Website: Official website

The Michael Faraday Medal and Prize is a gold medal awarded annually by the Institute of Physics in experimental physics. The award is made "for outstanding and sustained contributions to experimental physics." The medal is accompanied by a prize of £1000 and a certificate.

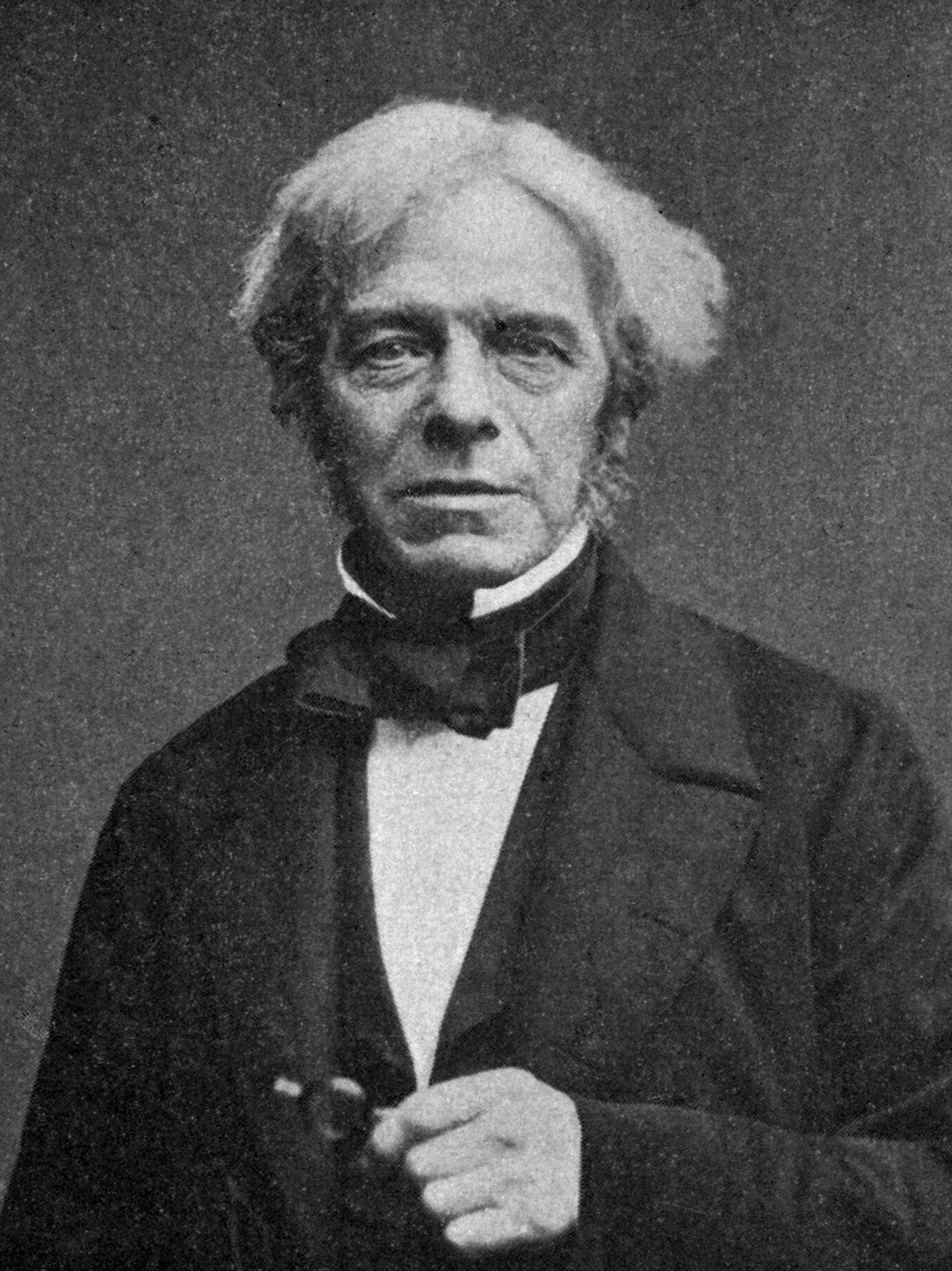
Michael Faraday (1791 - 1867)

== Historical development ==
- 1914-1965 Guthrie Lecture initiated to remember Frederick Guthrie, founder of the Physical Society (which merged with the Institute of Physics in 1960).
- 1966-2007 Guthrie Medal and Prize (in response to changed conditions from when the lecture was first established). From 1992, it became one of the Institute's Premier Awards.
- 2008–present Michael Faraday Medal and Prize

== Medalists and lecturers ==
=== Faraday medalists ===
- 2026 J. C. Séamus Davis, "For the discovery and exploration of macroscopic quantum phenomena and states of matter."
- 2024 Laura Herz, "For pioneering advances in the photophysics of next-generation semiconductors, accomplished through innovative spectroscopic experiments."
- 2023 Neil Alford, Mark Oxborrow, Chris Kay, Jonathan Breeze, Juna Sathian and Enrico Salvadori, "For their discovery of the world's first room-temperature solid-state organic maser and subsequent discovery of room-temperature continuous wave masing in diamond."
- 2022 Nikolay Zheludev, "For international leadership, discoveries and in-depth studies of new phenomena and functionalities in photonic nanostructures and nanostructured matter."
- 2021 Bucker Dangor, "For outstanding contributions to experimental plasma physics, and in particular for his role in the development of the field of laser-plasma acceleration."
- 2020 Richard Ellis, "For over 35 years of pioneering contributions in faint-object astronomy, often with instruments he funded and constructed, which have opened up the early universe to direct observations."
- 2019 Roy Taylor, "For his extensive, internationally leading contributions to the development of spectrally diverse, ultrafast-laser sources and pioneering fundamental studies of nonlinear fibre optics that have translated to scientific and commercial application."
- 2018 Jennifer Thomas, "For her outstanding investigations into the physics of neutrino oscillations, in particular her leadership of the MINOS/MINOS+ long-baseline neutrino oscillation experiment."
- 2017 Jeremy Baumberg, "For his investigations of many ingenious nanostructures supporting novel and precisely engineered plasmonic phenomena relevant to single molecule and atom dynamics, Raman spectroscopies and metamaterials applications."
- 2016 Jenny Nelson," For her pioneering advances in the science of nanostructured and molecular semiconductor materials "
- 2015 Henning Sirringhaus, "For transforming our knowledge of charge transport phenomena in organic semiconductors as well as our ability to exploit them"
- 2014 Alexander Giles Davies and Edmund Linfield, "For their outstanding and sustained contributions to the physics and technology of the far-infrared (terahertz) frequency region of the electromagnetic spectrum"
- 2013 Edward Hinds, "For his innovative and seminal experimental investigations into ultra-cold atoms and molecules"
- 2012 Roy Sambles, "For his pioneering research in experimental condensed matter physics"
- 2011 Alan Andrew Watson, "For his outstanding leadership within the Pierre Auger Observatory, and the insights he has provided to the origin and nature of ultra high energy cosmic rays"
- 2010 Athene Donald, "For her many highly original studies of the structures and behaviour of polymers both synthetic and natural"
- 2009 Donal Bradley, "For his pioneering work in the field of 'plastic electronics'"
- 2008 Roger Cowley, "For pioneering work in the development and application of neutron and X-ray scattering techniques to the physics of a wide range of important solid and liquid-state systems"

=== Guthrie medalists ===
- 2007 Gilbert Lonzarich, "for his experimental and theoretical contributions to condensed matter physics"
- 2006 Marshall Stoneham, "for his wide-ranging theoretical work on defects in solids"
- 2005 William Frank Vinen, "for his outstanding contributions to superfluids and superconductors"
- 2004 Henry Hall
- 2003 Michael Springford
- 2002 Penelope Jane Brown
- 2001 Laurence Eaves
- 2000 Lawrence Michael Brown
- 1999 George Bacon
- 1998 Derek Charles Robinson
- 1997 John Evan Baldwin
- 1996 Edward Roy Pike
- 1995 John Enderby
- 1994 Philip George Burke
- 1993 Tom Kibble
- 1992 Archibald Howie
- 1991 Dennis William Sciama
- 1990 Roger James Elliott
- 1989 Martin J. Rees
- 1988 Alan Lidiard
- 1987 Samuel Frederick Edwards
- 1986 Denys Haigh Wilkinson
- 1985 Michael Pepper
- 1984 Michael John Seaton
- 1983 Jeffrey Goldstone
- 1982 Charles Frank
- 1981 John Clive Ward
- 1980 Michael Ellis Fisher
- 1979 Donald Hill Perkins
- 1978 Philip Warren Anderson
- 1977 Alan Howard Cottrell
- 1976 Abdus Salam
- 1975 David Tabor
- 1974 Rudolf Ludwig Mössbauer
- 1973 Hermann Bondi
- 1972 Brian David Josephson
- 1971 John Ashworth Ratcliffe
- 1970 Alfred Brian Pippard
- 1969 Cecil Frank Powell
- 1968 Rudolf Ernst Peierls
- 1967 James Chadwick
- 1966 William Cochran

=== Guthrie lecturers ===
- 1965 John Bertram Adams
- 1964 Martin Ryle
- 1963 Leslie Fleetwood Bates
- 1962 Alfred Charles Bernard Lovell
- 1961 David Shoenberg
- 1960 Fred Hoyle
- 1959 Harrie Stewart Wilson Massey
- 1958 Willis Eugene Lamb
- 1957 Harold C Urey
- 1956 Francis Simon
- 1955 Edmund Clifton Stoner
- 1954 Geoffrey Taylor
- 1953 Max Born
- 1952 W Lawrence Bragg
- 1951 Nevill Francis Mott
- 1950 George Ingle Finch
- 1949 Alexander Oliver Rankine
- 1948 George Paget Thomson
- 1947 John Desmond Bernal
- 1946 Max Jakob
- 1945 Arturo Duperier: "The Geophysical Aspect of Cosmic Rays"
- 1944 Joel H Hildebrand
- 1943 Edward T. Whittaker: "Chance, freewill and necessity, in the scientific conception of the universe"
- 1942 Edward V Appleton
- 1941 Edward Neville da Costa Andrade
- 1940 Patrick Maynard Stuart Blackett: "Cosmic Rays: Recent Developments"
- 1939 (no lecture)
- 1938 Archibald Vivian Hill: "The transformations of energy and the mechanical work of muscles"
- 1937 Clifford Copland Paterson
- 1936 Frederick A. Lindemann: "Physical Ultimates"
- 1935 Arthur Holly Compton: "An attempt to analyse Cosmic Rays"
- 1934 Charles Vernon Boys: "My recent progress in Gas Calorimetry"
- 1933 Karl Manne Georg Siegbahn
- 1932 Max Planck
- 1931 Richard T Glazebrook
- 1930 Peter Debye
- 1929 Percy Williams Bridgman
- 1928 J. J. Thomson
- 1927 Sir Ernest Rutherford: "Atomic nuclei and their transformations"
- 1926 Charles Fabry
- 1925 Wilhelm Wien
- 1924 Maurice le Duc de Broglie
- 1923 James Hopwood Jeans
- 1922 Niels Bohr: "The Effect of Electric and Magnetic Fields on Spectral Lines"
- 1921 Albert Abraham Michelson: "Some Recent Applications of Interference Methods"
- 1920 Charles Edouarde Guillaume: "The Anomaly of Nickel-Steels"
- 1919 (no lecture)
- 1918 John Cunningham McLennan: "The Origin of Spectra"
- 1917 Paul Langevin
- 1916 William Bate Hardy: "Some Problems of Living Matter"
- 1915 (no lecture)
- 1914 Robert Williams Wood: "Radiation of Gas Molecules Excited by Light"

== See also ==
- Institute of Physics Awards
- List of physics awards
- List of awards named after people
