= Penelope Jane Brown =

Neutron crystallographer

- Education: University of Cambridge
- Known for: Neutron scattering
- Awards: Michael Faraday Medal
- Scientific career
- Institutions: University of Cambridge; Institut Laue–Langevin
- Doctoral students: Gerard H. Lander

Penelope Jane Brown is a neutron crystallographer and served as Senior Scientist at the Institut Laue–Langevin until 2012. In 2002 she became the first woman to win the Institute of Physics Michael Faraday Medal.

== Early life and education ==
Brown studied science at the University of Cambridge. She completed Part I of the natural sciences tripos in 1953 and Part II i 1954. Brown remained at Cambridge for her graduate studies, earning a doctoral degree under the supervision of W H Taylor in 1958. Her PhD considered the crystallographic structures of intermetallic compounds. She remained at the Cavendish Laboratory as a postdoctoral researcher.

== Research and career ==
Brown completed her first neutron scattering measurements at the Brookhaven National Laboratory in 1961, where she worked with B. C. Frazer and R. Nathans. She used polarised neutrons to study hematite. In 1965 Brown was made Assistant Director of Research in the Cavendish Laboratory. She attended the Harwell Summer School on neutron scattering in 1968.

She moved to the Institut Laue–Langevin in 1974, where she worked as a Senior Scientist until she retired in 1994. Brown then continued to work at the Institut Laue–Langevin until 2012, collaborating with many scientists worldwide. Brown extensively used Polarised Neutron Diffraction techniques for measuring Magnetisation densities. She also contributed to the development of the Spherical neutron polarimetry invented by F. Tasset. The polarimeter, called Cryopad (CRYOgenic Polarisation Analysis Device) uses the Meissner effect to separate magnetic field regions whose combination allows to control the neutron beam polarisation. She held Visiting Professor positions at Columbia University and Loughborough University. She worked on magnetic shape-memory alloys and "For her contributions to neutrons in Europe", Brown was awarded the European Neutron Scattering Association Walter Hälg Prize. In 2002 Brown was the first woman to win the Institute of Physics Michael Faraday Medal (then Guthrie medal). To celebrate Brown's achievements, the Institut Laue–Langevin held a meeting with her collaborators. She was made a Fellow of Newnham College, Cambridge in 2003.
