= Gilbert George Lonzarich =

Solid-state physicist

Gilbert "Gil" George Lonzarich (born 1945) is a solid-state physicist and Emeritus Professor of the University of Cambridge. He is particularly noted for his work on superconducting and magnetic materials carried out at the Cavendish Laboratory.

== Life ==
Lonzarich received his BA degree from University of California, Berkeley (1967), his M.S. from the University of Minnesota (1970) and his Ph.D. degree from University of British Columbia (1973). Starting as a postdoc, he has held positions at the University of Cambridge. Since 1997 he is a professor at the Cavendish Laboratory, where he heads the quantum matter group.

== Research ==
The research of Lonzarich focuses on solids where the interaction between electrons can lead to unconventional states of matter. His work has addressed different material classes, including itinerant magnets (such as MnSi), heavy-fermion materials, and ferroelectrics. One groundbreaking result for the field of unconventional superconductivity was the demonstration that the suppression of antiferromagnetic order in heavy-fermion materials, i.e. a quantum-critical point, can induce superconductivity.

Important aspects of the experiments of Lonzarich's group are crystal growth, ultra-low temperatures (mK temperatures), high-pressure experiments, and quantum oscillations (continuing the work of David Shoenberg).

Notable former students in the group of Lonzarich include Piers Coleman, Louis Taillefer, Andrew MacKenzie, and Christian Pfleiderer.

== Awards ==
- Fellow of the Royal Society (1989)
- EPS Europhysics Prize (1989)
- Max Born Prize (1991)
- Guthrie Medal (2007)
- Rumford Medal (2010)
- Kamerlingh Onnes Prize (2015)
