= Henry Hall (physicist) =

British physicist

Henry Hall FRS
- Henry Edgar Hall, FRS © Gonville & Caius College, Cambridge
- Born: Henry Edgar Hall; 28 September 1928; London, England
- Died: 4 December 2015 (aged 87); Bolton, England
- Education: Latymer Upper School; Emmanuel College, Cambridge
- Known for: Low temperature physics
- Spouse: Patricia A Broadbent
- Children: Stephan, Ian and Daphne
- Awards: See list
- Scientific career
- Thesis: The Rotation of Liquid Helium II (1957)
- Doctoral advisors: Donald Osborne; David Shoenberg

Henry Edgar Hall FRS (1928 – 4 December 2015) was a professor of low temperature physics at the University of Manchester. He was the 2004 recipient of the Guthrie Medal and Prize. Hall was awarded a Ph.D. in 1957 from Emmanuel College, Cambridge with thesis title The rotation of liquid helium II. He worked at the University of Manchester from 1958 to 1995, when he retired. He died on 4 December 2015.

== Biography ==
Hall was born in London on 28 September 1928, the son of John Ainger Hall and Elsie (née Chatterton). He attended Lowther Primary School in Barnes until he was nine, when he moved to the preparatory department at Latymer Upper School in Hammersmith. He remained there until he was called up for National Service with the Royal Air Force, serving in Egypt as an electrician. In his last year at school, Hall won an Open Major Scholarship to Emmanuel College, Cambridge. He went up to Emmanuel in 1949 to read natural sciences, and graduated with first class honours.

He was then accepted as a research student in the Royal Society Mond Laboratory, an offshoot of the Cavendish Laboratory where he chose to work on liquid helium, under the supervision, initially, of Donald Osborne and later, David Shoenberg. While waiting for equipment to be built, he wrote a paper explaining some apparently puzzling observations by Kapitsa of the force acting on a source of heat in superfluid helium. The initial experimental results were published in 1955. The background to this complex field is fully described in the Royal Society biographical memoir.

In 1958 Hall was appointed to a lectureship at the University of Manchester, where he remained for the rest of his career. He collaborated with A J F Boyle, D St P Bunbury and others in studies of the newly discovered Mössbauer effect. In 1961 Hall was promoted directly to a professorship. He went on to play an important role in the development of dilution refrigerators. His growing expertise in experiments at very low temperatures led him to studies of the liquid phase of the light isotope of helium, ^{3}He, especially in its superfluid state.

Hall retired in 1995, but continued his research full time until 2000. He ran experiments on non-linear mass currents in ^{3}He-B at near-critical velocities—calling that period ‘my second graduate studies’. He summarized the results in his paper of 2001.

=== Family ===
Hall married physics student Patricia Broadbent in 1962. They had two sons, Stephan and Ian, and a daughter, Daphne.

Henry Edgar Hall died on 4 December 2015 in Millview Care Home, Bolton.

== Awards ==
1963 Simon Memorial Prize, Institute of Physics (with W. F. Vinen)
2004 Guthrie Medal and Prize, Institute of Physics
