= List of fellows of the Royal Society elected in 2014 =

This article lists fellows of the Royal Society who were elected in 2014. For the first time, most fellows portraits are available on Wikimedia Commons, published by the Royal Society under a Creative Commons Attribution-Share-alike (CC BY-SA) license.

== Fellows of the Royal Society (FRS) ==
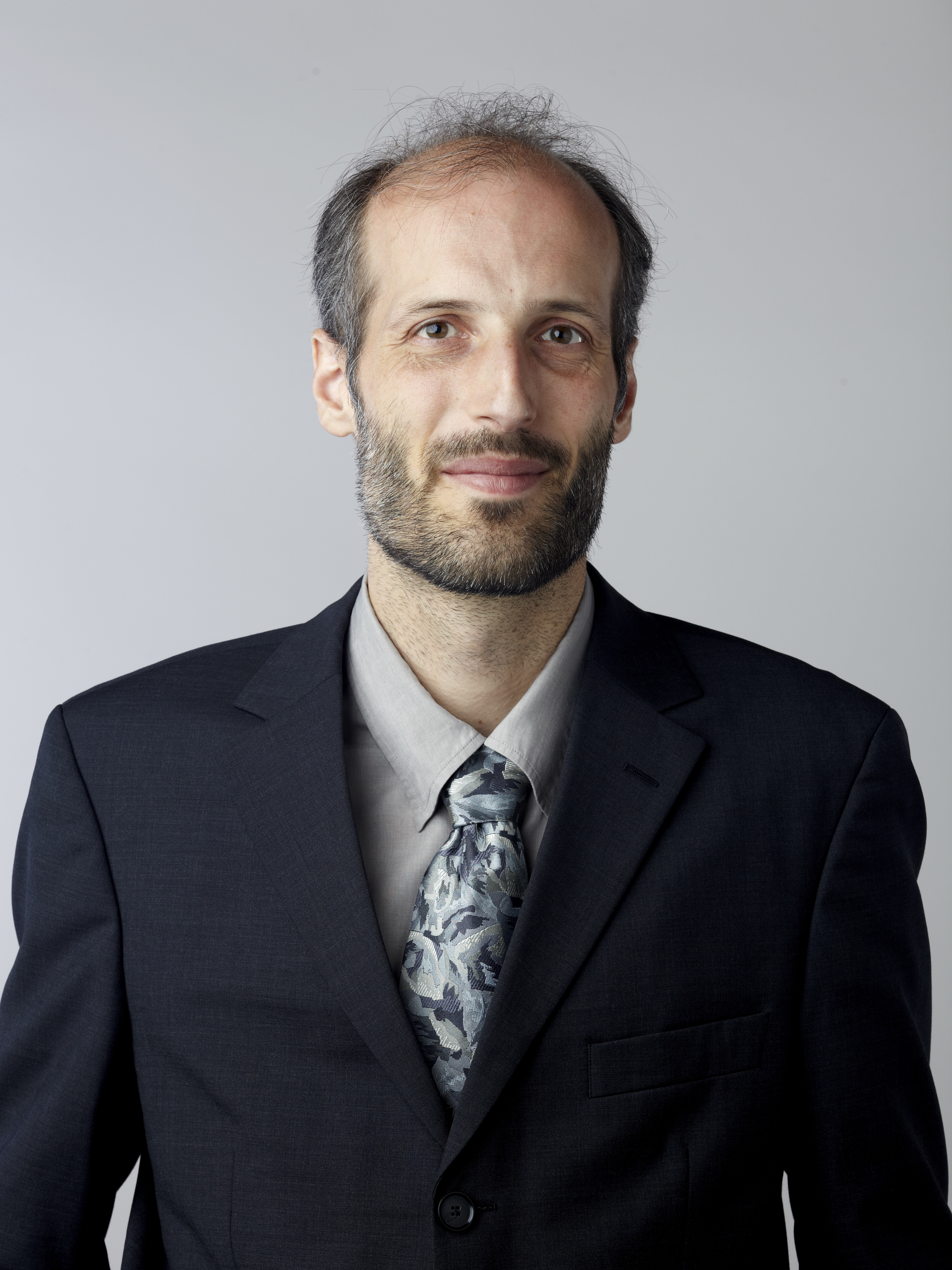
Fields Medal winner Professor Martin Hairer elected FRS in 2014

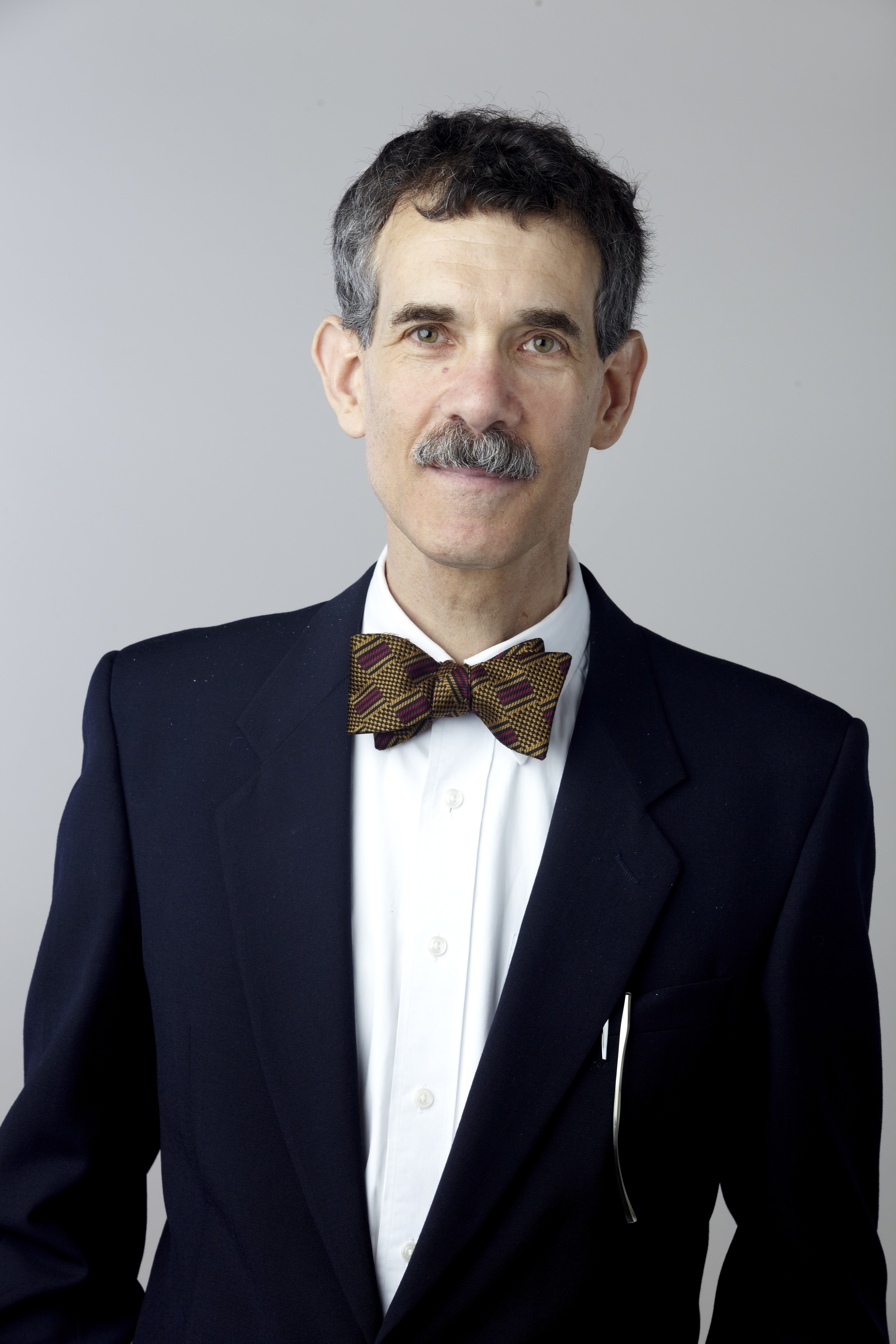
Professor David Ron FMedSci elected FRS in 2014

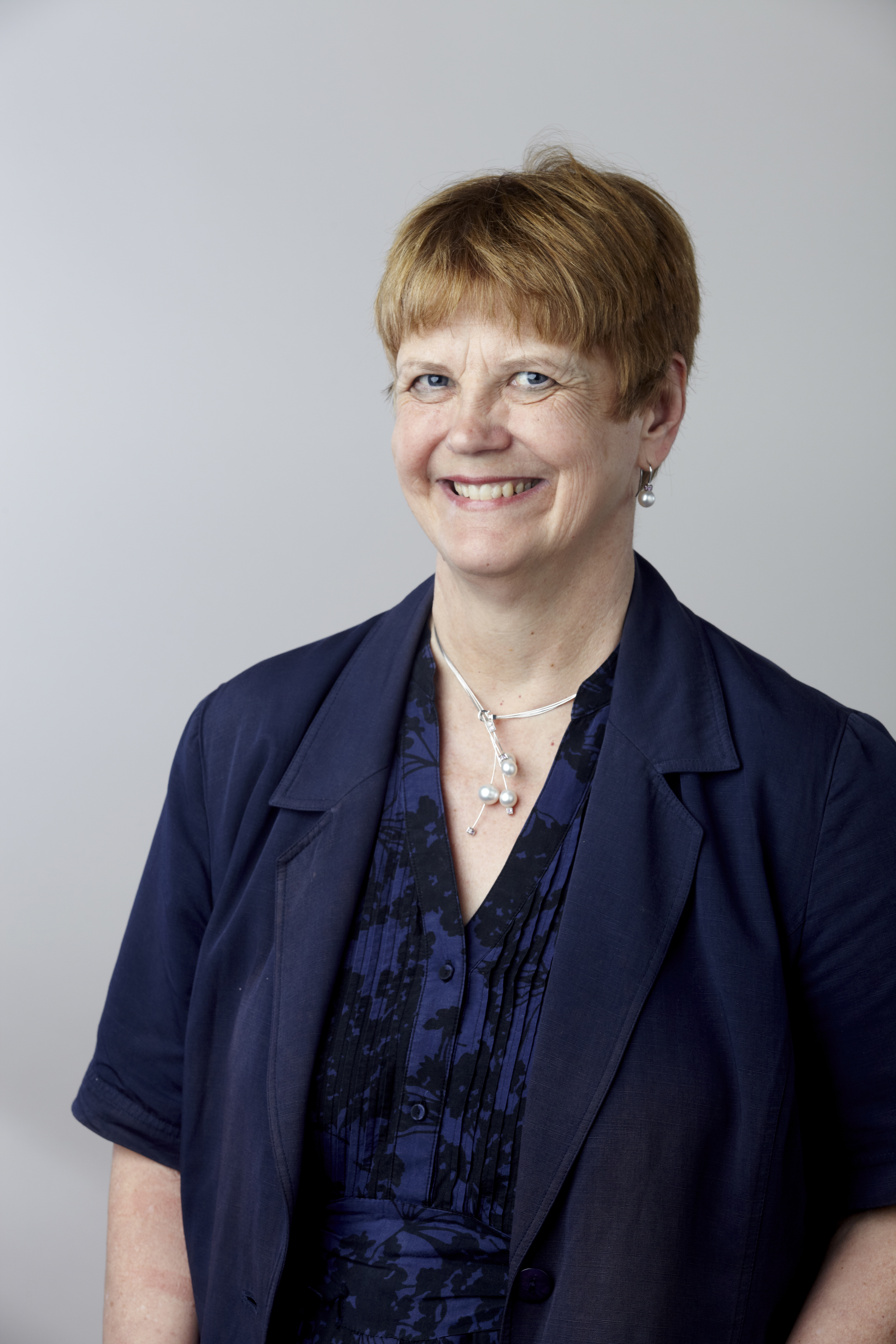
Professor Dorothy Bishop elected FRS in 2014

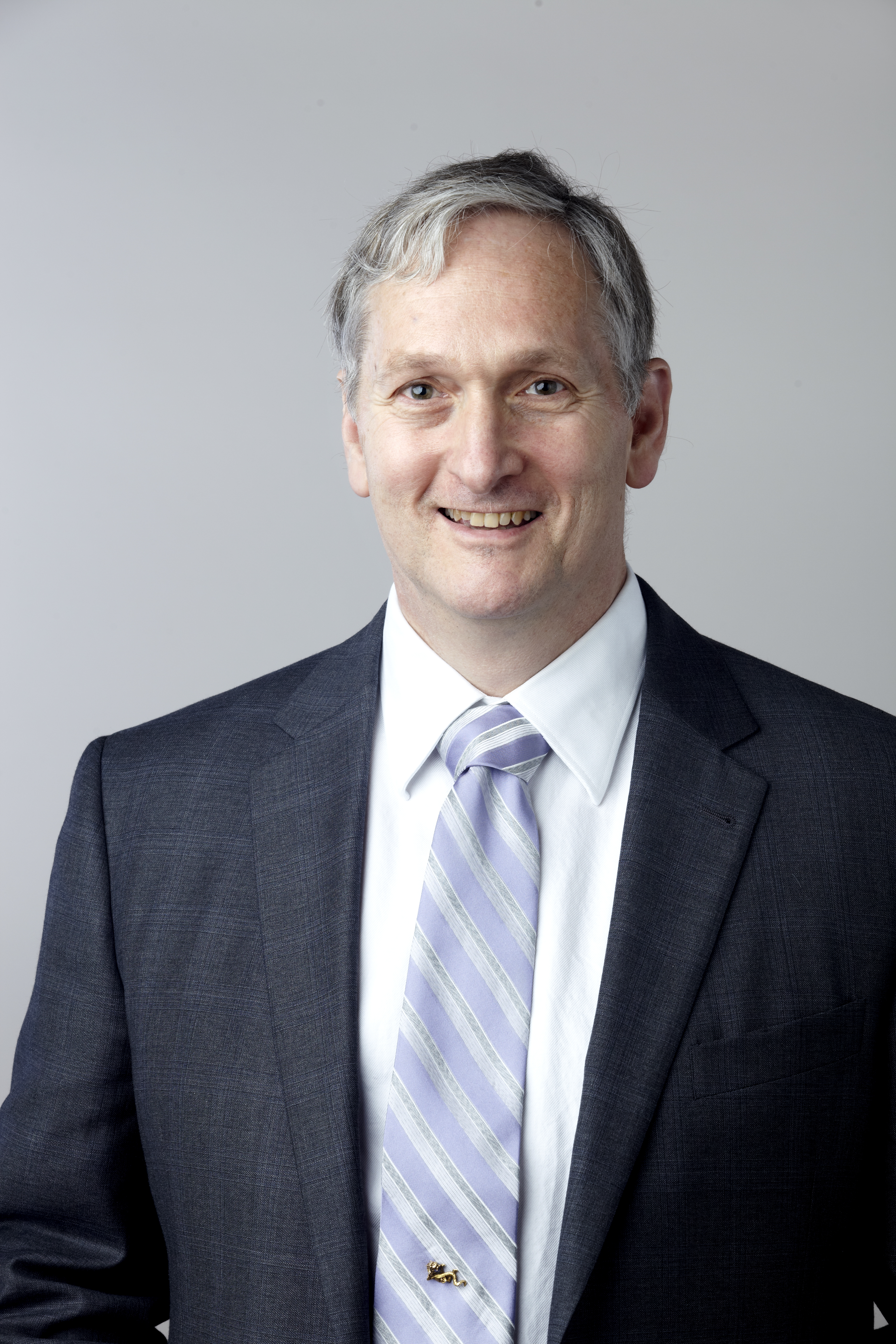
Professor Clifford Tabin elected ForMemRS in 2014

1. Professor Steven Armes FRS
2. Professor Paul Attfield FRS
3. Professor David Beerling FRS
4. Professor Michael Benton FRS
5. Lord Sushantha Bhattacharyya KB CBE FREng FRS
6. Dr Ewan Birney FRS
7. Professor Dorothy Bishop FRS FBA FMedSci
8. Professor Tom Bridgeland FRS
9. Professor David Charlton FRS
10. Professor Peter Colman FRS
11. Professor Steven Cowley FRS
12. Dame Sally Davies DBE FRS
13. Professor Marian Dawkins CBE FRS
14. Dr John Dick FRS
15. Professor Liam Dolan FRS
16. Professor Timothy Eglinton FRS
17. Professor Amanda Fisher FRS
18. Professor Geoffrey Grimmett FRS
19. Professor Martin Hairer FRS
20. Professor Richard Edwin Hills FRS
21. Dr Timothy Holland FRS
22. Professor Martin Johnson FMedSci FRS
23. Professor Peter Keightley FRS
24. Mr Mike Lazaridis OC FRS
25. Professor Timothy Leighton FREng FRS
26. Professor Simon Lilly FRS
27. Dr Michael Lynch OBE FREng FRS
28. Dr Andrew Mackenzie FRS
29. Professor Vladimir Markovic FRS
30. Professor Irwin McLean FMedSci FRS
31. Professor Paul Midgley FRS
32. Professor Gareth Morris FRS
33. Professor James Naismith FMedSci FRS
34. Professor Jenny Nelson FRS
35. Professor Colin Nichols FRS
36. Professor Miles Padgett FRS
37. Dr Julian Parkhill FMedSci FRS
38. Dr Karalyn Patterson FMedSci FRS
39. Professor Sheena Radford FMedSci FRS
40. Professor Randy Read FRS
41. Professor David Ron FMedSci FRS
42. Professor Patrik Rorsman FMedSci FRS
43. Professor Bill Rutherford FRS
44. Mr Colin Smith CBE FREng FRS
45. Dr Alan Soper FRS
46. Lord Nicholas Stern Kt FBA FRS
47. Professor Nicholas Talbot FRS
48. Professor Demetri Terzopoulos FRS
49. Professor Rajesh Thakker FRS
50. Professor Anthony Watts FRS

== Foreign members ==
1. Professor Richard Alley ForMemRS
2. Professor Richard Axel ForMemRS
3. Professor Chunli Bai ForMemRS
4. Professor Steven Chu ForMemRS
5. Professor Stephen Harrison ForMemRS
6. Professor Vincent Poor FREng ForMemRS
7. Professor Philippe Sansonetti ForMemRS
8. Professor Joan Steitz ForMemRS
9. Professor Clifford Tabin ForMemRS
10. Professor Jean-Marie Tarascon ForMemRS
