= Gerard H. Lander =

Gerard Heath Lander
- Born: 1939 (age 86–87); Manila, Philippines
- Education: University of Cambridge
- Awards: Walter Hälg Prize
- Scientific career
- Fields: Physics, neutron and X-ray scattering, actinide materials
- Workplaces: Argonne National Laboratory; Institute for Transuranium Elements; Institut Laue–Langevin
- Doctoral advisor: Penelope Jane Brown

Gerard Heath Lander (born 1939) is a British physicist best known for the neutron and X-ray scattering study of actinide materials. He spent about twenty years at Argonne National Laboratory in the United States, where he directed the Intense Pulsed Neutron Source (IPNS) from 1981 to 1986, and later worked at the European Commission's Institute for Transuranium Elements (ITU) in Karlsruhe, which he directed from 2002 to 2006. He was the founding editor of the magazine Neutron News and received the European Neutron Scattering Association's Walter Hälg Prize in 2011.

Lander is a fellow of the American Physical Society. He was an honorary professor at the Institute of Low Temperature and Structure Research, Polish Academy of Sciences, Wrocław in 2002.

== Early life ==
Lander was born in Manila, in the Philippines, in 1939. His father was John Gerard Heath Lander, who worked for the Asiatic Petroleum Company in Hong Kong and later in Manila; he was posted back to Hong Kong in June 1941 and was killed in its defence on 25 December 1941. Lander and his mother remained in Manila after his father's posting to Hong Kong in June 1941. European women and children were evacuated from the colony the previous year. Following the Japanese invasion they were interned at the Santo Tomas Internment Camp in Manila. After the war the family spent several years in England, living with Lander's paternal grandmother, before moving to South Africa, where he grew up and was educated to master's level. He was awarded an 1851 Exhibition scholarship to study physics at the University of Cambridge, where he completed a PhD in 1966 under the supervision of Penelope Jane Brown, studying the magnetism of manganese–silicon alloys by neutron and X-ray diffraction.

== Career ==
Lander joined Argonne National Laboratory (ANL) in 1967 as a postdoctoral researcher, joining a group working on the physics and chemistry of actinides, and remained there until 1979. In 1976 and 1977 he spent a sabbatical year at the CEA and the Institut Laue–Langevin (ILL) in Grenoble, France, beginning collaborations with Jean Rossat-Mignod and Bill Stirling. He moved to the ILL in 1979. Lander became director of the Intense Pulsed Neutron Source (IPNS) at Argonne in November 1981 and held the post until 1986. IPNS, which had begun delivering beam in August 1981, was the world's first pulsed spallation neutron source open to external users. A Department of Energy review panel had recommended in 1980 that the facility be terminated in favour of a competing source at Los Alamos National Laboratory, and the department had decided to end IPNS funding in 1983. During Lander's tenure Argonne's management lobbied against the closure and a second review panel reported favourably in December 1982, after which the Department of Energy extended funding. Lander concentrated on improving accelerator performance, instrument development and the user programme, drawing on the user facility model he had seen at the ILL.

In 1986 Lander moved to the European Commission's Institute for Transuranium Elements (ITU) in Karlsruhe, Germany, where he was group leader of basic actinide research. He served as director of ITU from 2002 until his retirement at the beginning of 2006. After retiring he settled in Grenoble and continued to work on actinide research, and he has been a visiting professor in the School of Physics at the University of Bristol. He has been associated with a research programme on uranium-based thin films that began at the University of Oxford and transferred to Bristol in 2011.

In 1989 Lander was approached by John Axe of Brookhaven National Laboratory to start a magazine for the neutron scattering community, and thus he became the founding editor of Neutron News.

Lander gave public lectures on the history of physics between 1932 and 1942.

== Research ==
Lander studied the electronic, magnetic and structural properties of actinide (5f-electron) materials, chiefly by neutron and resonant X-ray scattering. He showed that the ratio of the orbital to spin magnetic moment (−μ_{L}/μ_{S}) of the 5f electrons serves as a diagnostic of their localization: a reduction of the ratio relative to the value expected for localized electrons, arising mainly through a reduced orbital moment, reflects 5f delocalization.

From the 1960s, the low-temperature behaviour of uranium metal was unexplained, as elastic constant measurements indicated a phase transition near 43 K that diffraction did not initially detect. Lander showed that this transition is a charge density wave (CDW) and that α-uranium is the only element known to form a three-dimensional charge-density wave. Working with J. C. Marmeggi and others, he established by neutron diffraction that α-uranium forms three successive charge-density waves, the lowest-temperature α_{3} phase (below about 22 K) being commensurate with the lattice. He and Chen later resolved the superlattice reflections of all three directly by recording electron diffraction from individual grains in a transmission electron microscope and imaging them with dark-field techniques. Lander also co-authored a 1994 review with E. S. Fisher and S. D. Bader that is cited as a standard reference on the subject.

Near 30.8 K, Uranium dioxide (UO_{2}) undergoes a first-order transition. Faber and Lander studied it using neutron diffraction and scattering technique in 1976, and showed that below this temperature UO_{2} adopts a type-I antiferromagnetic structure and that it is accompanied by an internal distortion of the oxygen sublattice. Lander also investigated the related dioxide NpO_{2}, whose transition near 25 K could not be explained for decades. While bulk measurements indicated an ordering transition, the absence of ordered magnetic dipole moment was observed in the neutron and Mössbauer experiments. In 2002, Paixão, Caciuffo, Lander and their co-workers used resonant X-ray scattering to identify the symmetry of the low-temperature phase as a triple-q multipolar ordering of the neptunium 5f states. Their work provided evidence for a multipolar, or "hidden", order parameter. Subsequent work has treated NpO_{2} as a canonical hidden-order system and cited the experiment as establishing its structure.

Lander also co-authored neutron scattering experiments on the antiferromagnetic superconductor UPd_{2}Al_{3} that revealed a magnetic excitation at about 1.2 to 1.5 meV in its antiferromagnetic state. One of these studies proposed that the compound's superconductivity is mediated by an interaction between quasiparticles and low-frequency spin fluctuations, a proposal that a review describes as among the more experimentally grounded cases for spin-fluctuation-mediated superconductivity in a heavy-fermion system. Lander was also a co-author of the 2002 report of superconductivity in PuCoGa_{5}, the first plutonium-based superconductor. With a transition temperature of about 18.5 K, it has the highest transition temperature among f-electron (heavy-fermion) systems. Reviews have described the material as a link between heavy-fermion and high-temperature cuprate superconductors, a connection attributed to the partially localised character of plutonium's 5f electrons.

In 2015 Lander was among the authors of an inelastic neutron scattering study of plutonium metal carried out with colleagues at Los Alamos National Laboratory and Oak Ridge National Laboratory. Conventional band-structure treatments of plutonium's structural properties invoke magnetic order, which experiments had never detected. The measurements showed that the magnetism of plutonium is not absent but dynamic, and that it is the signature of an electronic ground state combining localised and itinerant 5f configurations. Subsequent theoretical work has used the experiment as a benchmark for calculations of the energy scale of magnetic fluctuations in δ-plutonium.

== Awards and honours ==
- 1851 Exhibition scholarship
- Fellow of the American Physical Society (1980)
- Visiting Professor, Universities of Keele and Liverpool
- John Wheatley Scholar, Los Alamos National Laboratory (2001)
- Honorary Professor, Institute of Low Temperature and Structure Research, Polish Academy of Sciences, Wrocław (2002)
- Walter Hälg Prize, European Neutron Scattering Association (2011)

== Selected publications ==
- Faber, J.; Lander, G. H.; Cooper, B. R. (29 December 1975). "Neutron-Diffraction Study of U O 2 : Observation of an Internal Distortion". Physical Review Letters. 35 (26): 1770–1773. doi:10.1103/PhysRevLett.35.1770.
- Lander, G.H.; Fisher, E.S.; Bader, S.D. (February 1994). "The solid-state properties of uranium A historical perspective and review". Advances in Physics. 43 (1): 1–111. Bibcode:1994AdPhy..43....1L. doi:10.1080/00018739400101465.
- Sarrao, J. L.; Morales, L. A.; Thompson, J. D.; Scott, B. L.; Stewart, G. R.; Wastin, F.; Rebizant, J.; Boulet, P.; Colineau, E.; Lander, G. H. (November 2002). "Plutonium-based superconductivity with a transition temperature above 18 K". Nature. 420 (6913): 297–299. Bibcode:2002Natur.420..297S. doi:10.1038/nature01212. PMID 12447434.
- Heathman, S.; Haire, R. G.; Le Bihan, T.; Lindbaum, A.; Idiri, M.; Normile, P.; Li, S.; Ahuja, R.; Johansson, B.; Lander, G. H. (July 2005). "A High-Pressure Structure in Curium Linked to Magnetism". Science. 309 (5731): 110–113. Bibcode:2005Sci...309..110H. doi:10.1126/science.1112453. PMID 15994550.
- Santini, Paolo; Carretta, Stefano; Amoretti, Giuseppe; Caciuffo, Roberto; Magnani, Nicola; Lander, Gerard H. (2 June 2009). "Multipolar interactions in f -electron systems: The paradigm of actinide dioxides". Reviews of Modern Physics. 81 (2): 807–863. Bibcode:2009RvMP...81..807S. doi:10.1103/RevModPhys.81.807.
- Springell, R.; Lawrence Bright, E.; Chaney, D. A.; Harding, L. M.; Bell, C.; Ward, R. C. C.; Lander, G. H. (2 October 2022). "A review of uranium-based thin films". Advances in Physics. 71 (3–4): 87–165. arXiv:2307.01018. Bibcode:2022AdPhy..71...87S. doi:10.1080/00018732.2023.2230292.
- Caciuffo, R.; Lander, G. H.; van der Laan, G. (3 March 2023). "Synchrotron radiation techniques and their application to actinide materials". Reviews of Modern Physics. 95 (1) 015001. arXiv:2211.02704. Bibcode:2023RvMP...95a5001C. doi:10.1103/RevModPhys.95.015001.
