= Philip Withers =

British materials scientist (born 1963)

Philip Withers FRS FREng
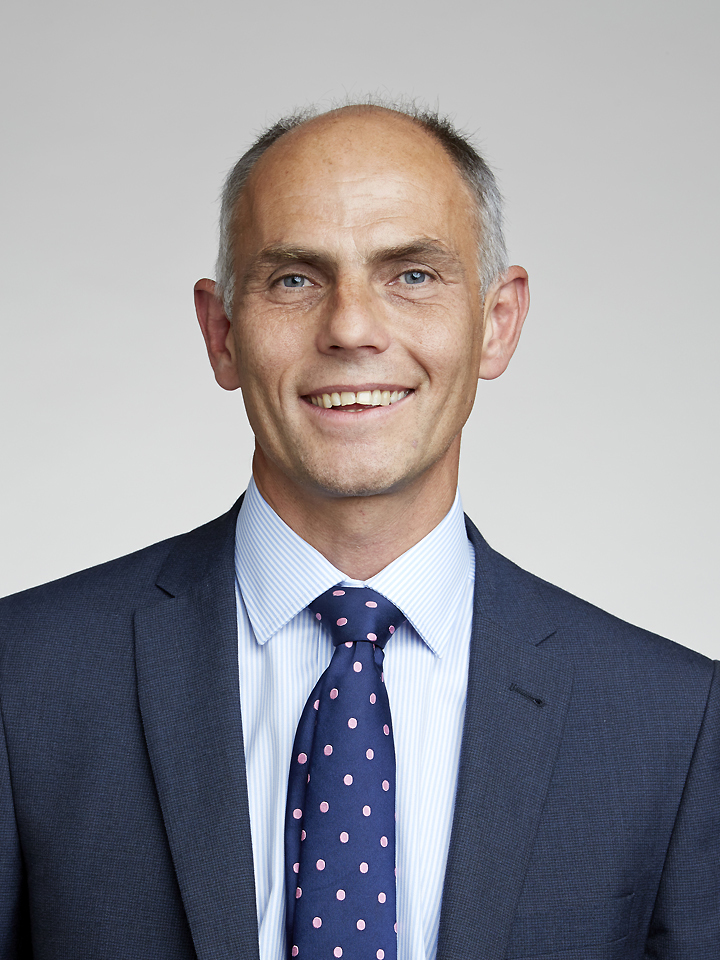
- Withers in 2016
- Born: May 1963 (age 62)
- Awards: Armourers and Brasiers' Company Prize; Queen's Anniversary Prize
- Scientific career
- Fields: Engineering materials; Computed tomography
- Thesis: The development of the Eshelby model and its application to metal matrix composites (1988)
- Website: www.manchester.ac.uk/research/P.j.withers

Philip John Withers (born May 1963) is the Regius Professor of Materials in the School of Materials, University of Manchester.

== Education ==
Withers was educated at the University of Cambridge where he was awarded an undergraduate degree in Natural Sciences (Physics) in 1985 followed by a PhD degree in the metallurgy of Metal Matrix Composites (MMCs) in 1988.

== Career and research ==
Following his doctorate, Withers was appointed a lecturer at Cambridge before being appointed Professor at the University of Manchester in 1998. His research investigates the application of advanced techniques to follow the behaviour of engineering and natural materials in real time and in 3D.

In 2008 Withers set up the Henry Moseley Manchester X-ray Imaging Facility (MXIF), which has extensive suites of 3D X-ray Imaging facilities. In 2012, Withers became the inaugural Director of the BP International Centre for Advanced Materials (ICAM) aimed understanding and developing materials across the energy industry. ICAM is a collaboration between BP, The University of Manchester, The University of Cambridge, Imperial College London and the University of Illinois at Urbana–Champaign.

With Bill Clyne, he is a co-author of the textbook An Introduction to Metal Matrix Composites. His research has been funded by the Engineering and Physical Sciences Research Council (EPSRC).

== Awards and honours ==
Withers was elected a Fellow of the Royal Academy of Engineering (FREng) in 2005 and a Fellow of the Royal Society (FRS) in 2016. In 2014, the University of Manchester was awarded the Queen's Anniversary Prize, recognising Withers work at the Manchester X-ray Imaging Facility. He was elected a Fellow of the International Core Academy of Sciences and Humanities in 2024.
