= The Campion School =

Coordinates: 51°34′55″N 0°13′56″E

Location
- Wingletye Lane; Hornchurch, Greater London, RM11 3BX; England

Information
- Type: Academy
- Motto: Auctore Deo - The Enterprise is of God; it is begun, it cannot be withstood.
- Religious affiliation: Roman Catholic
- Established: September 1962; 64 years ago
- Founders: Father Swindells and Father Maher (Rectors of Stamford Hill)
- Department for Education URN: 137040 Tables
- Ofsted: Reports
- Headmaster: P Larner
- Gender: Boys
- Age: 11 to 18
- Capacity: 1200
- New Anthem: The Essence of our Call
- Anthem: Jerusalem
- Website: http://www.thecampionschool.org.uk

The Campion School is a Roman Catholic boys' comprehensive secondary school and coeducational sixth form in Hornchurch, London, England. The school converted to academy status in August 2011, and has a specialism in science.

== History ==
The Campion School was founded in September 1962 by the Society of Jesus as a grammar school for Roman Catholic boys from the ages of 11 to 18. The first headmaster Fr Michael Fox SJ died that year. In 1965, after two successive headmasters, administration of the school was handed on to the Diocese of Brentwood. On opening, some of the original second and third year intake were transferred from St Ignatius' College, which was then located in Stamford Hill. For the first couple of years, Jesuit teachers were in the majority. The Jesuit community lived on the school site in rooms with full facilities in The Community House, which later became the first of three Sixth Form Blocks. Later, only a single, non-residential, Jesuit chaplain was retained as a link to the order.

Pupils who attend the school are mainly Catholic and the school has a Catholic ethos. Around 1970, the first girls to attend Campion came from Ilford Ursuline School for specific sixth form classes such as Russian and Greek at the school, but there were not many. The school has an attached Sixth Form which admits a number of girls.

The school has been the subject of a number of Ofsted reports. The latest was published in 2022.. The school was awarded Specialist Science College status before converting to an academy in August 2011. however the school continues to offer science as a specialism.

== Forms / Classes ==
In the first year of the school there were three forms (years) each with three classes named A, B and C. In the second year the classes were renamed Fox, Fisher and More after Fr Michael Fox SJ and Saints John Fisher and Thomas More. However, each boy also belonged to a House named Gerard, Southwell and Garnet, denoted by a green, blue or red ribbon strip sewn the length of the top of the blazer pocket edge. The Houses met regularly, had a House Master and competed in sports. Later, for a year or two, school blazers even had a different crests for Fourth, Fifth and Sixth forms too.

The school currently has five classes for each form:

- Fisher
- More
- Fox
- Garnet
- Southwell

== Sport ==
The school has an outstanding sporting reputation both locally in Havering and nationally with a tradition of rugby. In 2001, The 1st XV won the Daily Mail Cup, becoming the first comprehensive school to win the competition.

== Headmasters ==
- Fr Michael J Fox, S.J. (1 March-27 October 1962)
- Fr William Webb, S.J. (Deputy and Acting) (28 October 1962 – 6 April 1963)
- Fr Peter Hackett, S.J. (7 April 1963 – 1965)
- Philip J. Moloney (1965–18 July 1980)
- Dr John F Rowbottom (2 September 1980 – 1993)
- John Johnson (1993–2011)
- Keith Williams (September 2011–July 2022)
- Paul Larner (September 2022-)

== Notable former pupils ==
- David Alton – politician
- Paul McCreesh – conductor
- Damian Cronin – ex-Scotland rugby player
- Tony Diprose – rugby player
- Alex Iwobi - football player
- Danny Donnelly - record producer/ label owner
- Colin Lynes – IBO light welterweight world champion
- John Rudd – rugby player
- Alan Soper – scientist
- Kevin Sorrell – rugby player
- Denis Keefe — Diplomat
- Frank Key - Author

== Notable popular culture references ==
Sounds of Silence is the second studio album by American folk rock duo Simon & Garfunkel, released in 1966. The album cover photo features the duo on a trail looking back towards the camera. It was shot at Franklin Canyon Park in Los Angeles. The secondary school scarves they are wearing were from The Campion School, Hornchurch, UK. This school was attended by the boys of the Brentwood family, with whom Paul Simon lodged during his time in the UK.
