= Roy Sambles =

British physicist (born 1945)

Sir Roy Sambles Kt FRS HonFInstP
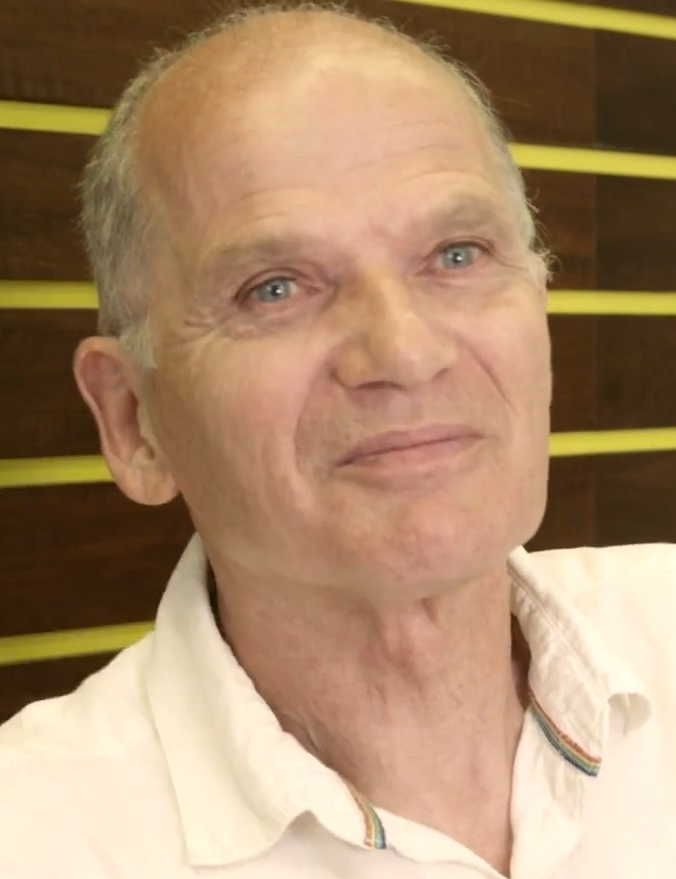
- Sambles in 2012
- Born: 1945 (age 80–81); Callington, Cornwall
- Education: Imperial College London
- Known for: liquid crystal physics, surface plasmons, microwave photonics, Metamaterials, Natural Photonics
- Awards: Young Medal and Prize (2002); Faraday Medal and Prize (2012)
- Scientific career
- Fields: Physicist
- Workplaces: University of Exeter

Sir John Roy Sambles FRS HonFInstP (born 1945) is an English experimental physicist and a former President of the Institute of Physics.

Sambles, originally from Callington in Cornwall, studied physics at Imperial College, London, gaining his BSc and PhD degrees there, and has since published over 550 papers in international journals. He was elected a Fellow of the Royal Society in May 2002.

Sambles was Professor of Experimental Physics at the University of Exeter from 1991 to 2022. He has a long and distinguished career researching the interaction of light with matter. His group at Exeter studied a wide range of systems including: liquid crystal devices; iridescent butterfly wings; surface plasmons and microwave photonics. These studies have applications in liquid crystal displays for televisions and computer displays, highly sensitive detection of materials (e.g. for medical diagnosis), and optical and microwave communication.

In 2008, he was appointed to the Engineering and Physical Sciences Research Council.

Sambles was knighted in the 2020 Birthday Honours for services to scientific research and outreach.

== Personal life ==
Roy Sambles and his wife, Sandra (née Sloman), had three children. One of his three children, Ivan Sambles, has gone on to teach Highschool mathematics at Elmwood School in Ottawa after completing a degree at Exeter university

Sambles is a Methodist local preacher and has served in that capacity for over 30 years, preaching in the Ringsash Methodist Circuit in Mid Devon.

== Edited books ==
- 1998: (edited with Steve Elston) The Optics of Thermotropic Liquid Crystals. London: Taylor & Francis ISBN 978-0-7484-0629-6

== Awards ==
- 1998 - the George William Gray medal of the British Liquid Crystal Society.
- 2002 - Elected as a Fellow of the Royal Society.
- 2003 - Young Medal and Prize, for distinguished research in the field of optics presented by the Institute of Physics.
- 2012 - Faraday Medal and Prize, "For his pioneering research in experimental condensed matter physics."
