= Lorna Gibson =

American materials scientist and engineer

- Born: Lorna Jane Gibson
- Education: University of Toronto (BASc); University of Cambridge (PhD)
- Scientific career
- Fields: Materials science
- Workplaces: Massachusetts Institute of Technology; University of British Columbia
- Thesis: The elastic and plastic behaviour of cellular materials (1981)
- Doctoral advisor: Michael F. Ashby
- Website: lornagibson.org

Lorna Jane Gibson is an American materials scientist and engineer currently the Matoula S. Salapatas Professor of Materials Science and Engineering at Massachusetts Institute of Technology.

== Education ==
Lorna Gibson received her Bachelor of Applied Science (BASc) in Civil Engineering from the University of Toronto in 1978. Gibson then attended the University of Cambridge, where she received her PhD in Materials Engineering in 1981 for research supervised by Michael F. Ashby, and focused on the elastic and plastic behavior of cellular materials.

== Career and research ==
After receiving her PhD, Gibson worked as a Senior Engineer at Arctec Canada Ltd., which she left to work in academia.

Gibson worked as an Assistant Professor in Civil Engineering at the University of British Columbia from 1982 to 1984. Gibson then moved to MIT where she became an Associate Professor of Civil Engineering in 1984, and an Associate Professor of Mechanical Engineering in 1987. Gibson became a full professor in both departments in 1995, and a Professor of Materials Science and Engineering in 1996. Since 1997, she has been the Matoula S. Salapatas Professor of Materials Science and Engineering. Gibson also served as Chair of the Faculty from 2005 to 2006 and was Associate Provost from 2006 to 2008.

In 2005, Gibson founded OrthoMimetics Ltd. and served as its Mechanics of Materials Advisor. In 2009, OrthoMimetics was acquired by Belgian company TiGenix in a deal valued at £14.3 million.

== Awards and honors ==
In 2015, Gibson was named a MacVicar Faculty Fellow, MIT's top award for undergraduate teaching.

In April 2016, Gibson received MIT's Teaching with Digital Technology Award for innovative use of digital tools in education.

In March 2017, Gibson received the Ellen Swallow Richards Diversity Award for promoting equality and diversity.

In April 2017, she won the Bose Award for Excellence in Teaching for her outstanding contributions to undergraduate education.
