= Alan Soper =

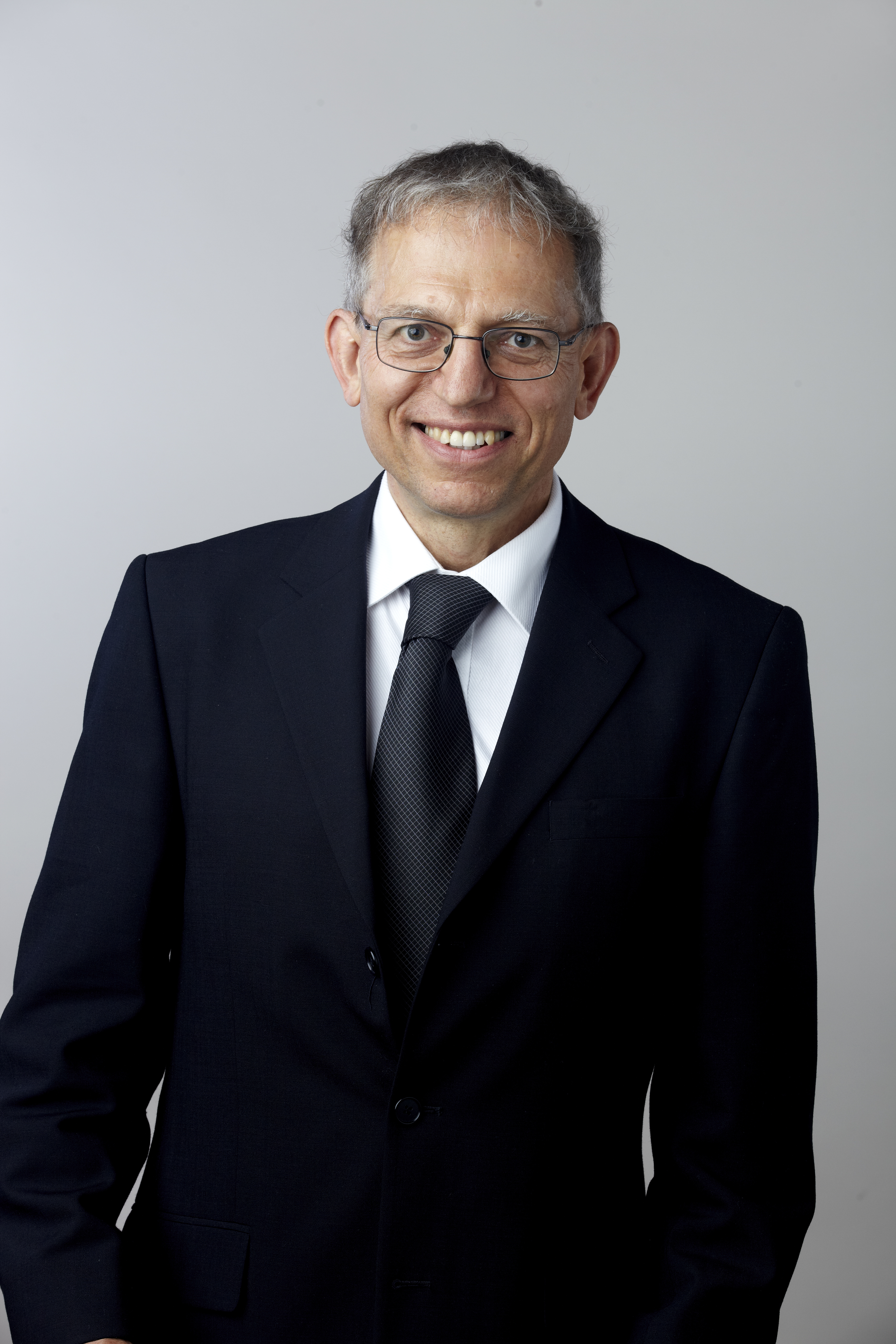
- Alan Soper at the Royal Society admissions day in London, July 2014
- Born: Alan Kenneth Soper; 15 June 1951 (age 75); Romford, Essex
- Education: University of Leicester (BSc, PhD)
- Awards: FRS (2014); ISIS Senior Fellow (2009)
- Scientific career
- Fields: Aqueous solutions; Neutron diffraction
- Workplaces: Rutherford Appleton Laboratory; Los Alamos National Laboratory; University of Guelph
- Thesis: The Structure of Aqueous Solutions (1977)
- Doctoral advisor: John Enderby
- Website: isis.stfc.ac.uk/People/alan_soper5044.html

Alan Kenneth Soper (born 1951) FRS is an STFC Senior Fellow at the ISIS neutron source based at the Rutherford Appleton Laboratory in Oxfordshire.

== Education ==
Soper was educated at The Campion School and the University of Leicester where he was awarded a Bachelor of Science degree in 1973 followed by a PhD in 1977 for research into the structure of aqueous solutions conducted at the Institut Laue–Langevin in Grenoble supervised by John Enderby.

== Career ==
Before moving to RAL in 1997, Soper was a postdoctoral researcher and assistant professor in the Physics Department at the University of Guelph, Ontario in Canada and a staff member at the Los Alamos National Laboratory at Los Alamos, New Mexico in the United States.

== Research ==
Soper's research investigates molecular-level structures in structurally disordered systems. Soper was chair of the prestigious Gordon Research Conference on Water and Aqueous Solutions in 2008 and is the co-designer of the Near and InterMediate Range Order Diffractometer (NIMROD) instrument on the ISIS neutron source.

Soper is a world expert in the structure of water and water-based solutions at the molecular level. Using experimental techniques such as neutron and X-ray diffraction, combined with computer simulation and structure refinement, Soper investigates the organisation and behaviour of water molecules, including their interaction with other molecules and surfaces. His work has relevance given the importance of water in the biochemical processes of living organisms.

He has characterised the structure of water under extreme conditions – as found miles down at the bottom of the ocean – and in heavily confined water such as occurs in nanoscopic mineral cavities. He has observed that this water is likely to be under significant tension – about −1000 atmospheres.

== Awards and honours ==
Soper was elected a Fellow of the Royal Society (FRS) in 2014. His nomination reads:

Alan Soper is distinguished as the world leading experimentalist on the structure of water and aqueous solutions, and an internationally outstanding expert on the structure of liquids in general. Besides making major and seminal contributions to the study of water and other aqueous systems, including complex systems of high chemical and biological importance, he has been influential in studies of many other liquids and glasses, and has developed novel diffraction instruments and techniques that have revolutionised the field. He has also pioneered the wider use of computer simulation as a tool for building three-dimensional models of the disordered states of matter based on measured data.

Soper was made an ISIS neutron source senior research fellow in 2009.
