= Damian Cronin =

British Lions & Scotland international rugby union player

- Born: Damian Cronin; 17 April 1963 (age 63) Wegberg, West Germany
- Height: 6 ft 6 in (198 cm)
- Weight: 17 st 8 lb (112 kg)

Rugby union career
- Position: Lock
Amateur team(s)
Years	Team	Apps	(Points)
1986-89	Bath		
1990-94	London Scottish		
1994-95	Bourges		
Senior career
Years	Team	Apps	(Points)
1996-98	Wasps		
Provincial / State sides
Years	Team	Apps	(Points)
-	Anglo-Scots		
International career
Years	Team	Apps	(Points)
1988	Scotland 'B'	1	
1990-96	Scotland 'A'	8	
1988-98	Scotland	45	
1993	British and Irish Lions		

Damian Cronin (born 17 April 1963 in Wegberg, West Germany) is a former Scotland international rugby union player.

== Rugby Union career ==
=== Amateur career ===
He was educated at The Campion School and Prior Park College.

Before becoming professional, Cronin played for Bath and London Scottish. When the Rugby World Cup of 1995 began Cronin was playing for the French club Bourges.

=== Provincial and professional career ===
Cronin played for the Anglo-Scots district in the Scottish Inter-District Championship.

When rugby union turned professional, Cronin played for Wasps.

=== International career ===
He qualified for Scotland based on his grandparents from Musselburgh.

He was capped by Scotland 'B' against Italy in 1988.

He was capped by Scotland 'A' 8 times between 1990 and 1996.

Playing in the second row, he was part of the Grand Slam winning side in 1990. He made his Scotland debut 16 January 1988 against Ireland with his last appearance ten years later against England. In all he won 45 caps and scored 5 tries. He played in the 1991 and 1995 World Cups whilst being a member of London Scottish.

Cronin had a reputation as a prankster. This anecdote from the Glasgow Herald in 1998 is described as the 'crowning moment' of his career:

That occasion was 1995 in Paris when Scotland beat France for the first and only time at the modern Parc des Princes. However, for Cronin the day's highlight came when the crowning moment in his career as a serial prankster arrived at the post-match dinner. Gavin Hastings, buoyant having scored the try which clinched that win, had asked Cronin, then playing in France with Bourges, to help him write his speech so he could make it in French. The direct translation of what was read out does not bear repetition, but suffice to say there was widespread shock among his hosts at the frankness of the Scotland captain's account of how he had spent the hours between the game finishing and getting to the function.

He was also a British and Irish Lion as he went on the 1993 tour to New Zealand.

== Business career ==
He is a Director at Woodstone, a wood and stone floor-fitting company.
