= Whitley Academy =

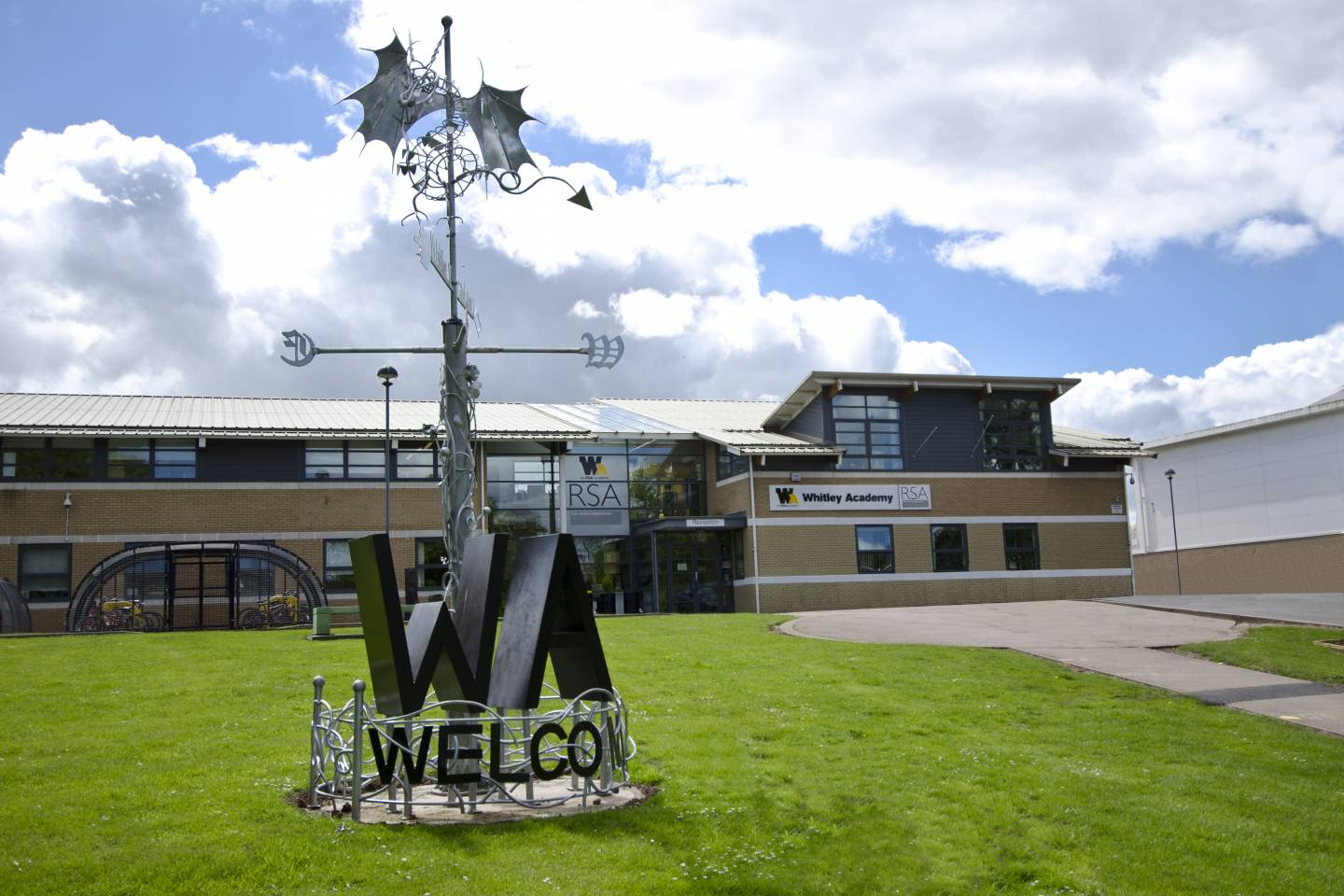

Location
- Abbey Road; Coventry, West Midlands, CV3 4BD; England
- 52.38631°N 1.48685°W

Information
- Type: Academy
- Motto: Facta non verba (Deeds not words); Be the best you can be
- Established: 1950s and rebuilt 2000
- Local authority: Coventry City Council
- Trust: Finham Park Multi Academy Trust
- Department for Education URN: 148429 Tables
- Ofsted: Reports
- Head teacher: Bernadette Pettman
- Staff: 133
- Gender: Coeducational
- Age: 11 to 18
- Enrolment: 897 pupils
- Website: Official website

Whitley Academy (formerly Whitley Abbey Community School) was a coeducational secondary school and sixth form located in Whitley, Coventry, England. The school was rebuilt and opened on 13 October 2000, replacing the former Whitley Abbey Comprehensive School built in the 1950s, which was one of the first comprehensive schools in Coventry. As of 28 January 2021, the school is permanently closed.

In July 2007, Whitley Abbey Community School gained specialist status in Business and Enterprise and was renamed Whitley Abbey Business and Enterprise College.

On 1 July 2011 Whitley Abbey Business and Enterprise College became an Academy and was renamed to 'Whitley Academy'.

The new academy was formally opened on 13 March 2012 by the Princess Royal. It was one of the seven schools in the RSA Family of Academies, all in the West Midlands, of the Royal Society of Arts. In July 2019 the governors of the school decided to leave the RSA.

In January 2021 the school joined the Finham Park Multi Academy Trust and was renamed to Meadow Park School.

== Ofsted ==
Whitley has been inspected by Ofsted 3 times in the last 10 years. After 9 years of being 'Outstanding', in March 2019 the school received the 'Requires Improvement' grade, with it eventually receiving the 'Inadequate' rating in January 2020, possibly having led to the school's closure a year later, with the school's reputation having been reportedly "ruined".

Ofsted Inspection results for the last 10 years
Date(s) of Inspection	Grade
12 December 2013	Outstanding
6 – 7 March 2019	Requires Improvement
8 – 9 January 2020	Inadequate

== Whitley Arts ==
The website, 'Whitley Arts', was launched in March 2013, as an eCommerce website to sell unique pupil artwork, whilst at the same time showcasing the excellence and artistic flair of Whitley Academy pupils to a local and national audience.

The project idea of Whitley Arts was commissioned by Lorraine Allen, then Principal, after initial discussions with Centre Stage Digital, the school Art Department and the Business Manager.

The website was the first of its nature in Warwickshire, and one of only two such sites nationally, and has raised over £1,000 for pupils and the Whitley Art Faculty. Money raised from Whitley Arts and purchase of pupil art will help support the arts, the pupils and their learning.

== Notable former pupils ==
- Steven Armes FRS, Professor of Chemistry at the University of Sheffield
- Peter Boddington (b. 1942), British heavyweight amateur boxing champion in 1967
- Ian Taylor (b. 1945), politician
- Sir Paul Scott-Lee (b. 1953), Chief Constable of West Midlands Police
- Richard Keys (b. 1957), television sports presenter
- Pete Waterman (b. 1947), record producer
- Andrew Lomas, intellectual property lawyer and elected Councillor for Colville ward in Kensington and Chelsea
- Hitesh Thakrar, Portfolio Manager for Global Innovation Fund at Abu Dhabi Investment Authority (ADIA), awarded Innovation Fellowship by University of Cambridge in 2012
