= Jenny Nelson =

Irish physicist

Jenny Nelson FRS FInstP
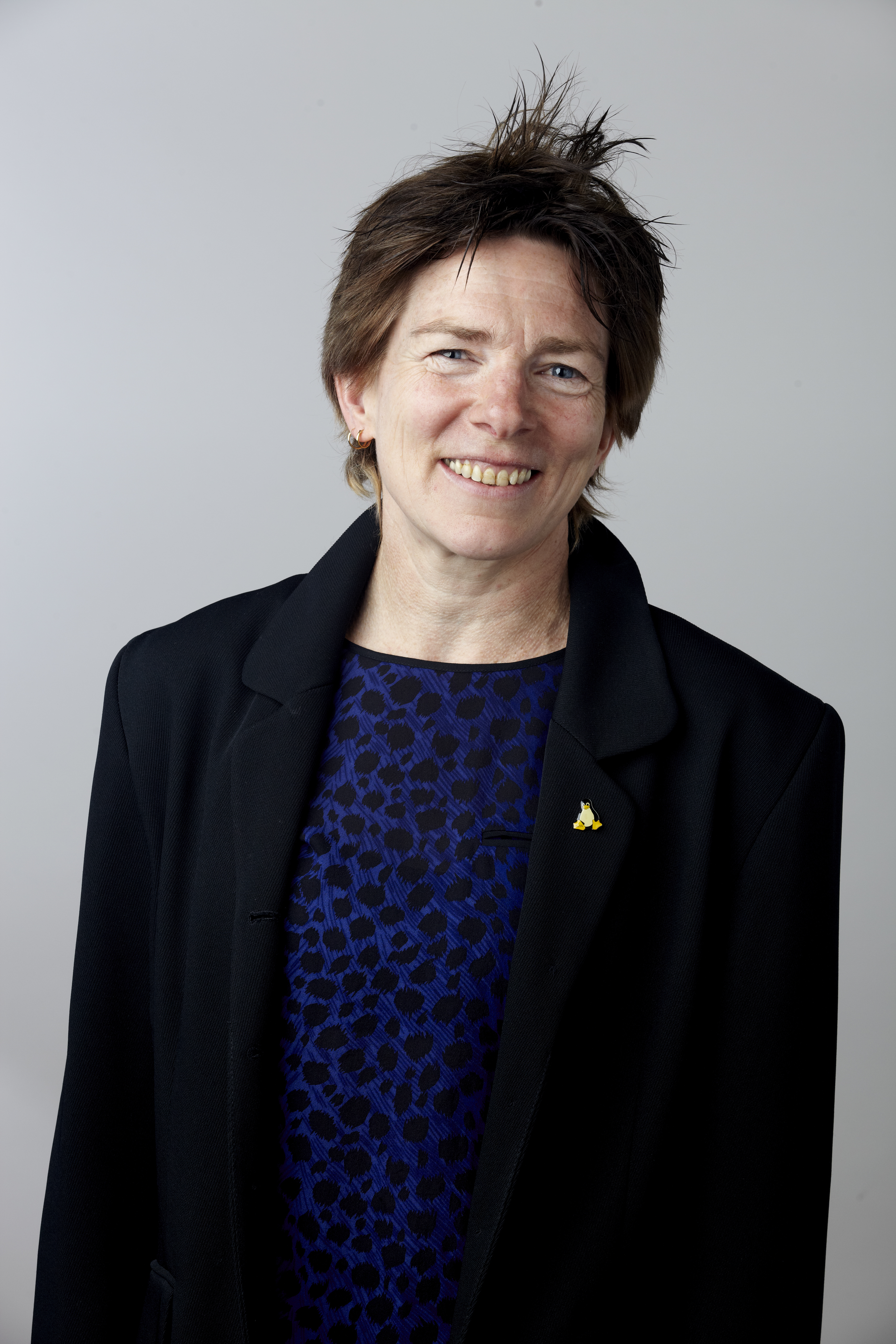
- Jenny Nelson at Royal Society admissions day in London, July 2014
- Born: Jennifer Nelson
- Education: University of Cambridge (BA); University of Bristol (PhD)
- Awards: Armourers and Brasiers' Company Prize (2012); Faraday Medal and Prize (2016)
- Scientific career
- Fields: Solar cells
- Workplaces: Imperial College London
- Thesis: Optics of fractal clusters: with reference to soot (1988)
- Doctoral advisor: Michael Victor Berry
- Website: imperial.ac.uk/people/jenny.nelson

Jenny Nelson FRS FInstP is Professor of Physics in the Blackett Laboratory and Head of the Climate change mitigation team at the Grantham Institute - Climate Change and Environment at Imperial College London.

== Education ==
Nelson was educated at the University of Cambridge and the University of Bristol where she obtained her PhD in 1988 for research on the optics of fractal clusters supervised by Michael Berry.

== Research and career ==
Nelson's research is devoted to characterising the materials used to build and improve photovoltaic devices, which convert energy from the Sun into electricity. She applies a range of tools that include physical models, simulation and experiments to optimise the performance of such devices through their composite materials.

Over the last twenty-five years, Nelson has worked with many types of energy converting materials, ranging from molecular materials to inorganic materials such as nanocrystalline oxides, and organic–inorganic hybrids. She uses information describing the electronic, optical and structural properties of these materials to inform the design of her devices, an approach that has garnered strong interest from industry.

Since 2010, Nelson has also been studying the potential of photovoltaic technologies to reduce the amount of carbon dioxide that is emitted during the generation of electricity, lessening the impact on climate change. She is the author of a popular textbook, The Physics of Solar Cells.

Nelson's research has focused on the development of detailed physical descriptions of novel nanostructured or disordered (organic electronic) materials, the quantitative validation of model results against experimental data, and above all, the application of physical science to address the challenges in energy supply, in particular, in the area of photovoltaic energy conversion. Her work on the functional understanding of organic photovoltaic materials and devices has been her focus since 2000.

Nelson is ranked by the Institute for Scientific Information as one of the top 100 materials scientists in the world on the basis of the impact (citations per paper) of her journal papers published between 2000 and 2010.

In 2013, Nelson joined Welsh Government's Sêr Cymru programme, a £50 million initiative to enhance solar research capability in Wales. Alongside her chair at Imperial, Nelson is Sêr Cymru Joint Chair and Professor of Physics at SPECIFIC, Swansea University. SPECIFIC is located at the Innovation and Knowledge Centre at Baglan Energy Park, and the initiative is widely celebrated as a beacon for progress in Welsh science.

=== Awards and honours ===
Nelson was elected a Fellow of the Royal Society (FRS) in 2014. Her nomination reads:

Jenny Nelson is distinguished for the development of fundamental physical models, simulation tools and experiments to discover and exploit relationships between the performance of photovoltaic devices and the physical and chemical properties of the constituent materials. She has driven advances in the science and design of quantum semiconductor heterostructures, nanocrystalline oxide, conjugated molecular and hybrid organic-inorganic materials. Through analysis of the electronic, optical and structural properties of these materials she has explained device performance, introduced physical models of device function and developed analytical, numerical and experimental tools for characterisation, diagnostics and design, which have attracted the sustained interest and support of industry.

Nelson has also been awarded a Greenpeace Research Fellowship 1989–1992 and 1996–1997, an Engineering and Physical Sciences Research Council (EPSRC) Advanced Research Fellowship 1997–2003, Institute of Physics James Joule Medal and Prize in 2009, Armourers and Brasiers' Company Prize (2012), and an Industry Fellowship from the Royal Society, 2010 – 2013. In 2016 Nelson won the Institute of Physics Faraday Medal and Prize, for "pioneering advances in the science of nanostructured and molecular semiconductor materials". In 2017 she won the Imperial College Union Student Choice Award for Best Supervision, with students nominating her for her outstanding commitment to their scientific careers: "I came to Jenny at a time when my faith in myself and the scientific process was at all time low. She believed in me when I didn't".
