= Neil Alford =

British materials scientist

Neil Alford MBE FREng FRS
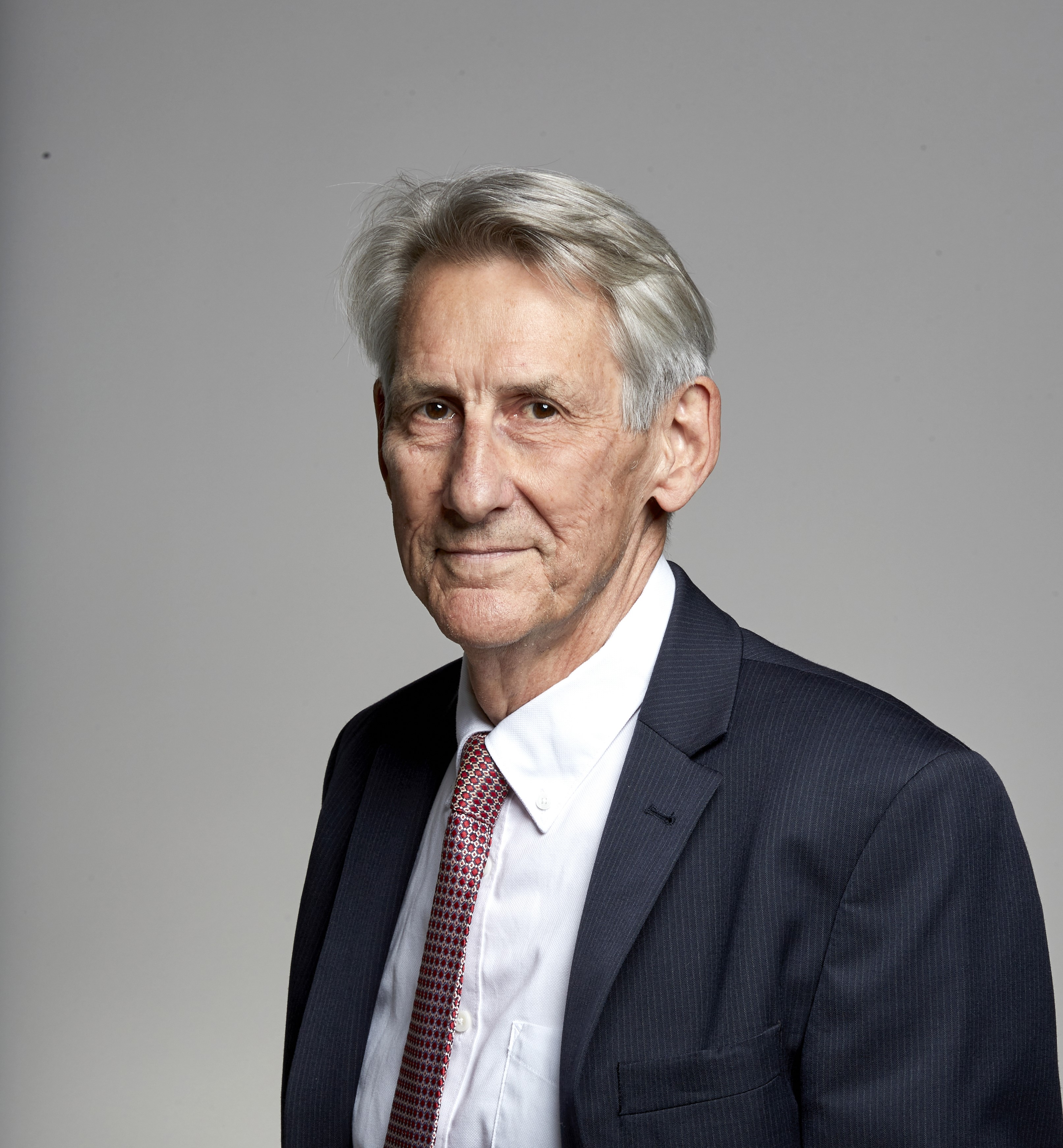
- Born: Neil McNeill Alford
- Education: University of St Andrews (BSc); Queen Mary University of London (PhD)
- Known for: Functional materials Microwave dielectrics Ferroelectric thin films Development of the first room-temperature solid-state maser
- Awards: A. A. Griffith Medal and Prize (2008); Armourers and Brasiers' Company Prize (2016); Michael Faraday Medal and Prize (2023)
- Honors: Member of the Order of the British Empire (2013); Fellow of the Royal Society (2025); Fellow of the Royal Academy of Engineering (2007); Fellow of the Institution of Engineering and Technology (2004); Fellow of the Institute of Materials, Minerals and Mining (1997); Fellow of the American Ceramic Society (2011); Fellow of the Royal Society of Arts (2007)
- Scientific career
- Fields: Materials science
- Workplaces: Imperial College London; London South Bank University

Neil McNeill Alford is a British materials scientist and professor of Physical Electronics and Thin Film Materials at Imperial College London. He is known for research in functional materials, particularly microwave dielectrics, ferroelectric thin films, and the development of the first room-temperature solid-state maser.

== Early life and education ==
Alford received a BSc (Honours) in physics from the University of St Andrews in 1973. He worked as a petroleum engineer in Southeast Asia and South America before returning to the UK to complete a PhD in fracture mechanics at Queen Mary University of London in 1979.

== Career ==
Alford conducted postdoctoral research at the University of Oxford as an ICI Fellow, developing high-strength cement with Imperial Chemical Industries (ICI). He later worked at the ICI Corporate Laboratory from 1981 to 1994 on cement, ceramics, and high-temperature superconductors, with applications that were later commercialised by ISCO International.

In 1994 Alford was appointed professor and Pro-Dean of Faculty at London South Bank University, where he researched superconducting magnetic resonance coils, microwave dielectrics, and ferroelectric thin films. His work on ultra-low-loss alumina resonators and TiO_{2} defect chemistry contributed to high-performance dielectric materials used by Antenova, a communications company specialising in antennas.

Alford joined Imperial College London in 2007 as Professor of Physical Electronics and Thin Film Materials. He subsequently held a series of senior leadership positions at the institution, including Head of the Department of Materials from 2010 to 2015, Vice-Dean (Research) of the Faculty of Engineering from 2011 to 2016, Acting Vice-Provost (Research) between 2015 and 2016, and Associate Provost (Academic Planning) from 2016 to 2022.

== Research ==
Alford’s research has focused on functional materials, particularly low microwave dielectric loss oxides. His work contributed to understanding the factors influencing dielectric loss in oxides and to the development of models describing these mechanisms.

At Imperial Chemical Industries he worked on high-temperature superconductors, developing processes for producing low surface resistance thick films of YBa2Cu3O7, which were later commercialised by Illinois Superconductor Corporation.

Alford’s later work led to a series of discoveries in solid-state masers. In 2012 his group demonstrated the first room-temperature, Earth’s field maser using an organic crystal, followed by a miniaturised version in 2015, and the first continuous-wave masing in diamond with nitrogen-vacancy centres in 2018.

== Honours and awards ==
- 1997 – Fellow of the Institute of Materials, Minerals and Mining
- 2007 – Fellow of the Royal Academy of Engineering
- 2008 – A. A. Griffith Medal and Prize, Institute of Materials, Minerals and Mining
- 2010 – Fellow of the Royal Society of Chemistry
- 2011 – Fellow of the American Ceramic Society
- 2013 – Appointed Member of the Order of the British Empire (MBE) for services to engineering
- 2016 – Armourers and Brasiers' Company Prize
- 2018 – Platinum Medal of the Institute of Materials, Minerals and Mining
- 2023 – Institute of Physics Michael Faraday Medal and Prize
- 2023 – Imperial College Medal
- 2025 – Elected Fellow of the Royal Society (FRS)

== Selected publications ==
- Alford, N. M.; Penn, S. J. (1996). "Sintered alumina with low dielectric loss". Journal of Applied Physics, 80, 5895–5898.
- Penn, S. J.; Alford, N. McN.; Templeton, A.; Wang, X.; Xu, M.; Reece, M.; Schrapel, K. (1997). "Effect of porosity and grain size on the microwave dielectric properties of sintered alumina". Journal of the American Ceramic Society, 80 (7), 1885–1888.
- Templeton, A.; Wang, X.; Penn, S. J.; Webb, S. J.; Cohen, L. F.; Alford, N. McN. (2000). "Microwave dielectric loss of titanium oxide". Journal of the American Ceramic Society, 83 (1), 95–100.
- Breeze, J. D.; Perkins, J. M.; McComb, D. W.; Alford, N. M. (2009). "Do grain boundaries affect microwave dielectric loss in oxides?" Journal of the American Ceramic Society, 92, 671–674.
- Breeze, J.; Oxborrow, M.; Alford, N. McN. (2011). "Better than Bragg: Optimizing the quality factor of resonators with aperiodic dielectric reflectors". Applied Physics Letters, 99 (11), 113515.
- Oxborrow, M.; Breeze, J.; Alford, N. McN. (2012). "Room temperature solid-state maser". Nature, 488, 353–356.
- Breeze, J. D.; Salvadori, E.; Sathian, J.; Alford, N. McN.; Kay, C. (2018). "Continuous-wave room-temperature diamond maser". Nature, 555, 493–496.
- Wen, Y.; Diggle, P. L.; Alford, N. McN.; Arroo, D. M. (2023). "Exploring the spin dynamics of a room-temperature diamond maser using an extended rate equation model". Journal of Applied Physics, 134, 194501.
