= List of fellows of the Royal Society elected in 1973 =

List of fellows of the Royal Society elected in 1973.

== Fellows ==
1. Percival Allen
2. Brigitte Alice Askonas
3. Francis Thomas Bacon
4. Alan Baker
5. Neil Bartlett
6. Sir William John Granville Beynon
7. John Gatenby Bolton
8. Sir David Roxbee Cox
9. Leslie Crombie
10. Harry Elliot
11. Douglas Scott Falconer
12. Geoffrey Alan Gilbert
13. Harish-Chandra
14. Sir Richard John Harrison
15. Harold Horace Hopkins
16. Anthony Kelly
17. Egon Hynek Kodicek
18. Jack Lewis, Baron Lewis of Newnham
19. Mary Frances Lyon
20. Peter Bryan Conrad Matthews
21. George Francis Mitchell
22. Hélio Gelli Pereira
23. Paul Emanuel Polani
24. John G. Ramsay
25. Lionel Edward Aston Rowson
26. Monkombu Sambasivan Swaminathan
27. Jamshed Rustom Tata
28. David Warren Turner
29. William Frank Vinen
30. Paul Egerton Weatherley
31. Ronald Whittam
32. Alec David Young

== Foreign members ==
1. John Bardeen
2. Manfred Eigen
3. Ulf Svante von Euler
4. Francois Jacob

== Statute 12 Fellow ==
1. Quintin Hogg, Baron Hailsham of St Marylebone
