= George Bacon (physicist) =

George Edward Bacon MA ScD (Cantab.) PhD (London) FInstP (born Derby, England, 5 December 1917 – 18 March 2011) was a British nuclear physicist, specializing in neutron diffraction.

== Biography ==
The son of George H. Bacon and Lilian A. Bacon, of Derby, he was educated at Derby School and Emmanuel College, Cambridge (Scholar). In 1945, he married Enid Trigg (who died in 2003), and they had a son and a daughter.

== Career ==
Bacon built the first neutron diffractometer in the UK at the Atomic Energy Research Establishment, Harwell, and then made the first experiments outside the United States in neutron diffraction, a means of studying the basic structures and dynamics of materials. He wrote scientific papers, textbooks and review articles on the use of neutron scattering. His work included a study of the neutron intensities diffracted by crystals, which led to studies of the basic structure of molecules and of magnetism. His book Neutron Diffraction was a standard text, beginning with the first edition in 1955.

- 1939–1946: Scientific Officer, Telecommunications Research Establishment of the Air Ministry
- 1946–1963: Deputy Chief Scientific Officer, Atomic Energy Research Establishment, Harwell
- 1963–1981: Professor of Physics at the University of Sheffield
- 1969–1971: Dean of the Faculty of Pure Science, University of Sheffield
- 1981–2011: Emeritus professor of the University of Sheffield

== Honours ==
- 1988: Leverhulme Emeritus Fellow
- 1999: Guthrie Medal and Prize and Fellow of the Institute of Physics
- 1998: Honorary degree of Doctor of Science, Sheffield

== Major publications ==
- Neutron Diffraction (1955)
- Applications of Neutron Diffraction in Chemistry (1963)
- X-ray and Neutron Diffraction (1966)
- Neutron Physics (1969)
- Neutron Scattering in Chemistry (1977)
- The Architecture of Solids (1981)
- Fifty Years of Neutron Diffraction (1987)
- Many scientific publications on X-ray and neutron crystallographic studies in Proceedings of the Royal Society, etc.
