= John Enderby =

British physicist (1931–2021)

Sir John Enderby
- Born: John Edwin Enderby; 16 January 1931
- Died: 3 August 2021 (aged 90)
- Education: University of London (BSc, PhD)
- Spouse: Lady Susan Enderby
- Children: 4
- Awards: Knight Bachelor (2004); FRS (1985); CBE (1997)
- Scientific career
- Fields: Physics
- Workplaces: College of Technology, Huddersfield; University of Sheffield; University of Leicester; University of Bristol
- Thesis: Some electrical properties of liquid metals (1963)
- Doctoral students: Alan Soper

Sir John Edwin Enderby CBE FRS FInstP (16 January 1931 – 3 August 2021) was a British physicist, and was Professor of Physics at University of Bristol from 1976 to 1996. He developed innovative ways of using neutrons to study matter at the microscopic level. His research has particularly advanced our understanding of the structure of multicomponent liquids— those made up of two or more types of atoms – including commonly used liquid alloys and glasses.

== Education ==
Enderby was educated at Chester Grammar School and the University of London where he was awarded Bachelor of Science and Doctor of Philosophy degrees.

== Career and research ==
Enderby’s techniques mean that the relative positions of the various types of atomic nuclei can be deduced from diffraction patterns arising from the quantum wavelike scattering of the neutrons. His work includes the surprise discovery that aqueous solutions — important in biology as the environment for an organism’s chemical reactions — have a quasi-lattice structure.

He was the H.O. Wills Professor of Physics and Head of Department, from 1981 to 1994 and Deputy Director (Directeur-adjoint) of the Institut Laue–Langevin from 1985 to 1988.

== Personal life ==
Enderby died on 3 August 2021, at the age of 90.

== Awards and honours ==
Enderby was awarded the Guthrie Medal of the Institute of Physics, an institution he later served as President. Enderby was elected a Fellow of the Royal Society (FRS) in 1985 and was Physical Secretary and Vice-President of the society from 1999 to 2004 and was Chair of the Royal Society's Publishing Board ex officio. He was President of the Institute of Physics from 2004 to 2006. Enderby's contributions have been recognised by the award of a CBE in 1997 and a Knighthood for services to Science and Technology in 2004.
