= Michael F. Ashby =

British metallurgical engineer

The Honourable Michael Ashby CBE FRS FREng
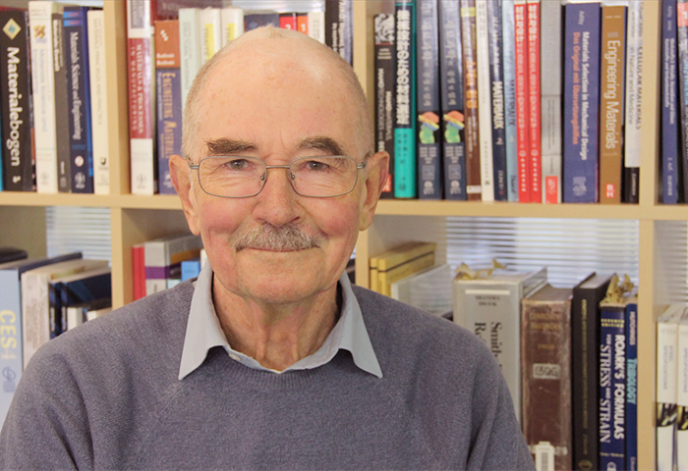
- Michael F. Ashby in 2017
- Born: Michael Farries Ashby; 20 November 1935 (age 90)
- Education: Campbell College; University of Cambridge (BA, MA, PhD)
- Awards: A. A. Griffith Medal and Prize (1981); Armourers and Brasiers' Company Prize (1986); Eringen Medal (1999)
- Scientific career
- Fields: Materials science
- Thesis: The metallography and mechanical properties of internally oxidised copper alloys (1961)
- Doctoral students: Lorna Gibson
- Website: www-edc.eng.cam.ac.uk/mfa2

Michael Farries Ashby (born 20 November 1935) is a British metallurgical engineer and materials scientist. He served as Royal Society Research Professor, and a Principal Investigator at the Engineering Design Centre at the University of Cambridge.

Ashby is known for his contributions to the field of Materials Science, particularly in the development of systematic methods for material selection in product design and applied engineering. His work spans the broader field of materials, processing, and design in science and engineering. Ashby is recognised for his significant role in both research and education in the field, having authored several award-winning textbooks and pioneering teaching approaches aimed at making complex materials concepts accessible to engineering students.

In later years, his research has increasingly focused on materials in relation to environmental impact and sustainability, as well as on the development of computer-based tools to support materials selection in science and engineering practices.

== Education ==
Ashby is the son of the leading botanist and educator Lord Eric Ashby. He was educated at Campbell College in Belfast and the University of Cambridge where he studied the Natural Sciences Tripos as a student of Queens' College, Cambridge. He received his Bachelor of Arts degree in Metallurgy in 1957 (First Class Honours); his Master of Arts degree in 1959 and his PhD in 1961.

His former doctoral students include Lorna Gibson.

== Career and research ==
By conducting numerous studies on the active deformation mechanisms under different temperature conditions, M.F. Ashby developed a graphical approach for determining these mechanisms. He generalises this approach to the broader field of material selection by developing the software CMS (Cambridge Materials Selector) in collaboration with David Cebon, with whom he co-founded Granta Design Limited. He also collaborated extensively with Yves Bréchet (CNRS Silver Medal). He continued to work on the software to improve its pedagogical value across Materials Education (CES EduPack – used at more than 1000 universities worldwide) and value to industry (CES Selector). This software is currently available from the company Granta Design, of which he is the chairman.

Ashby has revolutionised the approach to the selection of materials to take into account four aspects: feature, material, geometry, and processes; moreover, he worked with the division in classes and subclasses. In doing so he has developed a comprehensive approach that associates to the expected mechanical functions of an object a performance index that has to be optimised. These indices allow to better take into account all the properties required of a material, such as specific stiffness (ratio between the elastic modulus and density) instead of single elastic module. His approach allows one to rationally choose the most suitable materials for each application.

In practice, this approach firstly asks to identify the performance index starting from the expected function and geometry. Then it is possible to select thresholds for certain properties in order to select the most useful materials from those present in a database that has some 80,000 materials. The division into classes allows pre-selecting representative materials and therefore working only with certain classes of materials. Finally, the selected materials are shown in a 2-dimensional chart, called the Ashby diagram, in order to view those with the highest performance index. These diagrams often contain also nanostructured materials and composites.

His works on materials are comparable to those of Carrega and Colombié.

=== Publications ===
- Ashby, M.F. – 'Materials and Sustainable Development'. Butterworth-Heinemann, 2015 (2nd Edition 2024). ISBN 9780081001769
- Ashby, M.F. – 'Materials and the Environment: Eco-informed Material Choice'. Butterworth-Heinemann, 2009 (2nd Edition 2012). ISBN 9780123859716
- Ashby, M.F., Shercliff, Hugh and Cebon, David – 'Materials: Engineering, Science, Processing, and Design'. Elsevier, Butterworth-Heinemann, 2007 (3rd Edition 2013). ISBN 978-0-08-097773-7
- Ashby, Mike and Johnson, Kara – 'Materials and Design: The Art and Science of Materials Selection in Product Design'. Butterworth-Heinemann, Oxford, 2002. ISBN 0-7506-5554-2
- Ashby, M.F. – 'How to Write a Paper'. 7th Edition 2011
- Ashby, M.F. – 'Materials Selection and Process in Mechanical Design'. Butterworth-Heinemann, Oxford, 1999. ISBN 0-7506-4357-9
- Ashby, M.F. and Cebon, D. – 'Case studies in Materials Selection'. First Edition, Granta Design Ltd, Cambridge, 1996. ISBN 9780750636049
- Ashby, M.F. and Gibson, L.J. – 'Cellular Solids Structure and Properties'. Cambridge University Press, Cambridge, 1997. ISBN 0-521-49911-9
- Asbhy, M.F. and Jones, D.R.H. – 'Engineering Materials 1, Second Edition'. Butterworth-Heinemann, Oxford, 1996. ISBN 978-0080966656
- Ashby, M.F. and Jones, D.R.H. – 'Engineering Materials 2, Second Edition'. Butterworth-Heinemann, Oxford, 1998. ISBN 9780080545653
- Ashby, M.F. and Waterman, N.A. – 'The Chapman and Hall Material Selector'. Chapman and Hall, London, Volumes 1–3, 1996. ISBN 978-0-203-73641-8
- Ashby, M.F. and Frost H.J. – 'Deformation-mechanism maps: the plasticity and creep of metals and ceramics'. Pergamon, 1982. ISBN 9780080293387
- Ashby, M.F. – 'Materials Selection in Mechanical Design'. Pergamon Press, 1992 (2nd edition 1999; 3rd edition 2005; 4th edition 2010). ISBN 978-1-85617-663-7

=== Honours and awards ===
Ashby's awards and honours include:

- elected a Fellow of the Royal Society (FRS) in 1979
- received the A. A. Griffith Medal and Prize in 1981
- elected a member of the National Academy of Engineering in 1990 for outstanding contributions to the understanding of mechanical behaviour of materials and for development of formats useful for design
- awarded the European Materials Medal of the Federation of European Materials Societies (FEMS) in 1993
- elected a Fellow of the Royal Academy of Engineering (FREng) in 1993
- appointed CBE in the 1997 Birthday Honours
- nominated a Foreign Honorary Member of the American Academy of Arts and Sciences in 1993
- awarded the Eringen Medal in 1999

He has been honoured by the American Society of Engineering Education (ASEE) by having a teaching prize named after him.
