= Giles Davies =

- Education: University of Bristol; University of Cambridge
- Known for: Terahertz science and engineering
- Awards: Wolfson Research Merit Award (2011); FInstP (2012); Michael Faraday Medal and Prize (2014); FREng (2016); FLSW (2026)
- Scientific career
- Workplaces: University of Cambridge; University of New South Wales; University of Leeds
- Thesis: Fractional quantum Hall effect in high-mobility two-dimensional hole gases in tilted magnetic fields (1991)
- Website: eps.leeds.ac.uk/electronic-engineering/staff/298/professor-giles-davies-freng

Alexander Giles Davies CPhys CEng FInstP FLSW FREng is Professor of Electronic and Photonic Engineering at the University of Leeds.

== Education ==
Davies was educated at the University of Bristol where he was awarded a first-class Bachelor of Science degree in Chemical Physics in 1987. He obtained his PhD in Semiconductor Physics from the University of Cambridge in 1991, where he investigated the fractional quantum Hall effect under the guidance of Sir Michael Pepper.

== Research ==
Davies is known for his work on terahertz-frequency electronics and photonics. His early work focused on photoconductive techniques for the generation and coherent detection of pulsed terahertz radiation, which helped demonstrate the unique capabilities of terahertz imaging and spectroscopy compared with established analytical methods.

In 2002, Davies jointly coordinated a European consortium that demonstrated the long-sought terahertz frequency quantum cascade laser (QCL), an intra-band solid-state device. He was appointed to his chair at the University of Leeds in the same year.

== Awards and honours ==
Davies was awarded a Royal Society Wolfson Research Merit Award in 2011. In 2014, he was awarded the Institute of Physics Michael Faraday Medal and Prize alongside Professor Edmund Linfield for their “outstanding and sustained contributions to the physics and technology of the far-infrared (terahertz) frequency region of the electromagnetic spectrum”. In 2016, Davies was elected Fellow of the Royal Academy of Engineering, and in 2026 he was elected Fellow of the Learned Society of Wales.
