= James Derek Birchall =

James Derek Birchall FRS OBE
- Born: 7 October 1930; Leigh, Lancashire, England
- Died: 7 December 1995 (aged 65); London, England
- Education: Wigan and Leigh College
- Known for: Research on health effects of alumina and silica exposure
- Spouse: Pauline Jones (m. 1956–1990)
- Children: Two sons
- Awards: Armourers and Brasiers' Company Prize (1993; jointly with J.E. Evetts)
- Scientific career
- Fields: Inorganic chemistry Materials science
- Institutions: Imperial Chemical Industries
- Doctoral students: Christopher Exley

James Derek Birchall FRS OBE (7 October 1930 – 7 December 1995) was an English inorganic chemist, materials scientist, and inventor who spent most of his career working for Imperial Chemical Industries. He is known for his research on the health effects of exposure to silica and alumina.

== Biography ==
James Derek Birchall (usually known as Derek) was born in Leigh, the son of David Birchall, who managed a butcher's shop, and Valetta (née Marsh), who died in childbirth, aged 25. David Birchall remarried four years later, to Dora Mary Leather. In the meantime, Derek had been brought up by his grandparents.

Birchall left primary school, aged 14, and joined an industrial firm in his area, Sutcliffe Speakman as a general laboratory assistant. He was promoted to assistant in the research laboratory, and worked on activated carbon and flame. From an internal company report in 1947 it was evident that Birchall had done a lot of experimental work “with great care and precision”.

After a period of time with John Kerr & Co, and doing his National Service in the army, Birchall joined ICI Salt Division in 1957, as assistant technical officer. Much of his early work there was on the nucleation of sodium chloride solutions and the improved formation of dendritic crystals. He was then transferred to ICI Cassel Works to apply his expertise to help commission a sodium cyanide plant, and increase the size of the crystals produced.

After the formation of the Mond Division in 1964, and further promotion, Birchall had his own team and could return to his first love: the extinction of fire. It resulted in the invention and commercialising of Monnex, a dry powder extinguisher still in use today. He later worked on new composite materials, and on silica and its hydrates. There then followed a period of outside appointments:

- 1976–1985 Visiting Professor in Materials Science, University of Surrey
- 1977–1979 Visiting Fellow of Wolfson College, Oxford
- 1984–1986 Visiting Professor at MIT
- 1985 Professorial Associate of Brunel University
- 1986–1988 Visiting Professor of Biochemistry, University of Surrey
- 1988-ca 1991 Visiting Professor at Durham University

In 1992, Birchall took up the post of Professor of Inorganic Chemistry at the University of Keele, where he became interested in the role of silicon in biology.

=== Awards and honours ===
He was named a Fellow of the Royal Society in 1982, making him one of very few individuals without a university degree to be so named. He was named an Officer of the Order of the British Empire in 1990, and (with J.E. Evetts) was jointly awarded the Armourers and Brasiers' Company Prize in 1993.

=== Family ===
Birchall married Pauline Mary Jones at Sheffield register office on 2 June 1956. They had two sons, Shaun and Timothy.

James Derek Birchall died in a traffic accident. He was “struck by a vehicle on a pedestrian crossing in London on 30 November 1995. After several days on a life-support machine he died without regaining consciousness on 7 December.” He was buried at St John the Evangelist's Church, Norley, alongside his wife, who had died five years earlier.
