= Spherical neutron polarimetry =

Form of neutron polarimetry

Spherical neutron polarimetry (SNP) is a form of neutron polarimetry that measures the polarization of neutrons both before and after scattering. It uses controlled magnetic fields to manipulate the spin of the neutrons, which are then separated by the Meissner effect, allowing polarization to be measured.
