= Steven Armes =

Professor of Polymer Chemistry and Colloid Chemistry at the University of Sheffield

Steve Armes FRS
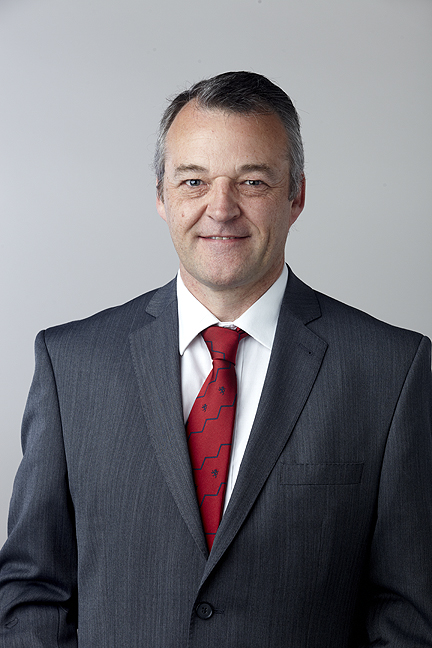
- Steve Armes at the Royal Society admissions day in 2014
- Born: Steven Peter Armes; 1962 (age 63–64)
- Education: Whitley Abbey Comprehensive School; University of Bristol (BSc, PhD)
- Awards: Tilden Prize
- Scientific career
- Workplaces: Los Alamos National Laboratory; University of Sussex; University of Sheffield
- Thesis: Colloidal forms of conducting polymers (1987)
- Doctoral advisor: Brian Vincent
- Website: sites.google.com/sheffield.ac.uk/armesgroup; sheffield.ac.uk/chemistry/staff/profiles/steve_armes

Steven Peter Armes (born 1962) FRS is a Professor of polymer chemistry and colloid chemistry at the University of Sheffield.

== Education ==
Armes was educated at Whitley Abbey Comprehensive School in Coventry and the University of Bristol where he was awarded a Bachelor of Science degree in 1983 followed by a PhD in 1987 for research supervised by Brian Vincent.

== Career and research ==
After a postdoctoral research at Los Alamos National Laboratory Armes became a lecturer at the University of Sussex in 1989 where he worked until 2004. He moved to Sheffield to become Professor of Polymer and Colloid Chemistry in 2004. As of 2016, he is a director of Farapack Polymers Limited, a corporate spin-off from the University of Sheffield. Armes group does research on polymer chemistry and colloid chemistry. Using polymerisation techniques such as reversible addition−fragmentation chain-transfer polymerization (RAFT) and atom-transfer radical-polymerization (ATRP) his laboratory synthesises a wide range of polymers.

His research focuses on the synthesis and application of polymers – long-chain molecules formed from many repeating units known as monomers. In particular, Steven's research group has developed new ways to make water-soluble or water-dispersible polymers based on methacrylic monomers.

A powerful approach is to use polymerization-induced self-assembly (PISA). For example, a water-insoluble polymer can be grown from one end of a water-soluble polymer in aqueous solution. The growing hydrophobic chain leads to in situ self-assembly, forming copolymer nanoparticles of tuneable size and shape. These nanoparticles have a wide range of potential applications, including as a long-term storage medium for stem cells, viscosity modifiers, novel microcapsules and nanoparticle lubricants.

His other research interests include designing novel biocompatible copolymer gels and vesicles and developing microscopic nanocomposite particles, which have applications in paints and anti-reflective coatings. Steven also has a fruitful collaboration with space scientists based in the United Kingdom, Germany, and the United States, for whom he designs synthetic mimics to aid our understanding the behaviour of micrometeorites travelling at hypervelocities in outer space. Armes has developed robust new synthetic routes to controlled-structure water-soluble polymers. He optimised the living radical polymerisation of hydrophilic methacrylates, discovered a new class of 'schizophrenic' diblock copolymers whose amphiphilicity can be switched on or off, and has designed a range of novel biocompatible block copolymer gels and vesicles. His work on water-borne polymer colloids has led to novel shell cross-linked micelles and nanocomposite particles, with applications in paints, anti-reflective coatings and as stimulus-responsive Pickering emulsifiers.

=== Awards and honours ===
Armes was elected a Fellow of the Royal Society (FRS) in 2014. More recently, he has pioneered polymerisation-induced self-assembly to produce a range of bespoke spherical, worm-like and vesicular nano-objects via RAFT dispersion polymerisation. In 2013, Armes was awarded the Tilden Prize by the Royal Society of Chemistry.
