= John Kilner =

John F. Kilner
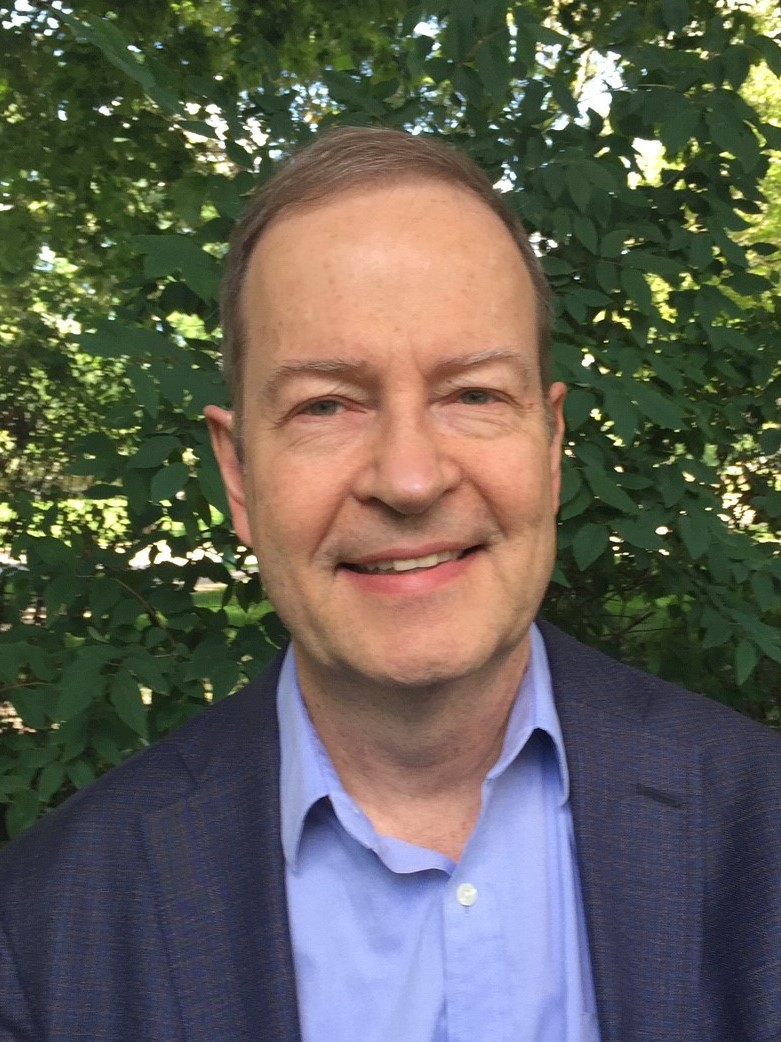
- John F. Kilner – August 2019
- Born: August 12, 1952 (age 74)
- Occupation: Professor
- Years active: Late 20th and early 21st centuries
- Title: Professor Emeritus of Bioethics and Contemporary Culture, Trinity International University
- Spouse: Suzanne Miiller Kilner

Academic background
- Education: Harvard University (PhD, AM), Gordon-Conwell Theological Seminary (MDiv), Yale University (BA)

Academic work
- Discipline: theological ethics
- Sub-discipline: bioethics
- Notable works: Dignity and Destiny: Humanity in the Image of God; Why the Church Needs Bioethics: A Guide to Wise Engagement with Life's Challenges

John F. Kilner (born August 12, 1952) is a bioethicist who held the Franklin and Dorothy Forman endowed chair in ethics and theology at Trinity International University, where he was also Professor of Bioethics and Contemporary Culture and Director of Bioethics Degree Programs. He is a Senior Fellow at The Center for Bioethics & Human Dignity (CBHD) in Deerfield, Illinois, where he served as founding director until Fall 2005. According to Princeton University Professor Robert George, he is "one of the leading bioethicists of the modern period."

== Biography and education ==
At the end of high school, Kilner won the Illinois State Debate Championship and the United States National Debate Championship with his partner Robert Biederman, representing New Trier East High School in Winnetka, Illinois.

Kilner received the Bachelor of Arts degree in English literature from Yale University. He then earned the Master of Divinity degree from Gordon-Conwell Theological Seminary, and Master of Arts and Doctor of Philosophy degrees from Harvard University.

== Academic work ==
From 1983 to 1990 he was professor of social ethics at Asbury Theological Seminary in the Lexington, Kentucky area, and taught medical ethics at the University of Kentucky. Following three years as Senior Associate at the Park Ridge Center for the Study of Health, Faith, and Ethics in Chicago, in 1993 he became founding director of the Bannockburn Institute for Christianity and Contemporary Culture and its Center for Bioethics and Human Dignity, in Bannockburn, Illinois. He also received a teaching post at nearby Trinity Evangelical Divinity School.

In 1996 he was promoted at Trinity to full professor, and in 1999 was awarded its Franklin and Dorothy Forman endowed chair in ethics and theology. In 2005 he became its Director of Bioethics Programs, providing academic direction for Masters-level degree initiatives in North America, Asia, and Africa. Upon retirement from Trinity, he was named Professor Emeritus of Bioethics and Contemporary Culture there. Trinity marked Kilner's retirement by launching the annual John Kilner Lectureship in Bioethics and the Kilner Student Mentorship Fund at the Center for Bioethics & Human Dignity.

== Awards ==
Kilner received an Educator of the Year Award from the national Christian Medical and Dental Associations; the international Paul Ramsey Award for Exemplary Achievement in the Field of Bioethics from the Center for Bioethics & Culture Network; and a Book of the Year award from Christianity Today for Dignity and Destiny. In his honor, Trinity International University established the "John F. Kilner Lectures in Bioethics" in March, 2019; and The Center for Bioethics & Human Dignity established the "Kilner Student Mentorship Fund" in July, 2019.

== Research ==
Kilner's first project was interviews with government and missionary health care workers as well as with traditional healers among the Akamba people in Kenya, to gain cross-cultural insight into how decisions are made regarding who receives access to limited health care resources. The study investigated the effect of exposure to Western values (through the educational system) on what people consider to be ethical approaches to resource allocation. It was published in the Hastings Center Report in 1972, with further analysis in the 1990 Yale University Press book Who Lives? Who Dies? and the 1992 Eerdmans book Life on the Line.

In 1988, he conducted a questionnaire study involving medical directors of kidney dialysis and kidney transplantation facilities in the United States. Directors identified the weight that each of 16 different patient selection criteria receive in selecting patients for treatment (e.g., medical benefit, social value, age). They also indicated how that weight would increase or decrease were medical resources to become somewhat more limited in supply. That study was originally published in the American Journal of Public Health, with further analysis in the book Who Lives? Who Dies?

Later, as Director of the Center for Bioethics and Human Dignity, Kilner oversaw the development of a research project on ethical and religious perspectives on emerging biotechnologies. The project involved scholars with different relevant areas of expertise.The project and its findings are discussed in the Georgetown University Press book Biotechnology and the Human Good.

Upon moving to his position as Director of Bioethics Programs for Trinity International University, Kilner obtained a grant from the Wabash Center for Teaching and Learning (Indiana) for a research project on “The Pedagogical Challenges of Engaging Bioethical Issues across the Theological Curriculum.” He assembled a team of faculty from each departments at Trinity Evangelical Divinity School to study bioethical challenges and to develop teaching strategies for how their departments could prepare students.

Next, he received a foundation grant to work with Mayo Clinic's William Cheshire and Zion Clinic's John Dunlop on a second phase, in which Trinity faculty developed case studies illustrating how bioethical challenges arise in people's lives. These faculty then led a study process involving the other faculty in their departments to identify ways that their academic disciplines could help individuals and churches understand and engage these challenges. This research resulted in the Zondervan book Why the Church Needs Bioethics.

Kilner's most recent research project was a seven-year investigation of why people matter—specifically, what it means for people to be created and renewed in the image of God. The research included documenting the ways that the image-of-God concept has been used for liberation and for devastation, depending on how the concept has been understood. The project analyzed over 1100 published discussions of the image of God, along with the passages in the Bible where this concept is employed. This research has resulted in Kilner's book on the image of God, Dignity and Destiny, released by Eerdmans in 2015. In it, Kilner argues that the image of God has not been damaged by sin because Jesus Christ is the image of God and people have been created according to—and need to be restored to—Christ's image.

Kilner then assembled the team of Gilbert Meilaender from Valparaiso University (and member of the U.S. President's Council on Bioethics), Amy Laura Hall from Duke University, Scott Rae from Biola University, David Gushee from Mercer University, Russell DiSilvestro from California State University, and Patrick Smith from Duke University. The team's purpose was to compare a biblical account of why people matter with contemporary secular accounts. The result was Kilner's edited book, Why People Matter, released by Baker Academic in 2017.

== Publications ==
=== Books ===
==== Single-authored books ====
- Kilner, John F. Dignity and Destiny: Humanity in the Image of God. Eerdmans, 2015.
  - Reviews: Reviews in Religion & Theology 24 (1), 133–135; and Touchstone 29 (6), 46–48.
- Kilner, John F. Life on the Line (Ethics, Aging, Ending Patients' Lives, and Allocating Vital Resources). Eerdmans, 1992.
  - Reviews: Medical Humanities Review 7 (2), 13–16; and Religious Studies Review 20 (4), 314.
- Kilner, John F. Who Lives? Who Dies? (Ethical Criteria in Patient Selection). Yale University Press, 1990 (paperback edition, 1992).
  - Reviews: The New York Review of Books 39 (5), 32–37; and American Journal of Public Health 80 (7), 883.

==== Books co-authored ====
- Kilner, John F., co-authored. Alternative medicine. Kregel, 1998.
- Kilner, John F., co-authored. End of Life Decisions. Kregel, 1998.
- Kilner, John F., co-authored. Sexuality and Reproductive Technology. Kregel, 1998.
- Kilner, John F., coauthored. Suicide and Euthanasia. Kregel, 1998.
- Kilner, John F., co-authored. Does God Need Our Help? (Cloning, Assisted Suicide, and Other Challenges in Bioethics). Tyndale, 2003.
- Kilner, John F., co-authored. Healthcare Ethics. Kregel, 2004.
- Kilner, John F., co-authored. Genetics, Stem Cell Research, and Cloning. Kregel, 2004.
- Kilner, John F., co-authored. Biotechnology and the Human Good. Georgetown U. Press, 2007
  - Reviews: Studia Bioethica 1 (1), 71; and Heythrop Journal 53 (5), 874–875.

==== Books edited or co-edited ====
- Kilner, John F., ed. Why People Matter. Baker Academic, 2017.
  - Reviews: Journal of the Society of Christian Ethics 38 (1), 190–192; and Themelios 43 (2), 319–321.
- Kilner, John F., co-edited. Cutting-Edge Bioethics (Biotechnology). Eerdmans, 2002.
  - Reviews: Health Progress 85 (4), 62–63; and Issues in Law & Medicine 18 (2), 206–207.
- Kilner, John F., co-edited. Medical Ethics. Bridge Intl., 1999.
- Kilner, John F., co-edited. The Reproduction Revolution. Eerdmans, 2000.
  - Reviews: Reformed Review 54 (2), 141–142; and Bibliotheca Sacra 158 (631), 376–377.
- Kilner, John F., co-edited. Genetic Ethics. Eerdmans and Paternoster, 1997.
  - Reviews: Perspectives on Science and Christian Faith 50 (4), 298–299; and Didaskalia 10 (1), 94–95.
- Kilner, John F., co-edited. Dignity and Dying. Eerdmans and Paternoster, 1996.
  - Reviews: Christian Scholar's Review 27 (Spr.), 359–361; and Didaskalia 9 (2), 96–98.
- Kilner, John F., co-edited. Bioethics and the Future of Medicine. Eerdmans and Paternoster, 1995.
  - Reviews: The Reformed Theological Review 55 (3), 152–153; and Calvin Theological Journal 32 (2), 529–531.
- Kilner, John F., co-edited. The Changing Face of Health Care. Eerdmans and Paternoster, 1998.
  - Reviews: Medicine, Health Care and Philosophy 2 (2), 211–212; and Journal of Medical Ethics 26 (2), 149–150.
- Kilner, John F., co-edited. Bioethics: Opportunity or Obstacle for the Gospel? LCWE, 2005.
- Kilner, John F., ed. Why the Church Needs Bioethics. Zondervan, 2011.
  - Reviews: Ethics & Medicine 32 (1), 62–63; and Covenant Quarterly 71 (1–2), 90–91.

=== Other multi-author books ===
Under Kilner's direction, the Center for Bioethics and Human Dignity began work on developing a series of books called the Horizons in Bioethics Series, which Eerdmans Publishing Company has published in the United States and Paternoster Press has published in Europe. Each book focuses on one topical area within bioethics. For each volume, Kilner, in consultation with others, assembled a team of authors. Kilner himself served as the lead editor and often one of the authors of most of those books, including such titles as Bioethics and the Future of Medicine, Dignity and Dying, Genetic Ethics, The Changing Face of Health Care, The Reproduction Revolution, and Cutting-Edge Bioethics (on biotechnology). A similar volume co-edited by Kilner and cardiologist Jay Hollman outside this series is entitled Medical Ethics. It has been published only in the Russian language. For other books, Kilner has been a member of the author team and written a portion of the book—for example, Choosing Who's to Live, Christian Higher Education, and Created in the Image of God.

=== Non-academic books ===
- Kilner, John F., and C. Ben Mitchell (2003). Does God Need Our Help? Cloning, Assisted Suicide, & Other Challenges in Bioethics. Wheaton, Illinois: Tyndale.
- BioBasics series of six Q/A books published by Kregel Publications. Kilner wrote each of the BioBasics books with 4–6 other authors. The titles/topics of these books include End of Life Decisions; Reproductive Technology; Suicide and Euthanasia; Alternative medicine; Healthcare; and Genetics, Stem Cell Research, and Cloning. Reviewed and discussed in Bevington, Linda K., Ray G. Bohlin, Gary P. Stewart, John F. Kilner, and C. Christopher Hook (2004). Genetics, Stem Cell Research, and Cloning. Grand Rapids, Michigan: Kregel.

=== Peer-reviewed journal articles ===
He has also written articles appearing in such publications as the Hastings Center Report; Journal of Health Politics, Policy and Law; American Journal of Public Health; American Journal of Jurisprudence; Interpretation; Healthcare Executive; Journal of International Biotechnology Law; Mayo Clinic Proceedings; Archives of Internal Medicine; American Journal of Kidney Diseases; Ethics & Medicine; Hospital Practice; Journal of Religious Ethics; Christianity Today; Moody Monthly, and Christian Scholars Review.

=== Encyclopedia articles ===
He was selected to write the sections on human dignity, on macroallocation of healthcare resources, and on microallocation of healthcare resources for the Encyclopedia of Bioethics (published by Macmillan); and the section addressing the issue of stem cell research for The Blackwell Companion to Science and Christianity.
