= David Shoenberg =

British physicist (1911–2004)

David Shoenberg MBE FRS
- Born: 4 January 1911; St. Petersburg, Russia
- Died: 10 March 2004 (aged 93); Cambridge, England
- Citizenship: United Kingdom
- Education: Trinity College, Cambridge
- Known for: Shoenberg effect
- Spouse: Catherine Félicité Fischmann
- Scientific career
- Thesis: The magnetic properties of bismuth (1936)
- Doctoral advisor: Pyotr Kapitza
- Doctoral students: John K. Hulm; Joe Vinen

David Shoenberg (4 January 1911 – 10 March 2004) was a British physicist who worked in condensed matter physics. Shoenberg is known for having developed experimental and theoretical principles to study the De Haas–Van Alphen effect to characterize the electrical conduction of metals.

== Biography ==
David Shoenberg was the fourth of five children of Sir Isaac Shoenberg, engineer and pioneer of radio and television, and Esther (née Aisenstein). He was born in St. Petersburg, but came to England with the family when he was three. He attended Latymer Upper School, from where he won a scholarship to Trinity College, Cambridge and went up in October 1929. He had intended to study mathematics, but after one year he switched to physics, gaining a First in 1932. This ensured that he could continue as a research student, working on low-temperature physics in the newly-built Mond Laboratory, and supervised by Peter Kapitza, FRS.

In August 1934 Kapitza went to a conference in Moscow, and to visit his parents, but was not permitted to leave. He left Shoenberg more or less on his own. When the half-built helium liquefier was finished, Shoenberg chose the two topics which lasted him to the end of his active life, superconductivity and the De Haas-Van Alphen effect (dHvA).

Back in Moscow a new Laboratory had been built for Kapitza, to which Shoenberg was invited in 1937. He spent a year there, continuing work on, and making considerable advances in the understanding of dHvA.

During the World War II Shoenberg worked on mine-detection and delayed-action fuses (for which he was appointed MBE in 1944).

For most of his career Schoenberg made the dHvA effect into a powerful tool for understanding the behaviour of conduction electrons in metals. A tribute to Shoenberg’s work and contributions was published by V M Pudalov of the Lebedev Physical Institute in 2011.

=== Family ===
In Cambridge, in March 1940, David Shoenberg married Catherine (Kate) Félicité Fischmann, who was some five years older. Her ancestry was Russian but she was born a Belgian, and had taken British nationality before her marriage. She was a physiology graduate of University College London and worked in Cambridge on tissue culture, at the Strangeways Research Laboratory and elsewhere. The Shoenbergs had two daughters, Ann and Jane, and a son Peter.

Kate died in Cambridge in 2003, age 97. David died in Addenbrooke's Hospital on 10 March 2004, following a stroke, and was cremated in Cambridge on the 18th .

== Appointments and awards ==
- 1944 MBE
- 1944-1952 University Lecturer in Physics, Cambridge University
- 1947-1973 Head of the Royal Society Mond Laboratory
- 1947-1973 Corporate Official Fellow, Gonville and Caius College, Cambridge
- 1952-1973 Reader in Physics
- 1953 FRS
- 1964 Fritz London Memorial Prize
- 1973-1978 Professor of Physics (Emeritus)
- 1973-1978 Head of the Low Temperature Physics Group, Cavendish Laboratory
- 1973-2004 Life Fellow
- 1982 International Honorary Member of the American Academy of Arts & Sciences
- 1995 Hughes Medal
