= History of University College London =

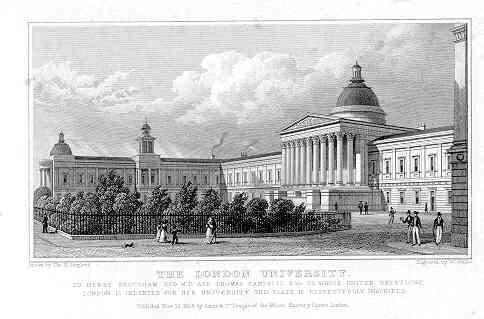
University College's main building in the late 1820s, with its classical portico and dome

University College London (UCL) was founded on 11 February 1826, under the name London University, as a secular alternative to the strictly religious universities of Oxford and Cambridge. It was founded with the intention from the beginning of it being a university, not a college or institute. However its founders encountered strong opposition from the Church of England, the existing universities and the medical schools which prevented them from securing the Royal Charter under the title of "university" that would grant "London University" official recognition and allow it to award degrees. It was not until 1836, when the latter-day University of London was established, that it was legally recognised (as a college, under the name of University College, London) and granted the authority to submit students for the degree examinations of the University of London.

In 1900 when the University of London was reconstituted as a federal university, UCL became one of the founding colleges. Through much of the 20th century it surrendered its legal independence to become fully owned by the University of London. It was rechartered as an independent college in 1977, has received government funding directly since 1993, and gained the power to award degrees in its own right in 2005. From 2005, the Institute has branded itself as UCL (rather than University College London) and has used the strapline "London's Global University".

UCL over the years
Years	Name	Status
1826–1836	London University	Joint stock company (unincorporated)
1836–1869	University College, London	College with proprietors, incorporated by Royal Charter
1869–1907	University College, London	College incorporated by Act of Parliament
1907–1977	University of London, University College	Part of the University of London
1977–2005	University College London	College incorporated by Royal Charter
2005–2023	UCL	College incorporated by Royal Charter
2023–present	UCL	University incorporated by Royal Charter

== Early years ==
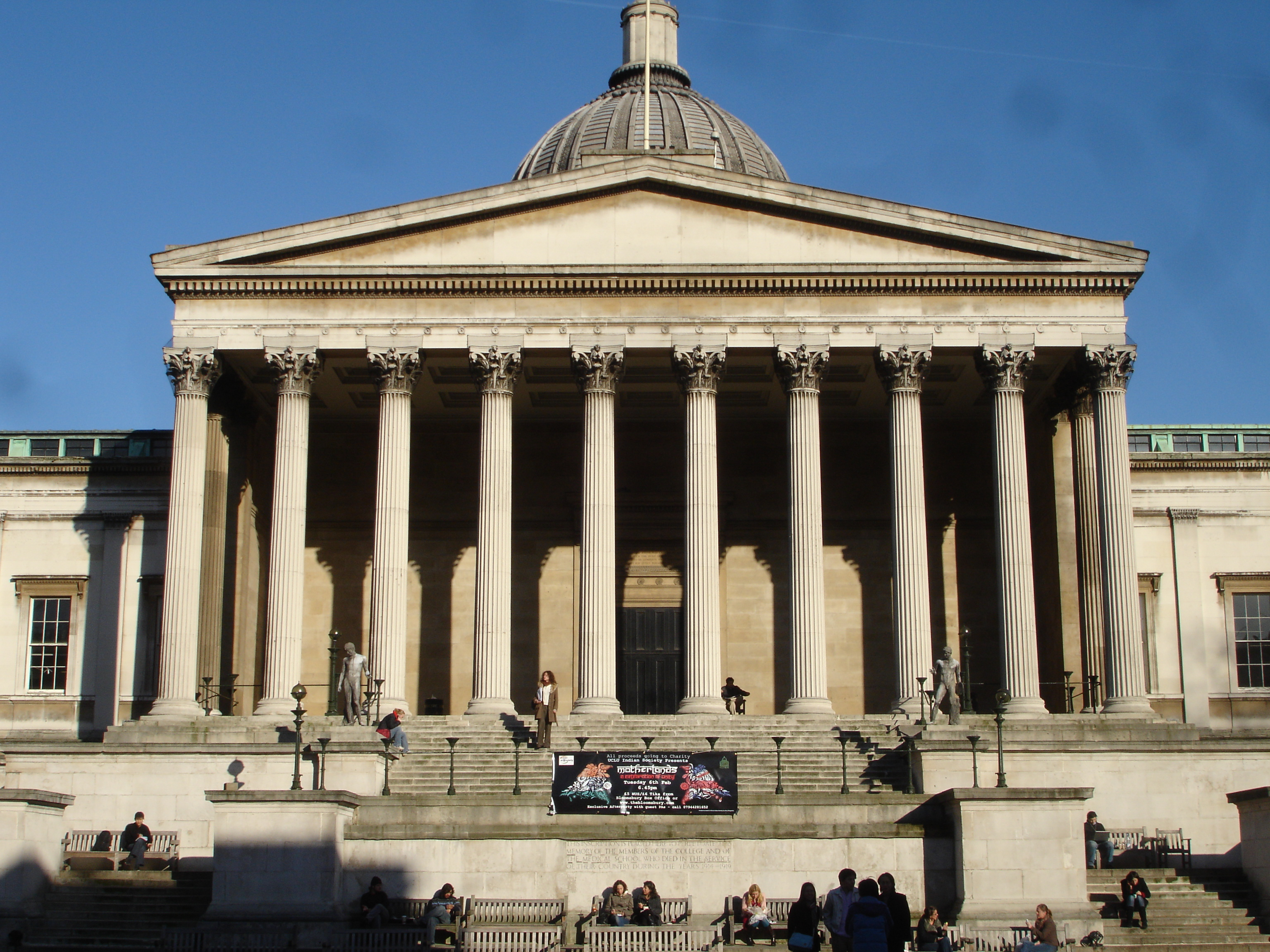
The UCL Main Building, just off Gower Street is the centre of the UCL campus

=== Priority ===
UCL's foundation date of 1826 makes it the third oldest university institution in England, and it was certainly founded with the intention of it being England's third university, but whether or not UCL is actually the third oldest university in England is questionable: UCL makes this claim on its website, but so do the Universities of London (1836) and Durham (1832). Other higher education institutions in England have institutional ancestry preceding their formation as "universities": for example what is now the University of Nottingham can trace some elements back to 1798 but only began university-level teaching with the foundation of the first civic college in 1881 (royal charter as University College Nottingham in 1903), and did not gain University status (via a new royal charter) until 1948. Conversely, King's College London (KCL) was founded after UCL, but received its Royal Charter (granting it legal existence as a corporation) in 1829, before UCL, so arguably is older, leading King's College students to claim the title of third oldest university in England for their institute.

In more recent publications, the claim was instead made that UCL was "the first university to be founded in London", avoiding explicit conflict with Durham's claim although maintaining the argument with KCL and the University of London. This claim still implied that UCL should be considered a university from 1826, and thus could be considered an implicit claim to be the third oldest university in England. It has, however, been dropped from the prospectus for 2019 entry although it appears on the UCL website.

The situation is further confounded by the fact that (unlike London and Durham) neither UCL nor KCL were de jure universities in their own right, but constituent colleges of the University of London, and were thus not named as universities in 19th-century references. UCL and KCL became universities in their own right in 2023. It is a fact, however, that UCL was an early member of a rapid expansion of university institutions in the UK in the 19th century.

=== Foundation ===
The proposal for foundation of what became UCL arose from an open letter, published in The Times in February 1825, from the poet Thomas Campbell to the MP and follower of Jeremy Bentham, Henry Brougham. Campbell had visited the university at Bonn in today's Germany, which (unlike Oxbridge at that time) allowed religious toleration. Brougham was a supporter of spreading education and a founder (in 1826) of the Society for the Diffusion of Useful Knowledge. Isaac Lyon Goldsmid, a leader of London's Jewish community, convinced Brougham and Campbell to work together on the proposed 'London University'. They were supported by representatives of a number of religious, philosophical and political groups, including Roman Catholics, Baptists, Utilitarians, and abolitionists. Others represented included James Mill and the Congregationalist benefactor Thomas Wilson. A 1923 mural in the UCL Main Library depicts as "The Four Founders of UCL" Bentham, Brougham, Campbell and Henry Crabb Robinson (although Bentham, while an inspiration to the other three, was not directly involved in the College's founding).

The College formally came into existence as a Joint Stock Company on 11 February 1826 as 'The University of London', and was unique in Great Britain in being completely secular; in fact no minister of religion was allowed to sit on the College Council. Thomas Arnold was to refer to it as "that Godless institution in Gower Street".

The Council appointed in 1827 as Warden Leonard Horner, the founder of what is now Heriot-Watt University, but after internal disagreements he left in 1831 and the post was abolished. During this period the College founded University College School, originally called the London University School (1830). In 1833 the foundation stone was laid for the hospital which had always been planned in association with the College, then known as the 'North London Hospital', but today University College Hospital.

The University College was founded based on practices at the University of Edinburgh and other Scottish universities. "The strongest, single, intellectual influence was that of Edinburgh, and, from the example of the Scottish Universities, London drew many of its most distinctive features. The extended range of the subjects of university study, the lecture system, the non-residence of students, their admission to single courses, the absence of religious tests, the dependence of the professors upon fees and the democratic character of the institutions, were all deliberate imitations of Scottish practice"

The Council sought to arrange a formal incorporation of the institution under the name of the 'University of London' via a royal charter, which would have officially granted them the title of "university" and thus degree awarding powers. (Note: "It was considered that conferring on the new institution the title of University would Invest it with the privileges of granting degrees, as incidental to that title" (emphasis in original)) This was first applied for in 1830, under the Whig government of Earl Grey, with Brougham as Lord Chancellor, another London University council member, Sir Thomas Denman as Attorney General (until his appointment as Lord Chief Justice of England in 1832) and two former councillors Lord Lansdowne (1826 - 1830) and Lord John Russell (1826 - 1828) in the cabinet as Lord President of the Council and Paymaster of the Forces respectively.

In February 1831 it was reported that "a charter, which now only awaits the royal signature, is to be granted to the University of London". But before it could be signed, the University of Cambridge voted to petition the king against granting any charter allowing degrees to be awarded "designated by the same titles, or granting the same privileges, as the degrees now conferred by the Universities of Oxford and Cambridge".

The attempt to win a charter as a University in 1831 was successfully blocked by Oxford and Cambridge. The application was renewed in 1833, but found formidable opposition in Parliament, from the Church of England, from Oxford and Cambridge again, and from the medical profession. Opposition also came from abroad; Count Metternich instructed his ambassador to Britain in 1825 to "tell His Majesty of my absolute conviction that the implementation of this plan would bring about England's ruin". Thomas Babington Macaulay however predicted "that it is destined to a long, a glorious and a beneficent existence".

In April and May 1834, the renewed application for a charter was discussed by the Privy Council, with petitions against the application being heard from Oxford and Cambridge, the Royal College of Physicians, and the medical schools in London. The hearings were inconclusive and no recommendation was made before the Whig government, by then led by Lord Melbourne after Grey's retirement, fell in November 1834.

In March 1835, another London University council member, William Tooke, proposed an address in the House of Commons praying the King to grant a charter to London University allowing it to grant degrees in all faculties except theology. This was carried 246 - 136 despite the opposition of the government. The response was that the Privy Council would be called upon to report on the matter. Then the Tory government fell and Melbourne returned as Prime Minister.

Russell and Lansdowne returned to government with Melbourne, Russell being promoted to Home Secretary. But Brougham was out, with Melbourne telling Russell, "it can never be safe to place him … in an important executive or administrative office". On 30 July, in response to a question from Tooke, the Attorney General Sir John Campbell announced that two charters would be granted, one to the (then) London University (i.e. UCL) "not as a University but as a College", with "no power … of granting academical degrees", the second "for the purpose of establishing a Metropolitan University" - what was to become the University of London. This was condemned as a "barren collegiate charter" by Tooke, who called on the London University (UCL) "to consider whether, His Majesty in his most gracious answer to the Address of the House of Commons recognised by name, and in explicit terms, the University of London, it is not by this royal and official sanction of its style as a University, entitled, without further pageantry or form, to confer all manner of degrees except in Theology and Medicine" (emphasis in original).

On 2 December 1835, a meeting of the proprietors discussed the government plan. Brougham explained that while "it went a little to his heart … to sink into a college when they had originally started as an university" this would be worth it for the benefits the new University of London would bring them. On one point, however, he objected to the plan – the names of the degrees were to be A.B., A.M., etc., differentiating them (as requested by Cambridge's 1831 petition) from the ancient universities. He said that "for his own part he would rather accept it [the government's plan], coupled as it is with these objections, than reject it altogether", although he thought the Council should "exert themselves to the utmost" to get the government to agree to the new university granting the same degrees as Oxford and Cambridge. Tooke proposed the resolution: "That although the tenor of his Majesty's gracious answer to the address of the House of Commons, for a charter to enable the London University to grant degrees in all faculties except theology or divinity, was not fully realized, yet, as the government had proposed a comprehensive and efficient plan, this meeting agrees to the same, resting with confidence on the board of examiners to be appointed by government." After some discussion, this was amended to: "That his Majesty's Ministers having, in consequence of the gracious answer returned from the throne to the address of the House of Commons, devised a more efficient and comprehensive plan than was contemplated for giving academical honours in all the faculties, except divinity, this meeting is satisfied that this institution has nothing to fear from competition, and cordially and gratefully accepts the said plan, and recommends it to the adoption of the Council." The amended resolution was passed unanimously.

The government did, in the event, alter the name of the degrees to be granted by the University of London, and the charter of incorporation under the name of University College, London was issued on 28 November 1836, with the charter establishing the University of London being issued later on the same day.

After the Council had recommended acceptance of the charter, a Special General Meeting of the proprietors was called on 28 January 1837. Despite concerns being raised about the possible impact of the Act of Uniformity on the college, the proprietors voted unanimously to accept the charter.

=== Development ===
In December 1837 the sub-committee drawing up the regulations for examinations in classics at the University of London passed a resolution (10 to 9) in favour of requiring candidates for the BA to pass an examination on one of the gospels or the Acts of the Apostles on Greek, as well as on scripture history. The University referred this decision to the home secretary, Lord John Russell, to determine whether this would be legal.

Russell was also petitioned by a United Committee representing three dissenting denominations and by the Council of UCL. The dissidents pointed out that introducing an examination on the Bible was "an indirect violation of the liberal principle on which the University of London was founded", the Council agreed, adding that the proprietors of UCL had been "induced to surrender any claim which they might be supposed to have acquired to a charter of incorporation as a University … on the clear understanding that the University this proposed to be substituted was to be grounded on the same principles as the institution which had given rise to it".

These led to a request from Russell to Lord Burlington (Chancellor of the University of London) on 18 December "to bring again under the consideration of the Senate the proposed rule". This was opposed, however, by a letter to the Senate of the University (via Burlington) from the Principal (Hugh James Rose) and the professors of Mathematics, Classical Literature, and English Literature and Modern History at King's College London. They claimed that as encouragement of a "regular and liberal course of education" was one of the objectives of the University, as laid out in its charter, it could not positively exclude the study of the Bible, which they regarded as an essential part of education.

In the end, victory went, as with the dispute over the names of London degrees, to the UCL party. The University of London Senate voted "almost unanimously" in February 1838 to make examinations on the Bible optional. The incident did, however, serve to emphasise the lack of connection between the colleges and the University, with the Morning Chronicle noting that: "The possibility of so nugatory a proceeding would have been obiviated had the University College been allowed some participation in the Acts of the University."

On 7 May 1842, the proprietors annulled the regulations of the original Deed of Settlement and put in place new bylaws, including a provision for shares to be forfeited or ceded back to the College who would distribute them to honours graduates from the University of London who had studied at the College, thus admitting some alumni to the membership and management of the College. These alumni members were termed "Fellows of the College".

In 1869 an even greater constitutional change took place. The University College (London) Act was passed, with the effect of "divesting [the College] of the character of a proprietary body of shareholders, and … its reconstitution for public objects". Fears had arisen that the proprietors retained the right to dissolve the College and divide its assets. There were also doubts as to whether the 1842 bylaws were legal. A meeting of proprietors unanimously approved the bill on 24 February 1869, and it became law on 24 June 1869. The act revoked the Royal Charter of 1836 and reincorporated the College (still under the name of "University College, London"); the members of the College being defined as the former proprietors, who became "governors" unless they had previously been fellows in which case they remained "fellows", and the registered donors, who became "life governors".

=== The Campaign for a Teaching University for London ===
The new charter awarded to the University of London in 1858 broke the exclusive connection between the University and the affiliated schools and colleges. The change was strongly objected to by UCL, with the proprietors passing motions saying "That this meeting … understanding that the Senate [of the University of London] proposes that collegiate education shall no longer be necessary for candidates for degrees in arts and laws, desires to express is disapproval of the proposed change, as one likely to be injurious to the cause of regular and systematic education, and as not only lowering the value, but altering the very meaning, of an English University degree" and "That University College having been pointed out in 1835 by the address of the House of Commons to the Crown, as the future University of London and having chiefly waived its claims to that high dignity in order to promote the public welfare, has peculiar right to object to a change which will destroy the essential character of that university constitution on the faith of which it consented to surrender its position". George Grote objected to the resolutions, noting their similarity to the objections raised against allowing dissenters to take degrees. Despite the objections of UCL (and other colleges), the new charter was passed.

In the latter half of the 19th century, the tensions between the colleges and the University of London led to a campaign for a Teaching University for London. It was first proposed in 1864 that teaching should be added to the University of London, but this was rejected by the University Senate. It was proposed again in 1878 and again rejected. After the formation of the Victoria University in 1880, with a federal link between teaching (initially only in Owens College) and examining in the University, the University of London Convocation (which had been formed from the graduates by the 1858 charter) voted in favour of a similar move for London in 1881 and 1882. These were again defeated in the Senate.

In 1884 the Association for Promotion of a Teaching University for London was publicly launched by UCL, King's, and the London medical schools. However, Convocation was persuaded that a teaching university would lead to a reduction in degree standards and voted against a teaching University in 1885.

It was felt that with the creation of the Victoria University, Owens College had, despite being smaller and younger than UCL, achieved what UCL had been unable to do – gain degree-awarding powers. considering applying to become a college of the Victoria University, UCL joined forces with King's and the medical schools to propose the formation of a separate federal university in London, to be called the Albert University. The Royal College of Physicians and the Royal College of Surgeons, meanwhile, petitioned that they be granted degree awarding powers in Medicine and Surgery. Faced with these various options, a Royal commission was established in 1888 to look into the matter.

The commission reported in 1889, rejecting the petition of the Royal Colleges and recommending reform of the University of London, with a minority report favouring the granting of the charter to the Albert University. It was agreed that if reform of the existing University failed, the new University should be established.

A complicated scheme for reform of the University was drawn up in 1891 but was rejected by Convocation, leading to a renewal of the petition of UCL and King's to form the Albert University. This was approved by the Privy Council later in 1891 and was (in accordance with an 1871 law) laid in the Houses of Parliament for comment, with the name now changed to the Gresham University with the joining of Gresham College to the scheme.

The charter for the Gresham University was opposed by the Victoria University, by the Senate and Convocation of the University of London, by the provincial medical schools, and by other colleges in London that were not part of the scheme. In response to this, the government set up a second Royal Commission in 1892.

The new commission recommended reform of the University of London rather than establishment of a new body, and that this be carried out by Act of Parliament rather than by Royal Charter. This was accepted by Convocation in 1895 and a bill to put it into effect had past its first reading when the government fell. A second bill was introduced in the House of Lords, but did not pass the Commons. A third bill was introduced in the Lords in February 1898 and finally passed both houses, despite a number of blocking amendments, receiving Royal Assent on 12 August.

The University of London was reformed under the University of London Act 1898 to become a federal teaching university for London while retaining its position as an examining body for colleges outside of the capital. UCL became a school of the University "in all faculties".

=== Jeremy Bentham and UCL ===
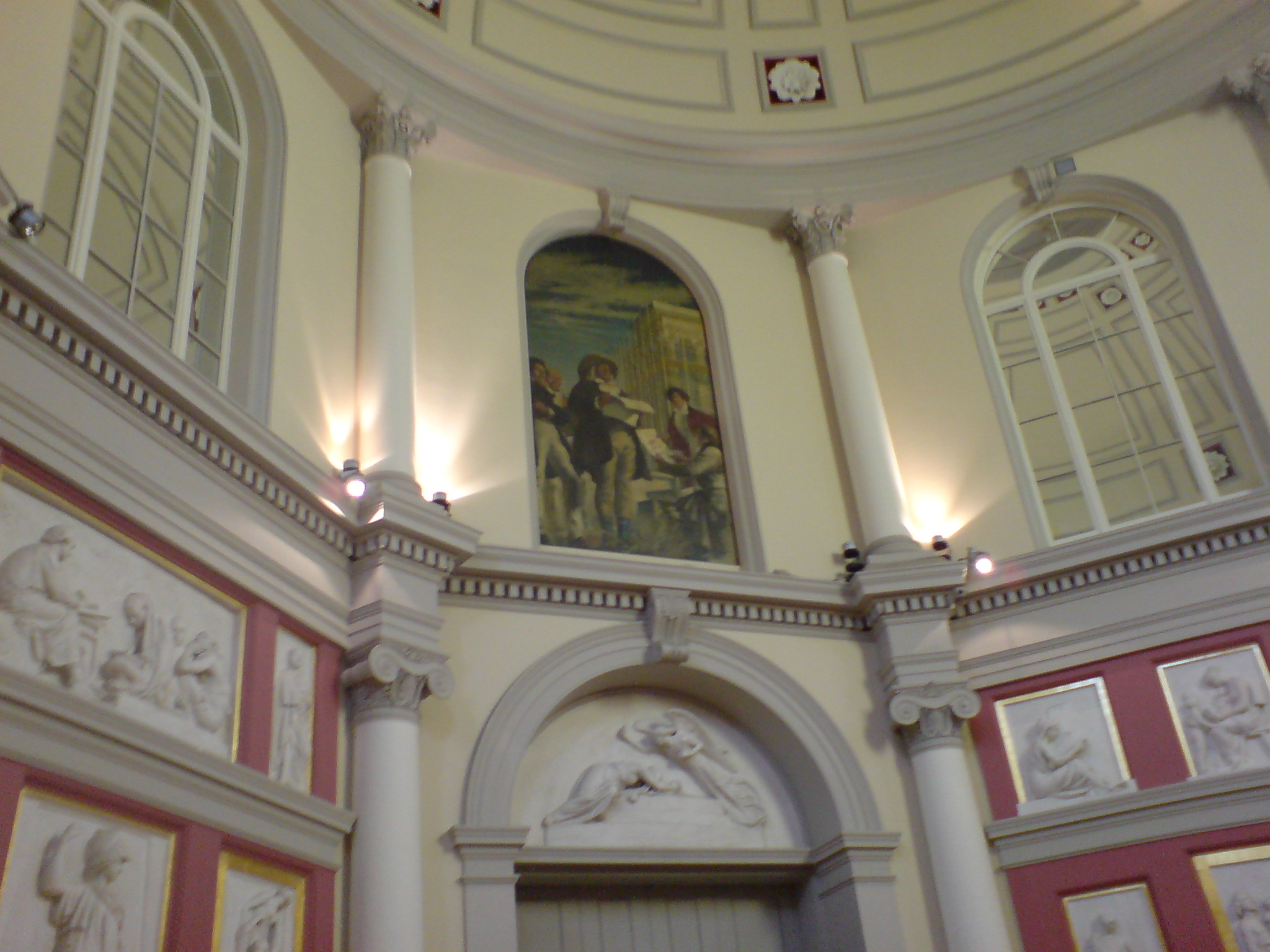
A fictional painting of Jeremy Bentham overseeing the construction of UCL in the Flaxman gallery inside the 'main library'

The philosopher and jurist Jeremy Bentham (1748–1832), advocate of Utilitarianism, is often credited with being one of the founders of the original 'University of London'. This is not the case, although the myth of his direct participation has been perpetuated in a mural by Henry Tonks, in the dome above the Flaxman gallery (named after artist John Flaxman in the UCL Main Building). This shows William Wilkins, the architect of the main building, submitting the plans to Bentham for his approval while the portico is under construction in the background. The scene is however apocryphal. Bentham was eighty years of age when the new University opened its doors in 1828, and took no formal part in the direct campaign to bring it into being.

Although Bentham played no direct part in the establishment of UCL, he can still be considered as its spiritual father. Many of the founders held him in high esteem, and their project embodied many of his ideas on education and society. Jeremy Bentham was a strong advocate for making higher education more widely available, and is often linked with the University's early adoption of a policy of making all courses available to people regardless of sex, religion or political beliefs. When the College's Upper Refectory was refurbished in 2003, it was renamed the Jeremy Bentham Room (sometimes abbreviated JBR) in tribute.

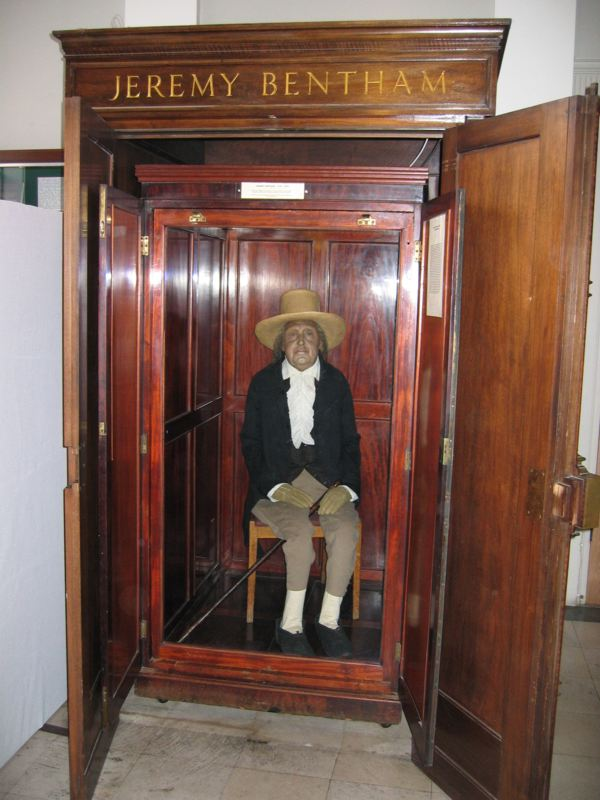
The Jeremy Bentham auto-icon, on display in the cloisters of the UCL Main Building

Bentham's body is on public display at UCL in the Student Centre. Prior to moving to this location in 2020, his body had been on display at the end of the South Cloisters of the UCL Main Building; he had directed in his will that he wanted his body to be preserved as a lasting memorial to the university. This 'Auto-Icon' has become famous. Unfortunately, when it came to his head, the preservation process went disastrously wrong and left it badly disfigured. A wax head was made to replace it; the actual head is now kept in the college vaults. (Note: It is often claimed that King's College London students stole the head and played football with it. Although the head was indeed stolen, the football story is a myth. Other myths associated with Bentham and the College include that the box containing his remains is wheeled into senior college meetings, and that he is then listed in minutes as "present but not voting"; or that he has a vote on the College council, but only when the vote is split, and that he always votes in favour of the motion.)

=== Construction of the Main Building ===
In 1827, a year after the founding of UCL, construction of the Main Building began on the site of the proposed Carmarthen Square (at the time wasteland, used occasionally for duelling or dumping). Eight acres of ground were purchased for £30,000 by Goldsmid, John Smith and Benjamin Shaw. The Octagon Building is a term used for the whole of the Main Building, but more appropriately for a central part of it. At the centerpiece of the building is an ornate dome, which is visible throughout the immediate area. The Octagon was designed by the Architect William Wilkins, who also designed the National Gallery. The original plans by Wilkins called for a U-shaped enclosure around the Quad (square). These plans however were stymied for want of funding, and work on the main building was not completed until the 20th century, (after the building itself had suffered damage during World War II). The Main Building was finally finished in 1985, 158 years after the foundations were laid, with a formal opening ceremony by Queen Elizabeth II.

=== Milestones ===
UCL claims to be the first higher education institution in England to accept students of any race, class or religion, although there are records of at least one mixed-race student from Jamaica entering Oxford in 1799. More recent publications have revised the claim to drop the mention of race.

UCL also claims to have been the first to accept women on equal terms with men, in 1878. However, the University of Bristol also makes this claim, University College Bristol having admitted women from its foundation in 1876. The College of Physical Sciences in Newcastle, a predecessor institution of Newcastle University, also admitted women from its foundation, in 1871. At UCL, women were only admitted to Arts, Law and Science in 1878 and remained barred from Engineering and Medicine. Women were first allowed to enter the medical school in 1917, and admissions remained restricted until much later. Men and women had separate staff common rooms until 1969, when Brian Woledge (then Fielden professor of French) and David Colquhoun (then a young lecturer) got a motion passed to end segregation.

UCL was a pioneer in teaching many topics at university level, establishing the first British professorships in, amongst other subjects, chemistry (1828), English (1828, Rev. Thomas Dale), German (1828, Ludwig von Mühlenfels), Italian (1828, Sir Antonio Panizzi), geography (1833), French (1834, P. F. Merlet), zoology (1874, Sir Ray Lankester), Egyptology (1892), and electrical engineering (1885, Sir Ambrose Fleming). UCL also claims to have offered the first systematic teaching in Engineering, Law and Medicine at an English university, although its Engineering course, established in 1841, followed the establishment of engineering courses at Durham (1838) and King's College London (1839).

The Slade School of Fine Art was founded at the College in 1871 following a bequest from Felix Slade.

UCL claims to be the first University institution in England to establish a students' union, in 1893. However, this postdates the formation of the Liverpool Guild of Students in 1892. Men and women had separate unions until 1945.

== 20th century ==
In 1900 the University of London was reconstituted as a federal university with new statutes drawn up under the University of London Act 1898. UCL, along with a number of other colleges in London, became schools of the University of London. While most of the constituent institutions retained their autonomy, UCL was merged into the University in 1907 under the University College London (Transfer) Act 1905 (5 Edw. 7. c. xci) and lost its legal independence. (KCL also surrendered its independence a few years later, in 1910.) This necessitated the separation of University College Hospital and University College School as separate institutions (which they remain). A new charter in 1977 re-incorporated UCL and restored its independence, although it remained a college of the University of London and was not able to award degrees in its own right until 2005.

Further pioneering professorships established in the 20th century included phonetics (1921, Daniel Jones), Ramsay professor of chemical engineering (1923, E. C. Williams), psychology (1928, Charles Spearman), and papyrology (1950, Sir Eric Gardner Turner).

In 1906, Sir Gregory Foster, who had been Secretary of the College, was appointed to the new post of Provost of UCL, which he occupied until 1929.

In 1973, UCL became the first international link to the ARPANET, the precursor of today's internet, sending the world's first electronic mail, or e-mail, in the same year. UCL was also one of the first universities in the world to conduct space research. It is the driving force of the Mullard Space Science Laboratory, managed by UCL's Department of Space and Climate Physics.

In 1993 a shake up of the University of London meant that UCL (and other colleges) gained direct access to government funding and the right to confer University of London degrees themselves. This led to UCL being regarded as a de facto university in its own right.

=== Mergers ===
In 1986 the Institute of Archaeology became a department of UCL, and in 1999 the School of Slavonic and East European Studies also joined the College.

In 1988 UCL merged with the Institute of Laryngology & Otology, the Institute of Orthopaedics, the Institute of Urology & Nephrology and Middlesex Hospital Medical School. In 1994 the University College London Hospitals NHS Foundation Trust was established. UCL merged with the College of Speech Sciences and the Institute of Ophthalmology in 1995, the School of Podiatry in 1996 and the Institute of Neurology in 1997. In August 1998 the medical school at UCL joined with the Royal Free Hospital Medical School to create the Royal Free and University College Medical School, renamed in October 2008 to the UCL Medical School. In 1999 the Eastman Dental Institute joined the Medical School, which, resulting from the incorporation of these major postgraduate medical institutes, has made UCL one of the world's leading centres for biomedical research.

=== Galton and Eugenics ===
Although Francis Galton was never formally associated with UCL, he worked closely with Karl Pearson and Flinders Petrie both professors at the college. In 1904, UCL established the Eugenics Records Office at Galton's urging, and in 1907 this became the Eugenics Laboratory.

Galton died in 1911 and left funds to establish a Chair in National Eugenics, with Pearson named in his will as the first holder. In 1963, the Francis Galton Laboratory of National Eugenics became the Galton Laboratory of the Department of Human Genetics & Biometry, and in 1996 became part of the Department of Biology.

In recent years, Galton's legacy has been controversial. In 2014, the Provost of UCL, Michael Arthur, was asked by a student why Galton was still celebrated. Arthur replied "You’re not the first person to make that point to me; my only defence is that I inherited him". On 19 June 2020, UCL’s President & Provost Professor Michael Arthur announced the "denaming" of spaces and buildings named Francis Galton (and Karl Pearson) with immediate effect.

=== Nobel Laureates ===
19 Nobel Laureates of the 20th century were based at UCL: 1904 Chemistry: Sir William Ramsay • 1913 Literature: Rabindranath Tagore • 1915 Physics: Sir William Henry Bragg • 1921 Chemistry: Frederick Soddy • 1922 Physiology or Medicine: Archibald Vivian Hill • 1928 Physics: Owen Willans Richardson • 1929 Physiology or Medicine: Sir Frederick Gowland Hopkins • 1936 Physiology or Medicine: Sir Henry Hallett Dale • 1944 Chemistry: Otto Hahn • 1947 Chemistry: Sir Robert Robinson • 1955 Chemistry: Vincent du Vigneaud • 1959 Chemistry: Jaroslav Heyrovský • 1960 Physiology or Medicine: Peter Brian Medawar • 1962 Physiology or Medicine: Francis Harry Compton Crick • 1963 Physiology or Medicine: Andrew Fielding Huxley • 1970 Physiology or Medicine: Bernard Katz • 1970 Physiology or Medicine: Ulf Svante von Euler • 1988 Physiology or Medicine: Sir James W. Black • 1991 Physiology or Medicine: Bert Sakmann

== 21st century ==
The UCL Jill Dando Institute of Crime Science, the first university department in the world devoted specifically to reducing crime, was founded in 2001.

In October 2002, a plan to merge UCL with Imperial College London was announced by both institutions. The merger was widely seen as a de facto takeover of UCL by Imperial College and was opposed by both staff and UCL Union, the students' union. A vigorous campaign included websites run by both staff (David Colquhoun), and by students (David Conway, then a postgraduate student in the department of Hebrew and Jewish studies). The latter featured an agony uncle column by "Jeremy Bentham" to defend the College. On 18 November 2002 the merger was called off, in no small part because of revelations on those sites.

On 1 August 2003, Professor Malcolm Grant took the role of President and Provost (the chief executive of UCL), taking over from Sir Derek Roberts, who had been called out of retirement as a caretaker provost for the college, and had supported the plan for the failed merger. Shortly after Grant's inauguration, UCL began the 'Campaign for UCL' initiative, in 2004. It aimed to raise £300m from alumni and friends. This kind of explicit campaigning had traditionally been unusual for UK universities, and was similar to US university funding. UCL had a financial endowment in the top ten among UK universities at £81m, according to the Sutton Trust (2002). Grant also aimed to enhance UCL's global links, declaring UCL London's "Global University". Significant interactions with France's École Normale Supérieure, Columbia University, Caltech, New York University, University of Texas, Villanova University and universities in Osaka developed during the first few years of his tenure as provost.

The London Centre for Nanotechnology was established in 2003 as a joint venture between UCL and Imperial College London. They were later joined by King's College London in 2018.

Since 2003, when UCL professor David Latchman became master of the neighbouring Birkbeck, he had forged closer relations between these two University of London colleges, and personally maintained departments at both institutions. Joint research centres included the UCL/Birkbeck Institute for Earth and Planetary Sciences, the UCL/Birkbeck/IoE Centre for Educational Neuroscience, the UCL/Birkbeck Institute of Structural and Molecular Biology, and the Birkbeck-UCL Centre for Neuroimaging.

UCL's strengths in biomedicine were significantly augmented with the move of the National Institute for Medical Research (NIMR) from Mill Hill to UCL as preferred partner, announced in 2006. Founded in 1913 and the Medical Research Council's first and largest laboratory, its scientists had garnered five Nobel prizes. NIMR employed over 700 scientists and hd an annual budget of £27 million. Construction of the new premises, the Francis Crick Institute, commenced in 2011; King's College London and Imperial College also became partners of the Institute.

The UCL Ear Institute was established, with the support of a grant from the Wellcome Foundation, on 1 January 2005.

In 2007, teaching and research were separated in the Faculty of Life Sciences. In the process UCL's departments of Pharmacology and Physiology vanished (see Department of Pharmacology at University College London, 1905 – 2007.

UCL applied to the Privy Council for the power to award degrees in its own right. This was granted in September 2005, and the first degrees were awarded in 2008.

In 2007, the UCL Cancer Institute was opened in the newly constructed Paul O'Gorman Building. In August 2008, UCL formed UCL Partners, an academic health science centre, with Great Ormond Street Hospital for Children NHS Trust, Moorfields Eye Hospital NHS Foundation Trust, Royal Free London NHS Foundation Trust and University College London Hospitals NHS Foundation Trust. In 2008, UCL established the UCL School of Energy & Resources in Adelaide, Australia, the first campus of a British university in the country. The school was based in the historic Torrens Building in Victoria Square and its creation followed negotiations between UCL Vice Provost Michael Worton and South Australian Premier Mike Rann.

In 2009, the Yale UCL Collaborative was established between UCL, UCL Partners, Yale University, Yale School of Medicine and Yale – New Haven Hospital. It is the largest collaboration in the history of either university, and its scope has subsequently been extended to the humanities and social sciences.

In October 2013, it was announced that the Translation Studies Unit of Imperial College London would move to UCL, becoming part of the UCL School of European Languages, Culture and Society. In December 2013, it was announced that UCL and the academic publishing company Elsevier would collaborate to establish the UCL Big Data Institute. In January 2015, it was announced that UCL had been selected by the UK government as one of the five founding members of the Alan Turing Institute (together with the universities of Cambridge, Edinburgh, Oxford and Warwick), an institute to be established at the British Library to promote the development and use of advanced mathematics, computer science, algorithms and big data.

In August 2015, the Department of Management Science and Innovation was renamed as the School of Management and plans were announced to greatly expand UCL's activities in the area of business-related teaching and research. The school moved from the Bloomsbury campus to One Canada Square in Canary Wharf in 2016.

UCL established the Institute of Advanced Studies (IAS) in 2015 to promote interdisciplinary research in humanities and social sciences. The annual Orwell Prize for political writing moved to the IAS in 2016.

In June 2016, it was reported in Times Higher Education that as a result of administrative errors hundreds of students who studied at the UCL Eastman Dental Institute between 2005 and 2006 and 2013–14 had been given the wrong marks, leading to an unknown number of students being attributed with the wrong qualifications and, in some cases, being failed when they should have passed their degrees. A report by UCL's Academic Committee Review Panel noted that, according to the institute's own review findings, senior members of UCL staff had been aware of issues affecting students' results but had not taken action to address them. The Review Panel concluded that there had been an apparent lack of ownership of these matters amongst the institute's senior staff.

In December 2016, it was announced that UCL would be the hub institution for a new £250 million national dementia research institute, to be funded with £150 million from the Medical Research Council and £50 million each from Alzheimer's Research UK and the Alzheimer's Society.

In May 2017, it was reported that staff morale was at "an all time low", with 68% of members of the academic board who responded to a survey disagreeing with the statement "UCL is well managed" and 86% with "the teaching facilities are adequate for the number of students". Michael Arthur, the provost and president, linked the results to the "major change programme" at UCL. He admitted that facilities were under pressure following growth over the past decade, but said that the issues were being addressed through the development of UCL East and rental of other additional space.

In 2021 former students of the architecture school complained of racism and sexism. Following an investigation the University apologised and took action with a series of recommendations from an independently produced report. The UCL President and Provost Michael Spence formally apologised for "the culture of bullying, harassment and sexual misconduct" within the Barlett in 2022.

In March 2024, UCL launched an internal investigation after a department banned an academic from teaching a "provocative" modern slavery course involving China in order to remain "commercially viable".

=== Development of UCL East ===
In 2011, UCL announced plans for a £500 million investment in its main Bloomsbury campus over 10 years, as well as the establishment of a new 23-acre (9.3 ha) campus (UCL East) next to the Olympic Park in Stratford in the East End of London. The plans were revised in 2014 to 11 acres (4.5 ha) with up to 125,000 m^{2} (1,350,000 ft^{2}) of space on Queen Elizabeth Olympic Park. UCL East was conceived as part of plans to transform the Olympic Park into a cultural and innovation hub, where UCL would open its first school of design, a centre of experimental engineering and a museum of the future, along with a living space for students.

Master planners for the new campus were appointed in spring 2015, and it was estimated that the first university building would be completed for academic year 2019/20.

It was revealed in June 2016 that the UCL East expansion could see the university grow to 60,000 students. The proposed rate of growth was reported to be causing concern, with calls for it to be slowed down to ensure the university could meet financial stability targets.

Outline planning permission for UCL East was submitted in May 2017 by the London Legacy Development Corporation and UCL, and granted in March 2018. Construction of the first phase of buildings was then expected to begin in 2019, with the first building (Pool Street West) expected to be completed for the start of the 2021 academic year and the second building (Marshgate 1) opening in phases from September 2022. Phase 1 of the development was intended to have 50,000 m^{2} (540,000 ft^{2}) of space, and to provide space for 4,000 extra students and 260 extra academic staff, while the entire UCL East campus, when completed, was expected to have 180,000 m^{2} (1,900,000 ft^{2}) of space, 40% of the size of UCL's central London campus. The outline planning permission was for up to 190,800 m^{2} (2,054,000 ft^{2}) of space with up to 160,060 m^{2} (1,722,900 ft^{2}) of academic development and research space (including up to 16,000 m^{2} (170,000 ft^{2}) of commercial research space), up to 50,880 m^{2} (547,700 ft^{2}) of student accommodation, and up to 4,240 m^{2} (45,600 ft^{2}) of retail space. Construction of phase 2 (Pool Street East and Marshfield 2, 3 and 4) was expected to begin in 2030 and be completed by 2034, and the whole project will support 2,337 academic staff and 11,169 students. The campus will include residences for up to 1,800 students.

In June 2018, UCL revealed that the UK government would be providing £100 million of funding for UCL East as part of its £151 million contribution to the £1.1 billion redevelopment of the Olympic Park as a cultural and education district to be known as the East Bank.

It was announced in August 2018 that a £215 million contract for construction of the largest building in the UCL East development, Marshgate 1, had been awarded to Mace, with building planned to begin in 2019 and be completed by 2022.

In 2018, UCL also opened a campus within Here East, the Olympic Park's former Media Centre.

Construction work on UCL East began on 2 July 2019 with a ground breaking ceremony by the Mayor of London, Sadiq Khan, and work on Pool Street West began on 28 February 2020.

The first building at UCL East, renamed One Pool Street, was due to open in September 2022. However, supply chain challenges led to a delay in the building being handed over by the contractors, with students being relocated to other accommodation on short notice. One Pool Street was handed over to UCL in October 2022, with the first students moving into accommodation and teaching starting in November 2022.

== List of provosts ==
The following have served as the head of UCL. Between 1831 and 1900 there was no full-time head of the college, only a secretary.

Warden:

- Leonard Horner (1827–1831)

Principal:

- Carey Foster (1900–1904)
- Sir Gregory Foster (1904–1906)

Provost:

- Sir Gregory Foster (1906–1929)
- Sir Allen Mawer (1930–1942)
- David Pye (1943–1951)
- Sir Ifor Evans (1951–1966)
- Lord Annan (1966–1978)
- Sir James Lighthill (1979–1989)
- Sir Derek Roberts (1989–1999; 2002–2003)
- Sir Christopher Llewellyn Smith (1999–2002)
- Sir Malcolm Grant (2003–2013)
- Michael Arthur (2013–2021)
- Michael Spence (2021–present)

== Notes and references ==
Notes

== Sources and further reading ==
- Bates, James; Ibbetson, Carol (1994). The World of UCL Union 1893–1993. London: University College London Union. ISBN 0901807028.
- Bellot, H. Hale (1929). University College, London 1826–1926. London: University of London Press.
- Harte, N. B. (1979). The Admission of Women to University College London: a centenary lecture. London: University College, London.
- Harte, Negley; North, John (2004). The World of UCL 1828–2004 (3rd ed.). London: UCL. ISBN 1-84472-025-X.
- Harte, Negley; North, John; Brewis, Georgina (2018). The World of UCL (4th ed.). London: UCL Press. ISBN 978-1-78735-294-0.
- Taylor, David (1968). The Godless Students of Gower Street. London: University College London Union.

== See also ==
- University of London
