= Richard Glazebrook Medal and Prize =

Physics prize awarded annually by the Institute of Physics

- Awarded for: Outstanding and sustained contributions to leadership in a physics context
- Sponsored by: Institute of Physics
- Country: United Kingdom
- Rewards: Gold medal, £1,000
- First award: 1966
- Website: www.iop.org

The Richard Glazebrook Medal and Prize is awarded annually by the Institute of Physics to recognise leadership in the field of physics. It was established in 1966 and named in honour of Sir Richard T. Glazebrook, the first president of the Institute of Physics. It was originally a silver medal with a £250 prize.

The award consists of the medal, a cash prize and a certificate. In 1992, the Institute decided that the medal and prize should become one of its Premier Awards and that, from 2008, it should be one of its gold medals.

== Recipients ==
The following have received the award:

- 1966 Christopher Hinton, Baron Hinton of Bankside
- 1967 Sir Charles Sykes
- 1968 Frank Philip Bowden
- 1969 William Penney
- 1970 Sir Eric Eastwood
- 1971 Francis E. Jones
- 1972 Gordon Brims Black McIvor Sutherland
- 1973 Kurt Hoselitz
- 1974 Sir John Mason
- 1975 Walter Charles Marshall, Baron Marshall of Goring
- 1976 Sir Harold Montague Finniston
- 1977 Sir James Woodham Menter
- 1978 Sir George G. Macfarlane
- 1979 Thomas Gerald Pickavance
- 1980 Michael Crowley-Milling
- 1981 Godfrey Stafford
- 1982 John Mark Lenihan
- 1983 Alan Frank Gibson
- 1984 Peter Trier
- 1985 John Currie Gunn
- 1986 Geoffrey Manning
- 1987 Brian Hilton Flowers
- 1988 Derek H. Roberts
- 1989 Rendel Sebastian Pease
- 1990 John Theodore Houghton
- 1991 Francis Graham-Smith
- 1992 Keith Boddy
- 1993 Ian Butterworth
- 1994 Paul Randall Williams
- 1995 John Leslie Beeby
- 1996 Edgar William John Mitchell
- 1997 Alexander Donnachie
- 1998 Cyril Hilsum
- 1999 Christopher Llewellyn Smith
- 2000 Alexander Boksenberg
- 2001 Colin Edward Webb
- 2002 George Ernest Kalmus
- 2003 Terence John Quinn
- 2004 Ian M. Ward
- 2005 Peter Williams, Engineering and Technology Board, for his leadership of world-class companies such as Oxford Instruments
- 2006 Andrew D. Taylor, CCLRC Rutherford Appleton Laboratory, for his leadership as director of the ISIS facility at the Rutherford Appleton Laboratory
- 2007 Colin Carlile, Institut Laue-Langevin, Grenoble, for his contributions to neutron science, in particular through his leadership of the Institut Laue-Langevin
- 2008 William George Stirling (physicist), European Synchrotron Radiation Facility, Grenoble and University of Liverpool, for his outstanding leadership in managing and taking forward a world-leading laboratory, and for his innovative work in neutron and X-ray scattering science
- 2009 Peter L. Knight, Imperial College, for his outstanding contributions to Physics in the UK
- 2010 Peter Roberts, AWE, for his leadership in the design, physics and safety of nuclear weapons
- 2011 Richard J. Parker, Mike Howse, Philip C. Ruffles, Rolls-Royce Group, for the creation, development and expansion of the Rolls-Royce University Technology Centre (UTC) network
- 2012 Steven Cowley (Imperial College), for his leadership of the United Kingdom’s magnetic fusion programme and of Culham Laboratory
- 2013 Lyndon Rees Evans, for his leadership of the Large Hadron Collider Project
- 2014 Gerhard Materlik, for his leadership in establishing a world-leading laboratory at the Diamond Light Source
- 2015 Sir Tejinder Virdee, for his leadership of the Compact Muon Solenoid (CMS) experiment at the Large Hadron Collider (LHC)
- 2016 Hugh Montgomery, For his leadership at the Thomas Jefferson National Accelerator Facility and distinguished research in high-energy physics
- 2017 David Charlton, For his leadership in experimental work on the electroweak standard model, beginning with the study of Z-boson decays at LEP and culminating in the discovery of the Higgs boson at the LHC
- 2018 Michele Dougherty, For her scientific leadership of the Cassini magnetic field instrument at Saturn and the European Space Agency (ESA) JUICE study team, leading to mission selection to explore the environs of Jupiter.
- 2019 Anne-Christine Davis, For her outstanding support and leadership in physics, particularly for women and those from non-traditional backgrounds, for her leadership of the UK particle cosmology community, and her gender championship roles.
- 2020 John Llewellyn Collier, For the sustained leadership and strategic development of the UK's multi-disciplinary Central Laser Facility and his pioneering developments in high peak power and high-energy, high-average power lasers.
- 2021 Ian Chapman, For outstanding leadership of the UK Atomic Energy Authority and the world’s foremost fusion research and technology facility, the Joint European Torus, and the progress it has delivered in plasma physics, deuterium-tritium experiments, robotics, and new materials.
- 2022 Peter Thompson, For outstanding leadership of the National Physical Laboratory and the sustained impact of metrology on UK prosperity and quality of life.
- 2023 Belinda Wilkes, For outstanding leadership as Director of the Chandra X-ray Center, supporting the operation, exploitation and public relations of NASA's premier X-ray observatory, and significant contributions to our understanding of quasars.
- 2025 Peter Littlewood, For leading international research institutions, including Argonne National Laboratory and the Cavendish Laboratory, and especially as founding executive chair of the Faraday Institution, the UK’s independent institute for electrochemical energy storage research.

== See also ==
- Institute of Physics Awards
- List of physics awards
- List of awards named after people
