= Hugh Elliott =

Hugh Elliott or Elliot may refer to:

- Hugh Elliot (1752–1830), British diplomat and colonial governor
- Hugh Elliot (MP) (1848–1932), British politician
- Sir Hugh Elliott, 3rd Baronet (1913–1989), British conservationist & ornithologist
- Hugh Elliott (diplomat), British diplomat and UK ambassador to Spain since 2019
- Hugh Eliot (1921–1945), British flying ace of World War II

== See also ==
- Hugh Elliott Eaglesham (1873–1938), Canadian physician and politician
- Hugh E. Montgomery (born 1948), British-born US physicist
