= Lagoudakis =

Lagoudakis (Greek: Λαγουδάκης) is a Greek family name which is derived from the Greek word λαγουδάκι (lagoudáki: diminutive of λαγός (lagós)) for "bunny." The genitive case form Lagoudakou (Λαγουδάκου) is applied to female name bearers. Notable people with this name include:

- Pavlos Lagoudakis, Greek physicist
- Sokratis Lagoudakis (1861–1944), Greek long-distance runner
