= Celsius =

Unit of measurement for temperature

degree Celsius
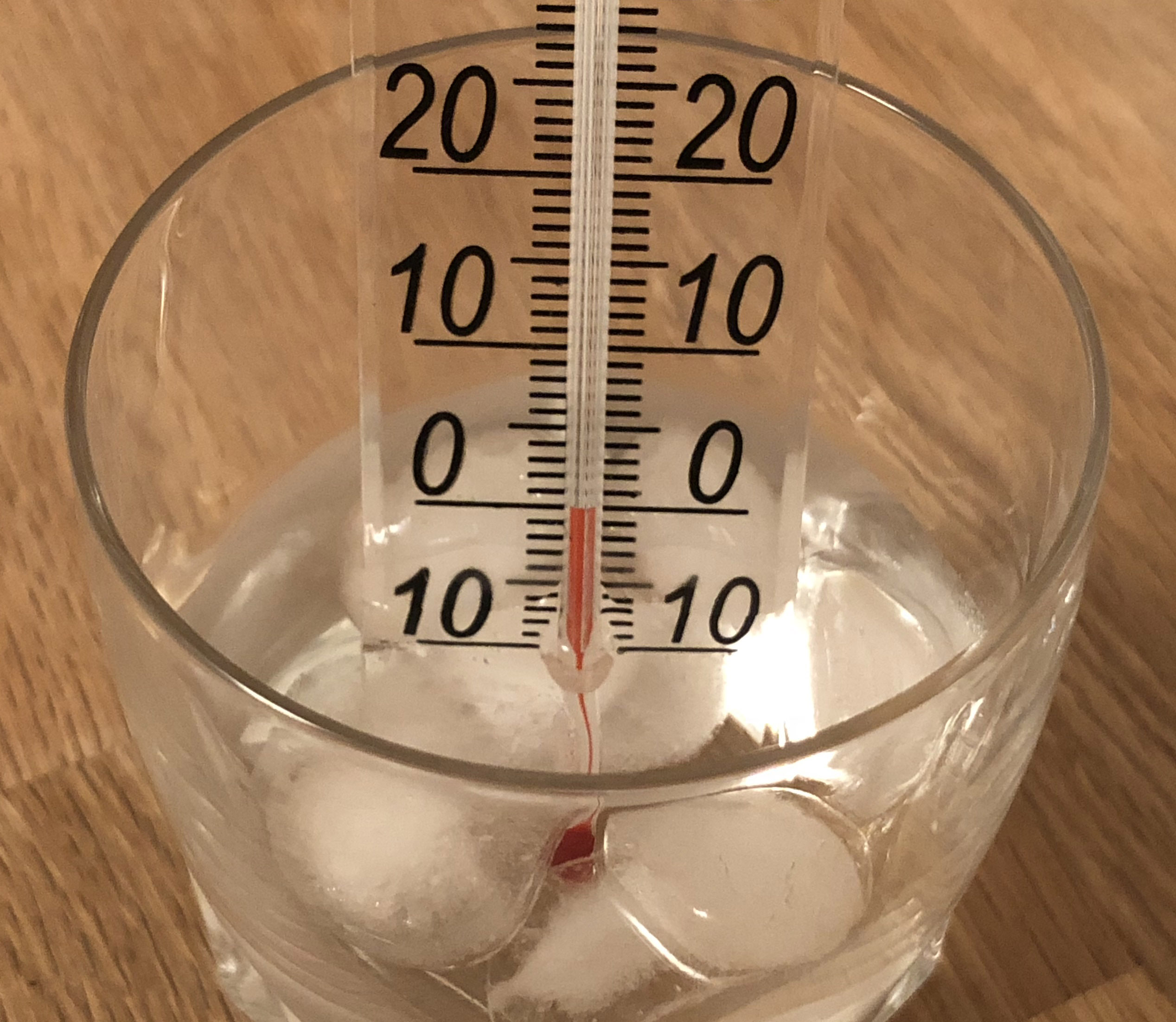
- A thermometer calibrated in degrees Celsius, showing a temperature of 0 °C in a glass of ice and water

General information
- Unit system: SI
- Unit of: temperature
- Symbol: °C
- Named after: Anders Celsius

Conversions
x °C in ...	... corresponds to ...
- Kelvin: (x + 273.15) K
- Fahrenheit: (9/5x + 32) °F

The degree Celsius is the unit of temperature on the Celsius temperature scale (originally known as the centigrade scale in English), one of two temperature scales used in the International System of Units (SI), the other being the closely related Kelvin scale. The degree Celsius (symbol: °C) can refer to a specific point on the Celsius temperature scale or to a difference or range between two temperatures. It is named after the Swedish astronomer Anders Celsius (1701–1744), who proposed the first version of it in 1742. The unit was called centigrade in several languages (from the Latin centum, which means 100, and gradus, which means steps) for many years. In 1948, the International Committee for Weights and Measures renamed it to honor Celsius and also to remove confusion with the term for one hundredth of a gradian in some languages. Most countries use this scale, with the exception of the United States and some island territories, where the Fahrenheit scale is still used.

Throughout the 19th and the first half of the 20th centuries, the scale was based on 0 °C for the freezing point of water and 100 °C for the boiling point of water at 1 atm pressure. (In Celsius's initial proposal, the values were reversed: the boiling point was 0 degrees and the freezing point was 100 degrees.)

Between 1954 and 2019, the precise definitions of the unit degree Celsius and the Celsius temperature scale used absolute zero and the temperature of the triple point of water. Since 2007, the Celsius temperature scale has been defined in terms of the kelvin, the SI base unit of thermodynamic temperature (symbol: K). Absolute zero, the lowest temperature, is now defined as being exactly 0 K and −273.15 °C.

Countries by usage Celsius (°C) Celsius (°C) and Fahrenheit (°F) Fahrenheit (°F)

== History ==
Anders Celsius's original thermometer used a reversed scale, with 100 as the freezing point and 0 as the boiling point of water.

In 1742, Swedish astronomer Anders Celsius (1701–1744) created a temperature scale that was the reverse of the scale now known as "Celsius": 0 represented the boiling point of water, while 100 represented the freezing point of water. In his paper Observations of two persistent degrees on a thermometer, he recounted his experiments showing that the melting point of ice is essentially unaffected by pressure. He also determined with remarkable precision how the boiling point of water varied as a function of atmospheric pressure. He proposed that the zero point of his temperature scale, being the boiling point, would be calibrated at the mean barometric pressure at mean sea level. This pressure is known as one standard atmosphere. The BIPM's 10th General Conference on Weights and Measures (CGPM) in 1954 defined one standard atmosphere to equal precisely 1,013,250 dynes per square centimeter (101.325 kPa).

In 1743, the French physicist Jean-Pierre Christin, permanent secretary of the Academy of Lyon, inverted the Celsius temperature scale so that 0 represented the freezing point of water and 100 represented the boiling point of water. On 19 May 1743 he published the design of a mercury thermometer, the "Thermometer of Lyon" built by the craftsman Pierre Casati that used this scale.

In 1744, coincident with the death of Anders Celsius, the Swedish botanist Carl Linnaeus (1707–1778) reversed Celsius's scale. His custom-made "Linnaeus-thermometer", for use in his greenhouses, was made by Daniel Ekström, Sweden's leading maker of scientific instruments at the time, whose workshop was located in the basement of the Stockholm observatory. As often happened in this age before modern communications, numerous physicists, scientists, and instrument makers are credited with having independently developed this same scale; among them were Pehr Elvius, the secretary of the Royal Swedish Academy of Sciences (which had an instrument workshop) and with whom Linnaeus had been corresponding; Daniel Ekström, the instrument maker; and Mårten Strömer (1707–1770) who had studied astronomy under Anders Celsius.

The first known Swedish document reporting temperatures in this modern "forward" Celsius temperature scale is the paper Hortus Upsaliensis dated 16 December 1745 that Linnaeus wrote to a student of his, Samuel Nauclér. In it, Linnaeus recounted the temperatures inside the orangery at the University of Uppsala Botanical Garden:

... since the caldarium (the hot part of the greenhouse) by the angle of the windows, merely from the rays of the sun, obtains such heat that the thermometer often reaches 30 degrees, although the keen gardener usually takes care not to let it rise to more than 20 to 25 degrees, and in winter not under 15 degrees ...

=== Centigrade and Celsius ===
Since the 19th century, the scientific and thermometry communities worldwide have used the phrase "centigrade scale" and temperatures were often reported simply as "degrees" or, when greater specificity was desired, as "degrees centigrade", with the symbol °C.

In the French language, the term centigrade also means one hundredth of a gradian, when used for angular measurement. The term centesimal degree was later introduced for temperatures but was also problematic, as it means gradian (one hundredth of a right angle) in the French and Spanish languages. The risk of confusion between temperature and angular measurement was eliminated in 1948 when the 9th meeting of the General Conference on Weights and Measures and the Comité International des Poids et Mesures (CIPM) formally adopted "degree Celsius" for temperature. (Note: According to The Oxford English Dictionary (OED), the term "Celsius thermometer" had been used at least as early as 1797. Further, the term "The Celsius or Centigrade thermometer" was again used in reference to a particular type of thermometer at least as early as 1850. The OED also cites this 1928 reporting of a temperature: "My altitude was about 5,800 metres, the temperature was 28° Celsius." However, dictionaries seek to find the earliest use of a word or term and are not a useful resource as regards the terminology used throughout the history of science. According to several writings of Terry Quinn, Director of the BIPM (1988–2004), including "Temperature Scales from the early days of thermometry to the 21st century" (PDF). Archived from the original (PDF) on 26 December 2010. (146 KiB) as well as Temperature (2nd Edition/1990/Academic Press/0125696817), the term Celsius in connection with the centigrade scale was not used whatsoever by the scientific or thermometry communities until after the CIPM and CGPM adopted the term in 1948. The BIPM was not even aware that "degree Celsius" was in sporadic, non-scientific use before that time. It is also noteworthy that the twelve-volume, 1933 edition of OED didn't even have a listing for the word Celsius (but did have listings for both centigrade and centesimal in the context of temperature measurement). The 1948 adoption of Celsius accomplished three objectives: 1. All common temperature scales would have their units named after someone closely associated with them; namely, Kelvin, Celsius, Fahrenheit, Réaumur and Rankine.; 2. Notwithstanding the important contribution of Linnaeus who gave the Celsius temperature scale its modern form, Celsius's name was the obvious choice because it began with the letter C. Thus, the symbol °C that for centuries had been used in association with the name centigrade could remain in use and would simultaneously inherit an intuitive association with the new name.; 3. The new name eliminated the ambiguity of the term "centigrade", freeing it to refer exclusively to the French-language name for the unit of angular measurement.)

While "Celsius" is commonly used in scientific work, "centigrade" is still used in French and English-speaking countries, especially in informal contexts. The frequency of the usage of "centigrade" has declined over time.

Due to metrication in Australia, after 1 September 1972 weather reports in the country were exclusively given in Celsius. In the United Kingdom, it was not until February 1985 that forecasts by BBC Weather switched from "centigrade" to "Celsius".

== Common temperatures ==
Equivalent temperatures in kelvin (K), Rankine (R), Celsius (°C), and Fahrenheit (°F)

All phase transitions are at standard atmosphere (defined as an air pressure of 1013.25 hectopascals or 760 millimeters of mercury). Figures are either by definition, or approximated from empirical measurements.

Key temperature scale relations
	Kelvin	Celsius	Fahrenheit	Rankine
Absolute zero (Note: Exact value, by SI definition of the kelvin)	0 K	−273.15 °C	−459.67 °F	0 °R
Boiling point of liquid nitrogen	77.4 K	−195.8 °C	−320.4 °F	139.3 °R
Sublimation point of dry ice	195.1 K	−78 °C	−108.4 °F	351.2 °R
Intersection of Celsius and Fahrenheit scales	233.15 K	−40 °C	−40 °F	419.67 °R
Melting point of ice	273.1501 K	0.0001 °C	32.0002 °F	491.6702 °R
Common room temperature (Note: NIST common reference temperature, provided as round numbers)	293 K	20 °C	68 °F	528 °R
Average normal human body temperature	310.15 K	37.0 °C	98.6 °F	558.27 °R
Boiling point of water (Note: For Vienna Standard Mean Ocean Water at one standard atmosphere (101.325 kPa) when calibrated solely per the two-point definition of thermodynamic temperature. Older definitions of the Celsius temperature scale once defined the boiling point of water under one standard atmosphere as being precisely 100 °C. However, the current definition results in a boiling point that is actually 16.1 mK less. For more about the actual boiling point of water, see VSMOW in temperature measurement. A different approximation uses ITS-90, which approximates the temperature to 99.974 °C)	373.1339 K	99.9839 °C	211.971 °F	671.6410 °R

== Name and symbol typesetting ==
The "degree Celsius" has been the only SI unit whose full unit name contains an uppercase letter since 1967, when the SI base unit for temperature became the kelvin, replacing the capitalized term degrees Kelvin. The plural form is "degrees Celsius".

The general rule of the International Bureau of Weights and Measures (BIPM) is that the numerical value always precedes the unit, and a space is always used to separate the unit from the number, e.g. "30.2 °C" (not "30.2°C" or "30.2° C"). The only exceptions to this rule are for the unit symbols for degree, minute, and second for plane angle (°, ′, and ″, respectively), for which no space is left between the numerical value and the unit symbol. Other languages, and various publishing houses, may follow different typographical rules.

=== Unicode character ===
Unicode provides the Celsius symbol at code point U+2103 ℃ DEGREE CELSIUS. However, this is a compatibility character provided for roundtrip compatibility with legacy encodings. It easily allows correct rendering for vertically written East Asian scripts, such as Chinese. The Unicode standard explicitly discourages the use of this character: "In normal use, it is better to represent degrees Celsius '°C' with a sequence of U+00B0 ° DEGREE SIGN + U+0043 C LATIN CAPITAL LETTER C, rather than U+2103 ℃ DEGREE CELSIUS. For searching, treat these two sequences as identical."

== Temperatures and intervals ==
The degree Celsius is subject to the same rules as the kelvin with regard to the use of its unit name and symbol. Thus, besides expressing specific temperatures along its scale (e.g. "Gallium melts at 29.7646 °C" and "The temperature outside is 23 degrees Celsius"), the degree Celsius is also suitable for expressing temperature intervals: differences between temperatures or their uncertainties (e.g. "The output of the heat exchanger is hotter by 40 degrees Celsius", and "Our standard uncertainty is ±3 °C"). Because of this dual usage, one must not rely upon the unit name or its symbol to denote that a quantity is a temperature interval; it must be unambiguous through context or explicit statement that the quantity is an interval. (Note: In 1948, Resolution 7 of the 9th CGPM stated, "To indicate a temperature interval or difference, rather than a temperature, the word 'degree' in full, or the abbreviation 'deg' must be used." This resolution was abrogated in 1967/1968 by Resolution 3 of the 13th CGPM, which stated that "[The names "degree Kelvin" and "degree", the symbols "°K" and "deg" and the rules for their use given in Resolution 7 of the 9th CGPM (1948),] ...and the designation of the unit to express an interval or a difference of temperatures are abrogated, but the usages which derive from these decisions remain permissible for the time being." Consequently, there is now wide freedom in usage regarding how to indicate a temperature interval. The most important thing is that one's intention must be clear and the basic rule of the SI must be followed; namely that the unit name or its symbol must not be relied upon to indicate the nature of the quantity. Thus, if a temperature interval is, say, 10 K or 10 °C (which may be written 10 kelvins or 10 degrees Celsius), it must be unambiguous through obvious context or explicit statement that the quantity is an interval. Rules governing the expressing of temperatures and intervals are covered in the BIPM's "SI Brochure, 8th edition" (PDF). Archived from the original (PDF) on 18 June 2019. (1.39 MiB).) This is sometimes solved by using the symbol °C (pronounced "degrees Celsius") for a temperature, and C° (pronounced "Celsius degrees") for a temperature interval, although this usage is non-standard. Another way to express the same is "40 °C ± 3 K", which can be commonly found in literature.

Celsius measurement follows an interval system but not a ratio system; and it follows a relative scale, not an absolute scale. For example, an object at 20 °C does not have twice the energy of when it is 10 °C; and 0 °C is not the lowest Celsius value. Thus, degrees Celsius is a useful interval measurement but does not possess the characteristics of ratio measures like weight or distance.

== Coexistence with Kelvin ==
In science and in engineering, the Celsius and Kelvin scales are often used in combination in close contexts, e.g. "a measured value was 0.01023 °C with an uncertainty of 70 μK". This practice is permissible because the magnitude of the degree Celsius is equal to that of the kelvin. Notwithstanding the official endorsement provided by decision no. 3 of Resolution 3 of the 13th CGPM, which stated "a temperature interval may also be expressed in degrees Celsius", the practice of simultaneously using both °C and K remains widespread throughout the scientific world as the use of SI-prefixed forms of the degree Celsius (such as "μ°C" or "microdegrees Celsius") to express a temperature interval has not been widely adopted.

== Melting and boiling points of water ==
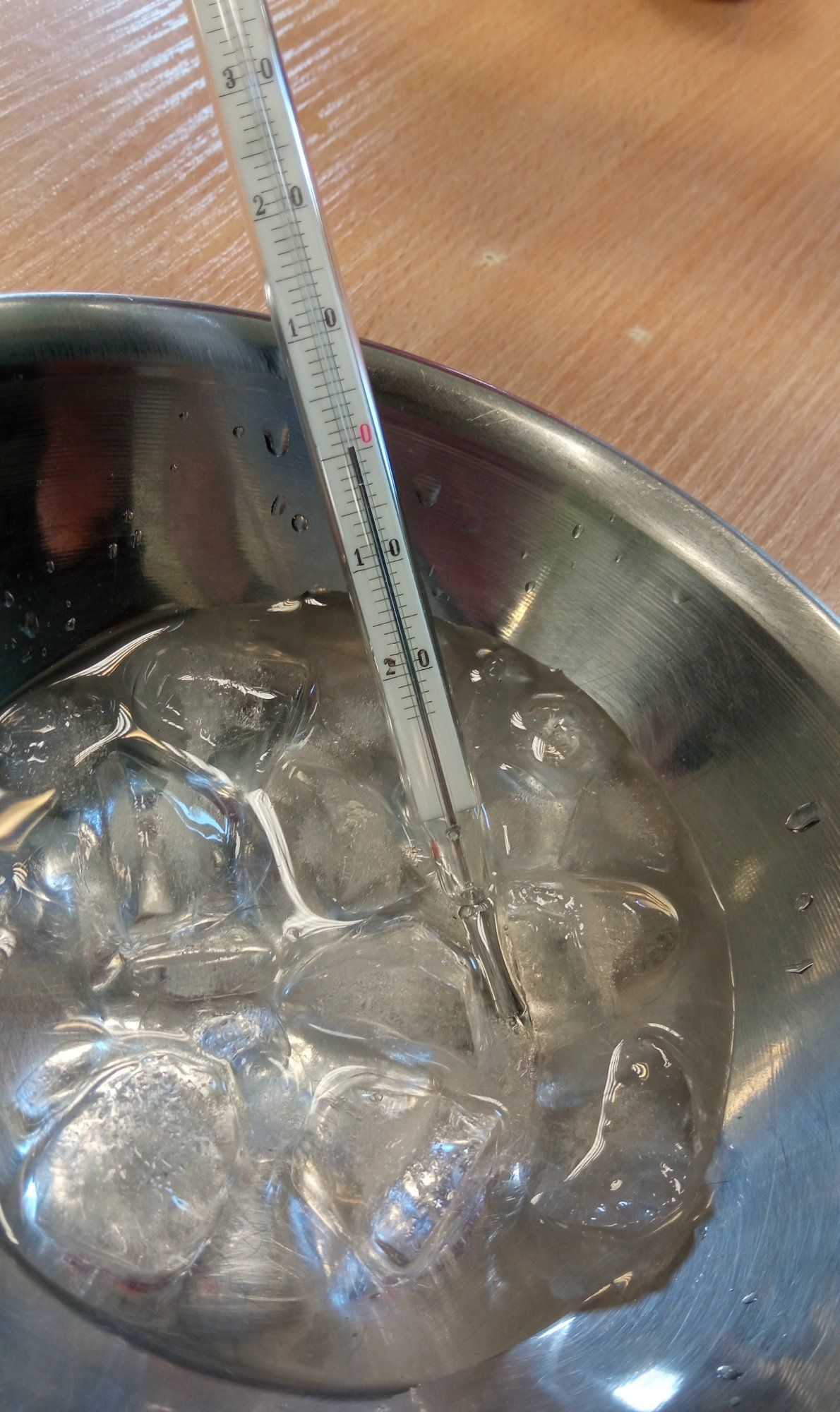
Measurement of an ice-water mixture in equilibrium at 370 m above sea level. Thermometer shows 0.05 °C. The slight deviation from 0 °C is due to instrument uncertainty and trace water impurities.

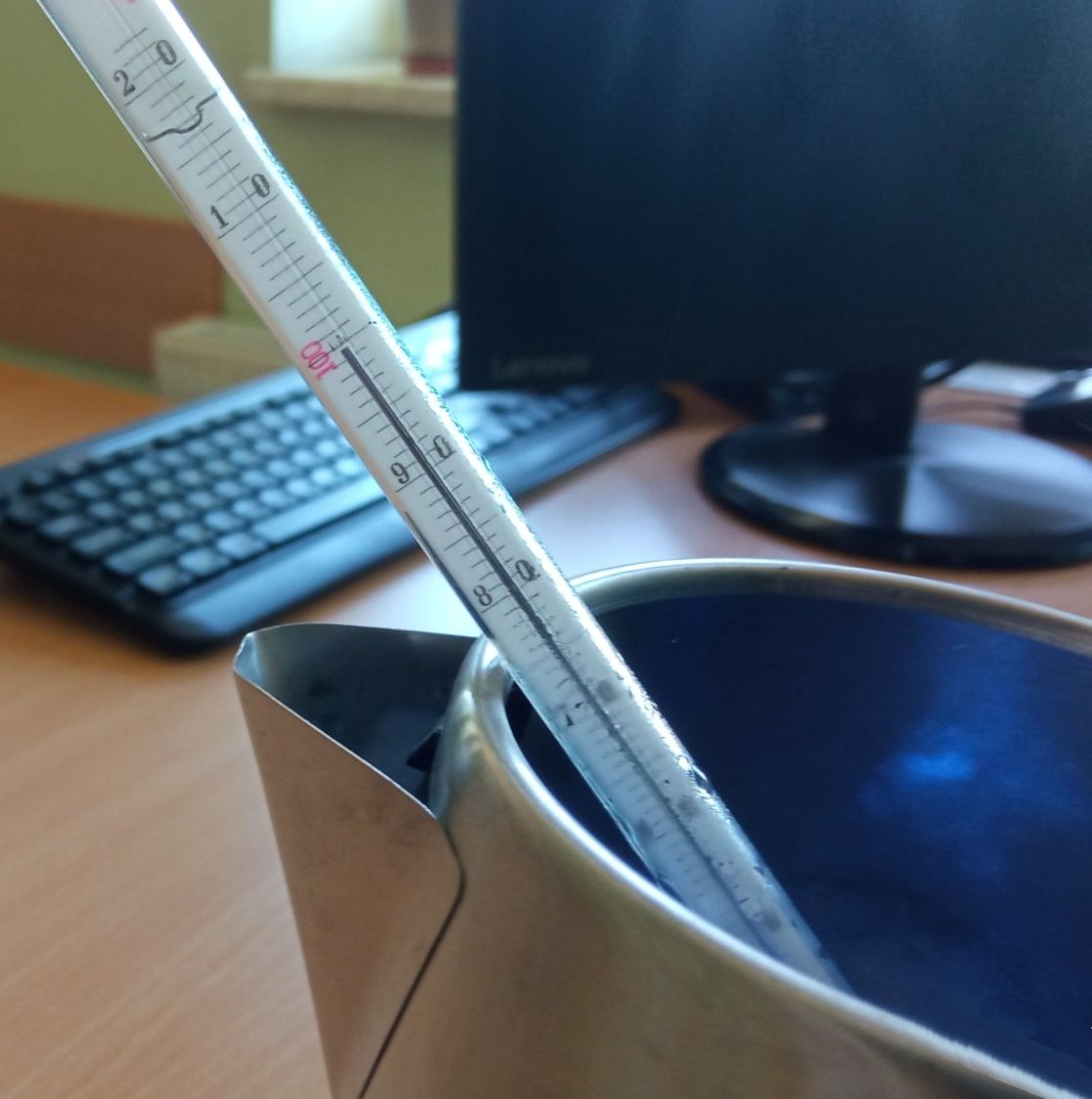
Boiling point of water measured at an altitude of ~370 m a.s.l. The 99.7 °C result reflects lower atmospheric pressure (~970 hPa), combined with minor instrument uncertainty and trace water impurities.

Celsius temperature conversion formulae
	from Celsius	to Celsius
Fahrenheit	x °C ≘ (x × 9/5 + 32) °F	x °F ≘ (x − 32) × 5/9 °C
Kelvin	x °C ≘ (x + 273.15) K	x K ≘ (x − 273.15) °C
Rankine	x °C ≘ (x + 273.15) × 9/5 °R	x °R ≘ (x − 491.67) × 5/9 °C
For temperature intervals rather than specific temperatures, 1 °C = 1 K = 9/5 °F = 9/5 °R; Conversion between temperature scales

The melting and boiling points of water are no longer part of the definition of the Celsius temperature scale. In 1948, the definition was changed to use the triple point of water. In 2005, the definition was further refined to use water with precisely defined isotopic composition (VSMOW) for the triple point. In 2019, the definition was changed to use the Boltzmann constant, completely decoupling the definition of the kelvin from the properties of water. Each of these formal definitions left the numerical values of the Celsius temperature scale identical to the prior definition to within the limits of accuracy of the metrology of the time.

When the melting and boiling points of water ceased being part of the definition, they became measured quantities instead. This is also true of the triple point.

In 1948 when the 9th General Conference on Weights and Measures (CGPM) in Resolution 3 first considered using the triple point of water as a defining point, the triple point was so close to being 0.01 °C greater than water's known melting point, it was simply defined as precisely 0.01 °C. However, later measurements showed that the difference between the triple and melting points of VSMOW is actually very slightly (< 0.001 °C) greater than 0.01 °C. Thus, the actual melting point of ice is very slightly (less than a thousandth of a degree) below 0 °C. Also, defining water's triple point at 273.16 K precisely defined the magnitude of each 1 °C increment in terms of the absolute thermodynamic temperature scale (referencing absolute zero). Now decoupled from the actual boiling point of water, the value "100 °C" is hotter than 0 °C – in absolute terms – by a factor of exactly 373.15/273.15 (approximately 36.61% thermodynamically hotter). When adhering strictly to the two-point definition for calibration, the boiling point of VSMOW under one standard atmosphere of pressure was actually 373.1339 K (99.9839 °C). When calibrated to ITS-90 (a calibration standard comprising many definition points and commonly used for high-precision instrumentation), the boiling point of VSMOW was slightly less, about 99.974 °C.

This boiling-point difference of 16.1 millikelvins between the Celsius temperature scale's original definition and the previous one (based on absolute zero and the triple point) has little practical meaning in common daily applications because water's boiling point is very sensitive to variations in barometric pressure. For example, an altitude change of only 28 cm (11 in) causes the boiling point to change by one millikelvin.

== See also ==
- Comparison of temperature scales
- Degree of frost
- Outline of metrology and measurement
- Thermodynamic temperature
