= Godfrey Stafford =

British physicist

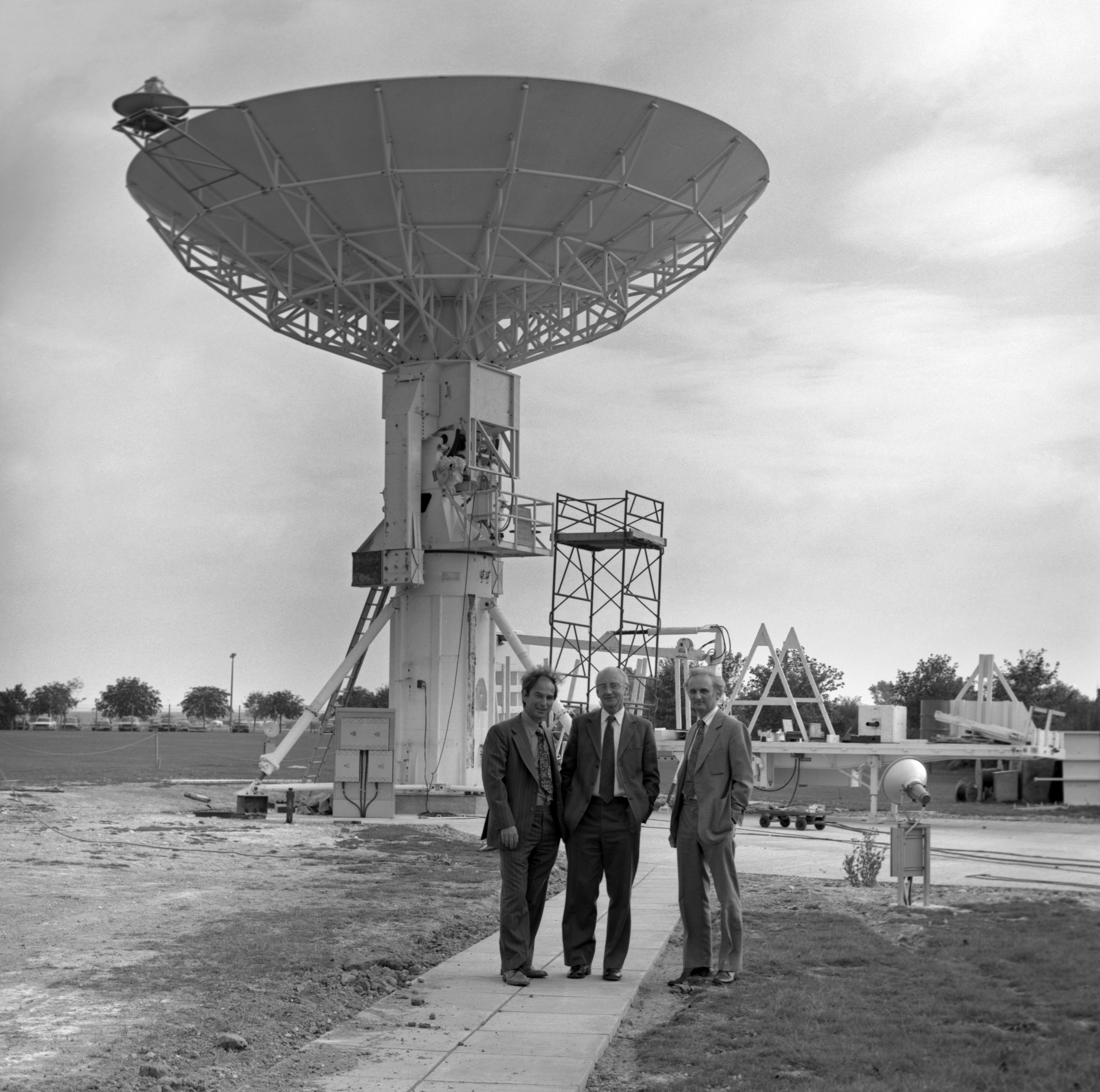

Godfrey Harry Stafford CBE, FRS (15 April 1920 – 30 July 2013), was a British physicist and directed the Rutherford Appleton Laboratories from 1969 to 1981. He went on to be a master at St Cross College, Oxford and president of the Institute of Physics. In 1950 Dr. Stafford married Helen Goldthorp Clark, an Australian biologist. He has a son and twin daughters and lived near Oxford.

== Early life and the Navy ==
Stafford was born in England in 1920 but moved to South Africa at the age of 8. He attended the University of Cape Town, where he came top of his class for physics and subsequently did an MSc researching cosmic rays in 1941. He joined the South African Naval Forces as a lieutenant electrical officer concerned with degaussing in the southern hemisphere.

With the end of hostilities, he entered Gonville and Caius College, Cambridge, as Ebden Scholar of the University of Cape Town, obtaining his Ph.D. in 1950. He later accepted a post with the South African Council for Scientific and Industrial Research as the head of its Biophysics Sub-Division. In 1954 after 2 1/2 years in Pretoria, Dr. Gerry Pickavance offered a job at Harwell in the Cyclotron Group.

== Rutherford Laboratory ==
The Rutherford Laboratory came into being in 1957 with Gerry Pickavance as the first Director and Stafford as the head of the Proton Linear Accelerator (PLA) Group. The PLA achieved its first full energy beam in 1959. By 1963 with the PLA a well established machine he became responsible for the high energy physics programme for the Nimrod (synchrotron). Stafford became Deputy Director on 1 April 1966. He has had close association with CERN, where he participated in the SC polarization experiment and various committee work, and was a keen supporter of the idea of a European Physical Society and became a Member of the Steering Committee for its formation. He later acted as Scientific Secretary to the Organising Committee for the inaugural meeting of the Society which was held in Florence in April 1969. He succeeded Gerry Pickavance in 1969 as director of the Rutherford Appleton Laboratory.

During his time at the Rutherford labs, he oversaw much expansion of the labs, including the takeover of the Atlas Computer Laboratory by the Rutherford Laboratory in 1975, and the development of superconducting 'Rutherford Cable' for magnets in future CERN accelerators.

== Later work and titles ==
Stafford was the second master of St Cross College, Oxford from 1979 to 1987. He headed the European Physical Society in 1984 was made president of the Institute of Physics in 1986. He received a CBE for his services to science and was made a Fellow of the Royal Society in 1979.
