= David Charlton =

British physicist

David Charlton FRS FInstP
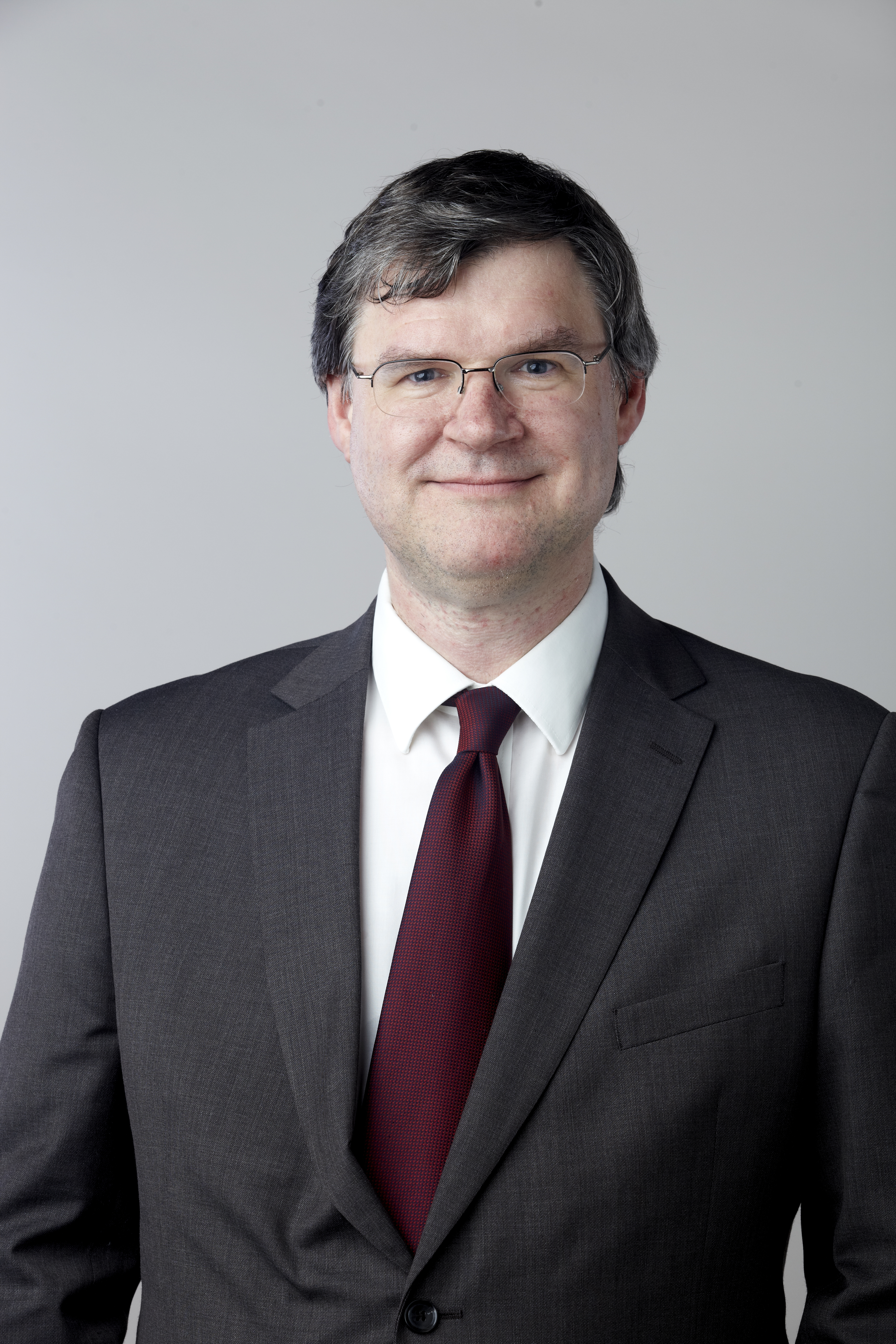
- David Charlton at the Royal Society admissions day in 2014
- Born: David George Charlton
- Education: University of Oxford (BA); University of Birmingham (PhD)
- Awards: Richard Glazebrook Medal and Prize (2017); Royal Society University Research Fellowship (1994)
- Scientific career
- Fields: Particle physics; Electroweak Physics; ATLAS experiment; Trigger systems for Physics
- Workplaces: CERN; University of Birmingham
- Thesis: A search for the top quark at the CERN proton-antiproton collider (1988)
- Website: birmingham.ac.uk/staff/profiles/physics/charlton-david.aspx

David George Charlton FRS FInstP is Professor of Particle Physics in the School of Physics and Astronomy at the University of Birmingham, UK. From 2013 to 2017, he served as Spokesperson (scientific head) of the ATLAS experiment at the Large Hadron Collider at CERN. Prior to becoming Spokesperson, he was Deputy Spokesperson for four years, and before that Physics Coordinator of ATLAS in the run-up to the start of collision data-taking.

== Education ==
Charlton was educated at the University of Oxford, graduating with a Bachelor of Arts degree in physics in 1985. He went on to study for a PhD in Particle Physics at the University of Birmingham, which he was awarded in 1989 for work on the UA1 experiment, searching for the top quark.

== Career and research ==
Charlton's research investigates the Higgs mechanism and electroweak symmetry breaking. He is regarded as a leader in the experimental elucidation of electroweak symmetry-breaking, culminating in the observation and first characterisation of a Higgs boson, at the Large Hadron Collider (LHC). His research has been funded by the Science and Technology Facilities Council (STFC).

From 1989 to 2001, Charlton worked on the OPAL experiment of the Large Electron–Positron Collider (LEP) at CERN, on data analysis, components of the trigger and data acquisition systems, and the identification of muons. His work helped to provide the first measurement there of the yield of Z decays, before measurement of the fraction decaying to bottom quarks. Later he led the measurements which directly demonstrated the gauge structure of the electroweak sector of the Standard Model.

At the LHC, he led physics preparations in the year before first collisions, acted as ATLAS Deputy Spokesperson throughout the first three-year running period, and was the collaboration's Spokesperson from 2013–2017. During the construction of the ATLAS experiment, he worked on hybrid readout circuits for the silicon strip sensors of the Semiconductor Tracker (SCT) detector and on the first-level calorimeter trigger system.

As a professor at the University of Birmingham, he conceived and led design group studies for Year 3 undergraduate students for several years, and also introduced and taught a Year 4 module named Current Topics in Particle Physics. His lecturing was in abeyance whilst he held the position of Spokesperson at ATLAS.

=== Awards and honours ===
Charlton was elected a Fellow of the Royal Society (FRS) in 2014. In 2017, Charlton was awarded the Richard Glazebrook Medal and Prize by the Institute of Physics for his leadership in experimental particle physics. He was elected a Fellow of the Institute of Physics (FInstP) and awarded a Royal Society University Research Fellowship (URF) in 1994.
