= List of fellows of the Royal Society elected in 2011 =

Fellows of the Royal Society elected in 2011.

== Fellows (FRS) ==
1. Robin Allshire
2. Andrew Balmford
3. Jeremy Baumberg
4. Hagan Bayley
5. Béla Bollobás
6. Doreen Cantrell
7. Stan Cowley
8. Alan Cowman
9. Alun Millward Davies
10. Nicholas Peter Franks
11. Ian Hector Frazer
12. Steven J. Gamblin
13. John William Goodby
14. Alan Grafen
15. Clare P Grey
16. Janet Hemingway
17. Ian Horrocks
18. Sir Colin Humphreys
19. Alejandro Kacelnik
20. Robert Charles Kennicutt
21. Steffen Lilholt Lauritzen
22. Yuk Ming Dennis Lo
23. Ian Manners
24. David Eusthatios Manolopoulos
25. Gerhard Theodor Materlik
26. James McKernan
27. Tom McLeish
28. Sir David Roberts McMurtry
29. Mervyn John Miles
30. Arthur David Milner
31. John Morton
32. Sean Munro
33. Werner Nahm
34. Kostya Novoselov
35. Mark Pagel
36. (Ronald) John Parkes
37. Fiona Powrie
38. Mark Felton Randolph
39. Leonard Robert Stephens
40. Patrick Ping Leung Tam
41. Simon Tavaré
42. Angela Carmen Vincent
43. Sir Mark Walport
44. Robert Watson

== Foreign Members (ForMemRS) ==
1. David Chandler
2. Joanne Chory
3. Mikhail Gromov
4. Thomas J.R. Hughes
5. Phillip Allen Sharp
6. Carla J Shatz
7. Thomas Steitz
8. Edward Manin Stolper
