= Colin Carlile =

British physicist and research institute director

- Awards: Richard Glazebrook Medal and Prize (2007); Order of the Polar Star (2013)
- Scientific career
- Fields: Physics
- Workplaces: Uppsala University; European Spallation Source; Institut Laue–Langevin

Colin Carlile is a British physicist. He has taught at the Uppsala University and served as the director of the European Spallation Source and the Institut Laue–Langevin. He won a Richard Glazebrook Medal and Prize in 2007 and was awarded an Order of the Polar Star in 2013.
