= Denny High School =

Coordinates: 56.021°N 3.897°W

- Denny, Falkirk

Information
- Type: Public non-denominational
- Motto: Summa Peto
- Established: 1959
- Rector: P. Dunn (since 2021)
- Staff: 129
- Enrollment: 1316
- Website: www.dennyhigh.falkirk.sch.uk

Denny High School in Scotland is a non-denominational public secondary school. The school was opened in 1959, and moved to a new building in February 2009. The new school contains a gymnasium, swimming pool and drama studio. The school serves an area of 25 square miles (65 km^{2}) around the area of Denny, Falkirk, including Bonnybridge, Dunipace, Banknock and Dennyloanhead. In 2004, Denny High School had a roll of 1316 pupils and 95 teachers. It also employed 34 non-teaching staff.

== Alumni ==
- David Marshall (born 1941), Member of Parliament (MP) for Glasgow Shettleston 1979–2005, Glasgow East 2005–08
- Andrew D. Taylor (born 1950) OBE FRS FRSE FInstP Director of the Science and Technology Facilities Council (STFC)
- Karine Polwart (born 1970), singer-songwriter and folk musician
