= Andrew D. Taylor =

British physicist

Andrew Taylor CBE FRS FRSE FInstP
- Born: Andrew Dawson Taylor; 1950 (age 75–76); Falkirk
- Education: Denny High School
- Alma mater: University of Glasgow (BSc); University of Oxford (DPhil)
- Awards: Richard Glazebrook Medal and Prize (2006)
- Scientific career
- Institutions: Science and Technology Facilities Council; ISIS neutron source
- Thesis: Inelastic neutron scattering by chemical rate processes (1976)

Andrew Dawson Taylor (born 1950) was director of the Science and Technology Facilities Council National Laboratories – Rutherford Appleton Laboratory, Daresbury Laboratory, and the UK Astronomy Technology Centre in Edinburgh until his retirement in 2019.

== Education ==
Taylor was educated at Denny High School, the University of Glasgow and the University of Oxford where he was a postgraduate student of St John's College, Oxford. He was awarded a Doctor of Philosophy degree in 1976 for research using inelastic neutron scattering.

== Career and research ==
Taylor's research interests are in neutron science, neutron sources and neutron scattering, he is recognised as an international leader in the development of large-scale research facilities and their infrastructures.

=== Awards and honours ===
Taylor was elected a Fellow of the Royal Society (FRS) in 2019 for "substantial contributions to the improvement of natural knowledge". He was appointed Officer of the Order of the British Empire (OBE) in the 1999 Birthday Honours and Commander of the Order of the British Empire (CBE) in the 2020 New Year Honours for services to science and technology. He was also elected a Fellow of the Institute of Physics (FInstP) and a Fellow of the Royal Society of Edinburgh (FRSE) in 2006. He was awarded the Richard Glazebrook Medal and Prize by the Institute of Physics in 2006.
