= Pavlos Lagoudakis =

Greek and Russian physicist

- Education: University of Athens, University of Southampton
- Scientific career
- Fields: Quantum Fluids of Light, Semiconductor physics, Solid State Physics
- Workplaces: Skolkovo Institute of Science and Technology (Skoltech), University of Southampton
- Doctoral advisor: Jeremy Baumberg

Pavlos G. Lagoudakis is a Greek and Russian physicist. He is a Distinguished Professor and Provost at the Skolkovo Institute of Science and Technology (Skoltech).

== Early life and education ==
Lagoudakis completed his undergraduate studies (B.Sc. in Physics) at the University of Athens, Greece, graduating in 2000. He was awarded his Doctor of Philosophy (PhD in Physics) in 2003 from the University of Southampton, United Kingdom. During his postgraduate research he investigated the physics of exciton-polaritons in semiconductor microcavities under the supervision of Jeremy Baumberg. He subsequently conducted postdoctoral research at LMU Munich, Germany, focusing on the optoelectronic properties of organic semiconductors and colloidal nanoparticles.

== Academic career ==
In 2006, Lagoudakis was awarded a Roberts Fellowship and joined the Department of Physics and Astronomy at the University of Southampton, UK, as a lecturer. In 2008, he was appointed to a personal chair (2008-2024) and later became Director for Research in the Department of Physics and Astronomy (2013–2019). Between 2011 and 2014, he chaired the University’s Nanoscience Research Strategy Group. Between 2013-2014, he was a visiting professor at the École Polytechnique Fédérale de Lausanne, Switzerland. In 2008, he was awarded a JSPS academic research fellowship at the University of Hokkaido, Japan, where he collaborated with Oliver Wright. In 2016, he established the Hybrid Photonics Laboratory at Skoltech. Between 2024 and 2025, Lagoudakis has served as a Distinguished Professor, Director of the Center for Photonic Science and Engineering, and Senior Vice President for Basic Research at Skoltech. Since 2025, Lagoudakis is serving as Provost for Research and Education at Skoltech.

== Research ==
Lagoudakis’s research spans light–matter interactions, hybrid photonic systems, and quantum fluids of light.

== Awards and recognition ==
- IUPAP Young Scientist Prize in Quantum Electronics (2011) – for contributions to polaritonics and hybrid photonics
- VYZOV Prize for Future Technologies (2023) – for pioneering work in polariton-based computing and creation of optical transistors

== Affiliations ==
- Skolkovo Institute of Science and Technology – Distinguished Professor, Director of the Center for Photonic Science & Engineering, Provost for Research and Education.
- University of Southampton – Former Professor of Physics, Department of Physics and Astronomy.
