= Heather Melville =

British banker (born 1962)

Heather Melville OBE, CCMI
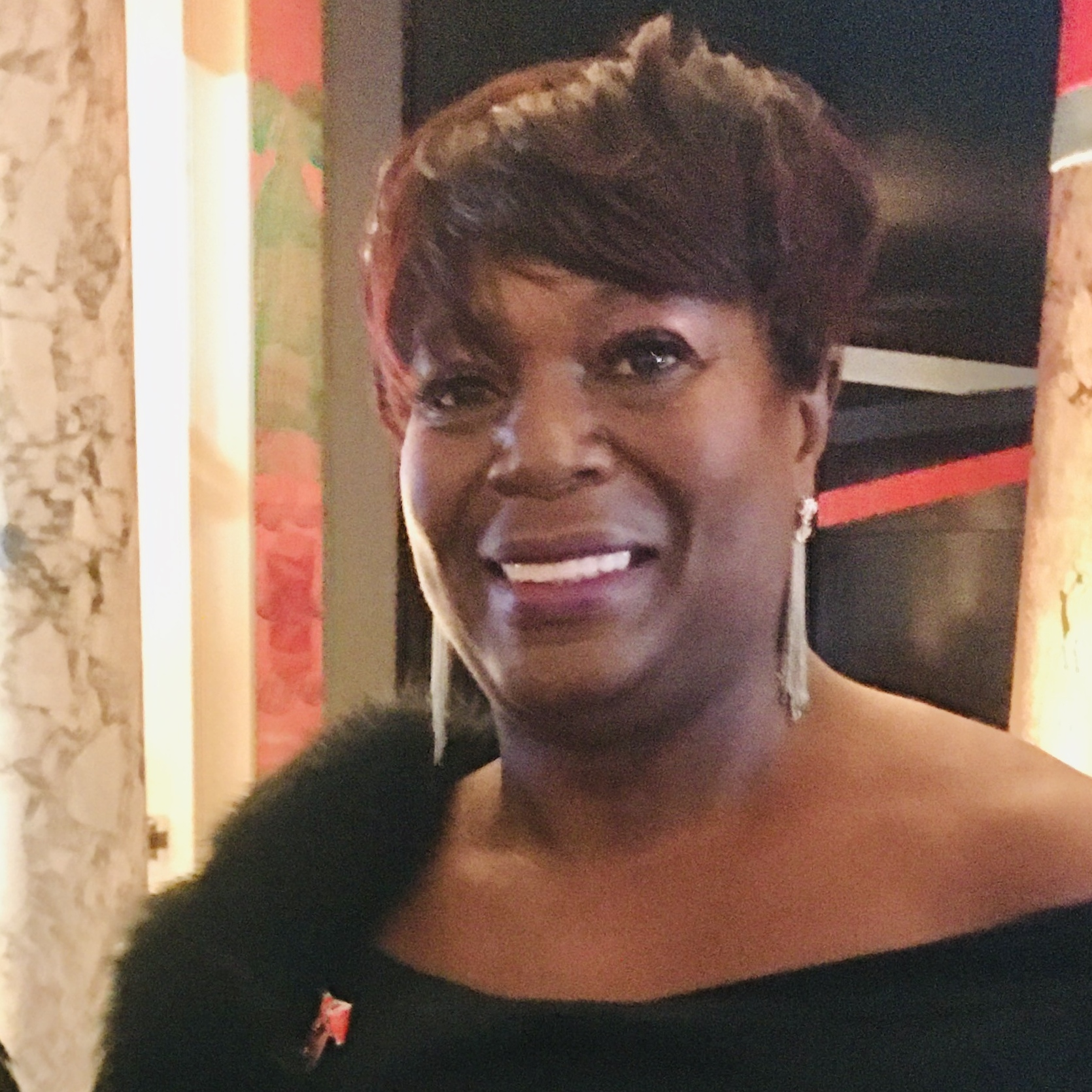
- Born: 22 December 1962 (age 63); London, UK
- Occupations: 7th chancellor of the University of York and senior managing director of Teneo
- Years active: Since 1990
- Known for: Founder and global chair of RBS Focused Women's Network
- Title: Chair of advisory committee and member of the board of trustees of Chartered Management Institute
- Children: 2

Heather Patricia Melville OBE, CCMI (born 1962) is a British banker, senior managing director of Teneo and chancellor of the University of York.

== Early life ==
Melville was born in December 1962 of Jamaican parents. She grew up in Hornsey, north London, and she was educated at the IBM Business School, Hampshire.

== Career ==
Melville was director for strategic partnerships and head of business inclusion initiatives at Royal Bank of Scotland Group. In September 2016, She was appointed to the board and as chair of the advisory committee for 'CMI Women', Chartered Management Institute. Melville is a diversity, inclusion leader and founder and global chair of RBS Focused Women's Network. She is recognized in Financial Times 2016 inaugural UPstanding100 Executive BAME Power List (UK & US) and Financial Times 2017 Empower 100 ethnic minority leaders 100. In 2017 Melville was recognized and honoured with an Order of the British Empire for her ‘services to Gender Equality’ and was included in the 2019 edition of the Powerlist, ranking the 100 most influential Black Britons.

Melville is the founder and global chair of RBS Focused Women's Network, which in 2016 had about 12,000 members in 33 countries who are managed by volunteers.

Also in 2017, Heather was awarded an honorary doctorate from Portsmouth University, recognising her influence and impact on diversity in business. In 2021 Heather received the President's Medal for leadership from the British Academy of Management.

She holds a number of trustee positions, is chair of CMI Women, NED, Enfield Enterprise, a Patron of Women in Banking and Finance and is a member of the Executive Leadership Council, a global network of C-suite leaders.

In 2022 it was announced that Melville was to become the seventh chancellor of the University of York, due to her work to "support a real culture of fairness, equality and justice". She was appointed on 18 January 2023 in a ceremony where she bestowed honorary degrees on the actor Colin Salmon and the banker Dame Alison Rose.

For some number of years, Melville has sat on the judging panel for the “UK Fashion & Textile Awards”, "The National Diversity Awards", "We Are the City Rising Stars" as well as the "Brummel's Top 30".

== Honors and awards ==
- 2010: "Champion for Women of Achievement Award" by Women in Banking & Finance
- 2012: "World of Difference 100 Award for the Economic Empowerment of Women" by TIAW
- 2012: "The World of Difference Awards" as one of the top 100 Women Making a Difference Globally in the Corporate Space, Washington, US
- 2015: "Special Commendation for Diversity Champion" by National Excellence Awards
- "Chartered Management Institute (CMI) Companion" by Chartered Management Institute
- 2016: "Inaugural UPstanding100 Executive BAME Power List (UK & US)" by Financial Times

Academic offices
Preceded by Malcolm Grant	Chancellor of the University of York; 2023-present	Incumbent
