= Gerhard Materlik =

German physicist

- Born: 16 January 1945 (age 81); Marl, Germany
- Education: University of Dortmund (PhD)
- Awards: CBE (2007); FRS (2011); Glazebrook Medal (2014)
- Scientific career
- Fields: Physics instrumentation; X-ray physics
- Workplaces: DESY; University College London; Diamond Light Source

Gerhard Theodor Materlik CBE FRS (born 16 January 1945) is a German physicist and science manager. He has made significant contributions to X-ray physics, notably improvements in the real-world application of synchrotron radiation. He is a Professor of Facilities Science at the University College London since 2013.

== Education and early career ==
Materlik completed his undergraduate education in physics at the University of Münster and LMU Munich in 1970. He obtained his doctorate from the University of Dortmund in 1975. After postdoctoral appointments at Cornell University (1975–1977) and Bell Laboratories, he took a job at the German Electron Synchrotron (DESY) in Hamburg.

== Work ==
From 2001 to 2013, Materlik was Chief Executive of the Diamond Light Source, the United Kingdom's synchrotron facility. He was the leader of the team that constructed the accelerators, which speed up electrons to near the speed of light, and also the instrumentation installed to apply this radiation in experiments covering a spectral range from infrared radiation up to X-rays.

His discoveries have become widely used experimental methods. He has published more than 200 papers. He assisted in the development of synchrotron sources worldwide.

== Awards and honours ==
In 2007, Materlik was awarded a Commander of the Most Excellent Order of the British Empire and became a Fellow of the Institute of Physics. He was elected a Fellow of the Royal Society (FRS) in 2011. His certificate of election reads:

Gerhard Materlik has made important discoveries in the science and application of Synchroton Radiation and is the leader of the team that constructed and now operates the world leading Diamond Light Source facility. He has contributed to the many fields in the application of synchrotron x-rays (SXR) most of which are now widely used experimental methods with SXR. He has made notable contributions to the improvement of SXR sources, notably the soft X-ray FEL, FLASH at DESY, the newly commissioned hard X-ray FEL, LCLS at SLAC and the hard X-ray FEL, E-XFEL, currently been built at DESY.

In 2014 he was awarded the Glazebrook Medal by the Institute of Physics for his leadership in establishing a world-leading laboratory at the Diamond Light Source.
