= Hugh E. Montgomery =

American physicist

Hugh Elliot Montgomery (born March 21, 1948) is a British-born US physicist. He had been appointed director of the Thomas Jefferson National Accelerator Facility in 2008. From 2002 until 2008, he was associate director for research at the Fermi National Accelerator Laboratory in Batavia, Illinois.

Montgomery received his Ph.D. in physics from the University of Manchester in 1972. He worked at the Daresbury Nuclear Physics Laboratory and Rutherford High Energy Laboratory until 1978. From 1978 to 1983, he was a staff member at CERN. He was Spokesperson of the D0 Experiment at Fermilab from 1993 to 1999.

Montgomery was awarded the very prestigious 2016 Glazebrook Medal by the Institute of Physics.
