= Jeremy Baumberg =

British physicist

Jeremy Baumberg FRS FInstP
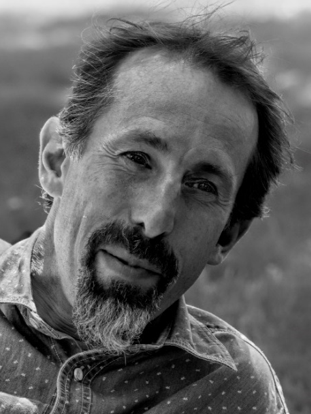
- Baumberg in 2015
- Born: Jeremy John Baumberg; 14 March 1967 (age 59)
- Education: University of Cambridge (BA); University of Oxford (DPhil)
- Awards: Young Medal and Prize (2013); Mullard Award (2004); Rumford Medal (2014); Faraday Medal and Prize (2017)
- Scientific career
- Fields: Nanophotonics; Plasmonics; Metamaterials; Microcavities
- Workplaces: University of Cambridge; University of Southampton; University of California, Santa Barbara
- Thesis: Coherent nonlinear optical processes in semiconductors (1992)
- Doctoral students: Pavlos Savvidis
- Website: www.phy.cam.ac.uk/directory/baumbergj

Jeremy John Baumberg, FRS, FInstP (born 14 March 1967) is a British physicist who is professor of nanoscience in the Cavendish Laboratory at the University of Cambridge, a fellow of Jesus College, Cambridge, and director of the NanoPhotonics Centre.

== Education ==
Baumberg was born on 14 March 1967. He was educated at the University of Cambridge, where he was an undergraduate student of Jesus College, Cambridge, and awarded a Bachelor of Arts degree in natural sciences in 1988. He moved to the University of Oxford, where he was awarded a Doctor of Philosophy degree in 1993. During his postgraduate study he was a student of Jesus College, Oxford, and supervised by John Francis Ryan, where his doctoral research investigated nonlinear optics in semiconductors.

== Career and research ==
Following his PhD, Baumberg was a visiting IBM Research fellow at the University of California, Santa Barbara (UCSB) from 1994 to 1995. He returned to the UK to work in the Hitachi Cambridge Lab from 1995 to 1998 before being appointed professor of nano-scale physics at the University of Southampton from 1998 to 2007 where he co-founded Mesophotonics Limited, a Southampton University spin-off company.

Baumberg's research is in nanotechnology, including nanophotonics, plasmonics, metamaterials and optical microcavities. He is interested in the development of nanostructured optical materials that undergo unusual interactions with light, and his research has various commercial applications. His early work led to the development of a number of pioneering experimental techniques.

Baumberg appeared in the documentary The Secret Life of Materials in 2015 and a Horizon documentary about Schön scandal first broadcast in 2004.

=== Awards and honours ===
Baumberg has received several awards for his research including the Mullard Award in 2004 and Rumford Medal in 2014, both from the Royal Society. The Institute of Physics (IOP) awarded Baumberg with the Silver Young Medal and Prize in 2013 and the Gold Faraday Medal and Prize in 2017. Baumberg was elected a Fellow of the Royal Society (FRS) in 2011.

== Publications ==
- The Secret Life of Science: How It Really Works and Why It Matters (Princeton UP, 2018)

== Personal life ==
Baumberg is the son of the late Simon Baumberg OBE, a microbiologist and who served as Professor of bacterial genetics at the University of Leeds from 1966 to 2005.
