= Christopher Llewellyn Smith =

British particle physicist

Chris Llewellyn Smith FRS HonFInstP
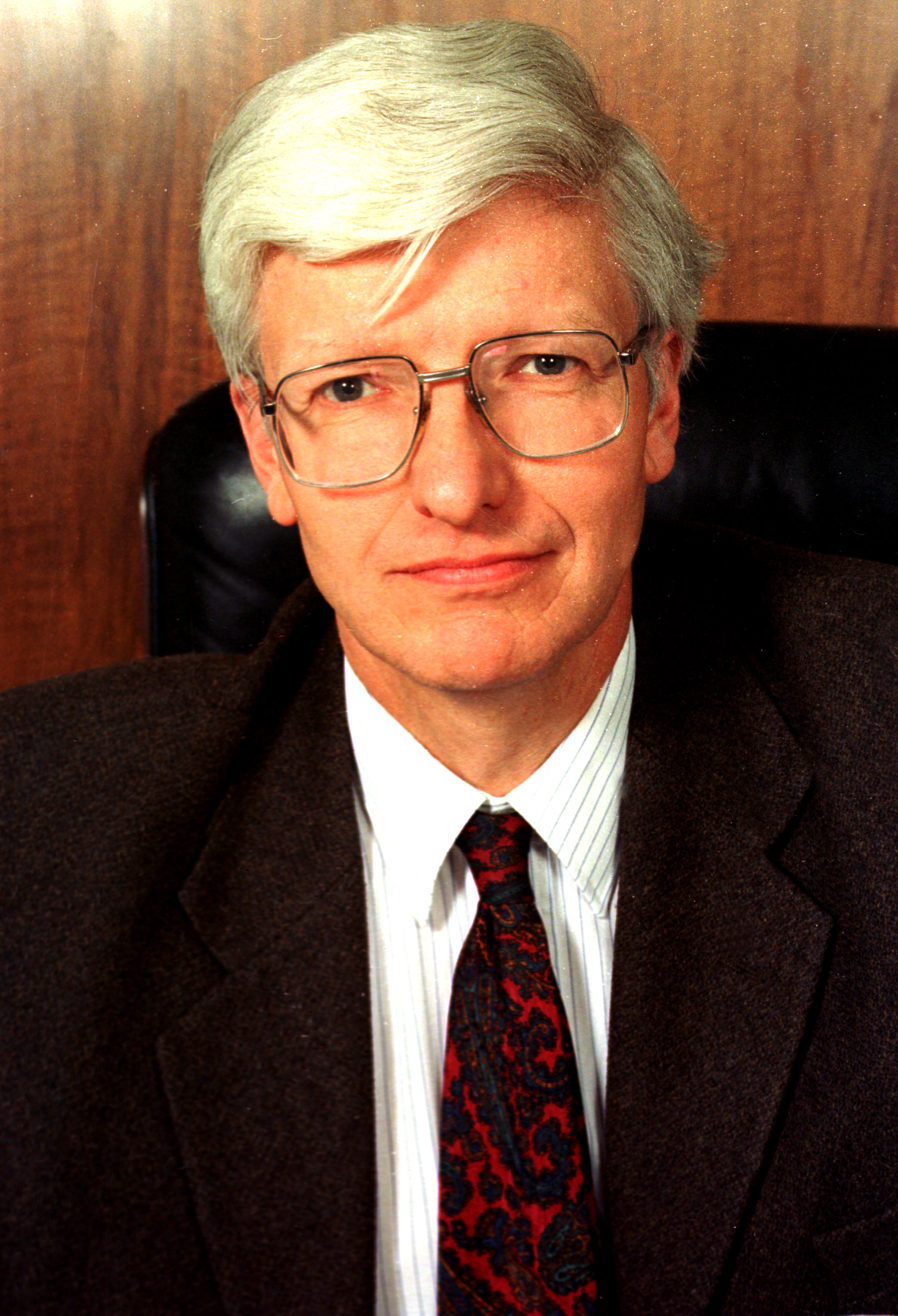
- Llewellyn Smith in 1996

Provost of University College, London
- In office 1999–2002
- Preceded by: Derek Roberts
- Succeeded by: Derek Roberts

Personal details
- Born: Christopher Hubert Llewellyn Smith; 19 November 1942 (age 83)
- Children: 2
- Education: University of Oxford (BA, DPhil)
- Profession: Physicist
- Website: www2.physics.ox.ac.uk/contacts/people/llewellyn-smith
- Scientific career
- Awards: Richard Glazebrook Medal and Prize; Royal Medal
- Workplaces: CERN; University of Oxford; University College London; SLAC National Accelerator Laboratory; Lebedev Physical Institute; UKAEA
- Thesis: Some problems in elementary particle physics (1967)
- Doctoral advisor: Richard Dalitz
- Doctoral students: John Wheater; Ash Carter; Ian Hinchliffe; Nikolas Mavromatos

Sir Christopher Hubert Llewellyn Smith FRS HonFInstP (born 19 November 1942) is an emeritus professor of physics at the University of Oxford.

== Education ==
Llewellyn Smith was educated at the University of Oxford (BA) and completed his Doctor of Philosophy degree in theoretical physics at New College, Oxford in 1967.

== Career and research ==
After his DPhil he worked at the Lebedev Physical Institute in Moscow, CERN and then the SLAC National Accelerator Laboratory before returning to Oxford in 1974. Llewellyn Smith was elected a fellow of the Royal Society in 1984.

While chairman of Oxford Physics (1987–92), he led the merger of five different departments into a single Physics Department. Llewellyn Smith was director general of CERN from 1994 to 1998. Thereafter he served as provost and president of University College London (1999–2002).

=== Awards and honours ===
Llewellyn Smith received the James Clerk Maxwell Medal and Prize in 1979, and Glazebrook Medal and Prize of the Institute of Physics in 1999 and was knighted in 2001. In 2004, he became chairman of the Consultative Committee for Euratom on Fusion (CCE-FU). Until 2009 he was director of UKAEA Culham Division, which holds the responsibility for the United Kingdom's fusion programme and operation of the Joint European Torus (JET). He is a member of the Advisory Council for the Campaign for Science and Engineering. In 2013, he joined the National Institute of Science Education and Research (NISER), Bhubaneswar, India as a distinguished professor. In 2015, he was awarded the Royal Medal of the Royal Society.

== Personal life ==
Llewellyn Smith married in 1966 and has one son and one daughter.

Preceded by Carlo Rubbia	Director General of CERN; 1994 – 1998	Succeeded by Luciano Maiani
Academic offices
Preceded by Derek Roberts	Provost of University College, London; 1999 – 2002	Succeeded by Derek Roberts
