= Terence Quinn =

British physicist

Terence John Quinn CBE FRS
- Quinn in 2016
- Born: 19 March 1938; Farnham, UK
- Education: University of Southampton (BSc, 1959); University of Oxford (PhD, 1963)
- Awards: Richard Glazebrook Prize (2003)
- Scientific career
- Workplaces: National Physical Laboratory; International Bureau of Weights and Measures
- Doctoral advisor: William Hume-Rothery

Terry Quinn CBE is a British physicist and was director of the International Bureau of Weights and Measures from 1978 to 2003.

== Education ==
Terry Quinn graduated in physics from University of Southampton in 1959 and then moved to Oxford for his PhD in what was then the Metallurgy Department under the supervision of Prof. William Hume-Rothery. In 1962, he joined the National Physical Laboratory in Teddington as a junior research fellow where he worked on radiation thermometry, temperature scales, and acoustic determination of the gas constant.

== BIPM ==
Dr. Quinn joined the BIPM as physicien chercheur principal on September 1977, to take up the position of Deputy Director starting on 1978. During this time he developed further interest in mass and balances resulting in a new determination of gravitational constant.

While at the BIPM he also continued collaboration in work at NPL on the development of the cryogenic radiometer, a method now universally employed for measuring electromagnetic radiation, and which led to determinations of the Stefan-Boltzmann constant. From 1984 to 1985 he was a Lady Margaret Distinguished Visiting Fellow at the Cavendish Laboratory, Cambridge, where he worked on the anelastic properties of a Cu-Be alloy used in flexure strip balances.

Dr. Quinn became director of BIPM on 1 August 1988 on the retirement of Prof. Giacomo. As director of the BIPM, Dr. Quinn has greatly increased international recognition of the importance of the role of accurate measurement in today's world. In 2002, he was elected a Fellow of the Royal Society and retired from the BIPM on 31 December 2003.

Dr. Quinn is a Fellow of the Institute of Physics (UK), a Fellow of American Physical Society and of the American Association for the Advancement of Science. Dr. Quinn was made a Commander of the Order of the British Empire (CBE) by the Queen in the 2004 New Year Honours list.

== Books ==
- Quinn, T. J. (1983). Temperature. Academic Press. ISBN 978-0-12-569680-7.
- Quinn, Terry (2011). From Artefacts to Atoms: The BIPM and the Search for Ultimate Measurement Standards. Oxford University Press. ISBN 978-0-19-530786-3.
