= Thomas Gerald Pickavance =

British nuclear physicist (1915–1991)

Thomas Gerald Pickavance CBE, FRS (19 October 1915 – 12 November 1991) was a British nuclear physicist who was a leading authority on the design and use of particle accelerators. He was generally known as Gerry Pickavance.

== Life and career ==
He was born in St Helens, Lancashire, the son of estate agent William Pickavance and his wife Ethel and was educated at the University of Liverpool.

He worked on the development of the University of Liverpool cyclotron and carried out research with it on the Tube Alloys project during the Second World War. He was later responsible for the construction of the Harwell cyclotron and became leader of the Accelerator Group.

During his time at Harwell he led research into new accelerators, which led to the installation in 1957 of the 50 MeV proton linear accelerator and the 8 GeV Nimrod Proton Synchrotron at the new Rutherford High Energy Laboratory, of which he was appointed the first Director. He was later Director of the Nuclear Physics Division of the Science Research Council and the second Chairman of the European Committee on Future Accelerators, an advisory body to CERN Management, CERN Council and its Committees.

In 1965, he was made a Commander of the Order of the British Empire and in 1976 elected a Fellow of the Royal Society. In 1979, he was awarded the Glazebrook Medal by the Institute of Physics.

He died in 1991. He had married Alice Boulton and had two sons and a daughter.
