= Malcolm Grant =

British lawyer, chairman of NHS England

Sir Malcolm Grant CBE FAcSS
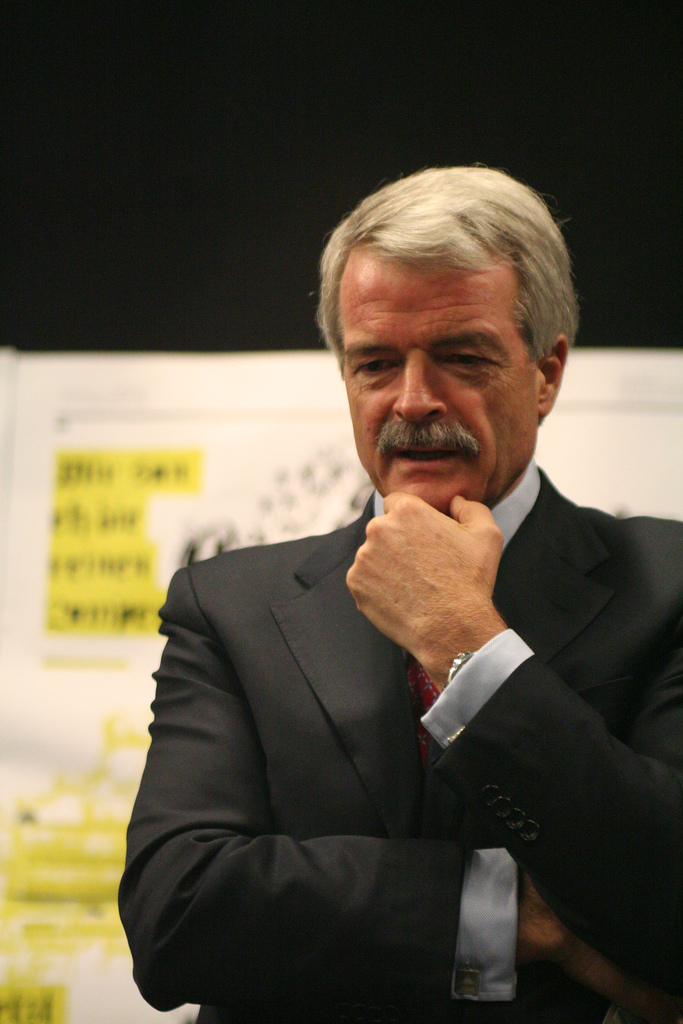

Chairman of NHS England
- In office 19 October 2011 – 30 October 2018
- Preceded by: Office established
- Succeeded by: The Lord Prior of Brampton

Chancellor of the University of York
- In office 27 October 2015 – Summer 2022
- Preceded by: Greg Dyke
- Succeeded by: Heather Melville

President and Provost of University College London
- In office 1 August 2003 – 1 September 2013
- Preceded by: Sir Derek Roberts
- Succeeded by: Michael Arthur

Personal details
- Born: 29 November 1947 (age 78) Oamaru, New Zealand
- Education: University of Otago

Sir Malcolm John Grant, CBE, FAcSS (born 29 November 1947) is a barrister, academic lawyer, and former law professor. Born and educated in New Zealand, he was the ninth President and Provost of University College London – the head as well as principal academic and administrative officer of the university – for over a decade from 2003 until 2013.

He then served for 7 years as chairman of NHS England (previously known as the NHS Commissioning Board). He has published extensively in planning and environmental law, and local government law, including serving for 23 years (1981–2004) as the editor of the 8 loose leaf volume Encyclopaedia of Planning Law and Practice of which he remains a consultant editor.

From 2015 to 2022, he was the Chancellor of the University of York.

== Early life, education and previous work ==
Grant was born and raised in Oamaru, New Zealand. He attended the state-run Waitaki Boys' High School and was organist at St Luke's Church. He went on to study at the University of Otago, where he respectively gained an LL.B. (1970), LL.M. (1973) and LL.D. degree (1986). He became a Lecturer in Law at Southampton University (1972–1986). He was then a Professor of Law and Vice-Dean, from 1986 until 1991, of the University College London Faculty of Laws.

In 1991, Grant was elected Professor of Land Economy at the University of Cambridge and a Professorial Fellow of Clare College. He then served as Head of the Department of Land Economy at Cambridge from 1993 until 2001, and in 2002 was appointed Pro-Vice-Chancellor of the university. Whilst there he led attempts to reform the governance of the university.

== President and Provost of UCL ==
In August 2003, Grant was appointed Provost and President of University College London, in succession to Sir Derek Roberts

During his 10-year tenure the university grew significantly, and steadily achieved high recognition in global university rankings, attaining place 4 in the world in the QS rankings by 2013. Five members of his senior team have themselves gone on to become university vice-chancellors: Professor Ed Byrne (Monash; then King's College London); Professor Ian Jacobs (University of New South Wales); Santa Ono (University of Michigan); Dr Steve Currall (University of South Florida) and Professor Anthony Finkelstein (City University, London)

In 2004, Grant launched "The Campaign for UCL", with the aim of generating £300 million for the university, to expand facilities and provide for new research initiatives. It was the biggest ever fundraising target set by a university in the United Kingdom, until Cambridge set a £1 billion target for its 800-year anniversary followed by the £3 billion target set by University of Oxford through the Oxford thinking campaign. Grant said of the "Campaign":

I have heard it suggested that the concept of philanthropy is somehow alien to the national psyche, and that asking for money is not the British thing to do. This is, frankly, nonsense. Most of our leading universities owe their origins to philanthropy. Without the generosity of our founding fathers, UCL would never have seen the light of day back in 1826. This campaign will enable UCL, a real British success story, to enjoy the kind of resources to enable us to compete with the world's very best academic institutions

— Interview with BBC News, 2004

In 2005, on an invitation from The Cheese Grater, he agreed to shave off his moustache if UCL students raised £1500 for Comic Relief, on Red Nose Day. Unfortunately for his moustache — of 33 years — students and staff duly donated over £2,000. However, it has since regrown.

In 2006, he spoke out against the Israel university boycotts by the Association of University Lecturers (now the Universities Colleges Union). In 2006 Grant also controversially stated that European students often had better English skills than many British students.

In 2007, Grant said the achievement and academic gap between male and female students was widening. Since 1998, 313,259 more women than men have made university applications. Malcolm Grant said, "the trend indicated a big fall in the number of university-educated men".

In January 2007, he argued that the entire nationwide university approach to funding needed to change. In regard to UCL's need for additional funding, he stated the reasons in an interview with the BBC:

To provide world-class research – through discovery, invention and creativity – and to convey the excitement of it to able young minds.

— Interview with BBC News, 2007

In June 2007, in response to legal threats from Alan Lakin, husband of a purveyor of herbal remedies, Grant required Professor David Colquhoun to remove his website, "Improbable Science" from university computers. An outcry from the scientific community ensued, and Grant reconsidered, inviting Dr. Colquhoun to bring the site back to UCL once it had been edited on counsel's advice.

In December 2011, the student union at UCL proposed a vote of No Confidence" in Grant, challenging his appointment as chair of the NHS Commissioning Board. In the ensuing referendum, the students of UCL voted confidence of Grant by 1699 votes to 1185, with 391 abstentions.

=== Criticism ===
In the Telegraph, Grant was criticised for allegedly downplaying Islamist radicalisation and extremism on the UCL campus. Umar Farouk Abdulmutallab – who attempted to explode a bomb on a flight to Detroit in December 2009 – had been the president of the UCL Islamic Society from 2005 to 2006. He was the fourth president of an official Islamic society at a London university to face terrorist charges in three years. In a robust response to the criticisms, Grant stated that he had ordered a review into the issue, and went on to restate the case for freedom of speech on university campuses. He refuted the insinuation that there was a problem with Islamic extremism at UCL, and accused some anonymous below the line contributors to the Telegraph of "Islamophobia". The Centre for Social Cohesion subsequently part of the neocon Henry Jackson Society issued a press briefing listing a number of alleged Islamist extremists who had recently spoken on the UCL campus after being officially invited by UCL's Islamic groups. One of its committee members Ruth Dudley Edwards criticised Grant's response, writing: "Rather than producing mealy-mouthed defensive statements... Provost Grant should seriously reconsider his position." On the other hand, UCL Professor John Sutherland, writing in the Guardian, defended the university's response of constructive engagement, which recommended "debate with extremists" and the promotion of an Islamic Awareness Week: "My own, partisan, view is that UCL's openness is morally justified.... But there are clear risks".

On his retirement in 2013 over £1mn was contributed by staff, students, alumni and supporters to create the Professor Sir Malcolm Grant Postgraduate Scholarship Fund whose purpose is to enable and encourage UCL alumni who show leadership potential, and who have financial need, to pursue Master’s studies at UCL.

== Other positions ==
Grant served two terms of appointment as Chair of the Local Government Commission for England (1996–2001), having been originally appointed a member of the commission from 1992. Whilst there he helped organise the new plans for electing members of London's local government. He was also Chair of the Standards Committee of the Greater London Authority, and Chair of the Association of London Government's Independent Panel on the Remuneration of Councillors in London (1998–2005).

In 2000, he was also appointed Chair of the UK's Agriculture & Environment Biotechnology Commission (2000–2005), the body set up in parallel with the Food Standards Agency and the Human Genetics Commission, to review regulation and public reception of new technologies including genetic modification. The membership of the AEBC brought together a varied group of individuals with different interests, including Robin Grove-White, then Chair of the Board of Greenpeace UK, and Justine Thornton, subsequently a High Court Judge. It published a series of reports, including Crops on Trial leading to Grant being appointed by the Government to chair the UK Independent Steering Board for the Public Debate on Genetically modified crops, from 2002 to 2003. He brought proponents and opponents to the table, and ensured that the public voice was heard in decisions relating to genetic modification.

Grant served from 2006 to 2009 as chair of the Russell Group of UK research universities, and as a Member of Council of the Royal Institution from 2007 to 2009.

He held a Prime Ministerial appointment as a British Business Ambassador from 2008 to 2018.

Grant served on the boards of the Higher Education Funding Council for England (HEFCE) (2008–2014), the Economic and Social Research Council (ESRC) (2010–2013) and the University Grants Committee of Hong Kong (2007–2015).

=== University of York ===
He served as Chancellor of the University of York between 2015 and 2022.

== Current roles ==
Grant has acted since 2013 as Senior Adviser to President Michael Crow of Arizona State University.

Grant has served since 2013 as an international member of the Council of the Project 5-100 launched by the Russian Government to enhance the global competitiveness of Russian universities, and as a member of the International Board of the Moscow Institute of Physics and Technology (MIPT).

Grant has also served on panels of France's Agence nationale de la recherche, including for the creation of new graduate schools and the IDEX program for restructuring of higher education and research in France.

In 2018, Grant was appointed Chair of the Governance Board of the PLuS Alliance, the global partnership between Arizona State University, King's College London, and the University of New South Wales.

In 2025, Grant was appointed as the Chair of the Board of Trustee Directors of The Engineering & Design Institute, London (TEDI-London) which is a Higher Education provider, founded by Arizona State University, King's College London and the University of New South Wales, Sydney.

== Awards ==
Grant is an Honorary Life Member of the Royal Town Planning Institute (1993–); an Honorary Member of the Royal Institution of Chartered Surveyors (1995–); and Honorary Life Member of the New Zealand Resource Management Law Association (1999). He was elected a Bencher of Middle Temple in 2004, and became Senior Bencher in 2023.

In 2003, Grant was appointed Commander of the Order of the British Empire (CBE) for services to planning law and local government.

He was appointed Officier de l'Ordre National de Mérite of France in 2004.

In 2013, Grant was knighted in the 2013 Birthday Honours List for services to higher education.

Grant has been awarded honorary degrees by: University of Otago (HonLLD; 2006); University College London (HonLLD; 2013); University of Cambridge (HonLLD; 2016); University of York (Hon DUniv; 2022); King’s College London (Hon DLitt; 2022).

He is an Honorary Fellow of Clare College, Cambridge (2016) and the Royal College of Physicians (2017)

Government offices
New office	Chairman of NHS England; 2011–2018	Succeeded by Lord Prior of Brampton
Academic offices
Preceded by Greg Dyke	Chancellor of the University of York; 2015–2022	Succeeded by Heather Melville
Preceded by Sir Derek Roberts	Provost of University College London; 2003–2013	Succeeded by Michael Arthur
