= Michael Arthur (physician) =

British academic

Sir Michael Arthur

President and Provost of University College London
- In office 1 September 2013 – 10 January 2021
- Preceded by: Malcolm Grant
- Succeeded by: Michael Spence

Personal details
- Born: 3 August 1954 (age 72) London, England
- Education: University of Southampton; University of California, San Francisco
- Website: http://www.ucl.ac.uk/provost/

Sir Michael James Paul Arthur (born 3 August 1954) is a British academic who was the tenth provost and president of University College London between 2013 and January 2021. Arthur had previously been chairman of the Russell Group of UK universities and the vice-chancellor of the University of Leeds between September 2004 and 2013.

== Early life ==
Arthur was born in Purley, London, England. He attended Burnt Mill School in Harlow, Essex, at a similar time to Bill Rammell. His father was a cabinet maker and his mother was a student liaison officer at an agricultural college. He went to the University of Southampton, where he graduated as a Bachelor of Medicine in 1977 and became a Doctor of Medicine in 1986. From 1987 to 1989 he studied at the University of California, San Francisco.

== Career ==
Arthur's academic career began at Southampton, where he was appointed research fellow and lecturer in medicine in 1982, senior lecturer in 1989 and, at the age of 37, to a chair of medicine in 1992. He became director of research at Southampton in 1995, head of the school of medicine in 1998 and dean of the Faculty of Medicine, Health and Life Sciences in 2003.

From 1 September 2004 he was vice-chancellor of the University of Leeds. At the time of his appointment, he was the first vice-chancellor of a Russell Group university to have attended a comprehensive school. According to the Yorkshire Post, his salary was £253,000.

Arthur was appointed president and provost of University College London (UCL) on 10 December 2012, starting in September 2013, to succeed Sir Malcolm Grant. He stepped down on 10 January 2021, replaced by Michael Spence.

Arthur was knighted in the 2022 Birthday Honours for services to higher education.

== Controversy ==
In 2009, during his time as Vice Chancellor of the University of Leeds, Arthur was subject to a motion of no confidence from the Leeds branch of University and College Union (UCU) due to his proposed 10% cut in academic staff. Earlier in the next year, UCU voted to strike after 54 staff at the University lost their jobs, in the midst of plans for 700 more to suffer the same fate. This strike was supported by a record turnout (64%) with 78% voting in favour of the strike.

In 2015, Arthur accepted the resignation of Professor Tim Hunt, after a controversy surrounding reported comments made by Hunt regarding women in science.

As of 2019, Arthur was faced with continuing controversy in his role as Provost of UCL, with 94% of the academics present at an informal meeting in 2018 voting no confidence in the college’s governance. Numerous faculty complaints were directed towards an alleged lack of democracy and transparency regarding plans to expand UCL with a new site, "UCL East", inadequate teaching facilities, and a perceived decline in academic standards.

== Research ==
Arthur first developed his interests in the cell and molecular pathogenesis of liver fibrosis on a two-year Fogarty International Travelling Fellowship at the University of California, San Francisco (1988–1990). In 2002, he took up a Fulbright distinguished scholar award to conduct cell biology research at Mount Sinai School of Medicine in New York City.

His contribution to research has been acknowledged with the award of the American Liver Foundation Research Prize (1987) and the Linacre Medal of the Royal College of Physicians, London (1994), a year after becoming a Fellow. He became a Fellow of the Academy of Medical Sciences in 1998 and Fellow of the Royal Society of Arts, Manufactures and Commerce in 2006.

Arthur has been on the editorial boards of several academic journals, including Journal of Hepatology, Comparative Hepatology, Gut and Clinics in Gastroenterology.

== Other roles ==
He has chaired the cell and molecular panel at the Wellcome Trust (2003–2004). He was a member of HEFCE’s Research Assessment Exercise panel for 2001 for hospital-based medicine and HEFCE’s strategic research committee (2003–2005).

Other roles have included membership of the Department of Health’s advisory group on hepatitis (1998–2004) and president of the British Association for the Study of the Liver (2001–2003). He was chair of the board of trustees of the British Liver Trust (2003–2006) and now vice president (2007-). Arthur has also chaired the national steering group for the National Student Survey (2005–2008). Arthur was chair of the Russell Group of universities (2009-2012).

Current roles and public appointments include commissioner for the US/UK Fulbright Commission (2008-), membership of the Council of the Medical Research Council (UK) (2008-) and chair of the Advisory Group for National Specialised Services (NHS) (2010-).

He was a council member of the Council for Industry and Higher Education (CIHE) (2012-2013). Arthur was a board member of Opera North (2006-2013). He was a trustee of Centre for London.

== Personal life ==
He is married to consultant paediatrician, Elizabeth S. McCaughey (married 1979), and they have two daughters (born 1983 and 1985) and one son (born 1987). He enjoys sailing.

Academic offices
Preceded by Alan Wilson	Vice-Chancellor of the University of Leeds; 2004 - 2013	Succeeded by Sir Alan Langlands
