= Derek Roberts =

British academic (1932–2021)

Sir Derek Roberts CBE FRS FREng FInstP

Provost of University College London
- In office 2002–2003

Provost of University College, London
- In office 1989–1999

Personal details
- Born: Derek Harry Roberts; 28 March 1932
- Died: 17 February 2021 (aged 88)

Sir Derek Harry Roberts (28 March 1932 – 17 February 2021) was an English engineer who twice served as provost of University College London (UCL), from 1989 to 1999 and again from 2002 to 2003.

== Engineering ==
Roberts spent much of his professional life in industrial scientific research at Plessey's Caswell research centre, and later at the GEC Hirst Research Centre and as a director of GEC. For his contribution to early semiconductor research, Roberts was elected a Fellow of the Royal Society in 1980 and delivered the Clifford Paterson Lecture the same year. He was elected a Fellow of the Royal Academy of Engineering, also in 1980. In 1986 he presented the Bernard Price Memorial Lecture in South Africa.

== UCL ==
Roberts became the Provost of UCL in 1989. Under his leadership UCL expanded significantly, merging with several institutions including the Institute of Child Health in 1996, the Royal Free Medical School in 1998, and the School of Slavonic and East European Studies in 1999.

Roberts retired in 1999, but returned to UCL in 2002 to act as interim Provost following the resignation of his successor, Christopher Llewellyn Smith. He served until the appointment of Malcolm Grant in August 2003.

Roberts died on 17 February 2021, aged 88.

== Personal life ==
Roberts married Winifred Short in 1958. They have two children.

== Honours and legacy ==
Roberts was appointed a Commander of the Order of the British Empire and in the Queen's Birthday Honours 1995 he was appointed a Knight Bachelor for services to engineering and to education.

In recognition of his contributions to the faculty, UCL's main Engineering building was named the Roberts Building.

Academic offices
Preceded by James Lighthill	Provost of University College London; 1989–1999	Succeeded by Christopher Llewellyn Smith
Preceded by Christopher Llewellyn Smith	Provost of University College London; 2002–2003	Succeeded by Malcolm Grant
