= Department of Pharmacology, University College London =

The Department of Pharmacology at the University College London, the first of its kind in England, was founded in 1905 and remained in existence until 2007.

== Early history ==
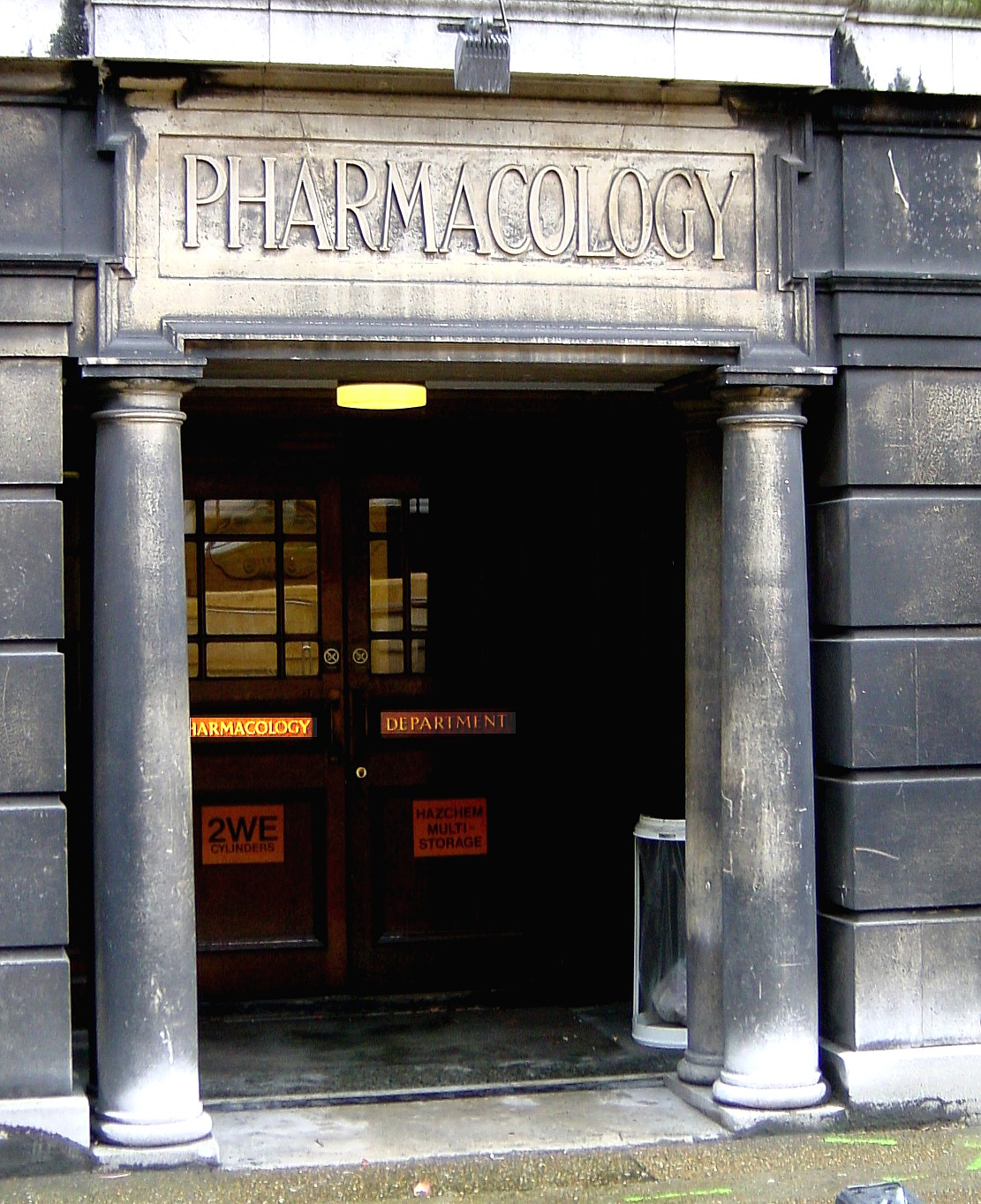
UCL Pharmacology department door, 22 Oct 2002

University College London (UCL) was founded in 1826. It was born in the ferment of radical London in the 1820s and 1830s and was heavily influenced by the Scottish and French Enlightenments. UCL was part of the radical opposition to the hegemony of Oxford and Cambridge. In medicine, UCL was a force in combatting the conservative and religious monopoly of the Royal Colleges of Physicians and Surgeons

Although Edinburgh University was well ahead at the time, UCL had a professor of Materia Medica and Pharmacy, A.T.Thomson, from the start. Later this was renamed as the chair of Materia Medica and Therapeutics. Its best known holder was Sydney Ringer (1878–87), who worked on the isolated beating heart and is renowned for his eponymous salt solution which he designed to maximise the viability of isolated hearts. His textbook 'Handbook of Therapeutics' ran for 13 editions between 1869 and 1897.

In 1905 pharmacology was established as a distinct discipline within basic medical sciences at UCL. It was the first Department of Pharmacology in England.

Most of the people involved in the development of quantitative analysis of drug-receptor interactions worked at some time in UCL's Departments of Pharmacology, or of Physiology or of Biophysics.

== The Department of Pharmacology ==
=== Arthur Robertson Cushny FRS ===
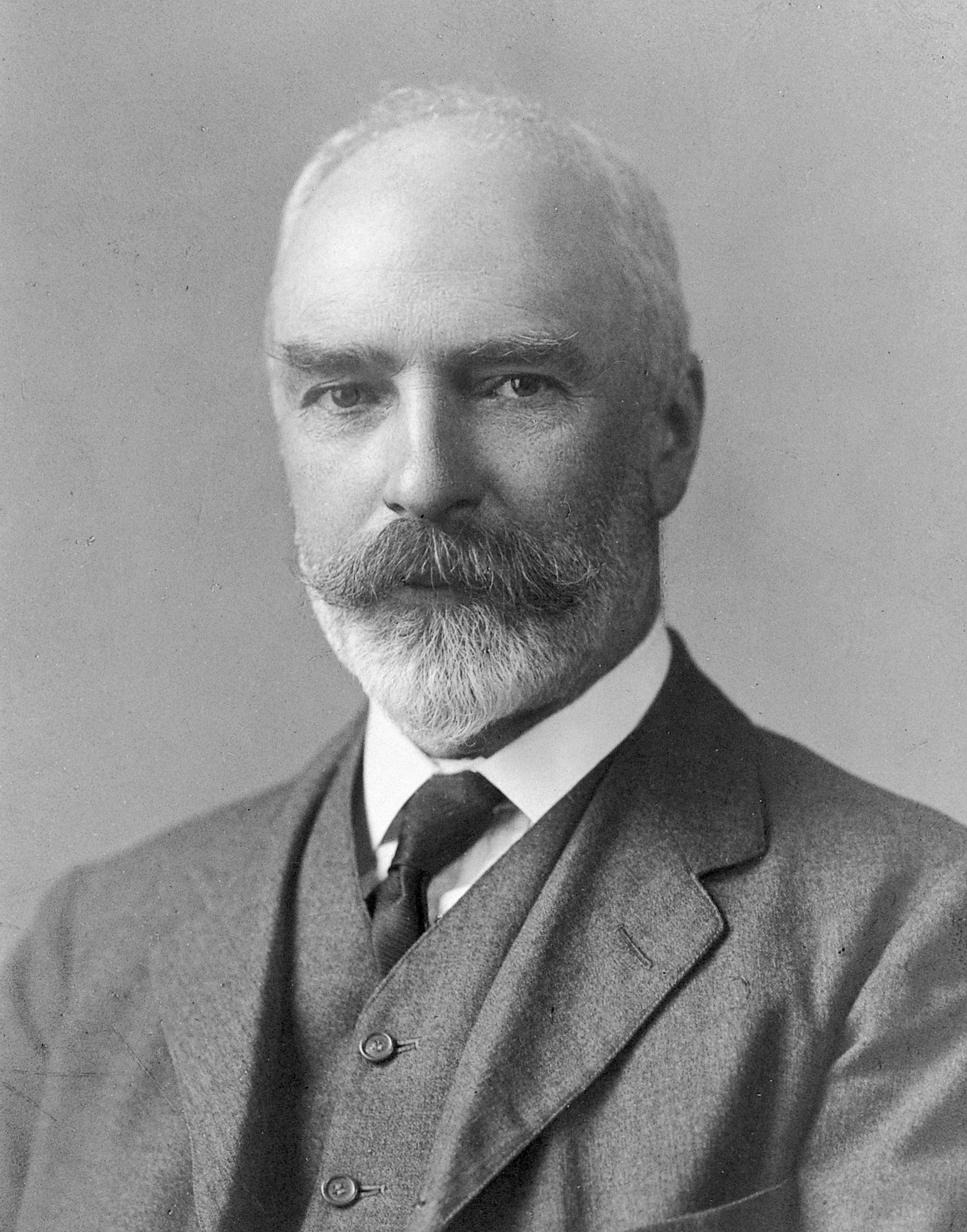
A.R. Cushny

Arthur Cushny (1866–1926) was the first holder of the newly instituted Chair of Pharmacology, from 1905 until 1918. After graduating in medicine from Aberdeen, Cushny had studied in Berne, Würzburg, and Strasbourg, where he became Assistant to the famed Oswald Schmiedeberg. In 1893, at the age of 27, he was appointed Professor of Pharmacology at the University of Michigan, Ann Arbor. Eight years later Cushny came to the chair at UCL where he soon expanded the department from the single room he had been given. He raised the funds for the building which the remnants of the department still occupies.

His main interests were in the heart and kidney. His work on the involvement of calcium in the action of digitalis was prescient. He was interested in optical isomers. Data from an early clinical trial using hyoscine isomers was used by William Sealy Gossett who, under the pseudonym "Student" published in 1908 the first small-sample test of significance, Student's t test. His use of these data has given rise to much discussion. Later reanalysis of the same data by a randomisation tests gave a similar result.

Cushny published a textbook Textbook of Pharmacology and Therapeutics (eighth edition 1924). He introduced the Cushny myograph, an ingenious arrangement of counterbalanced levers that allowed the faithful recording of the rate and force of contraction of the rapidly beating animal heart. It was still in use in practical classes at UCL, and elsewhere, in the 1960s.

Cushny left UCL in 1918, to become Professor of Materia Medica and Pharmacology at Edinburgh. he was succeeded by A.J. Clark.

=== Alfred Joseph Clark FRS ===
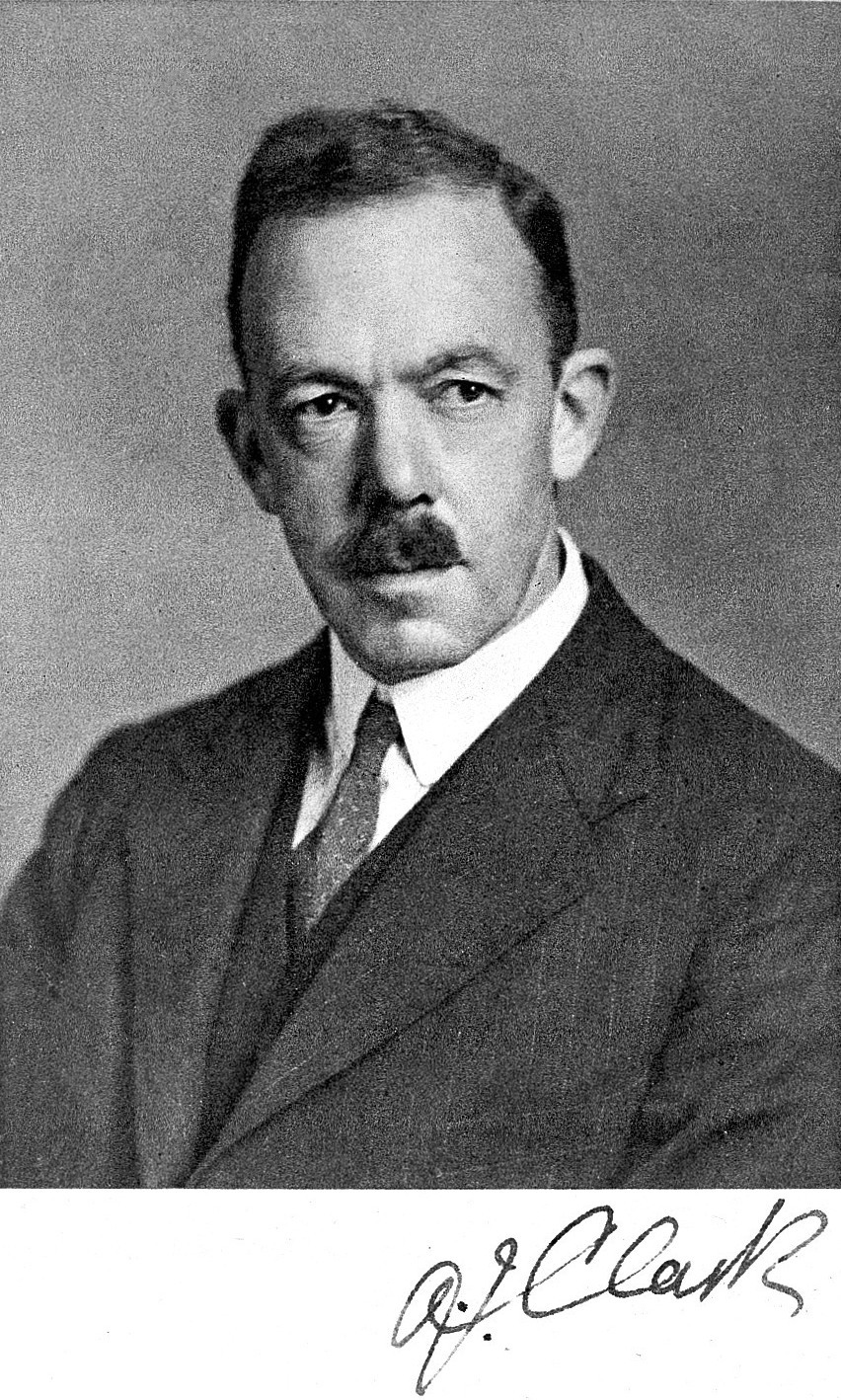
A.J. Clark

A.J. Clark, FRS (1885–1941) held the established Chair of Pharmacology from 1918 to 1926. After qualifying in medicine, and serving as a field medical officer throughout the First World War, Clark had been appointed Professor of Pharmacology at the University of Cape Town where he remained until accepting the Chair of Pharmacology at UCL in 1920. His influence on the subject was profound. The distinguished physiologist and Nobel laureate A.V. Hill (Archibald Hill) had begun the quantitative study of the action of agonists on an isolated tissue (frog skeletal muscle) some years earlier. Clark took this much further and extended it to examine the actions of antagonists. The data he gathered on the exact relationship between agonist concentration and response, and on how this changed in the presence of a competitive antagonist, were published in two classic papers in the Journal of Physiology in 1926. But he failed to work out a method for analysing properly the results of experiments with antagonists: that had to wait for his successor, Heinz Schild.

Nevertheless, Clark was largely responsible for the transition of pharmacology from a descriptive subject to the quantitative science that it is today - this emphasis on quantitative approaches has remained strong throughout the subsequent history of the department. Clark's book The Mode of Action of Drugs on Cells (Williams & Wilkins, 1933) is a classic and the following quotation from it set the tone for the department for many years.

"In the first place, there is no advantage in fitting curves by a formula unless this expresses some possible physico-chemical process, and it is undesirable to employ formulae that imply impossibilities. It is a question of finding a few systems so simple that it is possible to establish with reasonable probability the relation between the quantity of drug and the action produced."

While at UCL Clark wrote the first edition of his textbook Applied Pharmacology in 1923, a book that was to be updated by two of his successors as head of department, first by H.O. Schild and later by H.P. Rang, and is still extant in the form of the widely used textbook Rang & Dale's Pharmacology.

In 1926 Clark followed his predecessor in moving to the University of Edinburgh.

=== E.B.Verney FRS ===
Ernest Basil Verney (1894–1967) succeeded Clark. He held the Chair of Pharmacology from 1926 to 1934. While at UCL Verney discovered the antidiuretic hormone and also the mechanism by which structures in the brain sense minute changes in blood osmotic pressure. Both findings were of profound importance for the understanding of water and electrolyte balance. Verney was also instrumental in arranging for Otto Krayer to come to the department, albeit for only a short period, following Krayer's exclusion from all academic positions in German universities because of his objection to the expulsion of Jewish scientists from their posts. Krayer was later to head the Department of Pharmacology at Harvard with the greatest distinction. In 1934 Verney moved to an academic post at the University of Cambridge where he later became the first Sheild Professor of Pharmacology

=== J.H. Gaddum FRS ===
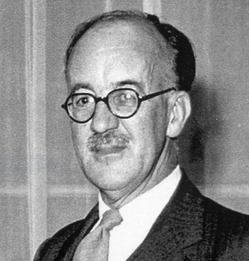
John Henry Gaddum

John Gaddum (1900–1965) held the Chair of Pharmacology from 1935 to 1938. Like A.J. Clark, he had a profound interest in quantitative methods.

He extended A.J. Clark's work on competitive antagonism, and applied the law of mass action to describe the relationship (the Gaddum equation) between receptor occupancy and the concentrations of an agonist and a competitive antagonist at equilibrium with the receptors in a tissue. The theory for two or more competing ligands had been known since Michaelis & Menten (1914), but Gaddum was the first to apply it in a pharmacological context). Like Clark before him, Gaddum failed to spot how to use the theory to estimate equilibrium constants.

Gaddum was also a master of bioassay which was then the preferred, and usually the only, way to determine the concentrations of biologically active molecules such as labile neurotransmitters and the neuropeptides.

=== F.R. Winton ===
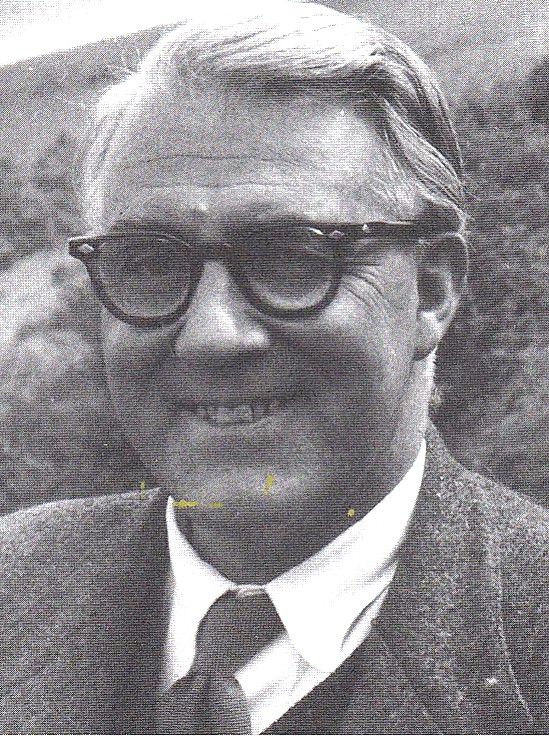
Frank R. Winton

Frank Winton (1894–1985) held the Chair of Pharmacology from 1938 to 1961. His main scientific interest was in the control of blood flow to the kidney. Winton ran the department through the difficult war years when the Medical School was evacuated to Leatherhead, Surrey.

He appointed the first two female academics in the department. Mary Lockett (1911–1982) was a lecturer in the department from 1945–1950. Hannah Steinberg arrived in the UK from Vienna on a Kindertransport train while still a schoolgirl, and she eventually became Professor of Psychopharmacology.

Winton also worked hard and successfully to ensure that pharmacology had an appropriate place in the preclinical curriculum. He oversaw the extension of the department, including the Pharmacology Lecture Theatre (now the Schild Theatre).

He was the author, with Leonard Bayliss, of a widely used textbook Human Physiology, first published in 1932. The 6th edition, 1968 was written by Olof J.C. Lippold and F.R Winton

=== H.O. Schild FRS ===
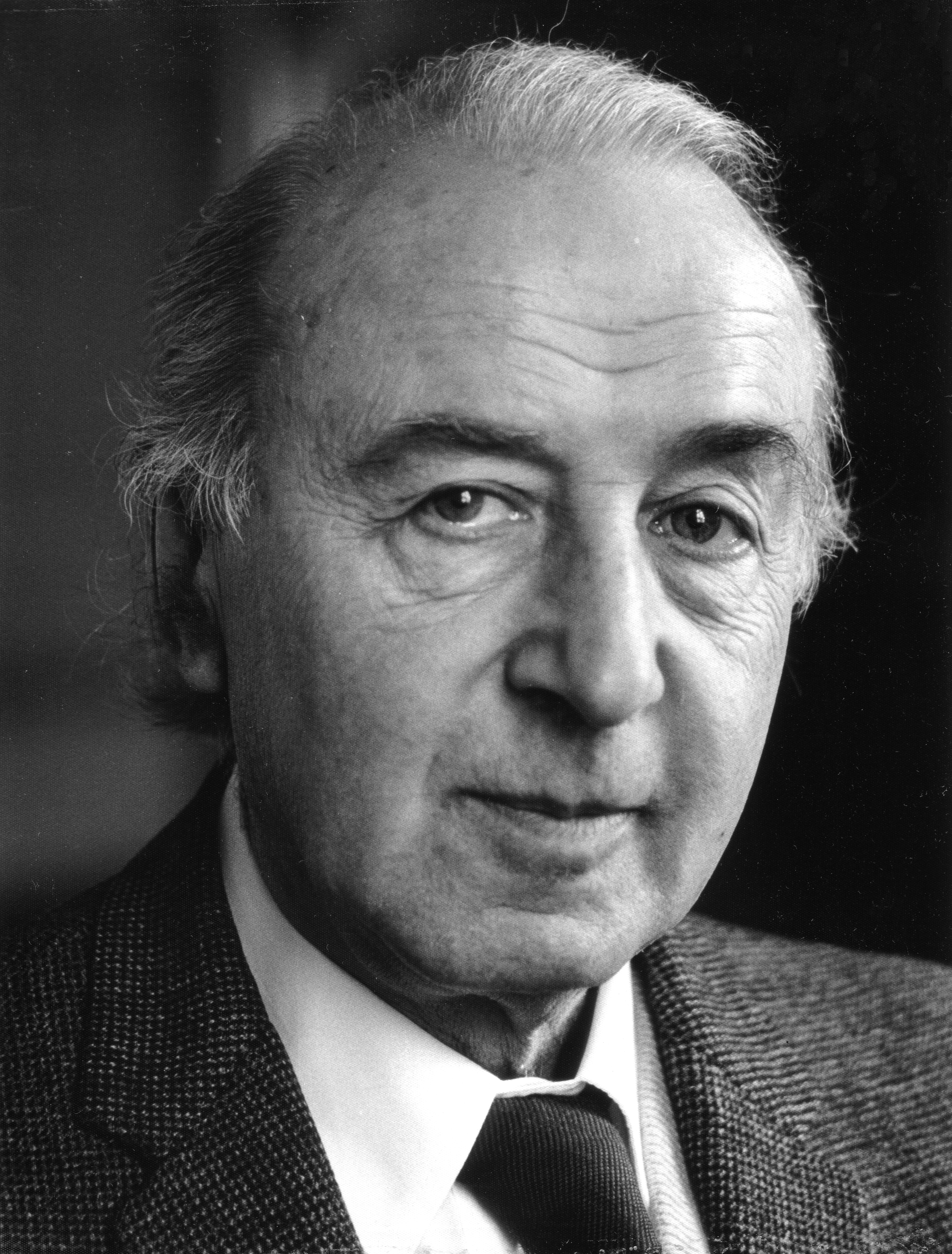
Heinz Otto Schild (1908-1984)

Heinz Otto Schild (1906–1984) held the Chair of Pharmacology from 1961 to 1973.

He was born in Fiume (now Rijeka, Croatia), in 1908, when it was part of the Austro-Hungarian empire. He qualified in medicine in Munich and then worked with Straub, the leading German pharmacologist of the time. By good fortune, Schild had been accepted as a visiting worker by Sir Henry Dale and was in England when the National Socialists came to power in Germany. He decided to stay in Britain and became an assistant in the Department of Pharmacology in Edinburgh, then headed by A.J. Clark. When J. H. Gaddum was appointed to the chair at UCL, he invited Schild to join him as a Demonstrator. So began his long association with UCL, interrupted only by his bizarre internment on the Isle of Man as an 'enemy alien' at the outbreak of the Second World War. Following his release (greatly aided by F.R Winton's and Sir Henry Dale's appeals to the Home Office) he returned to his work in the department, then based in Leatherhead, and in 1961 became Winton's successor as Head of Department and Professor of Pharmacology.

Schild made major contributions to receptor pharmacology, to the understanding of the mechanism of histamine release and to bioassay. Like Gaddum and Clark, he used quantitative approaches whenever possible. His name is immortalised by the Schild equation. He built on the work of Clark and Gaddum on competitive antagonism, by realising that the null method was key to extraction of physical equilibrium constants from simple functional experiments. Rather than looking at the depression by antagonist of the response to a fixed agonist concentration, he measured the dose-ratio, the factor by which the agonist concentration had to be increased in order to restore a given response in the presence of the antagonist. By measuring the dose-ratio as a function of antagonist, it was possible to estimate the dissociation equilibrium constant for the combination of the antagonist with its receptor. Crucially the estimate is not dependent on the nature of the agonist. Although Schild's derivation used the simplest possible model, it was subsequently shown that his equation is valid under much more general conditions.

A.J. Clark's textbook was continued by Schild as Clark's Applied Pharmacology by Wilson & Schild.

Heinz Schild was a head of department. He appointed the third female member of academic staff, Dr M. Maureen Dale, a co-author of Rang & Dales Pharmacology. He oversaw the planning and introduction of a 3 year B.Sc. course in Pharmacology which began in 1967 and continues to this day. Medical students were able to enter its final year and Schild was delighted that many took this opportunity.

=== J.W.Black FRS ===
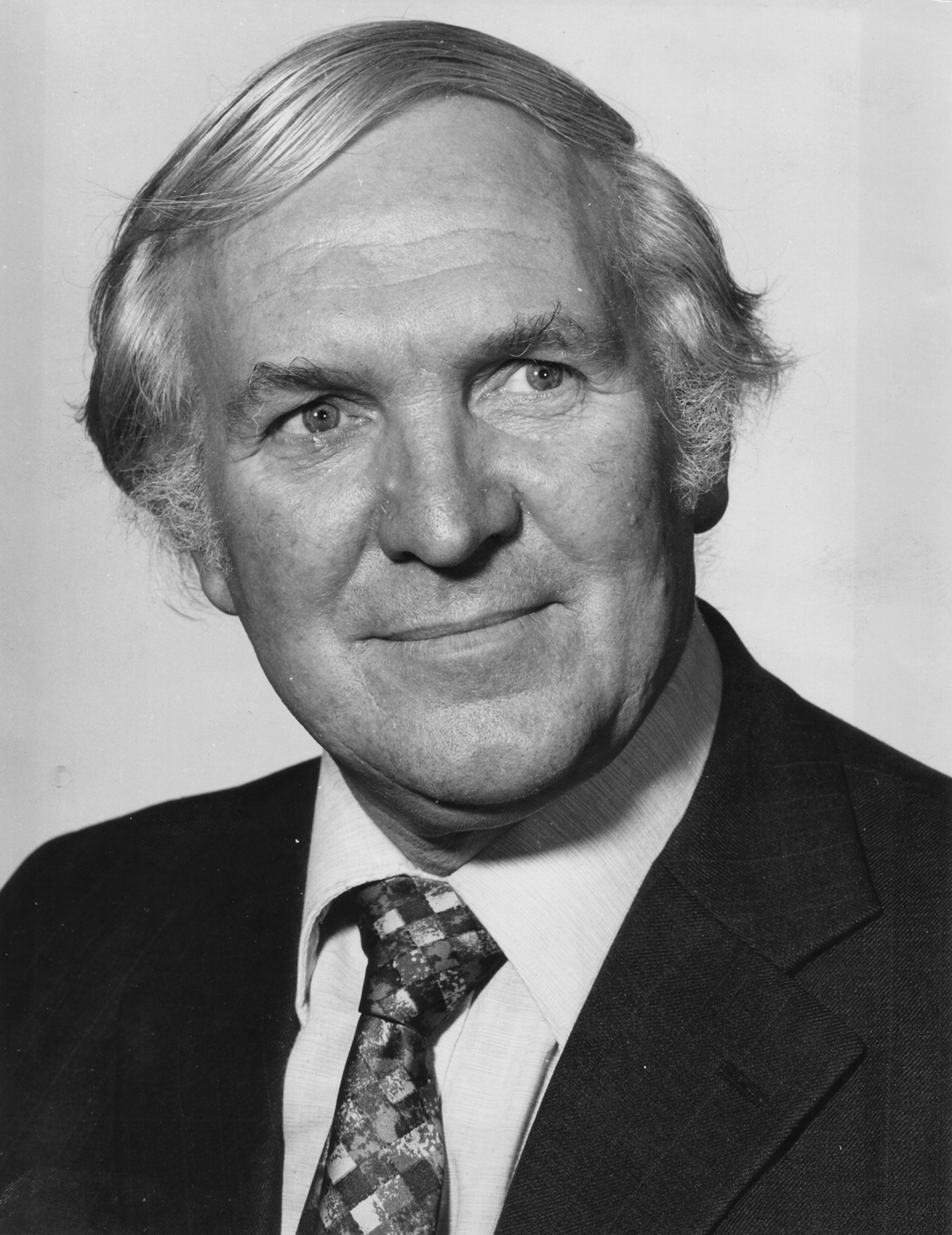
Sir James W. Black (1924-2010)

Sir James Whyte Black OM FRS FRSE FRCP (1924–2010) held the Chair of Pharmacology from 1973 to 1978.

Jim Black and Heinz Schild knew each other well because Schild had acted as a consultant to the then Smith, Kline & French company during the time when Black was leading the team that developed the histamine receptor antagonists, H_{2} antagonists, which reduce secretion of gastric acid and which, at the time, transformed the treatment of gastric ulcers. Schild's methods for quantitative methods for analysis of drug antagonists were crucial for this work.

Black introduced many changes to teaching in the department. One of the most important was the introduction of a BSc course in Medicinal Chemistry. His long experience in the pharmaceutical industry had convinced him that organic and physical chemists working on drug development with pharmacologists and biochemists would benefit greatly from a substantial knowledge of biology, certainly enough to allow them to understand and assess the kinds of measurements that their biological colleagues undertook. Though the students were based in the Department of Chemistry, they took also courses in physiology and pharmacology, particularly its molecular aspects. This BSc course, like that in Pharmacology, also flourished and continues today. Another important change was a sharp reduction in the number of experiments with animal tissues undertaken by medical students during their course in pharmacology. At the same time, the emphasis on the importance of observations on human subjects was increased.

Black's appointment coincided with the onset of the straitened circumstances that all UK universities were to experience and that have continued in one form or another ever since. The changes he made helped the department to adjust to these harder times. To the regret of his Departmental staff, Black found that only the pharmaceutical industry could provide the facilities needed for the work he wished to pursue, and in 1978 he left to join the Wellcome Foundation.

Black was knighted in 1981 and in 1988 he got the Nobel Prize in Physiology or Medicine along with Gertrude B. Elion and George H. Hitchings for their work on drug development.

=== H.P.Rang FRS ===
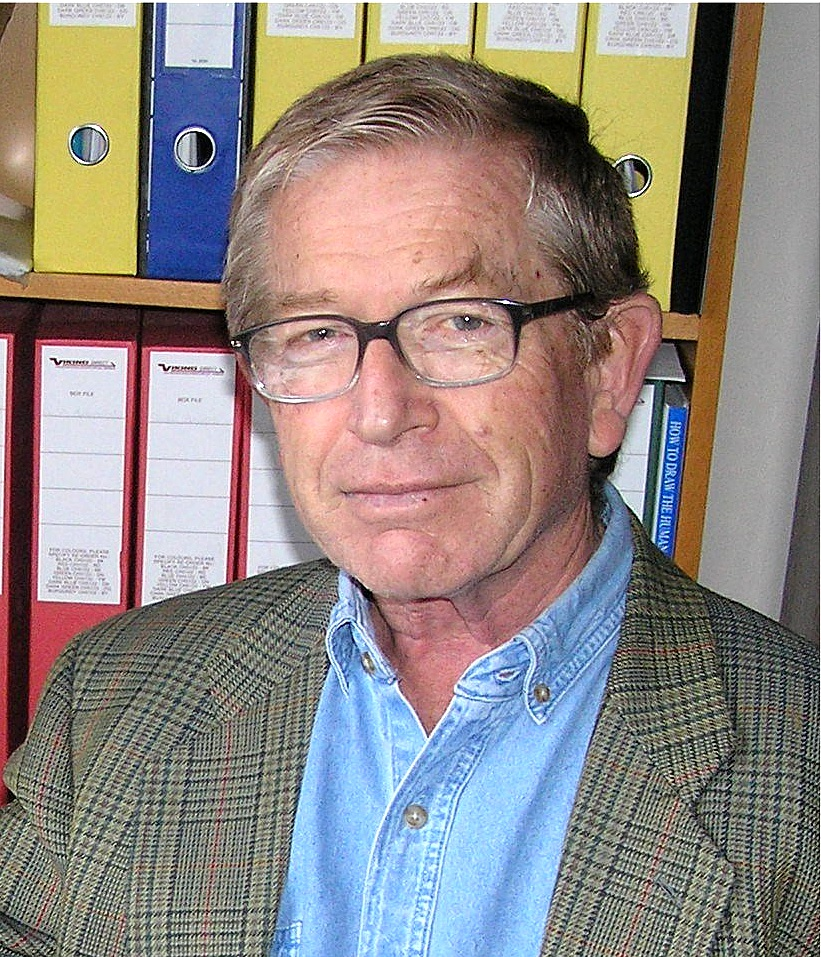
Humphrey Rang

Humphrey Rang (born 1936) held the Chair of Pharmacology from 1979 to 1983.

Rang qualified in medicine at UCL and had worked in H.O.Schild's laboratory while a medical student. He was the author of the first successful ligand-binding experiment of the modern era. This was based on his PhD work in Oxford, under William D.M. Paton. Rang had previously been the Professor of Pharmacology at Southampton and at St. George's Hospital Medical School. He brought with him David Colquhoun who was also returning to the department, having been appointed in 1964 as an assistant lecturer by H.O. Schild. These appointments greatly strengthened the interests and achievements of the department in fundamental aspects of pharmacology, particularly the study of ion channels and receptors.

In collaboration with M. Maureen Dale (also appointed during Schild's Headship), Rang prepared the first edition of Pharmacology, the successor to Wilson & Schild's Applied Pharmacology.

In 1983 Rang was offered and accepted the Directorship of the Sandoz Institute of Medical Research, a division of Sandoz, then an independent pharmaceutical company. The new Institute was located in UCL and developed a close relationship with the department, both in teaching, to which members of the Institute contributed, and in research.

=== After 1983 ===
==== The heads of department since 1983. ====
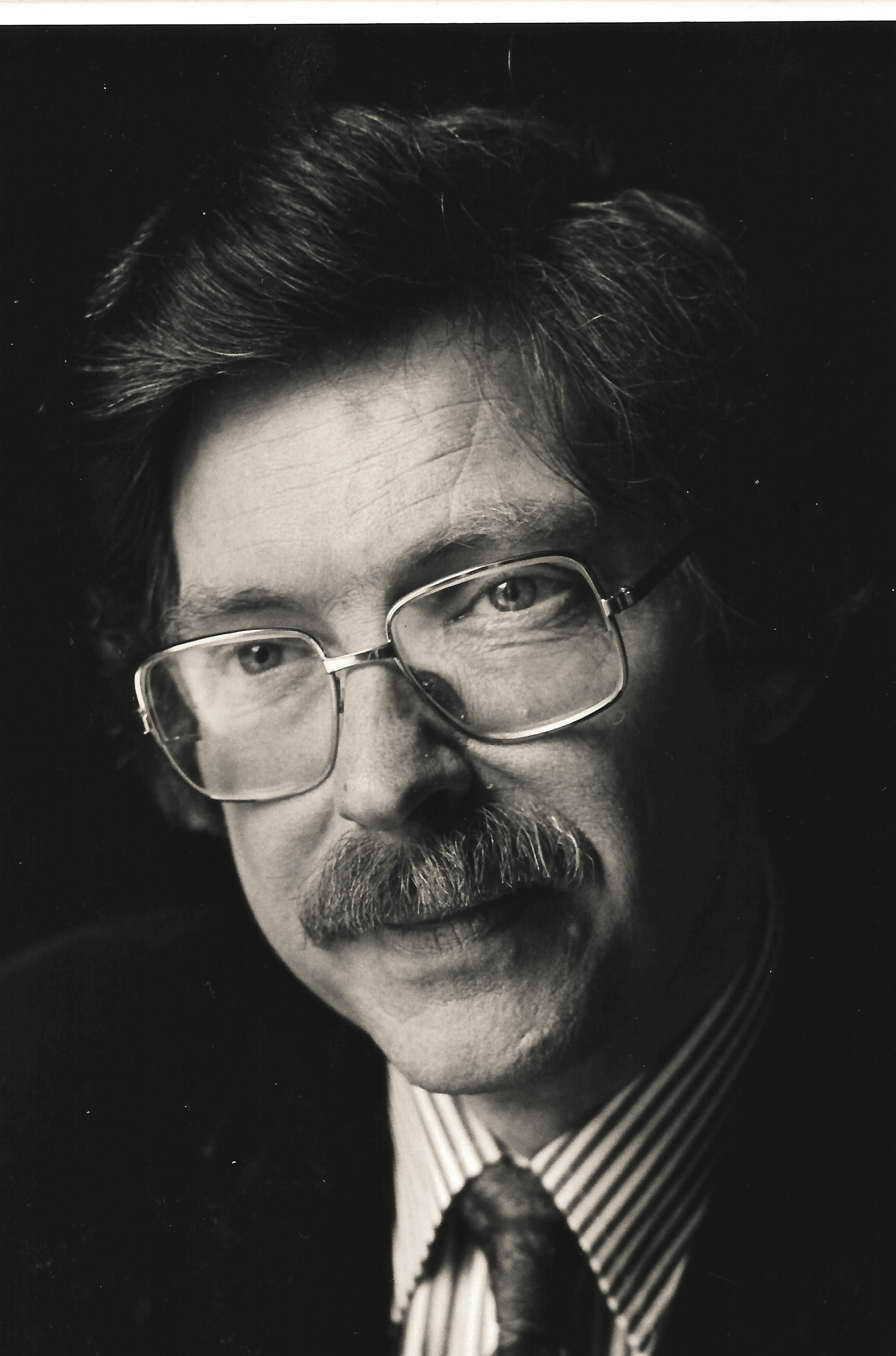
Donald H. Jenkinson (1983 - 1987)

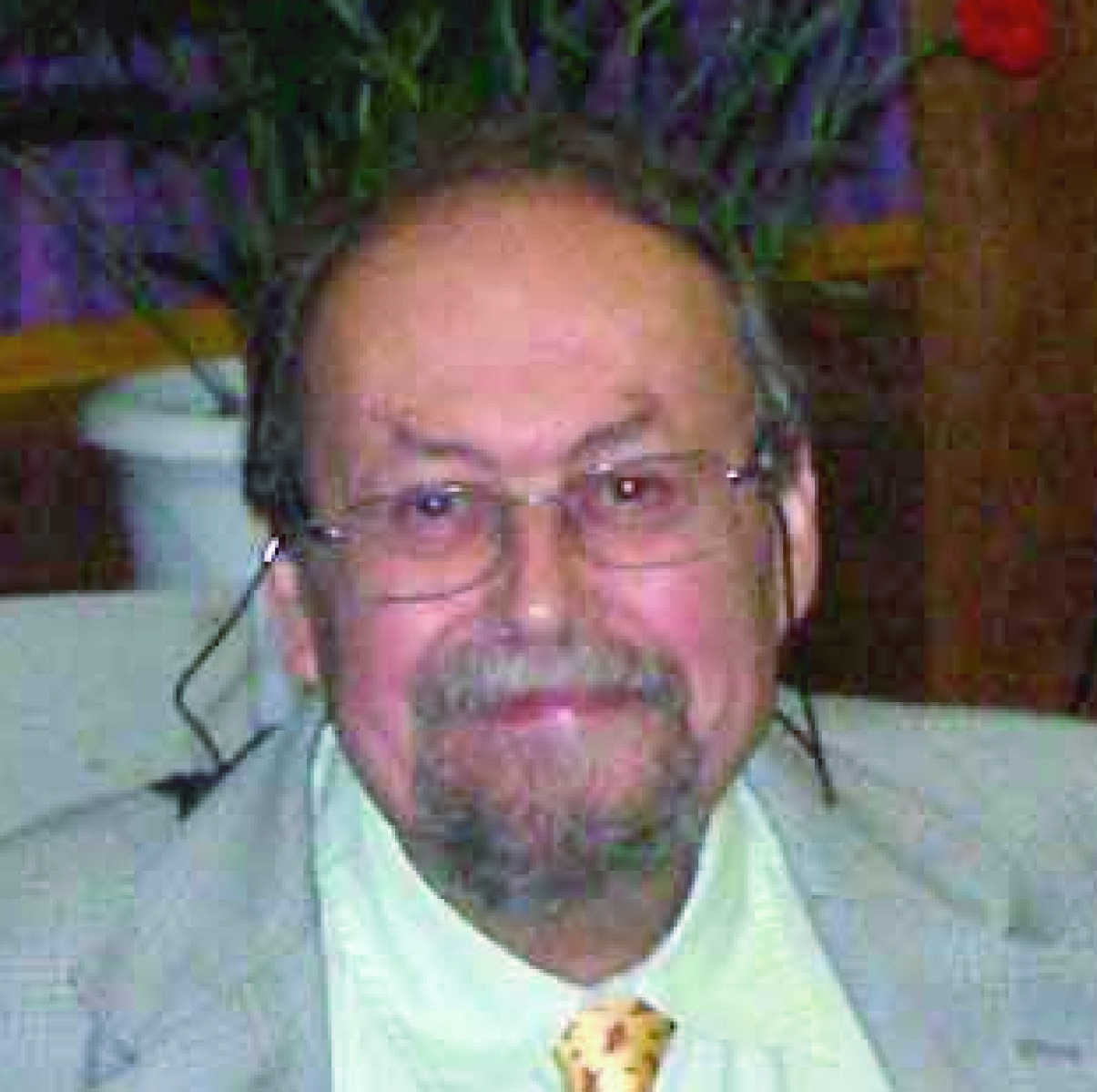
David A. Brown (1987 - 2002) (Astor Chair of pharmacology)

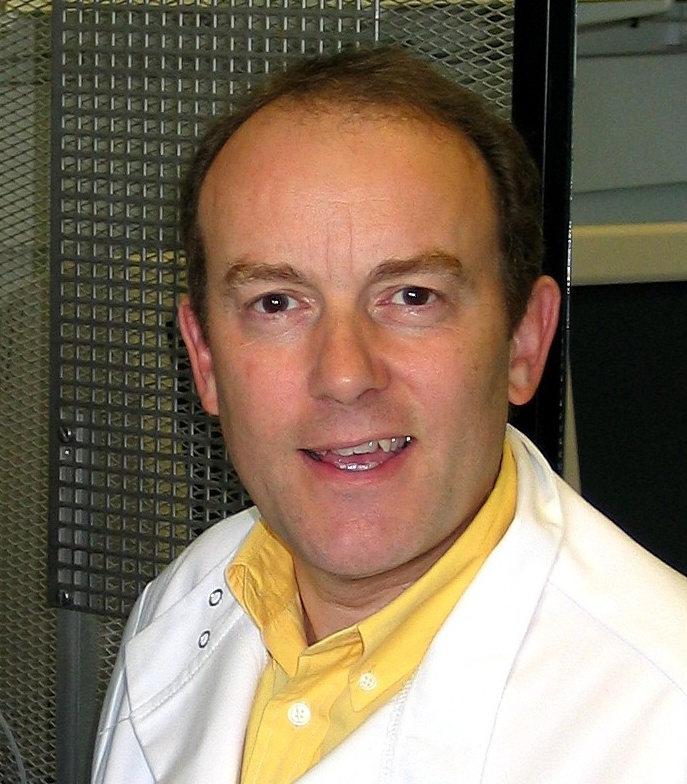
Trevor G. Smart (2002 - 2021) (Schild Chair of pharmacology)

After Rang's resignation, the Chair of Pharmacology became vacant. The head of department from 1983 to 1987 was Donald.H Jenkinson He had done his PhD under Bernard Katz. in UCL's famous Department of Biophysics, and was yet another member of staff who had been invited to join the Department by Heinz Schild. During his tenure the Middlesex Hospital Medical School was merged with UCL's, including the two Departments of Pharmacology.

During the 1980s the traditional role of heads of department was replaced by rotating headships that were no longer associated necessarily with an established chair. Established chairs were, de facto, abolished as part of the move to corporatise universities.

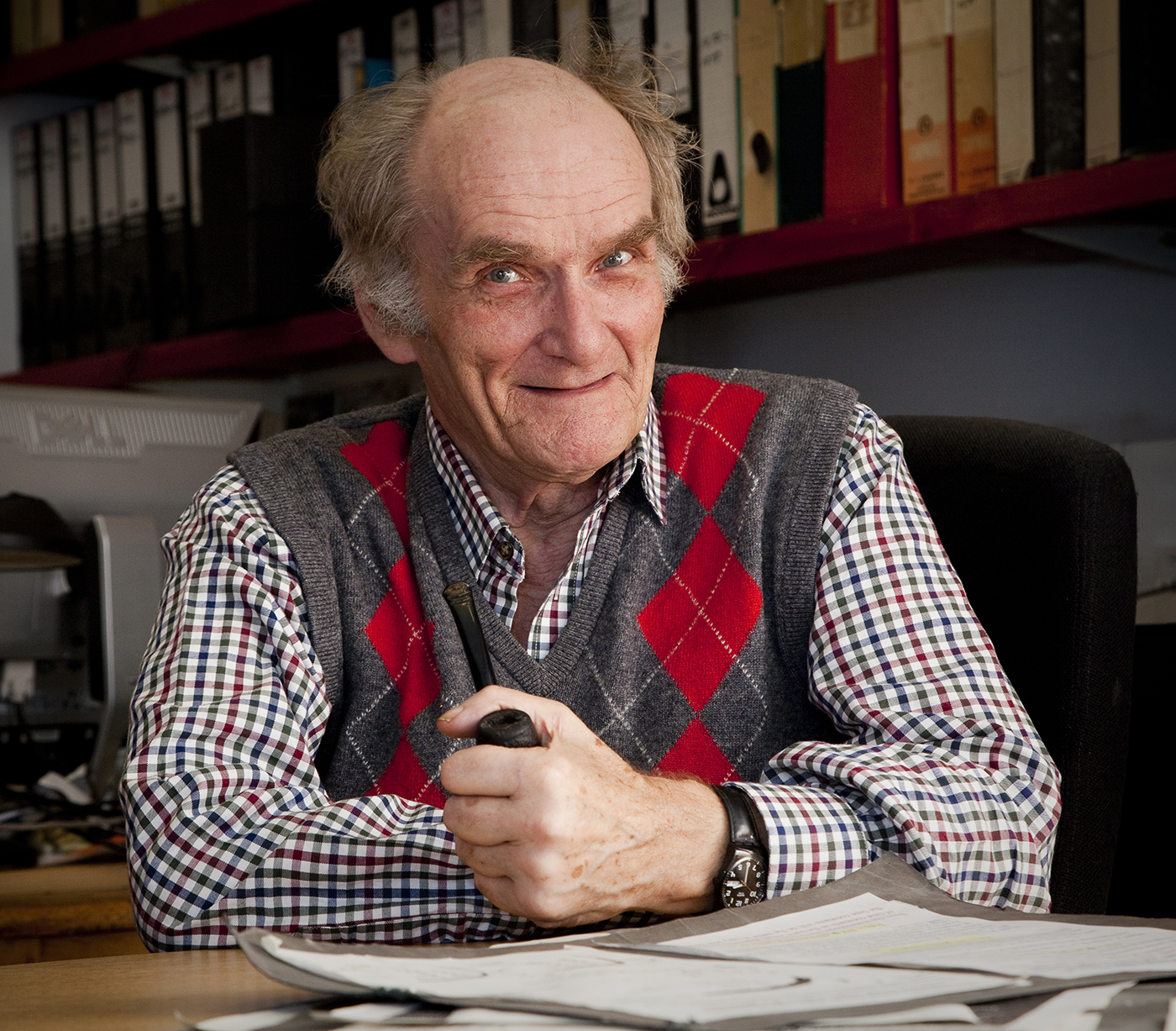
David Colquhoun

David Colquhoun FRS was appointed to the established chair in 1985. It was subsequently dubbed the A.J. Clark chair, in honour of Clark's role in the establishment of quantitative pharmacology. His work, with statistician Alan Hawkes and Bert Sakmann (Nobel prize 1991) established the department as the world leader in the theory and experiment of single ion channels. After retiring from the A.J.Clark chair in 2004, he worked on the misinterpretation of p values and its contribution to the irreproducibility that has come to light in some areas of science.

D. A. Brown FRS (1936 - 2023) was appointed in 1987 as head of department (he had previously held the same position at the School of Pharmacy). In 1987, the merger with the Middlesex Hospital Medical School was completed and David Brown inherited the title Astor Chair of Pharmacology from Professor F Hobbiger who had held that title at the Middlesex.

Brown's appointment was intended initially to be the start of a 5-year rotating headship, but when Colquhoun's turn became due, he decided that the job of Head of department would not allow enough time to do the algebra and program development with which he was involved. Donald Jenkinson likewise declined to take another turn. Luckily David Brown agreed to continue and he remained head of department until 2002. His tenure saw a second merger, this time with the Department of Pharmacology at the Royal Free Medical School, headed by Professor Annette Dolphin, FRS. David Brown is renowned for his discovery of the acetylcholine (muscarinic)-sensitive potassium channel (M channel).

The Wellcome Lab for Molecular Pharmacology The growing importance of molecular biology led Brown & Colquhoun to apply to the Wellcome Trust in 1990. They funded the building of the Lab for Molecular Pharmacology which Colquhoun directed until his retirement in 2004.

Trevor G. Smart became Head of department in 2002, with the title of Schild Chair of Pharmacology. He also works in the ion channel field. After the demise of the department in 2007. Smart became head of the new Research Department of Neuroscience, Physiology and Pharmacology.

Stephanie Schorge. In 2021, Professor Schorge succeeded Trevor Smart as head of the Research Department of Neuroscience, Physiology and Pharmacology. She is the first female head of pharmacology since 1905.

Stuart Cull-Candy FRS. Stuart G. Cull-Candy works on glutamate-activated ion channels. He joined the Department from UCL's Department of Biophysics and holds the Gaddum Chair of Pharmacology.

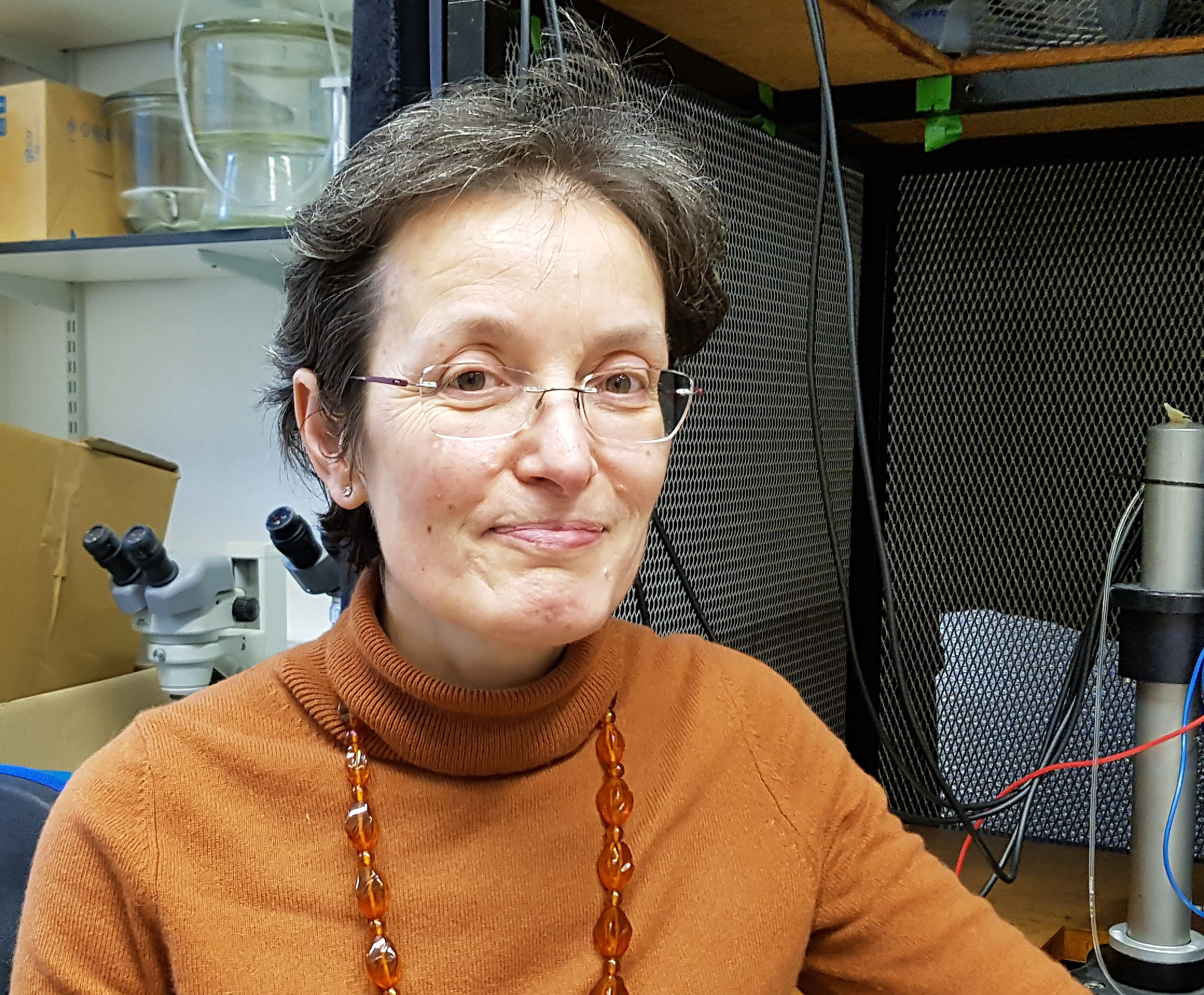
Lucia Sivilotti (A.J. Clark Chair of Pharmacology)

Lucia Sivilotti was appointed to the A.J. Clark chair in 2014. She has run the UCL Single Ion Channel group after Colquhoun's retirement in 2004. She continued and greatly extended the work in the field of single channel kinetics. She owns the web site OneMol where the group's analysis programs and publications can be downloaded. The association of the A.J. Clark chair with quantitative work on receptors has thus continued to the present day.

The first of the nationwide Research Assessment Exercises took place in 1986. The UCL Department headed the list. It continued to be rated as the top Department of Pharmacology in each of the four research assessments that followed in 1989, 1992, 1996 and 2002. But this performance was not enough to save the department.

=== The end of the Department of Pharmacology ===
In 2004, Malcolm Grant became provost of UCL. He commissioned external reports on the reorganisation of the college. The distinguished vice-president of the University of Manchester, Richard Alan North FRS, was asked to assess several options for the reorganisation of the Faculty of Life Sciences. One was to create large Research Departments, including one of Neuroscience, Physiology and Pharmacology, from the existing academic Departments. Professor North's only comment on the options was that the proposed "research departments in Life Sciences were too big". Grant accepted the conclusions except for the part about the size of departments.

On 24 May 2007 Grant persuaded the Academic Board to authorise him to act on its behalf and on 13 June 2007 the Department of Pharmacology was disestablished, after a century of distinction and innovation.

The academic staff at the time had three main concerns about the proposals. (a) The separation of teaching from research is bad, especially for teaching: the fact that a degree is offered in, for example, Pharmacology without a Pharmacology department to support it, means that there is no guarantee that there will be staff qualified or fully motivated to teach it. Moreover, the collegiality that comes from designing and providing a first-rate degree course is lost. (b) The size of the merged department of Neurosciences, Physiology and Pharmacology means less interaction between staff, and less collegiate spirit. (c) The changes created two extra levels of administration, so that now five levels existed between academics and the provost.

Staff were told at the time that the new organisation would be rolled out to other Faculties across UCL, though this has not happened. David Colquhoun has kept a personal diary of the process on his blog: In Memoriam Department of Pharmacology, UCL 1905 – 2007. On the positive side, UCL's current provost, Michael Arthur, has put much emphasis on the quality of teaching, and maintaining its connections with research.

As of 2019, UCL still offers pharmacology degrees, though within the now merged Neuroscience, Physiology and Pharmacology department.

A history of the combined department appears on UCL's web site.
