= David Colquhoun =

British pharmacologist (born 1936)

David Colquhoun FRS MAE
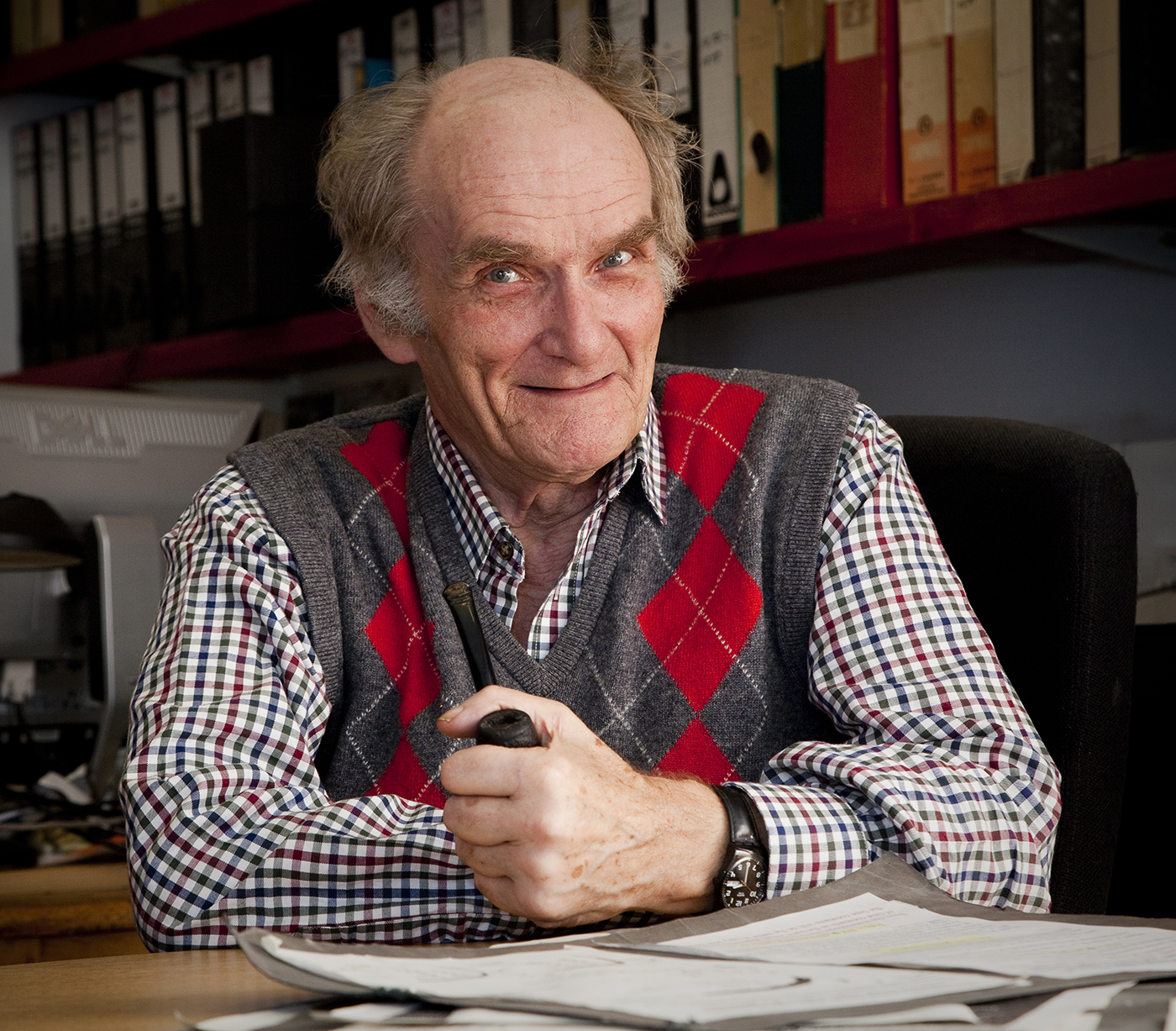
- David Colquhoun in 2013
- Born: 19 July 1936 (age 90); Birkenhead, Cheshire, England
- Education: University of Leeds (BSc); University of Edinburgh (PhD)
- Known for: Single Ion channels; Criticism of pseudo-science; Statistics
- Awards: Humboldt Prize (1990)
- Scientific career
- Fields: Pharmacology; Biophysics; Stochastic processes; Markov processes
- Workplaces: Yale University; University of Southampton; University College London
- Thesis: The characterisation and adsorption of sensitising antibodies (1965)
- Doctoral advisor: W.L.M. Perry; W.E. Brocklehurst
- Website: onemol.org.uk; dcscience.net

David Colquhoun FRS MAE (born 19 July 1936) is a British pharmacologist at University College London (UCL). He has contributed to the general theory of receptor and synaptic mechanisms, and in particular the theory and practice of single ion channel function. He held the A.J. Clark chair of Pharmacology at UCL from 1985 to 2004, and was the Hon. Director of the Wellcome Laboratory for Molecular Pharmacology. He was elected a Fellow of the Royal Society (FRS) in 1985 and an honorary fellow of UCL in 2004. Colquhoun runs the website DC's Improbable Science, which is critical of pseudoscience, particularly alternative medicine, and managerialism.

== Early life and education ==
Colquhoun was born on 19 July 1936 in Birkenhead, UK. He was educated at Birkenhead School and Liverpool Technical College. After working unhappily as an apprentice pharmacist, he was motivated to go into research. He obtained a BSc degree from the University of Leeds with a specialisation in pharmacology, and went on to complete a PhD degree at the University of Edinburgh where he studied the binding of immunoglobulins to lung tissue. His supervisors were Walter Perry and W.E. Brocklehurst. During his education, Colquhoun developed an interest in statistics and random processes, which would influence his research in years to come.

Upon completion of his PhD degree, Colquhoun conducted further research (largely unsuccessful) on immunological problems at UCL from 1964 to 1969. During this time he published a book on statistics. Following this, he completed stints at Yale University, at the University of Southampton and at St. George's University School of Medicine. He returned to the pharmacology department at UCL in 1979, where he has remained since. In 2007, Malcolm Grant brought an end to the department, ending its eminent 102-year history (see Department of Pharmacology at University College London, 1905–2007).

== Scientific career ==
Colquhoun researched the nature of the molecular interactions that cause single ion channels to open and shut, and what it is that controls the speed of synaptic events. The invention and successful application of the patch clamp technique by Erwin Neher and Bert Sakmann allowed the individual openings and closings of single ion channels to be observed and recorded. However, experimentally observed recordings are random in nature. In a lifelong collaboration with the statistician Alan G. Hawkes (1938–2023), Colquhoun developed a statistical method to interpret the data and test putative quantitative mechanisms for how ion channels function.

He and Lucia Sivilotti run a website, OneMol.org.uk, which gives information about UCL's work on single ion channels and on statistical inference.

=== Work with single ion channels ===
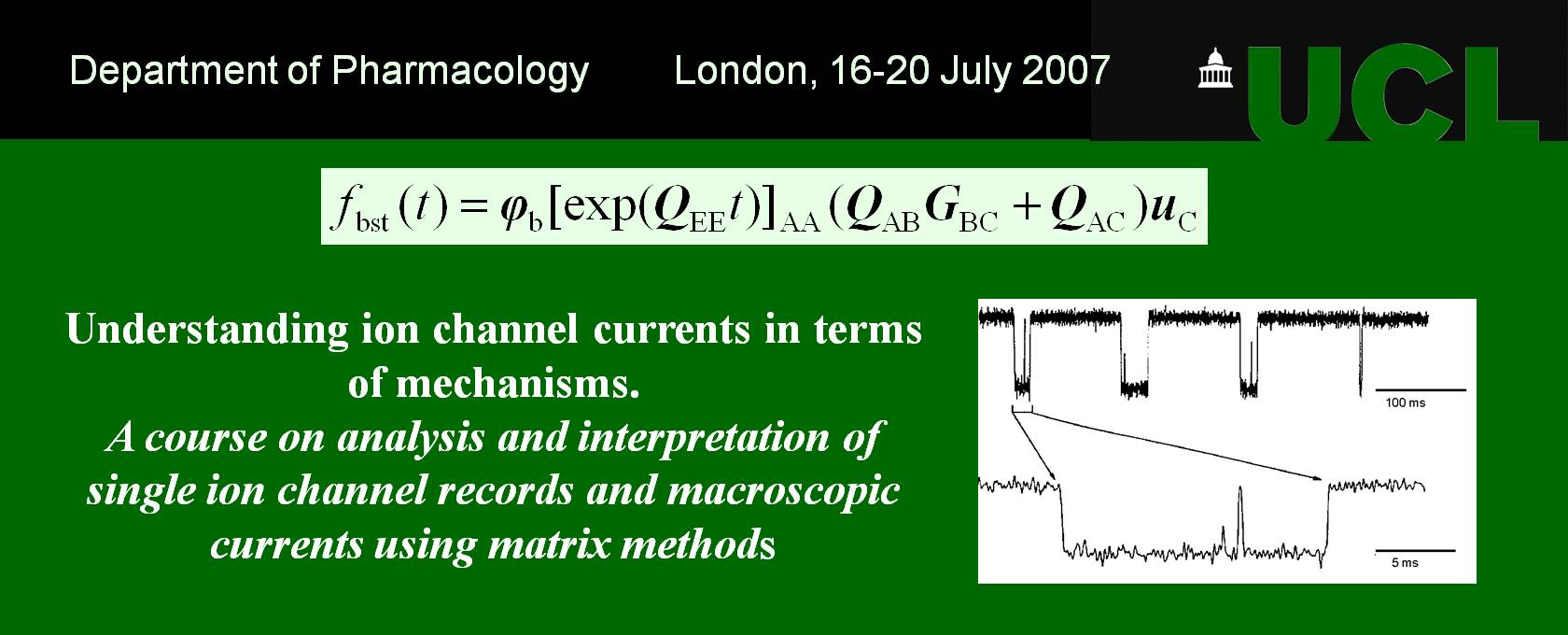
Course mug design for the Department of Pharmacology at UCL

In 1977 Colquhoun and Hawkes predicted that ion channel openings would be expected to occur in brief bursts rather than as single openings, and this prediction was verified in experiments with Bert Sakmann, in Göttingen and London (1981). This work led to the first solution of the classical pharmacological problem of measuring separately the affinity and efficacy of an agonist. In the context of ion channels, this problem is also known as the binding/gating problem. This problem remains unsolved for G protein-coupled receptors, because it was shown in 1987 that the classical methods for determining affinity and efficacy were based on a misapprehension.

The 1985 paper was later nominated as a "classic" by The Journal of Physiology. In 1982 Colquhoun & Hawkes published a paper on the theory of bursts (and clusters of bursts) which gave a general expression for the distribution of the burst length (shown here on the design for a mug for those who attend a course designed to teach the mathematics needed for the equation).

It was clear that the burst length was what controlled the decay rate of synaptic currents, though the formal relationship was not derived until 1998.

=== Missed short events ===
Although the general theory of single channel behaviour was completed in 1982, it could not be used in practice for fitting mechanisms to data, because the recording apparatus is incapable of detecting events shorter than, at best, about 20 microseconds. The effect of missing short shuttings is to make openings appear to be longer than they really are (and likewise for shuttings). To use the method of maximum likelihood it was essential to derive the distribution of the length of what is actually seen, apparent open times and apparent shut times. Although the Laplace transform of these distributions was known, it was thought that they were not invertible until Hawkes and Jalali found an exact solution in 1990. The exact solution was a piecewise expression that got progressively more complicated as the length of the opening (or shutting) increased. The solution became usable in practice after Hawkes and Jalali discovered an elegant asymptotic solution in 1992. The application of the exact solution to joint and conditional distributions in 1996 opened the door to maximum likelihood fitting, which was implemented in a computer program, HJCFIT, which has been the basis of subsequent experimental work. The distributions of apparent open and shut times are often referred to as HJC distributions (for Hawkes, Jalali, Colquhoun).

=== Intermediate shut states ===
All the early work was based on mechanisms that were essentially generalisations of the simple scheme proposed by del Castillo & Katz in 1957, in which the receptor existed in only two conformations, open and shut. It was only when the glycine receptor was investigated that it was realised that it was possible to detect an intermediate shut state (dubbed the "flipped" conformation), between the resting conformation and the open state. Subsequently, it was discovered that this extra "flipped" conformation was detectable too in the nicotinic acetylcholine receptor. Lape et al. (2008) found that partial agonists were partial, not, as had been supposed since 1957, because of a deficiency in the open reaction itself, but because of a deficiency at an earlier stage, a reluctance to move from the resting conformation to the intermediate shut state that precedes opening. The actual shut-open conformation change turned out to be much the same for partial agonists as it was for full agonists. In the original formulation the flipping reaction was supposed to be a concerted transition. The essentials of this new mechanism were confirmed by Mukhtasimova et al. (2009), who generalised it to the case where the subunits can flip independently.

=== Statistical inference ===
After retiring from single ion channel work, Colquhoun maintained an interest in statistical inference. His 2014 paper, An investigation of the false discovery rate and the misinterpretation of p-values, contributed to the p-value debate, and to the discussion of reproducibility in science. This paper has been followed by others which have explored the basis of inductive inference, and which have investigated in more depth the alternatives to using p values. The hazards of reliance on p-values was emphasised in by pointing out that even observation of p = 0.001 was not necessarily strong evidence against the null hypothesis. Despite the fact that the likelihood ratio in favour of the alternative hypothesis over the null is close to 100, if the hypothesis was implausible, with a prior probability of a real effect being 0.1, even the observation of p = 0.001 would have a false positive risk of 8 percent. It would not even reach the 5 percent level. It was recommended that the terms "significant" and "non-significant" should not be used. P values and confidence intervals should still be specified, but they should be accompanied by and indication of the false positive risk. It was suggested that the best way to do this is to calculate the prior probability that would be necessary to believe in order to achieve a false positive risk of, say, 5%. Or, perhaps more simply, the p value could be supplemented by the minimum false positive risk, FPR_{50}, -that calculated for a prior probability of 0.5. Although this would be safe only for plausible hypotheses, it would be a great improvement on giving on p values and confidence intervals. The calculations can be done with R scripts that are provided, or, more simply, with a web calculator.

== Criticism of scientific fraud, alternative medicine and managerialism ==
Colquhoun has been an outspoken critic of pseudoscience and scientific fraud for many years. He has written extensively on the topic, including articles and letters in Nature and The Guardian. He is particularly critical of alternative medicine, and of the decision of a number of UK universities to offer science degrees incorporating courses in complementary and alternative medicine such as homoeopathy and acupuncture, stating that they are "anti-science" and that "universities that run them should be ashamed of themselves".

His interest in statistical inference extends to methods that are used to assess and manage science, and critical assessment of research "metrics". In December 2009, Colquhoun won a Freedom of Information judgement, after a three-year campaign, requiring the University of Central Lancashire to release details of their BSc course in homoeopathy.

=== DC's Improbable Science website ===
Colquhoun created his personal website, DC's Improbable Science, devoted to criticism of pseudoscience, in 2001. It has a particular focus on alternative medicine (AM), including such practices as homoeopathy, Traditional Chinese medicine, herbal medicine, and others, calling them "pure gobbledygook". In addition to his outspoken disapproval of AM in academia, Colquhoun frequently speaks out on his website against misrepresentation of AM as science in the media, and against governmental support of AM. His blog discusses also wider problems in science, medicine and higher education. It was listed among the 100 best blogs in 2009. It was blog of the week in the New Statesman (30 May 2010). And in 2012 it was co-winner of the first UK Science Blog Prize, awarded by the Good Thinking Society. The most-read post on his blog is not related to alternative medicine however, instead dealing with the death of Stefan Grimm: "Publish and perish at Imperial College London: the death of Stefan Grimm", which has been viewed more than 200,000 times.

=== Controversy over website hosting ===
In May 2007, Colquhoun announced on his website that recent comments he had made questioning the validity of claims made by Ann Walker, a lecturer in Nutrition at the University of Reading and a herbalist, had resulted in a complaint to Malcolm Grant, provost of UCL. In response to legal threats from Alan Lakin, husband of Walker, Grant required Colquhoun to remove his website from the UCL server. This resulted in an outcry from the scientific community, citing a violation of Colquhoun's academic freedom. Grant ultimately reconsidered his decision and on 13 June 2007, he and Colquhoun released a joint statement that Colquhoun's website would be reinstated with some modifications effected on advice of counsel. By that time, the web pages had been moved to a proper blog and never did return to the UCL server.

=== Controversy over election of Andrew Mountbatten-Windsor (formerly Prince Andrew) to the Royal Society ===
In 2013, Andrew Mountbatten-Windsor, then known as Prince Andrew, was elected as a "Royal Fellow" by the Royal Society. Some fellows of the society thought this was a bad idea because the press had been critical of some aspects of his behaviour. Colquhoun wrote two blog posts on the topic, which resulted in media attention. As a result, the voting form was changed by the Royal Society, though Mountbatten-Windsor remained a Royal Fellow until 2022 when he resigned in the wake of his involvement in the Epstein scandal.

=== Alternative medicine and the government ===
Colquhoun was a member of the Conduct and Competence Committee of the Complementary and Natural Healthcare Council (CNHC), a regulatory body for alternative medicine in the UK. Colquhoun has stated he was surprised at being accepted for the position. However, he was dismissed in August 2010.

Colquhoun continues to write on the danger of the alternative medicine industry using government regulation for its own ends. In a 2012 article from the Scottish Universities Medical Journal, he wrote:

There are various levels of regulation. The "highest" level is the statutory regulation of osteopathy and chiropractic. The General Chiropractic Council (GCC) has exactly the same legal status as the General Medical Council (GMC). This ludicrous state of affairs arose because nobody in John Major's government had enough scientific knowledge to realise that chiropractic, and some parts of osteopathy, are pure quackery. The problem is that organisations like the GCC function more to promote their discipline rather than regulate them.

== Awards and honours ==
Colquhoun was elected a Fellow of the Royal Society (FRS) in 1985 and awarded the Humboldt Prize in 1990. In 2015, he was awarded the Wellcome Gold Medal by the British Pharmacological Society.

== Personal life ==
In 1976, he married Margaret Ann Boultwood. They have a son and two granddaughters.

Outside academia, Colquhoun has enjoyed (in chronological order) boxing, flying light aircraft, sailing (21 ft, and later 31 ft sloops), long-distance running (10 km, half-marathon and marathon), and mountain walking. In 1988 he did the London marathon in 3 hours 57 minutes. For his 65th birthday, in 2001, he walked across the Alps (Oberstdorf, Germany, to Merano, Italy).
