= List of fellows of the Royal Society elected in 1985 =

Fellows of the Royal Society elected in 1985.

== Fellows ==
1. Michael Barber (1934–1991)
2. Peter Humphry Greenwood (1927–1995)
3. Martyn Christian Raymond Symons (1925–2002)
4. Walter Laing Macdonald Perry Baron Perry of Walton (1921–2003)
5. Roger Michael Needham (1935–2003)
6. Dame Miriam Louisa Rothschild (1908–2005)
7. Sir Nicholas John Shackleton (1937–2006)
8. Naomi Datta (d. 2008)
9. Duncan Joseph Greenwood (d. 2010)
10. Anne Elizabeth Warner (d. 2012)
11. George Edward Pelham Box (1919–2013)
12. Struther Arnott (d. 2013)
13. Wyndham John Albery
14. Mark Steven Bretscher
15. Ronald Bullough
16. Malcolm Burrows
17. John Henry Coates
18. David Colquhoun
19. John Leonard Celistus Culhane
20. John Frederick Dewey
21. Sir Diarmuid Downs
22. Jonathan Richard Ellis
23. Sir John Edwin Enderby
24. Michael Gaster
25. Malcolm Leslie Hodder Green
26. Cedric Herbert Hassall
27. William George Hill
28. Nevin Campbell Hughes-Jones
29. Ian Macpherson Kerr
30. Philip Douglas Magnus
31. David Quinn Mayne
32. John Edwin Midwinter
33. James Dickson Murray
34. John Stewart Pate
35. Ian Colin Percival
36. Martin Charles Raff
37. Joseph Frank Sambrook
38. John Michael Tutill Thompson
39. Donald Walker
40. Gerald Westheimer

== Foreign members ==
1. Konrad Emil Bloch (1912–2000)
2. Shiing-Shen Chern (1911–2004)
3. Charles Yanofsky
4. Frank Press
5. Knut Schmidt-Nielsen (1915–2007)
6. Glenn Theodore Seaborg (1912–1999)
