= Alfred Clark =

Alfred Clark can refer to:

- Allie Clark (Alfred Aloysious Clark, 1923–2012), American baseball player
- Alfred Corning Clark (1844–1896), American philanthropist
- Alfred Clark (director) (1873–1950), Anglo-American pioneer of cinema and gramophone and collector of ceramics
- Alfred Gordon Clark (1900–1958), British judge and crime writer
- A. James Clark (Alfred James Clark, 1927–2015), American engineer and philanthropist
- Alfred Joseph Clark (1885–1941), British pharmacologist
- Joseph Alfred Clark (1872–1951), Australian politician

== See also ==
- Alfred C. Chapin (Alfred Clark Chapin, 1848–1936), American politician
