= Stephanie Schorge =

Neuroscientist

- Education: Yale University; Brown University
- Scientific career
- Workplaces: University College London
- Thesis: mRNA variants of the n-type Ca channel α₁_{B} subunit : their distribution and functional impact on the mammalian nervous system (1999)

Stephanie Schorge is a Professor of Neuroscience in the Department of Neuroscience, Physiology and Pharmacology at University College London. She is known for her research into mutations that cause neurological diseases.

== Education and career ==
Schorge received her B.S. from Yale University in 1994. She obtained a Ph.D. in Neuroscience from Brown University where she worked with Diane Lipscombe. Schorge has held postdoctoral positions at the Department of Pharmacology and the Institute of Neurology, both at the University College London. She has had a fellowship from the Worshipful Company of Pewterers and a university research fellowship from the Royal Society. In 2018 Schorge moved to the UCL School of Pharmacy to become professor in translational neuroscience and director of the research department of pharmacology. In 2021 she became head of the Department of Neuroscience, Physiology and Pharmacology (NPP). She was subsequently awarded the Sophia Jex-Blake Chair of Physiology.

== Research ==
Schorge is known for her research in how mutations in ion channels can cause neurological disease and how manipulating ion channels can be used to treat disease. She has worked on RNA processing in voltage gated calcium channels, single channel biophysics of NMDA receptors. and investigated the functional impacts of mutations in ion channels that are linked to human neurological disorders, the channelopathies. She has also examined the genetics and functions of mutations linked to epilepsy, particularly in sodium channels, and researched gene therapy treatments for epilepsy.

== Selected publications ==
- Schorge, Stephanie; Colquhoun, David (2003-02-15). "Studies of NMDA Receptor Function and Stoichiometry with Truncated and Tandem Subunits". The Journal of Neuroscience. 23 (4): 1151–1158. doi:10.1523/JNEUROSCI.23-04-01151.2003. ISSN 0270-6474. PMC 6742241. PMID 12598603.
- Tate, Sarah K.; Depondt, Chantal; Sisodiya, Sanjay M.; Cavalleri, Gianpiero L.; Schorge, Stephanie; Soranzo, Nicole; Thom, Maria; Sen, Arjune; Shorvon, Simon D.; Sander, Josemir W.; Wood, Nicholas W.; Goldstein, David B. (2005-04-12). "Genetic predictors of the maximum doses patients receive during clinical use of the anti-epileptic drugs carbamazepine and phenytoin". Proceedings of the National Academy of Sciences. 102 (15): 5507–5512. Bibcode:2005PNAS..102.5507T. doi:10.1073/pnas.0407346102. ISSN 0027-8424. PMC 556232. PMID 15805193.
- Schorge, Stephanie; Leemput, Joyce van de; Singleton, Andrew; Houlden, Henry; Hardy, John (2010-05-01). "Human ataxias: a genetic dissection of inositol triphosphate receptor (ITPR1)-dependent signaling". Trends in Neurosciences. 33 (5): 211–219. doi:10.1016/j.tins.2010.02.005. ISSN 0166-2236. PMC 4684264. PMID 20226542.
- Wykes, Robert C.; Heeroma, Joost H.; Mantoan, Laura; Zheng, Kaiyu; MacDonald, Douglas C.; Deisseroth, Karl; Hashemi, Kevan S.; Walker, Matthew C.; Schorge, Stephanie; Kullmann, Dimitri M. (2012-11-21). "Optogenetic and Potassium Channel Gene Therapy in a Rodent Model of Focal Neocortical Epilepsy". Science Translational Medicine. 4 (161): 161ra152. doi:10.1126/scitranslmed.3004190. ISSN 1946-6234. PMC 3605784. PMID 23147003.
