= David Clark (psychiatrist) =

British psychiatrist (1920–2010)

David Hazell Clark (28 August 1920 – 29 March 2010) was a British psychiatrist who was medical Superintendent at Fulbourn Hospital (1953–1983).

== Biography ==
David's father, Alfred Clark, was professor of pharmacology at University College London from a Quaker background and expected his son to follow in his footsteps. At age 16, David was sent to Germany to improve his language skills and was sent by his host family to a Hitler Youth camp. He was aghast at their racial theories and when war broke out finished his medical studies quickly to take part in the war effort. As a medical officer in a transit camp for refugees he was strongly affected by the horrors of Belsen. After a spell in Sumatra where he organized the evacuation of 20,000 Dutch civilians from a Japanese internment camp, he spent six months in Palestine where he had his first experience of psychiatry.

He then trained under Sir David Henderson in Edinburgh and Professor Aubrey Lewis at the Maudsley, before being appointed in 1953 at age 32 to Fulbourn Hospital as the youngest medical superintendent in the country, responsible for nearly 1,000 patients.

He began by involving the nurses and other doctors in his plans, and by 1958 had unlocked the doors of all the wards. In 1962 he made a trip to the USA visiting David A. Hamburg at the Center for Advanced Study in the Behavioral Sciences, located as a institute at Stanford independent from the University. He then started to create therapeutic communities in some wards, where patients had responsibility for day-to-day affairs. He changed the focus from treating patients in isolation to working with the whole institution.

In 1967, he was appointed as a World Health Organization adviser, visiting psychiatric services in Japan, Peru, Argentina and Poland. The same year, he was awarded a PhD by the University of Edinburgh for his thesis "Psychiatric halfway house." In 1972, David helped to found the Association of Therapeutic Communities and was its first chairman.

After he retired he was active with the University of the Third Age.

His verdict on recent changes in the NHS was critical: "Authoritarian, bureaucratic organisation which the NHS has become... run by managers under constant pressure from central government to save money, cut costs and keep things under tight control... they have reverted to the kind of administrative behaviour that marked the worst of the asylum days."

In 1946, David married Mary Rose Harris having three children. After a divorce he married Margaret Farrell in 1983 acquiring five stepsons.

== Books ==
- Administrative Therapy (1962)
- Social Therapy in Psychiatry (1974)
- Descent into Conflict, 1945: A Doctor's War (1995)
- The Story of a Mental Hospital - Fulbourn 1858-1893. (1996)
