= Hannah Steinberg =

Austrian-born British pioneer of experimental psychopharmacology

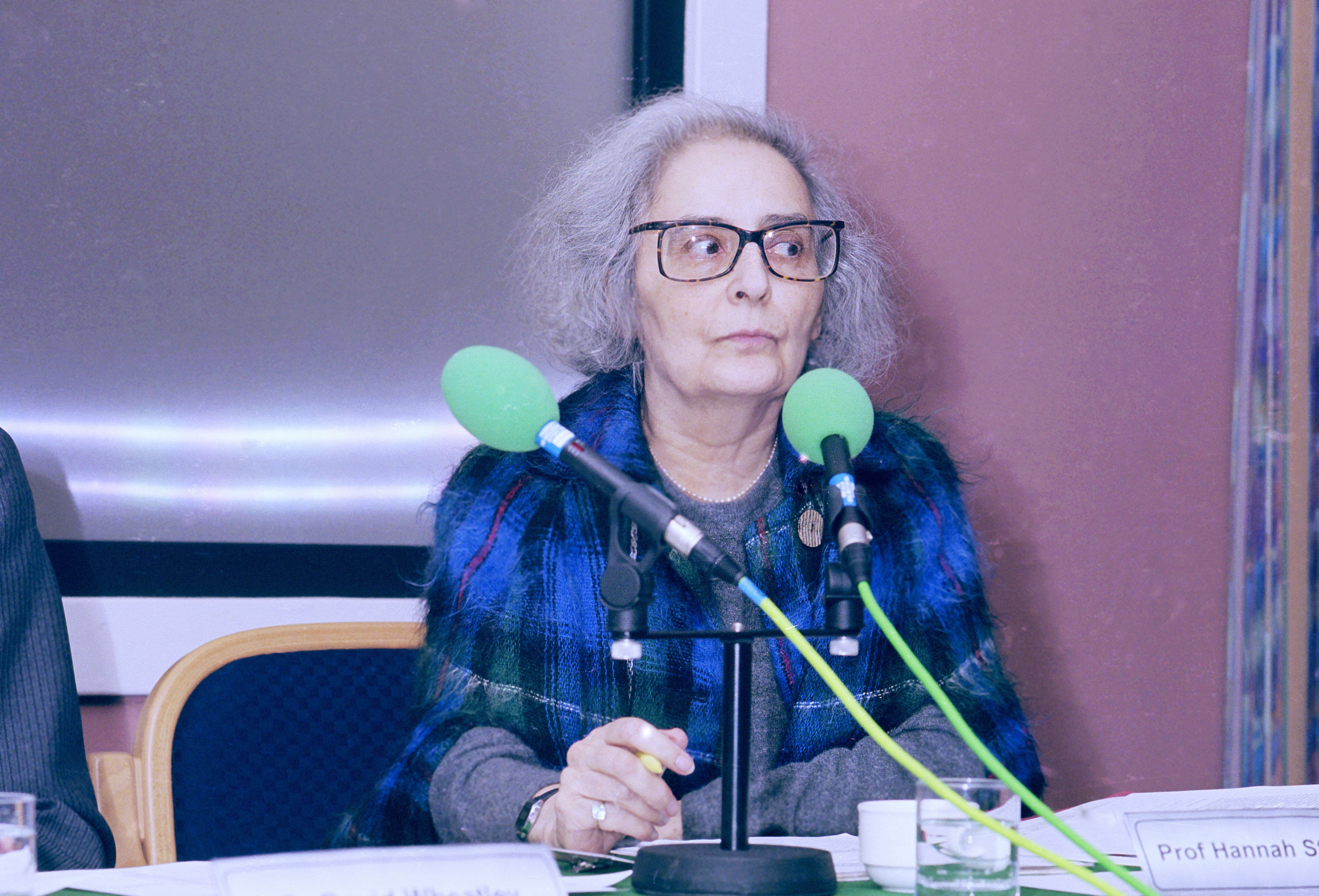
- Steinberg in 1997
- Born: 16 March 1926
- Died: 11 December 2019 (aged 93)
- Education: Putney High School; University College London
- Scientific career
- Workplaces: University College London
- Thesis: Some effects of depressant drugs on behaviour (1953)

Hannah Steinberg (16 March 1926 – 11 December 2019) was a pioneer of experimental psychopharmacology, the study of the interaction of drugs on the human mind.

== Early life ==
Steinberg was born in Vienna to the lawyer Michael Steinberg and his wife Marie (née Wein). They arranged for her to leave Vienna in 1938 and she was one of the first Jewish children to travel on the Kindertransport. and arrived in London where she was educated at Putney High School and Queen Anne's School, Caversham. After studying for a Certificate in Commerce at Reading University and then at Denton Secretarial College she changed course. After beginning a degree in French at University College London, she then converted to Psychology and graduated with a first in 1948.

== Career ==
Her curiosity about science led her to work with Frank Winton in the Department of Pharmacology at UCL, where she completing a PhD exploring the effects of nitrous oxide on task completion. She discovered that small amounts interfered with completing complex tasks but that it also improved memory recall. She continued to work at UCL for the rest of her career, in 1962 becoming the first Reader of Psychopharmacology in the world and in 1970, the first Professor of Psychopharmacology. Her research focused on the effects of drug combinations, which she discovered could not be predicted from the actions of the drugs alone. She also explored how the drug efficacy could be impacted by the emotional state of the drug taker. From this her interests grew to encompass drug-taking behaviours and addiction. Many of her test subjects were students and she also tested on staff, including J. B. S. Haldane, but she never tested drugs on humans that she had not tested on herself. She also worked closely with Elizabeth Sykes, her long-term colleague and partner, to investigate benefits of exercise for wellbeing and creativity the potential my harmful exercise addiction.

== Other work ==
Steinberg was a founding member of the British Association of Psychopharmacology and the International College of Neuropyschopharmacology. She also founded the Academic Women's Achievement Group at UCL; the minutes from 1979 to 1986 are held at the National Archives.

== Publications ==
- with P. E. Harrison-Read: Lithium-induced Hypersensitivity to Foot Shock in Rats and the Role of 5-Hydroxytryptophan. Nature New Biol, 232, 30, July 1971, pp 120 sequ doi:10.1038/newbio232120a0
