= Clifford J. Woolf =

Neurobiologist and professor

Clifford Woolf
- Born: South Africa
- Occupations: Neurobiologist; professor

Academic background
- Education: University of the Witwatersrand

Academic work
- Institutions: Harvard Medical School; Boston Children’s Hospital
- Main interests: Pain; neurodegeneration; neuroregeneration

Clifford J. Woolf is professor of neurology and neurobiology at Harvard Medical School and director of the F.M. Kirby Neurobiology Center at Boston Children’s Hospital. He has added greatly to the understanding of pain.

== Career ==
Woolf is a neurobiologist who works on pain, neurodegeneration and the regeneration of the injured nervous system. He was born in South Africa and studied medicine at the University of the Witwatersrand in Johannesburg in the early 1970s, completing M.B., Ch.B. and Ph.D. degrees. With his wife, Fredia, he then emigrated to the United Kingdom in 1979 where he held medical and research positions first at Middlesex Hospital and then at University College London (UCL), working at the latter initially under the tutelage of Patrick D. Wall.

At UCL, Woolf described for the first time the central amplification of pain by central sensitization, demonstrating that the phenomenon can be measured in neurons in the dorsal horn of the spinal cord, involves the neurotransmitter N-methyl-D-aspartate, can be moderated by opiates, and contributes to tactile allodynia and secondary hyperalgesia after tissue or nerve injury. At a time when surgeons and anesthesiologists routinely only administered analgesia after the patient complained of severe pain, he collaborated on clinical trials investigating the benefits of giving morphine analgesia prior to surgery, to preempt post-surgical central sensitization. His work is largely responsible for the current practice of treating pain early (preventive analgesia) and has led to the use of NMDA antagonists for the treatment of pain. His lab was the first to demonstrate in the early 1990s that nerve growth factor (NGF) contributes to inflammatory pain. He became a Professor of Neurobiology at UCL.

In 1997 Woolf moved to Boston and assumed the Richard J. Kitz Chair of Anesthesia Research at Harvard Medical School and became Director of the Neural Plasticity Research Group in the Department of Anesthesia and Critical Care at Massachusetts General Hospital (MGH).

Using subtractive hybridization and microarrays his laboratory and research teams demonstrated the involvement of hundreds of genes in pain-related conditions, collaborated in the cloning of a novel nociceptor-specific sodium channel, described the intracellular signaling pathways and ion channel/receptors that mediate central sensitization and shown that cyclo-oxygenase is produced in the spinal cord by peripheral inflammation.

In February 2010 Woolf became the director of the F.M. Kirby Neurobiology Center at Boston Children’s Hospital, professor of neurology and neurobiology at Harvard Medical School, as well as a faculty member in the Department of Neurobiology at Harvard Medical School. Dr Woolf is also deputy director of the Intellectual Developmental Disability Disorders Center at Boston Children’s Hospital and co-director of the neuroscience program of the Harvard Stem Cell Institute.

At Boston Children’s Hospital Woolf has pioneered the use of human stem cell neurons to study pain, ALS and regeneration. He has also contributed to the appreciation that sensory neurons contribute to certain inflammatory conditions by neuroimmune interactions. His work has been devoted to taking a more mechanistic approach to the study of pain and into translating this into new therapies, especially by inhibiting key pain promoting modulators and by selectively silencing pain signaling.

Woolf was awarded the Gill Distinguished Scientist award and the Reeve-Irvine medal in 2017 and in 2015 the Kerr award from the American Pain Society, a Founders Award from the American Academy of Pain Medicine and became an honorary fellow of the Irish College of Anesthetists. He was awarded the Magnes medal in Israel in 2013 and selected to deliver the FE Bennett Memorial Lecture by the American Neurological Association in 2012. He was awarded a Javits Award from the NINDS at the NIH in 2011, delivered the Schmidt lecture at MIT in 2011, the Bonica Lecture for the International Society of the Study of Pain in 2010, was Visiting Professor at Columbia University in 2009 and received the Wall Medal from the Royal College of Anesthetists in the U.K. also in 2009. Woolf was awarded the American Society of Anesthesiologists award for excellence in research in 2004.

In 2015 Dr. Woolf was appointed to the Board of Scientific Councilors of the National Institute of Neurological Diseases and Stroke.

He was elected a Fellow of the Royal Society in 2026.
