= Lucia Sivilotti =

Professor Lucia G. Sivilotti
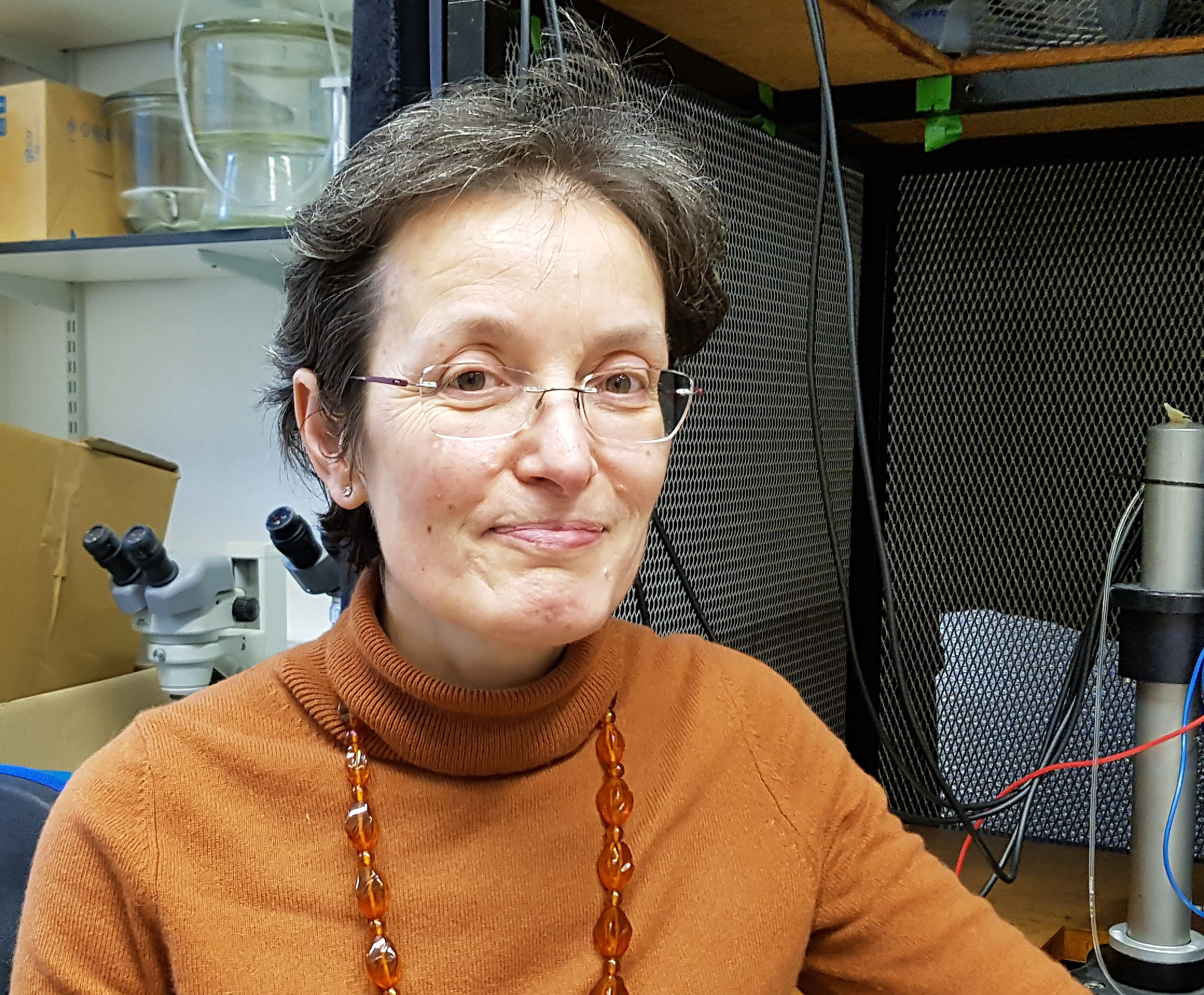
- Born: 1957 (age 68–69); Ferrara, Italy
- Citizenship: Italian
- Education: University of Ferrara; University of Milan
- Known for: The binding/gating problem; Single ion channel analysis
- Scientific career
- Fields: Pharmacology; Ion channels; Single ion channels
- Workplaces: Barts and The London School of Medicine and Dentistry PhD; UCL School of Pharmacy; University College London
- Thesis: Pharmacological actions of neutral amino acids on synaptic transmission in the frog optic tectum (1988)
- Doctoral advisor: Andrea Nistri
- Website: https://www.ucl.ac.uk/biosciences/departments/npp/people/ls http://www.onemol.org.uk

Lucia Giulia Sivilotti is an Italian pharmacologist. She holds the A.J. Clark Chair of Pharmacology at University College London. Her work is aimed at understanding the functioning of receptors that mediate fast synaptic transmission, and focuses on two classes of ion channels in the nicotinic superfamily, nicotinic and glycine receptors.

== Early life and education ==
Sivilotti graduated in Pharmaceutical Chemistry from the University of Ferrara in Italy. After graduate work in Ferrara and Milan on the modulation of transmitter release in the CNS, she was awarded travelling fellowships by the Royal Society and the Italian Ministry of Education to work at St Bartholomew's Hospital Medical College in London. This project led to the description of what is now called the GABA_{C} receptor and the award of a PhD in 1988.

After a career break for family reasons, she undertook postdoctoral work at University College London, first with Clifford J. Woolf in the Anatomy Department, then with David Colquhoun in Pharmacology. In 1997, she joined The School of Pharmacy as a lecturer in Pharmacology, before moving back to UCL in 2003. She became a Professor of Pharmacology in 2008.

== Scientific work ==
Sivilotti uses electrophysiological methods to assess receptor function, combined with molecular biology methods to alter receptor structure. In addition she collaborates with crystallographers and molecular dynamicists to complement the functional work.

Her lab specialises in recording single ion channel activity and analysing it by the fitting of activation mechanisms. Mechanisms specify the number of conformations in which the channel-receptor protein can exist, the number of ligand molecules bound, and the connections between the states. Fitting them to the data allows the estimation of rate and equilibrium constants for transition between states.

In 2004, Sivilotti et al.. produced evidence that the glycine receptor had a short-lived shut conformation (dubbed the "flipped" conformation) that had a higher affinity for glycine than the resting conformation, and was a necessary precursor to the opening of the channel. In 2008, her group showed that partial agonists were partial because of their limited ability to generate this flipped conformation. The channel opening and shutting rates were similar for all agonists, contrary to what had been thought for 50 years

A list of Sivilotti's scientific publications can be found on the UCL site, in Google Scholar, and on her web site, OneMol.org.uk

== Recognition ==
=== Editorial positions ===
2014. Austrian Science Fund Panel, Vienna, Austria.

2010. Austrian Science Fund Panel, Vienna, Austria.

2000-2004. Editorial Board of the British Journal of Pharmacology.

2015 onwards. Advisory Editorial Board of the Journal of General Physiology (USA)

2018 onwards Board of Reviewing Editors of Science

=== Named lecture ===
2014 Gary Price Memorial Lecture, British Pharmacological Society meeting, London

2018 Fabio Ruzzier Memorial Lecture, Societa' Italiana di Fisiologia, Florence

=== Other recognition (current) ===
Trustee and council member of the Physiological Society (2012-2016)
