= Preventive analgesia =

Post-surgery pain reduction medical practice

Preventive analgesia is a practice aimed at reducing short- and long-term post-surgery pain. Activity in the body's pain signaling system during surgery produces "sensitization", increasing the intensity of post-operative pain. Reducing activity in the body's pain signaling system by the use of analgesics before, during and immediately after surgery is believed to reduce subsequent sensitization, and consequently the intensity of post-surgery pain. The types of nerve activity targeted in preventive analgesia include pre-surgery pain, all pain-system activity caused during surgery, and pain produced post-surgery by damage and inflammation. A person's assessment of pain intensity from standard experimental stimuli prior to surgery is correlated with the intensity of their post-surgery pain. Intensity of the post-surgery pain is correlated with pain intensity on release from hospital, and correlated with the likelihood of experiencing chronic post-surgery pain. Different medications such as pregabalin, acetaminophen, naproxen, and dextromethorphan have been tried in studies about preemptive analgesia. It is not known what causes some cases of acute post-surgery pain to become chronic long-term problems but pain intensity in the short- and long-term post-operative period is correlated with the amount of pain system activity during and around the time of the surgery. It is not known whether reducing post-operative sensitization by the use of preventive analgesia will affect the likelihood of acute post-operative pain becoming chronic.

Psychological interventions could serve as a complement to medication as it has been show to be effective in reducing both (sub)acute and chronic postsurgical pain.

== Risk factors ==
Preoperative predictors of poor postoperative pain control include younger age, female sex, smoking, history of depressive symptoms, history of anxiety symptoms, sleep difficulty, BMI, presence of preoperative pain and preoperative analgesia.
