= Richard Alan North =

British biomedical scientist (born 1944)

Richard Alan North FRS (born 20 May 1944) is a British biomedical scientist, and Professor Emeritus at the University of Manchester. North grew up in Halifax, West Yorkshire and attended Heath Grammar School, before studying at University of Aberdeen. He graduated in medicine (MB ChB) and in physiology (BSc). He took a PhD in the group of Hans Walter Kosterlitz, and worked in Aberdeen hospitals as house office and registrar.

== Biomedical research ==
North's research has been at the interface of physiology, pharmacology and neuroscience. As a PhD student, he discovered the two main classes of neuron in the enteric nervous system and described new type of slow synaptic connection. As a professor at Loyola University Stritch School of Medicine (1975–1981), the Massachusetts Institute of Technology(1981–1986), and the Vollum Institute, Oregon Heath Sciences University (1987–1993), he showed that opiates, as well as several other amine and peptide neurotransmitters, inhibit the activity of neurons by opening potassium-selective ion channels in the cell membrane. This required the development of a method to record electrical activity from single neurons maintained alive in thin brain slices. With John Adelman, he cloned calcium- and voltage-gated potassium channels from the brain. At the Glaxo Institute for Molecular Biology (later Geneva Biomedical Research Institute, 1993–1998) he led the group that isolated complementary DNAs for the family of P2X receptors: these are membrane proteins and ion channels through which extracellular adenosine 5'-triphosphate (ATP) exerts many of its actions.

North was Professor of Molecular Physiology at the University of Sheffield (1998–2004).

== Academic leadership ==
From 2004 to 2011, he was Vice-President of the University of Manchester, serving both as Dean of its Faculty of Life Sciences (2004–2008) and Dean of its Faculty of Medical and Human Sciences (2006–2011), as well as being the inaugural Director of the Manchester Academic Health Sciences Centre. He served on the UK Medical Research Council (2001 to 2006), and was a member of the International Advisory Board of the Korea Research Council for Fundamental Science and Technology(2009–2011). From 2003-2006 he was President of the Physiological Society.

== Mountaineering ==
Alan North is also a mountaineer, and has climbed extensively throughout Scotland and the Alps. He has made several first ascents or new routes on peaks of Upernivik Island, Greenland, and other mountains in the Hindu Kush of Afghanistan, and Peak Lenin in the Soviet Pamirs. He is a long-standing member of the Scottish Mountaineering Club.

== Honours and awards ==
- Fellow, Winston Churchill Memorial Trust, 1968
- Fellowship, Medical Research Council, 1971
- MERIT Award, National Institute of Drug Abuse, 1987
- Fellow, Royal Society of London, 1995
- Honorary DSc, University of Aberdeen, 1998
- Fellow, Royal College of Physicians, 2000
- President, The Physiological Society, 2002–2005
- Editor-in-Chief, British Journal of Pharmacology, 2000–2003
- Member, Academia Europaea, 2004
- Fellow, Academy of Medical Sciences, 2004
- Honorary Fellow, British Pharmacological Society, 2012
- Honorary Member, The Physiological Society, 2013
