= Preemptive analgesia =

Antinociceptive treatment

- Specialty: Neurology

Preemptive analgesia is an antinociceptive treatment that prevents the sensing of a change of state in nociceptors which would otherwise register as pain. The idea was formulated at the beginning of the 20th century on the basis of clinical observations.

It was suggested that the use of regional blocks in addition to general anesthesia would prevent the sensation of pain during the surgery, thereby preventing the formation of scars caused by changes in the central nervous system during surgery. The idea was brought back with a series of animal studies in the early 1980s. Despite controversy that mainly centers around the definition of the term preemptive analgesia, a clear change in opinion has emerged in favor of the importance of operative inflammation.

The preemptive use of gabapentin has been shown to be able to reduce pain scores as well as lower opioid consumption while also lowering postoperative nausea and vomiting.
