= Alfred Joseph Clark =

British pharmacologist (1885–1941)

Alfred Joseph Clark MC FRS FRSE
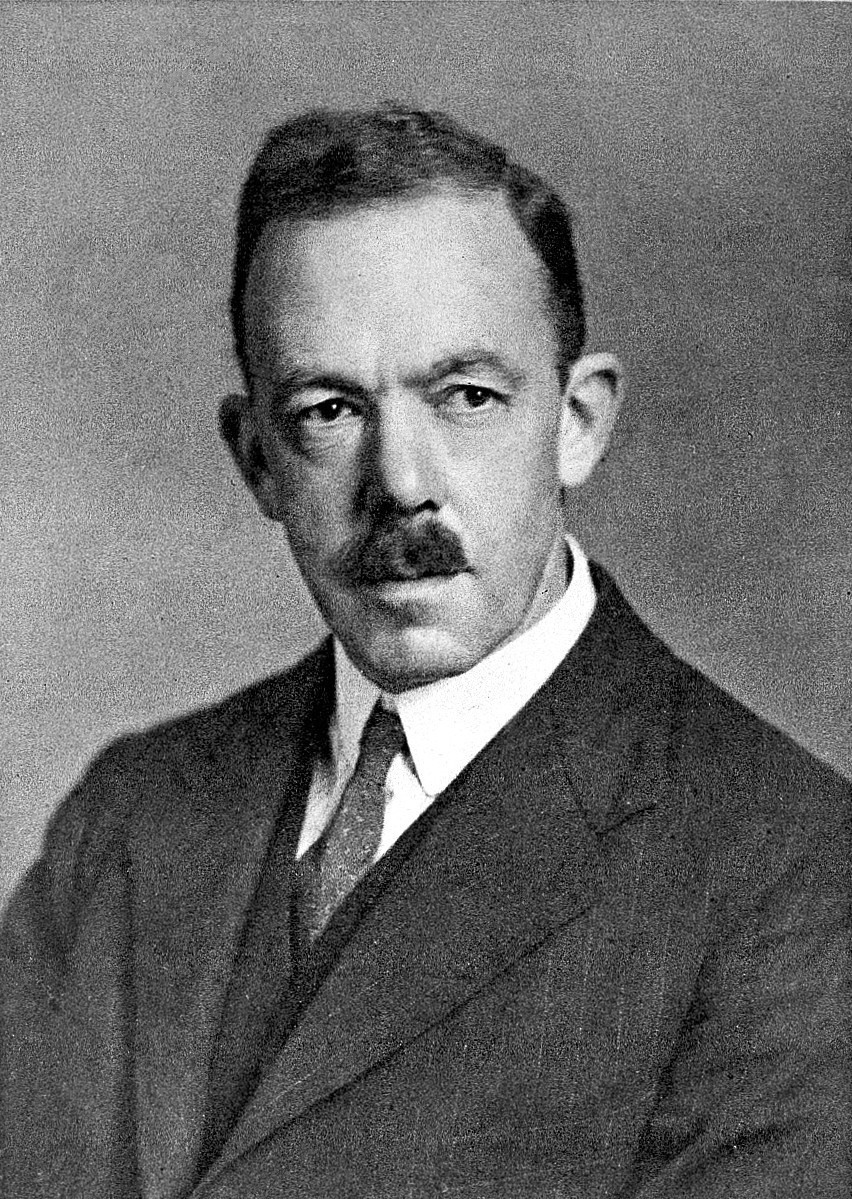
- Born: 19 August 1885; Glastonbury, England
- Died: 30 July 1941 (aged 55); Edinburgh, Scotland
- Spouse: Beatrice "Trixie" Powell Hazell (m. 1919)
- Children: 4, including David

Academic background
- Education: University of Cambridge

Academic work
- Institutions: University of Cape Town; University College London; University of Edinburgh
- Military career
- Allegiance: United Kingdom
- Branch: British Army
- Unit: Royal Army Medical Corps
- Conflicts: World War I; World War II; Dunkirk evacuation

Signature
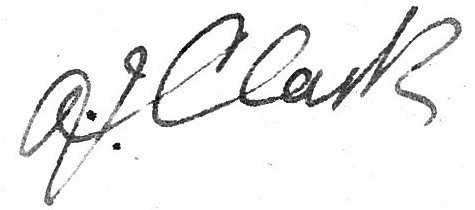

Alfred Joseph Clark MC FRS FRSE (19 August 1885 – 30 July 1941) was a British pharmacologist and Professor of Pharmacology at the University College London. He was a de-bunker of fraudulent remedies and did many early studies on the placebo effect of many claimed cures.

== Life ==
He was born in Glastonbury the son of a Quaker, Francis Joseph Clark of Street, Somerset. He was educated at Bootham School in Yorkshire, and attended the University of Cambridge, graduating with a BA in 1907 and receiving a postgraduate MA in 1910.

After the First World War he was employed briefly as Professor of Pharmacology at Cape Town University in South Africa, but used this as a stepping-stone to the more prestigious role of Professor of Pharmacology at University College London, where he worked 1919 to 1926. The Department of Pharmacology, University College London was the first to be established in England. In 1926 he became Professor of Materia Medica at the University of Edinburgh.

In 1928 he was elected a Fellow of the Royal Society of Edinburgh, his proposers included James Hartley Ashworth, George Barger and Sir James Alfred Ewing. He was elected to the Royal Society in 1931.

He served on the Medical Research Council from 1934 to 1938.

He died in Edinburgh on 30 July 1941 following complications from a surgical procedure for an intestinal obstruction on 28 July.

== Military service ==
Clark served in both World Wars.

In the First World War he joined the Royal Army Medical Corps and received the Military Cross in 1917 for gallantry in France.

In the Second World War he advised the government on gas warfare and was one of the many men evacuated from Dunkirk.

== Family ==
He met Beatrice "Trixie" Powell Hazell in Cape Town in 1918 and they married in 1919. They had two sons and two daughters.

His son, David Clark, became a prominent psychiatrist.

== Publications ==
He was the author of the classic textbook Applied Pharmacology.

- Comparative Physiology of the Heart(1927)
- The Mode of Action of Drugs on Cells (1933)
- General Pharmacology (1937)
- The Metabolism of the Frog's Heart (1938)
- Patent Medicines (1938)
