= Walter Perry =

British academic (1921–2003)

The Right Honourable The Lord Perry of Walton OBE FRS FRCP FRSE
- Born: Walter Laing Macdonald Perry; 16 June 1921; Dundee, Scotland
- Died: 17 July 2003 (aged 82); London, England
- Title: Baron (Life Peerage)
- Children: Jennie Perry, Colin Perry and Rob Perry

Member of the House of Lords
- Lord Temporal
- Life peerage 9 February 1979 – 17 July 2003

Walter Laing MacDonald Perry, Baron Perry of Walton (16 June 1921 – 17 July 2003) was a Scottish academic. He was the first Vice Chancellor of the Open University.

== Life ==
Perry was born in Dundee, son of Flora and Fletcher Perry, and educated at Ayr Academy and the High School of Dundee. He studied medicine at the University of St Andrews, graduating with an MB ChB in 1943, MD in 1948 and a DSc in 1958. Between 1944 and 1946 he worked as a Medical Officer in Nigeria. He later worked as a scientist for institutions like the Medical Research Council. In particular he became an expert on polio. He had a reputation for following the scientific method rigorously.

He developed his career at the University of Edinburgh as Professor of Pharmacology, later Dean of Medicine and Vice Principal. In 1959 he was elected a member of the Harveian Society of Edinburgh. In 1969 he became Vice Chancellor of the Open University and made that university into an effective institution proving that sceptics had been wrong. He was mainly responsible for deciding that the Open University would not compromise on academic standards – he was determined that its qualifications should be of equal academic value to non-distance learning universities. Perry worked further to develop distance learning through the United Nations.

Perry was appointed an Officer of the Order of the British Empire in the 1957 New Year Honours and was knighted in 1974.

He entered the House of Lords upon being created a life peer with the title Baron Perry of Walton, of Walton in the County of Buckinghamshire on 9 February 1979. He joined the Social Democratic Party (SDP) as a founder member in 1981, and was one of the signatories to the Limehouse Declaration. When the SDP merged with the Liberals in 1988 he chose instead to become a member of the anti-merger 'continuing' SDP, and was deputy leader of the new party's peers from 1988 to 1989. He later took the Liberal Democrat whip, and served on the committee dealing with science and technology. He kept working right up to his death in 2003.

Perry married (1) Dr Anne Elizabeth Grant in 1946 (2) Catherine Hilda Crawley in 1971. His second wife's sister Mary married Alun Michael and her brother married Christine Crawley, Baroness Crawley.

A collection of Walter Perry's papers, containing work relating to the Open University, other distance education institutions and work for the House of Lords, are preserved in the Open University Archive.
