= List of fellows of the Royal Society P, Q, R =

About 8,000 fellows have been elected to the Royal Society of London since its inception in 1660. Below is a list of people who are or were Fellow or Foreign Member of the Royal Society. The date of election to the fellowship follows the name. Dates in brackets relate to an award or event associated with the person. The Society maintains a complete online list. This list is complete up to and including 2019.

List of Fellows and Foreign Members of the Royal Society
A, B, C	D, E, F	G, H, I	J, K, L	M, N, O	P, Q, R	S, T, U, V	W, X, Y, Z

== List of fellows ==
=== P ===
Name	Election date	Notes
Henry Butler Pacey	4 June 1752	? 1754
Vassilis Pachnis	9 May 2018	
Giovan Battista Pacichelli	16 April 1674	c. 1634–1695
Kenneth John Packer	14 March 1991	
Philip Packer	20 May 1663	? June 1618 – 24 December 1686 Original
Camillo Paderni	24 April 1755	fl 1755
Miles Padgett	30 April 2014	1 June 1963 –
Frederick William Page	16 March 1978	21 February 1917 – 29 May 2005
Thomas Hyde Page	10 July 1783	1746 – 30 June 1821
Bernard Ephraim Julius Pagel	12 March 1992	
Mark Pagel	19 May 2011	
Edward Paget	8 November 1682	? 1652–1703 Maths Master, Christ's Hospital
George Edward Paget	12 June 1873	22 December 1809 – 16 January 1892 Physician
James Paget	5 June 1851	11 January 1814 – 30 December 1899
Edward George Sydney Paige	17 March 1983	19 July 1930 – 20 February 2004
Autar Singh Paintal	19 March 1981	24 September 1925 – 21 December 2004
John Somerset Pakington, 1st Baron Hampton	17 June 1858	21 February 1799 – 9 April 1880
Benjamin Peary Pal	16 March 1972	26 May 1906 – 14 September 1989
Francis Palgrave	15 November 1821	July 1788 – 6 July 1861
Robert Harry Inglis Palgrave	8 June 1882	11 June 1827 – 25 January 1919
Peter Simon Pallas	7 June 1764	? 22 September 1741 – ? 8 September 1811
Andrew Clennel Palmer	10 March 1994	
Dudley Palmer	22 April 1663	c. 1617–1666 Original
Henry Robinson Palmer	8 December 1831	1795 – 12 September 1844
Jeffrey Palmer	25 February 1720	? July 1700 – 25 February 1721
John Roundell Palmer, 4th Earl of Selborne	20 June 1991	Statute
Roundell Palmer, 1st Earl of Selborne	7 June 1860	27 November 1812 – 4 May 1895
Samuel Palmer	5 December 1728	– 20 April 1738
Thomas Palmer	12 May 1726	? 1685 – ? 16 March 1735
Timothy Noel Palmer	15 May 2003	
Tracy Palmer	9 May 2018	8 May 1967
William Finch Palmer	18 May 1786	fl 1786
Henry Paman	1 December 1679	? April 1623 – ? June 1695
Roger Paman	12 May 1743	– 1748
Giuseppe Maria Pancrazi	15 January 1756	fl 1756
Friedrich Adolf Paneth	20 March 1947	31 August 1887 – 17 September 1958
Josephus de Panicis	5 June 1740	– 1757
Carl Frederick Abel Pantin	6 May 1937	30 March 1899 – 14 January 1967
Martin Panzano	11 June 1761	August 1775
Pasquale de Paoli	3 March 1774	26 April 1725 – 5 February 1807
John C B Papaloizou	15 May 2003	
David Papillon	30 June 1720	1691 – 26 February 1762
Denis Papin	31 December 1680	22 August 1647 – ? January 1712
John Paradise	2 May 1771	April 1743 – 12 December 1795
Anant Parekh	16 April 2019	
Peter Robert Parham	16 May 2008	
John Ayrton Paris	21 June 1821	7 August 1785 – 4 December 1856
Woodbine Parish	4 March 1824	14 September 1796 – 16 August 1882
Mary Parke	16 March 1972	23 March 1908 – 17 July 1989
David Parker	9 May 2002	Professor of Chemistry, Durham Univ
Geoffrey Alan Parker	16 March 1989	
George Parker, 2nd Earl of Macclesfield	25 October 1722	c. 1697 – 17 March 1764 PRS
George Parker, 4th Earl of Macclesfield	5 November 1818	25 February 1755 – 20 March 1842
Ian Parker	16 May 2008	Biophysicist, Univ of California
John Parker, 1st Baron Boringdon	9 April 1767	c. 1735 – 27 April 1788
John Parker, 1st Earl of Morley	26 February 1795	5 May 1772 – 14 March 1840
Peter Joseph Jacques Parker	18 May 2006	
Robert Ladislav Parker	16 March 1989	
Samuel Parker	13 June 1666	1640 – 21 March 1688
Thomas Jeffery Parker	7 June 1888	17 October 1850 – 7 November 1897
Thomas Lister Parker	1 June 1815	? 27 September 1779 – 2 March 1858
Thomas Parker, 1st Earl of Macclesfield	20 March 1712	23 July 1666 – 28 April 1732
Thomas Parker, 3rd Earl of Macclesfield	19 November 1747	3 October 1723 – 9 February 1795
William Parker	19 February 1747	1714 – 22 July 1802 Clergyman
William Kitchen Parker	1 June 1865	23 June 1823 – 3 July 1890
Alan Sterling Parkes	11 May 1933	10 September 1900 – 17 July 1990
Edmund Alexander Parkes	6 June 1861	29 March 1819 – 15 March 1876
Ronald John Parkes	10 May 2011	Geomicrobiologist
Julian Parkhill	30 April 2014	
Stuart Stephen Papworth Parkin	11 May 2000	
John Parkinson	6 February 1840	3 April 1847 British Consul, Mexico
Stephen Parkinson	2 June 1870	1 August 1823 – 2 January 1889
Thomas Parkinson	23 February 1786	1745 – 13 November 1830 Clergyman
William Arthur Parks	3 May 1934	11 December 1868 – 3 October 1936
Thomas Parkyns, 1st Baron Rancliffe	6 December 1787	1755 – 17 November 1800
Bartholomew Parr	23 March 1797	1750 – 20 November 1810
Francis Rex Parrington	15 March 1962	21 February 1905 – 17 April 1981
Caleb Hillier Parry	22 May 1800	21 October 1755 – 9 March 1822 Physician
Charles Henry Parry	20 February 1812	1779 – 21 January 1860 Physician
William Edward Parry	15 February 1821	19 December 1790 – ? 9 July 1855
William Parry	15 March 1984	3 July 1934 – 20 August 2006
Charles Algernon Parsons	9 June 1898	13 June 1854 – 11 February 1931
James Parsons	7 May 1741	March 1705 – 4 April 1770
Lawrence Parsons, 4th Earl of Rosse	19 December 1867	17 November 1840 – 29 August 1908
Robert Mann Parsons	2 June 1870	29 September 1829 – 20 May 1897 Army surveyor
Roger Parsons	20 March 1980	
John Herbert Parsons	12 May 1921	3 September 1868 – 7 October 1957 Eye surgeon
Leonard Gregory Parsons	18 March 1948	25 November 1879 – 17 December 1950 Prof. of Paediatrics, Univ. of Birmingham
William Parsons	22 November 1787	– 15 January 1828
William Parsons, 3rd Earl of Rosse	8 December 1831	17 June 1800 – 31 October 1867 PRS
Henry Partridge	19 February 1778	– 30 December 1803 Barrister
Linda Partridge	14 March 1996	
Richard Partridge	23 February 1837	19 January 1805 – 25 March 1873
Stanley Miles Partridge	19 March 1970	2 August 1913 – 26 April 1992
Donald William Pashley	21 March 1968	
Sir Charles William Pasley	7 March 1816	8 September 1780 – 19 April 1861
Frank Pasquill	17 March 1977	8 September 1914 – 15 October 1994
Giovanni Battista Passeri	12 November 1747	10 November 1694 – 4 February 1780
Richard Edward Passingham	15 May 2009	
Robert Paston, 1st Earl of Yarmouth	20 May 1663	29 May 1631 – 8 March 1683 Original
William Paston, 2nd Earl of Yarmouth	30 November 1722	1652 – 25 December 1732
John Stewart Pate	21 March 1985	
Ketan J. Patel	1 May 2015	Molecular biologist
John Arthur Joseph Pateman	16 March 1978	
Ian Paterson	26 May 2005	
Michael Stewart Paterson	10 May 2001	
Sir Clifford Copland Paterson	19 March 1942	17 October 1879 – 26 July 1948
William Paterson	10 May 1798	17 August 1755 – 21 June 1810
Diarmid Noel Paton	7 May 1914	19 March 1859 – 30 September 1928
Thomas Angus Lyall Paton	20 March 1969	10 May 1905 – 7 April 1999
William Drummond MacDonald Paton	15 March 1956	5 May 1917 – 17 October 1993 Prof. of Pharmacology, Oxford Univ.
Archibald Patoun	30 April 1730	1706–1775
Gerald Pattenden	14 March 1991	
Colin Patterson	11 March 1993	13 October 1933 – 9 March 1998 Palaeozoologist
Karalyn Patterson	30 April 2014	
Robert Patterson	9 June 1859	18 April 1802 – 14 February 1872
Hugh Lee Pattinson	3 June 1852	25 December 1796 – 11 November 1858
Robert Paul	30 November 1716	c. 1697 – 19 June 1762
Louis Paule	25 November 1691	fl 1691–1702
Lawrence Paulson	5 May 2017	
Frederick William Pavy	4 June 1863	29 May 1829 – 19 September 1911
Edward Pawlet	3 November 1726	April 1768
Godfrey Stuart Pawley	12 March 1992	
Joseph Lade Pawsey	18 March 1954	14 May 1908 – 30 November 1962
Anthony James Pawson	10 March 1994	
David Neil Payne	12 March 1992	
Michael Christopher Payne	16 May 2008	Prof of Computational Physics, Cavendish Lab.
Ralph Payne, 1st Baron Lavington	29 April 1779	19 March 1738 – 3 August 1807
William Payne	9 November 1681	1650 – 20 February 1697 Clergyman
Benjamin Neeve Peach	2 June 1892	6 September 1842 – 29 January 1926
Henry John Peachey, 3rd Baron Selsey	27 March 1817	4 September 1787 – 10 March 1838
James Peachey, 1st Baron Selsey	28 February 1782	9 March 1723 – 1 February 1808
John Peachey, 2nd Baron Selsey	29 May 1777	16 March 1749 – 27 June 1816
George Peacock	29 January 1818	9 April 1791 – 8 November 1858
John Andrew Peacock	17 May 2007	
William James Peacock	18 March 1982	14 December 1937 – October 2025
Malcolm Peaker	14 March 1996	
John Martindale Pearce	18 May 2006	
William Pearce	1 May 1788	3 December 1744 – 14 November 1820 University Administrator
Zachary Pearce	30 June 1720	8 September 1690 – 29 June 1774
Laurence Pearl	16 May 2008	structural biologist
William Harold Pearsall	14 March 1940	23 July 1891 – 14 October 1964
Barbara Mary Frances Pearse	17 March 1988	
Egon Sharpe Pearson	17 March 1966	11 August 1895 – 12 June 1980
George Pearson	23 June 1791	? September 1751 – 9 November 1828
Henry Harold Welch Pearson	11 May 1916	28 January 1870 – 3 November 1916
John Pearson	14 March 1667	29 February 1613 – 16 July 1686
John Pearson	24 March 1803	3 January 1758 – 12 May 1826
John Richard Anthony Pearson	26 May 2005	
Karl Pearson	4 June 1896	27 March 1857 – 27 April 1936
Edwin Pearson	5 December 1833	1802 – 18 April 1883
William Hyde Pearson	9 March 1826	– 1849
William Pearson	1 July 1819	23 April 1767 – 6 September 1847
William Stanley Peart	20 March 1969	
Rendel Sebastian Pease	17 March 1977	2 November 1922 – 17 October 2004
Stanley Peat	18 March 1948	23 August 1902 – 22 February 1969
Samuel John Brooke Pechell	2 February 1832	1 September 1785 – 3 November 1849
Joannes Nicolaus Pechlin	30 November 1688	c. 1646 -
Alexander Pedler	2 June 1892	21 May 1849 – 13 May 1918
Timothy John Pedley	9 March 1995	
Pedro II, Emperor of Brazil	23 November 1871	2 December 1825 – 5 December 1891 Royal
Phillip James Edwin Peebles	18 March 1982	
Robert Peel	5 December 1822	6 February 1788 – 2 July 1850
Christopher Pegge	19 March 1795	1765 – 3 August 1822
Rudolf Ernst Peierls	22 March 1945	5 June 1907 – 19 September 1995 physicist
Jeremiah Peirce	25 March 1742	fl 1742–1767
Joseph Sriyal Malik Peiris	18 May 2006	
Peter Peirson	3 July 1794	1739 – 27 December 1808
Thomas Pelham-Holles, Duke of Newcastle upon Tyne and Duke of Newcastle-under-Lyme	26 October 1749	23 July 1693 – 17 November 1768
Charles Anderson-Pelham, 1st Baron Yarborough	8 May 1777	4 February 1749 – 22 September 1823
Henry Pelham	17 April 1746	1696 – 6 March 1754
Hugh Reginald Brentnall Pelham	17 March 1988	26 August 1954 –
Thomas Pelham, 2nd Earl of Chichester	24 April 1800	28 April 1756 – 4 July 1826
John Pell	20 May 1663	1 March 1611 – 12 December 1685 Original
Thomas Pellet	20 March 1712	? 1671 – 4 July 1744
John Henry Pelly	2 April 1835	31 March 1777 – 13 August 1852
Christopher Robert Pemberton	22 December 1796	1765 – 31 July 1822
Francis Pemberton	9 June 1715	? 1679 – 19 May 1762 Barrister
George Pemberton	11 February 1813	15 May 1784 – 6 April 1851
Henry Pemberton	30 November 1720	1694 – 9 March 1771
Josephine Pemberton	5 May 2017	
Marcus Seymour Pembrey	11 May 1922	28 May 1868 – 23 July 1934
Edward William Wynne Pendarves	24 May 1827	6 April 1775 – 26 June 1853
John Brian Pendry	15 March 1984	
Wilder Graves Penfield	18 March 1943	26 January 1891 – 5 April 1976
William Pengelly	4 June 1863	12 January 1812 – 16 March 1894
Howard Latimer Penman	15 March 1962	10 April 1909 – 15 October 1984
John Penn	9 June 1859	1805 – 23 September 1878
Richard Penn	18 November 1824	1784 – 21 April 1863
William Penn	13 November 1806	fl 1806
William Penn	9 November 1681	14 October 1644 – 30 July 1718
David Pennant	15 November 1792	– 1841
Thomas Pennant	26 February 1767	14 June 1726 – 16 December 1798
Richard Penneck	14 April 1768	1728 – 29 January 1803
Montague Mattinson Pennell	20 March 1980	20 March 1916 – 30 December 1981
William George Penney, Baron Penney of East Hendred	21 March 1946	24 June 1909 – 3 March 1991
Colin James Pennycuick	15 March 1990	
Francis Cranmer Penrose	7 June 1894	29 October 1817 – 15 February 1903
Lionel Sharples Penrose	19 March 1953	11 June 1898 – 12 May 1972
Oliver Penrose	19 March 1987	
Roger Penrose	16 March 1972	
Henry Penton	16 November 1780	c. 1737 – 15 January 1812
Michael Pepper	17 March 1983	
John Christopher Pepusch	13 June 1745	1667 – 20 July 1752
Mark Brian Pepys	14 May 1998	
Samuel Pepys	15 February 1665	24 February 1633 – 26 May 1703, President of the Royal Society (1684–1686)
Lucas Pepys	9 November 1780	26 May 1742 – 17 June 1830
William Haseldine Pepys	28 January 1808	23 March 1775 – 17 August 1856
John Perceval, 2nd Earl of Egmont	21 June 1764	25 February 1711 – ? 20 December 1770
Ian Colin Percival	21 March 1985	Physicist, London Univ.
John Perceval, 1st Earl of Egmont	3 December 1701	12 July 1683 – 1 May 1748
Thomas Percival	7 March 1765	29 September 1740 – 30 August 1804
Thomas Percival	25 November 1756	1 September 1719 – December 1762 Antiquarian
John Percivale	6 April 1681	22 August 1660 – 29 April 1686
Philip Percivale	18 February 1675	12 January 1656 – 11 September 1680
Algernon Percy, 4th Duke of Northumberland	9 April 1818	16 December 1792 – ? 15 February 1865
Henry George Percy, 7th Duke of Northumberland	22 November 1900	29 May 1846 – 14 May 1918
Hugh Algernon Percy, 10th Duke of Northumberland	28 May 1970	7 April 1914 – 11 October 1988 Statute
Hugh Percy, 1st Duke of Northumberland	10 June 1736	1715 – 6 June 1786
Hugh Percy, 2nd Duke of Northumberland	6 March 1788	28 August 1742 – 10 July 1817
Hugh Percy, 3rd Duke of Northumberland	1 May 1823	? 20 April 1785 – ? 12 February 1847
John Percy	22 April 1847	23 March 1817 – 19 June 1889 Metallurgist
Hélio Gelli Pereira	15 March 1973	23 September 1918 – 16 August 1994
Jacob Rodrigue Pereira	24 January 1760	11 April 1715 – 15 September 1780
Jonathan Pereira	3 May 1838	22 May 1804 – 20 January 1853
Herbert Charles Pereira	20 March 1969	12 May 1913 – 19 December 2004
Pedro Alonzo Perez de Guzman, Duke of Medina-Sidonia	9 November 1749	1724–1779
Richard Nelson Perham	15 March 1984	
Arthur George Perkin	11 June 1903	13 December 1861 – 30 May 1937
William Henry Perkin	7 June 1866	12 March 1838 – 14 July 1907
William Henry Perkin, Jr.	5 June 1890	17 June 1860 – 17 September 1929
Donald Hill Perkins	17 March 1966	
Edwin Arend Perkins	17 May 2007	
Peter Perkins	5 February 1680	– 1680
Robert Cyril Layton Perkins	13 May 1920	15 November 1866 – 29 September 1955
William Philp Perrin	28 May 1772	c. 1742 – 29 April 1820
Christopher Miles Perrins	15 May 1997	
Jean-Rodolphe Perronet	3 April 1788	9 October 1708 – 27 February 1794
John Perry	4 June 1885	15 February 1850 – 4 August 1920
Samuel Victor Perry	21 March 1974	
Stephen Joseph Perry	4 June 1874	26 August 1833 – 27 December 1889
Walter Laing Macdonald Perry, Baron Perry of Walton	21 March 1985	16 January 1921 – 16 July 2003
William Perry	30 November 1678	c. 1650 – September 1696 clergyman
William Persall	20 May 1663	7 October 1601 – Original
Geoffrey James Pert	9 March 1995	
Max Ferdinand Perutz	18 March 1954	19 May 1914 – 6 February 2002, chemist, Nobel Prize (1962)
Robin Noel Perutz	20 May 2010	
Joseph Ernest Petavel	2 May 1907	14 August 1873 – 31 March 1936
Norman James Petch	21 March 1974	14 February 1917 – 9 December 1992
Julian Peto	16 April 2019	
David Keith Peters	9 March 1995	
Rudolph Albert Peters	16 May 1935	13 April 1889 – 29 January 1982
Ole Holger Petersen	11 May 2000	
John Bernard Pethica	13 May 1999	
Jean Louis Petit	6 November 1729	13 March 1674 – 20 April 1750
John Lewis Petit	22 November 1759	1736 – 27 May 1780
Louis Hayes Petit	10 December 1807	? 1774 – 13 November 1849
Pierre Petit	4 April 1667	? 8 December 1594 – 20 August 1677 Physicist, Astronomer
James Petiver	27 November 1695	1663 – 2 April 1718
Charles Petley	22 February 1753	c. 1715 – July 1765
Richard Peto	16 March 1989	epidemiologist
Robert Edward Petre, 9th Baron Petre	6 April 1780	c. February 1742 – 2 July 1801
Robert James Petre, 8th Baron Petre	28 October 1731	3 June 1713 – 2 July 1742
William Henry Francis Petre, 11th Baron Petre	6 March 1817	22 January 1793 – 3 July 1850
William Matthew Flinders Petrie	5 June 1902	3 June 1853 – 28 July 1942
William Petrie	19 November 1795	fl 1795–1820
Michael Petrides	19 April 2012	
Peter Pett	20 May 1663	6 August 1610 – ? 1672 Original
Peter Pett	20 May 1663	? October 1630 – 1 April 1699 Original Lawyer
David Godfrey Pettifor	10 March 1994	
James Bell Pettigrew	4 June 1868	26 May 1834 – 30 January 1908
John Douglas Pettigrew	19 March 1987	
Thomas Joseph Pettigrew	1 February 1827	28 October 1791 – 23 November 1865
Max Pettini	20 May 2010	
Roger Pettiward	23 November 1815	fl 1815–1832
Roger Pettiward	20 March 1755	– 18 April 1774
John Pettus	19 August 1663	c. 1613 – ? July 1685
Henry Petty-Fitzmaurice, 3rd Marquess of Lansdowne	4 April 1811	2 July 1780 – 31 January 1863
Henry Petty, 1st Earl of Shelburne	30 November 1696	22 October 1675 – 17 April 1751
James Petty	6 June 1771	4 July 1822
William Petty	28 November 1660	26 May 1623 – 16 December 1687
Jean Andre Peysonnel	5 February 1756	19 June 1694 – ? 23 December 1758
Simon Peyton-Jones	29 April 2016	18 January 1958
Wilhelm Friedrich Philipp Pfeffer	25 November 1897	9 March 1845 – 31 January 1920
Leonard Bessemer Pfeil	15 March 1951	14 March 1898 – 16 February 1969
Baron Pfutschner	23 March 1732	fl 1732–1752
John Delafield Phelps	15 June 1815	c. 1765 – 19 December 1843 Barrister and antiquarian
Alexander Philip Wilson Philip	11 May 1826	15 October 1770 – ? 1851
Philip Duke of Edinburgh, consort of Queen Elizabeth II	3 May 1951	Statute
James Charles Philip	12 May 1921	13 February 1873 – 6 August 1941
John Robert Philip	21 March 1974	18 January 1927 – 26 June 1999
Erasmus Philipps	15 February 1727	8 November 1699 – 15 October 1743 MP for Haverfordwest
John Philipps	23 December 1742	1701 – 23 June 1764 MP for Carmarthen, etc.
Joseph Phillimore	13 February 1840	14 September 1775 – 24 January 1855
Thomas Phillipps	20 April 1820	2 July 1792 – 6 February 1872
Benjamin Phillips	18 December 1834	1805 – 11 June 1861 surgeon
Charles Phillips	5 March 1829	– 1840 Captain, Royal Navy
Charles Garrett Phillips	21 March 1963	13 October 1916 – 9 September 1994
David Phillips	1 May 2015	1939 - Chemist
David Chilton Phillips, Baron Phillips of Ellesmere	16 March 1967	8 March 1924 – 23 February 1999
John Phillips	10 April 1834	25 December 1800 – 24 April 1874
John Arthur Phillips	2 June 1881	19 February 1822 – 4 January 1887
John Guest Phillips	19 March 1981	13 June 1933 – 14 March 1987
Owen Martin Phillips	21 March 1968	30 December 1930 – 13 October 2010 Earth Scientist, John Hopkins
Richard Phillips	14 March 1822	1778 – 11 May 1851
Thomas Phillips	28 January 1819	18 October 1770 – 20 April 1845
William Phillips	15 November 1827	10 May 1775 – 2 April 1828
Augustus Phipps	5 March 1812	1762–1826
Constantine Phipps, 2nd Baron Mulgrave	12 December 1771	May 1744 – 10 October 1792
Giuseppe Piazzi	12 April 1804	16 July 1746 – 22 July 1826
Octavius Pickard-Cambridge	9 June 1887	3 November 1828 – 9 March 1917
Robert Howson Pickard	3 May 1917	27 September 1874 – 18 October 1949
Thomas Gerald Pickavance	18 March 1976	19 October 1915 – 12 November 1991
Percival Spencer Umfreville Pickering	5 June 1890	6 March 1858 – 5 December 1920
Roger Pickering	10 May 1744	c. 1720 – 18 May 1755
George White Pickering	24 March 1960	26 June 1904 – 3 September 1980
Jeremy David Pickett-Heaps	9 March 1995	
George Richard Pickett	15 May 1997	
John Anthony Pickett	14 March 1996	
Lillian Mary Pickford	17 March 1966	14 August 1902 – 14 August 2002
Marie Joseph Louis d'Albert d'Ailly Picquigny	15 March 1764	1741–1793
Marc-Auguste Pictet	5 May 1791	23 July 1752 – 19 April 1825
Henry Pierrepont, 1st Marquess of Dorchester	20 May 1663	March 1607 – December 1680 Original
Arthur Leary Piggott	18 January 1787	19 October 1749 – 6 September 1819 Barrister and MP
Jacobus Pighius	29 April 1680	1647 – ? December 1682
Thomas Pigot	18 December 1679	1657 – 14 August 1686
Granado Pigott	2 June 1774	– 18 September 1802
Nathaniel Pigott	16 January 1772	1725 – 30 May 1804
Edward Roy Pike	19 March 1981	
Jonathan Solomon Pila	1 May 2015	1962 - Mathematician
Henry Guy Ellcock Pilgrim	18 March 1943	24 December 1875 – 15 September 1943 Palaeontologist
Lionel Alexander Bethune Pilkington	20 March 1969	7 January 1920 – 5 May 1995
Colin Trevor Pillinger	11 March 1993	
Jonathon Pines	29 April 2016	Biologist
Alfred John Sutton Pippard	18 March 1954	6 April 1891 – 2 November 1969
Alfred Brian Pippard	15 March 1956	
Norman Wingate Pirie	17 March 1949	1 July 1907 – 29 March 1997
David Pitcairn	11 April 1782	1 May 1749 – 17 April 1809
William Pitcairn	10 May 1770	1711 – 25 November 1791
Alexander Pitfeild	19 November 1684	? 5 May 1658 – 19 October 1728
Henri Pitot	13 November 1740	31 May 1695 – 27 December 1771
Augustus Henry Lane Fox Pitt-Rivers	1 June 1876	14 April 1827 – 4 May 1900
Rosalind Venetia Pitt-Rivers	18 March 1954	4 March 1907 – 14 January 1990
John Pitt	9 November 1775	? 1706–1787
Robert Pitt	20 December 1682	1653 – ? 13 January 1713
Harry Raymond Pitt	21 March 1957	3 June 1914 – 8 October 2005
William Morton Pitt	25 January 1787	17 May 1754 – 28 February 1836 MP for Poole & Dorset
William Pitt, 1st Earl of Chatham	26 January 1744	15 November 1708 – 11 May 1778
Andrew Joseph Planta	15 March 1770	– 1773
Joseph Planta	17 February 1774	22 February 1744 – 3 December 1827 (Librarian)
Harry Hemley Plaskett	7 May 1936	5 July 1893 – 26 January 1980
John Stanley Plaskett	3 May 1923	17 November 1865 – 17 October 1941
Joshua Platt	23 December 1762	c. 1696 – 26 December 1776
Trevor Charles Platt	14 May 1998	
Thomas Alexander Evelyn Platts-Mills	20 May 2010	
Thomas Player	27 November 1673	– 14 January 1686
John Playfair	5 February 1807	10 March 1748 – 20 July 1819
Lyon Playfair, 1st Baron Playfair	9 June 1848	21 May 1818 – 29 May 1898
Edward Pleydell-Bouverie	19 February 1863	26 April 1818 – 16 December 1889
Jacob Pleydell-Bouverie, 2nd Earl of Radnor	12 February 1795	4 March 1750 – 27 January 1828
Henry George Plimmer	5 May 1910	29 January 1856 – 22 June 1918
Robert Plot	6 December 1677	? December 1640 – 30 April 1696
Gordon David Plotkin	12 March 1992	
William Henry Chicheley Plowden	15 April 1847	? 21 April 1787 – 29 March 1880
Walter Plowright	19 March 1981	23 July 1923 – 19 February 2010 Microbiologist
Raymond Alan Plumb	14 May 1998	
Thomas Plumer	6 March 1794	10 October 1753 – 24 March 1824
Henry Crozier Keating Plummer	13 May 1920	24 October 1875 – 30 September 1946
Henry Plumptre	1 December 1707	– 26 November 1746
Horace Curzon Plunkett	19 June 1902	24 October 1854 – 26 March 1932
Thomas Pockley	11 September 1661	– 1661 Original
Henry Cabourn Pocklington	2 May 1907	28 January 1870 – 15 May 1952
Reginald Innes Pocock	4 May 1911	4 March 1863 – 9 August 1947
George Pocock	10 March 1791	15 October 1765 – 14 July 1840 MP Bridgwater
Thomas Pocock	22 February 1727	15 June 1672–1745 Clergyman
Richard Pococke	11 February 1742	1704 – September 1765
Marcin Odlanicki Poczobutt	30 May 1771	31 October 1728 – 8 February 1810
Joseph Louis de Podmaniczky	8 June 1780	29 July 1756 – 11 May 1823
Siméon Denis Poisson	12 March 1818	21 June 1781 – 25 April 1840
Pierre Isaac Poissonnier	2 June 1774	5 July 1720 – 15 September 1798 Physician and Chemist
Paul Emanuel Polani	15 March 1973	
John Charles Polanyi	18 March 1971	chemist, Nobel Prize (1986)
Michael Polanyi	16 March 1944	13 March 1891 – 22 February 1976, chemist and philosopher
Reginald Pole-Carew	24 April 1788	28 July 1753 – 3 January 1835
Charles Morice Pole	29 May 1800	18 January 1757 – 6 September 1830
William Pole	6 June 1861	22 April 1814 – 30 December 1900
William Pole	9 April 1829	6 July 1798 – 29 July 1884 Barrister
Giovanni, Marquis Poleni	30 November 1710	23 August 1683 – ? 14 November 1761
Richard Poley	15 April 1725	– 23 January 1770
Ernest John Christopher Polge	17 March 1983	16 August 1926 – 17 August 2006
Joseph Poli	6 May 1779	? 24 October 1746 – 7 April 1825
Martyn Poliakoff	9 May 2002	
John Charlton Polkinghorne	21 March 1974	
James Arthur Pollock	11 May 1916	17 November 1865 – 24 May 1922
Martin Rivers Pollock	15 March 1962	10 December 1914 – 21 December 1999
David Pollock	9 April 1829	2 September 1780 – 22 May 1847
Jonathan Frederick Pollock	29 February 1816	23 September 1783 – 23 August 1870
Allan Pollok	22 January 1767	– 1803
Arthur Pond	28 May 1752	c. 1705 – 9 September 1758 Portrait Painter
John Pond	26 February 1807	1767 – 7 September 1836
Bruce Anthony John Ponder	10 May 2001	
Michael Poniatowski	31 March 1791	1736 – 12 August 1794 Royal
Stanislaus Augustus Pontiatowski, King of Poland	11 December 1766	1733 – 12 February 1798 Royal Fellow
William Francis Spencer Ponsonby, 1st Baron de Mauley	2 February 1832	31 July 1787 – 16 May 1855
Guido Pontecorvo	17 March 1955	29 November 1907 – 25 September 1999
Edward Poore	9 July 1772	1745–1803
William Jackson Pope	5 June 1902	? 31 March 1870 – 17 October 1939
Stephen Bailey Pope	17 May 2007	
Walter Pope	20 May 1663	c. 1627 – 25 June 1714 Original
Sandu Popescu	4 May 2017	
Home Riggs Popham	18 April 1799	12 October 1762 – 10 September 1820
George Joseph Popjak	16 March 1961	5 May 1914 – 30 December 1998
John Anthony Pople	16 March 1961	31 October 1925 – 15 March 2004
Karl Raimund Popper	17 June 1976	29 July 1902 – 17 September 1994 Statute, philosopher of science
Henry Popple	28 April 1737	– 27 September 1743
Robert Porrett	9 June 1848	22 September 1783 – 25 November 1868
Alfred William Porter	4 May 1911	12 November 1863 – 11 January 1939
George Richardson Porter	18 January 1838	29 June 1790 – 3 September 1852
George Porter, Baron Porter of Luddenham	24 March 1960	6 December 1920 – 31 August 2002
Helen Kemp Porter	15 March 1956	10 November 1899 – 7 December 1987
James Porter	11 May 1749	1710 – 9 December 1776 Diplomat and mathematician
Rodney Robert Porter	19 March 1964	8 October 1917 – 6 September 1985
Joseph Ellison Portlock	8 June 1837	30 September 1794 – 14 February 1864
Sir William Portman, 6th Baronet	28 December 1664	5 September 1643 – 20 March 1690
Benito de Moura Portuga	5 February 1741	1702–1776
Adrian Frank Posnette	18 March 1971	11 January 1914 – 17 July 2004
George Henry Poste	15 May 1997	
John Raymond Postgate	17 March 1977	Microbiologist
James Postlethwayt	7 February 1754	6 September 1761
Percivall Pott	5 April 1764	6 January 1714 – 22 December 1788
Edmund Potter	5 June 1856	1802 – 26 October 1883
Francis Potter	18 March 1663	29 May 1594 – April 1678
Thomas Potter	16 December 1784	1740 – 14 November 1801
John Poulett, 1st Earl Poulett	29 January 1713	? 1668 – 28 May 1743
Edward Bagnall Poulton	6 June 1889	27 January 1856 – 20 November 1943
James Pound	20 December 1699	1669 – 16 November 1724
Kenneth Alwyne Pounds	19 March 1981	
Thomas Povey	20 May 1663	c. 1615 – c. 1702 Original
Alan Richard Powell	19 March 1953	6 March 1894 – 11 October 1975
Baden Powell	13 May 1824	22 August 1796 – 11 June 1860
Cecil Frank Powell	17 March 1949	5 December 1903 – 9 August 1969
Herbert Marcus Powell	19 March 1953	7 August 1906 – 10 March 1991
Michael James David Powell	17 March 1983	
Roger Powell	1 May 2015	14/06/1949- Professor of Earth Sciences
Thomas Philip Stroud Powell	16 March 1978	14 July 1923 – 8 February 1996
William Samuel Powell	16 February 1764	27 September 1717 – 19 January 1775
Henry Power	1 July 1663	1623 – 23 December 1668
Philip Power	26 May 2005	
William Henry Power	13 June 1895	15 December 1842 – 28 July 1916
Henry Powle	20 May 1663	? October 1630 – 21 November 1692 Original
Richard Powle	20 May 1663	? July 1628 – ? July 1678 Original
Thomas Pownall	9 April 1772	1723 – 25 February 1805
Fiona Margaret Powrie	19 May 2011	
Littleton Powys	30 November 1724	c. 1648 – 16 March 1732
John Henry Poynting	7 June 1888	9 September 1852 – 30 March 1914
David Prain	11 May 1905	11 July 1857 – 16 March 1944
Ghillean Tolmie Prance	11 March 1993	
Benjamin Pratt	7 April 1708	3 May 1715 Curate
Charles Pratt, 1st Earl Camden	8 April 1742	? March 1714 – 18 April 1794
John Henry Pratt	7 June 1866	4 June 1809 – 28 December 1871
Samuel Peace Pratt	27 January 1842	6 November 1789 – 22 September 1863
William Henry Preece	2 June 1881	16 February 1834 – 6 November 1913
David Preiss	27 May 2004	
Vladimir Prelog	3 May 1962	23 July 1906 – 6 January 1998
Colin Prentice	9 May 2018	1952
James Arthur Prescott	15 March 1951	8 October 1890 – 6 February 1987
Jacob Preston	17 June 1773	– 23 October 1787
Reginald Dawson Preston	18 March 1954	21 July 1908 – 3 May 2000
Thomas Preston	9 June 1898	23 May 1860 – 7 March 1900
William Preston	25 June 1778	– 19 April 1789 Bishop of Leighlin and Ferns
Joseph Prestwich	2 June 1853	12 March 1812 – 23 June 1896
Bartholomew Price	3 June 1852	14 May 1818 – 29 December 1898
James Price	10 May 1781	1752 – ? 8 August 1783
Richard Price	5 December 1765	24 February 1723 – 19 April 1791
Richard Parry Price	3 May 1781	1738 – 14 May 1782
Sarah (Sally) Price	5 May 2017	
Thomas Slater Price	15 May 1924	24 August 1875 – 29 October 1949 Physical chemist
William Price	22 March 1753	fl 1752–1771
William Charles Price	19 March 1959	1 April 1909 – 10 March 1993
William Geraint Price	17 March 1988	
James Cowles Prichard	8 February 1827	12 February 1786 – ? 23 December 1848
Benjamin Prideaux	11 December 1746	– 22 July 1795
Eric Ronald Priest	9 May 2002	
Charles Henry Brian Priestley	16 March 1967	8 July 1915 – 18 May 1998
Joseph Priestley	12 June 1766	14 March 1733 – 6 February 1804
Samuel Prime	21 March 1776	fl 1776–1788
Archibald John Primrose, 4th Earl of Rosebery	1 April 1819	14 October 1783 – 4 March 1868
Archibald Philip Primrose, 5th Earl of Rosebery	10 June 1886	7 May 1847 – 21 May 1929
John William Sutton Pringle	18 March 1954	22 July 1912 – 2 November 1982
Robert Pringle	28 April 1785	– 17 June 1793
John Pringle	31 October 1745	10 April 1707 – 18 January 1782
James Prinsep	20 November 1828	1799 – 22 April 1840
George Thurland Prior	2 May 1912	16 December 1862 – 8 March 1936
Matthew Prior	23 March 1698	21 July 1664 – 18 September 1721
Charles Pritchard	6 February 1840	30 February 1808 – 28 May 1893
Joseph Privat de Molières	16 January 1729	1677 – 12 May 1742
Henry Proby	20 May 1663	fl 1646–1664 Original
John Joshua Proby, 1st Earl of Carysfort	4 February 1779	12 August 1751 – 7 April 1828
Henry Richardson Procter	3 May 1923	6 May 1848 – 17 August 1927
Michael Richard Edward Proctor	18 May 2006	
James I. Prosser	29 April 2016	Ecologist
Nicholas Jarvis Proudfoot	26 May 2005	
Joseph Proudman	7 May 1925	30 December 1888 – 26 June 1975
William Prout	11 March 1819	15 January 1785 – 9 April 1850
Maurice Henry Lecorney Pryce	15 March 1951	24 January 1913 – 24 July 2003
Abraham de la Pryme	18 March 1702	15 January 1672 – 13 June 1704
Richard John Puddephatt	14 May 1998	
William John Pugh	15 March 1951	28 July 1892 – 18 March 1974
Alfred Grenville Pugsley	20 March 1952	13 May 1903 – 7 March 1998
Moise Pujolas	18 December 1695	? 1729
Richard Pulteney	25 November 1762	18 February 1730 – 13 October 1801
William Pulteney, 1st Earl of Bath	15 November 1744	22 March 1684 – ? 8 July 1764
Richard Julius Pumphrey	16 March 1950	3 September 1906 – 25 August 1967
Reginald Crundall Punnett	2 May 1912	20 June 1875 – 3 January 1967
Thomas Purdie	13 June 1895	27 January 1843 – 14 December 1916
Apollon Moussin Puschkin	14 November 1799	1760 – 1805
Peter Nicholas Pusey	14 March 1996	
Philip Pusey	27 May 1830	25 June 1799 – 9 July 1855
Henry Putman	8 January 1767	1 March 1797
Philip Henry Pye-Smith	4 June 1886	30 August 1839 – 23 May 1914
David Randall Pye	6 May 1937	30 April 1886 – 20 February 1960
Sir Robert Pye	11 January 1727	c. 1696 – 23 May 1734 Clergyman/Baronet
John Adrian Pyle	27 May 2004	
Frank Lee Pyman	11 May 1922	9 April 1882 – 1 January 1944

=== Q ===
Name	Election date	Notes
Richard Quain	29 February 1844	July 1800 – 15 September 1887
Sir Richard Quain	8 June 1871	30 October 1816 – 13 March 1898
Juda Hirsch Quastel	14 March 1940	2 October 1899 – 16 October 1987, biochemist
William Quatremain	20 May 1663	c. 1618 – ? June 1667 Original
John Rodney Quayle	16 March 1978	
John Thomas Quekett	7 June 1860	11 August 1815 – 20 August 1861
François Quesnay	28 May 1752	? 4 June 1694 – ? 16 December 1774
Terence John Quinn	9 May 2002	

=== R ===
Name	Election date	Notes
Terence Howard Rabbitts	19 March 1987	
Benton Seymour Rabinovitch	19 March 1987	19 February 1919 – 2 August 2014 chemist
Robert Russell Race	20 March 1952	28 November 1907 – 15 April 1984 geneticist
Thomas Rackett	17 February 1803	1756 – 29 November 1840
George Karoly Radda	20 March 1980	
Sheena Radford	30 April 2014	
Richard Rado	16 March 1978	28 April 1906 – 23 December 1989, combinatorics, graph theory
John Rae	3 June 1880	30 September 1813 – 22 July 1893
Martin Charles Raff	21 March 1985	
Thomas Stamford Bingley Raffles	20 March 1817	? 5 July 1781 – 5 July 1826
Michael Augustine Raftery	20 March 1986	
Madabusi Santanam Raghunathan	11 May 2000	
Atta ur Rahman	18 May 2006	
Matthew Raine	17 February 1803	20 May 1760 – 17 September 1811
Reginald Charles Rainey	20 March 1975	18 June 1913 – 18 January 1990
Peter Rainger	18 March 1982	
John Spratt Rainier	28 January 1819	– 13 November 1822
Charles Rainsford	13 May 1779	4 February 1728 – 24 May 1809
Geoffrey Raisman	10 May 2001	
Harold Raistrick	3 May 1934	26 November 1890 – 8 March 1971
Gopalasamudram Narayana Ramachandran	17 March 1977	8 October 1922 – 7 April 2001
Robert Ramage	12 March 1992	Chemist
Tiruppattur Venkatachalamurti Ramakrishnan	11 May 2000	
Lalita Ramakrishnan	9 May 2018	1959 –
Venkatraman Ramakrishnan	15 May 2003	
Vulimiri Ramalingaswami	20 March 1986	8 August 1921 – 28 May 2001
Chandrasekhara Venkata Raman	15 May 1924	7 November 1888 – 21 November 1970, Nobel Laureate in physics (1929) President
Srinivasa Aaiyangar Ramanujan	2 May 1918	22 December 1887 – 26 April 1920
Sriram Ramaswamy	29 April 2016	Biological physicist
Arthur Alcock Rambaut	14 June 1900	21 September 1859 – 14 October 1923
Andrew Crombie Ramsay	7 June 1849	31 January 1814 – 9 December 1891
Andrew Michael Ramsay	11 December 1729	9 July 1686 – 6 May 1743
Donald Allan Ramsay	16 March 1978	
James Arthur Ramsay	17 March 1955	6 September 1909 – 4 February 1988 Zoologist, Cambridge UNiv.
John G. Ramsay	15 March 1973	
William Ramsay	7 June 1888	2 October 1852 – 23 July 1916
John Ramsbottom	24 June 1819	8 October 1845
Jesse Ramsden	12 January 1786	6 October 1735 – 5 November 1800
John Ranby	30 November 1724	1703 – 28 August 1773
Isaac Rand	5 November 1719	1674–1743
John Turton Randall	21 March 1946	23 March 1905 – 16 June 1984
Philip John Randle	17 March 1983	16 July 1926 – 26 September 2006
John Randolph, Bishop of London	19 December 1811	6 July 1749 – 28 July 1813
Mark Felton Randolph	19 May 2011	
Humphrey Peter Rang	20 March 1980	
Alexander Oliver Rankine	3 May 1934	8 December 1881 – ? 19 January 1956
William John Macquorn Rankine	2 June 1853	5 July 1820 – 24 December 1872
William Henry Ransom	2 June 1870	19 November 1824 – 16 April 1907 Physician and Geologist
Arthur Ransome	12 June 1884	12 February 1834 – 25 July 1922
Calyampudi Radhakrishna Rao	16 March 1967	
Chintamani Nagesa Ramachandra Rao	18 March 1982	1934-
Henry Stanley Raper	2 May 1929	5 March 1882 – 12 December 1951
Matthew Raper	30 May 1754	– 1778
Matthew Raper	6 March 1783	1742 – 26 November 1826 Antiquarian
Ralph Alexander Raphael	15 March 1962	1 January 1921 – 27 April 1998
Joseph Raphson	30 November 1689	? 1716
John G. Rarity	1 May 2015	Professor of optical communication systems
Philip Rashleigh	29 May 1788	28 December 1729 – 26 June 1811, mineralogist
William Rashleigh	15 December 1814	11 January 1777 – 14 May 1855
Rudolf Eric Raspe	1 June 1769	1737–1794 Expelled for fraud, 1775
John Urpeth Rastrick	19 January 1837	26 January 1780 – 1 November 1856
Cyrille Grigoryevitch Rasumousky	24 April 1755	28 March 1726–1803
John Ashworth Ratcliffe	15 March 1951	12 December 1902 – 25 October 1987
Peter John Ratcliffe	9 May 2002	
Joseph Raulin	12 May 1763	19 March 1708 – 12 April 1784
David Ravaud	21 May 1747	28 September 1718 – 18 November 1776
John Albert Raven	15 March 1990	
Gordon Hindle Rawcliffe	16 March 1972	2 June 1910 – 3 September 1979
Francis Rawdon Hastings, 1st Marquess of Hastings and 2nd Earl of Moira	3 May 1787	9 December 1754 – 28 November 1826
John Rawdon, 1st Earl of Moira	12 April 1744	17 March 1720 – 20 June 1793
Giles Rawlins	26 December 1660	– 18 August 1662 Original
Henry Creswicke Rawlinson	6 June 1850	11 April 1810 – 5 March 1895
Richard Rawlinson	29 July 1714	3 January 1690 – 6 April 1755
Thomas Rawlinson	23 October 1712	25 March 1681 – 6 August 1725 London barrister
Walter Rawlinson	30 March 1775	– 13 March 1805
John Ray	7 November 1667	29 November 1627 – 17 January 1705
Robert Raymond, 2nd Baron Raymond	7 February 1740	c. 1717 – 19 September 1756
Guillaume Thomas Raynal	30 May 1754	12 April 1713 – 6 March 1796
Edward Peter Raynes	19 March 1987	
Geoffrey Vincent Raynor	19 March 1959	2 October 1913 – 20 October 1983
Andrew Fraser Read	1 May 2015	Biologist
David John Read	15 March 1990	Botanist
Frank Henry Read	15 March 1984	
Herbert Harold Read	16 March 1939	17 December 1889 – 29 March 1970
John Read	16 May 1935	18 February 1884 – 21 January 1963
Randy Read	30 April 2014	Professor of Protein Crystallography, University of Cambridge
Henry Reade	21 January 1748	1716 – 13 December 1762
Joseph Bancroft Reade	8 February 1838	5 April 1801 – 12 December 1870
Robert Reading	2 November 1671	c. 1640 – ? March 1689
Richard Edmund Reason	18 March 1971	21 December 1903 – 20 March 1987
Rene-Antoine Ferchault de Reaumur	9 November 1738	29 February 1683 – ? 17 October 1757
Giambattista Recanati	30 June 1720	19 September 1687 – 16 or 17 November 1734
Sigismund Ehrenreich Redern	14 November 1765	1720 – 1 July 1789
Roderick Oliver Redman	21 March 1946	17 July 1905 – 6 March 1975
Edward James Reed	1 June 1876	20 September 1830 – 30 November 1906
Abraham Rees	1 June 1786	1743 – 9 June 1825
Charles Wayne Rees	21 March 1974	15 October 1927 – 21 September 2006
David Rees	21 March 1968	29 May 1918 – 16 August 2013 Mathematician
David Allan Rees	19 March 1981	Chemist
Florence Gwendolen Rees	18 March 1971	3 July 1906 – 4 October 1994
George Owen Rees	2 February 1843	November 1813 – 27 May 1889
Hubert Rees	18 March 1976	
Martin Rees, Baron Rees of Ludlow	15 March 1979	
Susan Mary Rees	9 May 2002	
Colin Bernard Reese	19 March 1981	
John Reeves	12 June 1817	1 May 1774 – 22 March 1856 naturalist
John Reeves	18 March 1790	? 1752 – 7 August 1829
John Russell Reeves	6 February 1834	10 January 1804 – 1 May 1877
Charles Tate Regan	3 May 1917	2 February 1878 – 12 January 1943
Edward Reich	19 March 1981	Biochemist
Clement Reid	1 June 1899	6 January 1853 – 10 December 1916
Edward Waymouth Reid	9 June 1898	11 October 1862 – 10 March 1948
Kenneth Bannerman Milne Reid	15 May 1997	
Miles Anthony Reid	9 May 2002	
Nancy Reid	9 May 2018	17 September 1952 –
Thomas Reid	18 December 1806	April 1824 Director East India Company
William Reid	21 February 1839	25 April 1791 – 31 October 1858
Wolf Reik	20 May 2010	
Arnold William Reinold	7 June 1883	19 June 1843 – 11 April 1921
Caetano Reis e Sousa	16 April 2019	
Ernest Frederick Relf	7 May 1936	2 October 1888 – 25 February 1970
Richard Relhan	6 December 1787	1754 – 28 March 1823
James Meadows Rendel	23 February 1843	December 1799 – 21 November 1856
Alfred Barton Rendle	6 May 1909	19 January 1865 – 11 January 1938
James Rennell	8 March 1781	3 December 1742 – 29 March 1830
Thomas Rennell	25 April 1822	9 February 1754 – 31 March 1840
George Rennie	21 March 1822	3 December 1791 – 30 March 1866
James Rennie	22 May 1845	27 February 1787 – 25 August 1867
John Rennie the Elder	29 March 1798	7 June 1761 – 4 October 1821
John Rennie the Younger	12 June 1823	30 August 1794 – 3 September 1874
Didacus de Revillas	13 June 1734	fl 1734
Bullen Reymes	17 October 1667	28 December 1613 – 18 December 1672
Samuel Reynardson	11 March 1742	1704 – 18 November 1797
Edward Osmund Royle Reynolds	11 March 1993	
Henry Revell Reynolds	17 May 1781	26 September 1745 – 22 October 1811
James Emerson Reynolds	3 June 1880	9 January 1844 – ? 18 February 1920
John Russell Reynolds	3 June 1869	22 May 1828 – 29 May 1896
Joshua Reynolds	15 January 1761	17 July 1723 – 23 February 1792
Osborne Reynolds	7 June 1877	24 August 1842 – 21 February 1912
Abondio Rezzonico	6 June 1776	1742–1815
David William Rhind	9 May 2002	
Daniela Rhodes	17 May 2007	
John David Rhodes	11 March 1993	
Harry Ralph Ricardo	2 May 1929	26 January 1885 – 18 May 1974
Thomas Maurice Rice	9 May 2002	
Thomas Spring Rice, 1st Baron Monteagle	29 April 1841	9 February 1790 – 7 February 1866
Daniel Rich	16 June 1743	c. 1711–1768
Francis John Richards	18 March 1954	1 October 1901 – 2 January 1965
George Henry Richards	7 June 1866	13 January 1820 – 14 November 1896
Graham Richards	9 May 2018	1 October 1939
Owain Westmacott Richards	19 March 1959	31 December 1901 – 9 November 1984
Rex Edward Richards	19 March 1959	
Richard Richards	14 February 1793	5 November 1752 – 11 November 1823
Archibald Read Richardson	21 March 1946	21 August 1881 – 4 November 1954
Benjamin Ward Richardson	6 June 1867	31 October 1828 – 21 November 1896
David Richardson	9 May 2018	
Frederick Denys Richardson	21 March 1968	17 September 1913 – 8 September 1983
Guy Peel Richardson	15 May 2009	
John Richardson	24 February 1825	5 November 1787 – 5 June 1865
Lewis Fry Richardson	6 May 1926	11 October 1881 – 30 September 1953
Owen Willans Richardson	1 May 1913	27 April 1879 – 15 February 1959
Peter Damian Richardson	20 March 1986	
Richard Richardson	23 October 1712	6 September 1663 – 21 April 1741 Yorkshire Botanist
Robert Richardson	25 February 1779	1732 – 27 September 1781 Prebendary Lincoln Cathedral
Thomas Richardson	7 June 1866	8 October 1816 – 10 July 1867 Chemist, Durham Univ
James Ernest Richey	17 March 1938	24 April 1886 – 19 June 1968
Herbert William Richmond	4 May 1911	17 July 1863 – 22 April 1948 Mathematician, King's College
Mark Henry Richmond	20 March 1980	
Charles Milner Ricketts	23 March 1820	21 April 1776 – 7 September 1867
Alan Bernard Rickinson	15 May 1997	
John Rickman	27 April 1815	22 August 1771 – 11 August 1840
Charles James Buchanan Riddell	13 January 1842	19 November 1817 – 25 January 1903
Eric Keightley Rideal	15 May 1930	11 April 1890 – 25 September 1974
George Ridge	5 July 1810	– 17 October 1824
Anne Ridley	5 May 2017	
Brian Kidd Ridley	10 March 1994	
Henry Nicholas Ridley	2 May 1907	10 December 1855 – 24 October 1956
Nicholas Harold Lloyd Ridley	20 March 1986	10 July 1906 – 25 May 2001
Loren Henry Rieseberg	20 May 2010	
Stephen Peter Rigaud	13 June 1805	12 August 1774 – 16 March 1839
Peter William Jack Rigby	20 May 2010	Molecular Biologist
Robert Rigg	25 April 1839	4 June 1792 – 26 February 1861
Ralph Riley	16 March 1967	23 October 1924 – 27 August 1999
Claude Rimington	18 March 1954	17 November 1902 – 8 August 1993
Sydney Ringer	4 June 1885	1835 – 14 October 1910
John Robert Ringrose	17 March 1977	
Alfred Edward Ringwood	16 March 1972	19 April 1930 – 12 November 1993
Falco Rinuccini	26 March 1747	fl 1747
Edward Riou	5 May 1796	c. 1758 – April 1801
Ludovicus a Ripa	3 July 1718	– 1746
John Rishbeth	21 March 1974	10 July 1918 – 1 June 1991
Joseph Murdoch Ritchie	18 March 1976	
William Ritchie	8 May 1828	c. 1790 – 15 September 1837
David Rittenhouse	16 April 1795	8 April 1732 – 26 June 1796
William Halse Rivers Rivers	7 May 1908	12 March 1864 – 4 June 1922
Albert Cherbury David Rivett	20 March 1941	4 December 1885 – 1 April 1961
August Quirinus Rivinus	30 November 1703	9 December 1652 – 30 December 1723
John van Rixtel	20 December 1739	– 1774
David Riz	5 June 1766	fl 1766–1783
Ezio Rizzardo	20 May 2010	
Charles Bodvile Robartes, 2nd Earl of Radnor	30 November 1693	26 July 1660 – 3 August 1723
Francis Robartes	11 December 1673	? January 1650 – 3 February 1718
John Robartes, 1st Earl of Radnor and Viscount Bodmin	14 November 1666	1606 – 17 July 1685
John Robartes, 4th Earl of Radnor	16 March 1732	c. 1686 – 15 July 1757
Russell Robartes	30 November 1703	c. 1672–1724 MP for Bodmin
Alfred Arthur Robb	12 May 1921	18 January 1873 – 13 December 1936
Michael Alfred Robb	11 May 2000	
Trevor William Robbins	26 May 2005	
William Chandler Roberts-Austen	3 June 1875	3 March 1843 – 22 November 1902
Alan Madoc Roberts	1 May 2015	1941 - Zoologist
Derek Harry Roberts	20 March 1980	
Edward Roberts	12 December 1799	c. 1763 – 21 November 1846 Physician St Barts
Gareth Gwyn Roberts	15 March 1984	16 May 1940 – 6 February 2007
Gilbert Roberts	18 March 1965	19 February 1899 – 1 January 1978
Isaac Roberts	5 June 1890	27 January 1829 – 17 July 1904
John Alexander Fraser Roberts	21 March 1963	8 September 1899 – 15 January 1987
John Keith Roberts	19 March 1942	16 April 1897 – 26 April 1944
Lewis Edward John Roberts	18 March 1982	31 January 1922 - 10 April 2012
Paul Harry Roberts	15 March 1979	
Richard John Roberts	9 March 1995	
Roger Elliot Roberts	4 June 1801	c. 1753 – 9 August 1831
Samuel Roberts	6 June 1878	15 December 1827 – 18 September 1913 Solicitor
William Roberts	7 June 1877	18 March 1830 – 16 April 1899
Abraham Robertson	21 May 1795	4 November 1751 – 4 December 1826
Alan Robertson	19 March 1964	22 February 1920 – 25 April 1989
Alexander Robertson	20 March 1941	13 February 1896 – 9 February 1970 Prof of Chemistry, Liverpool Univ
Andrew Robertson	14 March 1940	30 January 1883 – 22 October 1977 Engineer
Archibald Robertson	11 February 1836	3 December 1789 – 19 October 1864
Elizabeth Jane Robertson	15 May 2003	
James Robertson	13 December 1810	fl 1810–1830 Surveyor
John Robertson	17 December 1741	1712 – 11 December 1776 Royal Soc Librarian
John Robertson	1 May 2015	1950 - Professor of Electronics
John Monteath Robertson	22 March 1945	24 July 1900 – 27 December 1989
Muriel Robertson	20 March 1947	8 April 1883 – 14 June 1973
Robert Robertson	31 May 1804	1742–1829 physician
Robert Robertson	3 May 1917	17 April 1869 – 28 April 1949 chemist
Rutherford Ness Robertson	16 March 1961	29 September 1913 – 5 March 2001
Thomas Robie	15 April 1725	20 March 1689 – 28 August 1729
Benjamin Robins	9 November 1727	1707 – 29 July 1751
Carol Vivien Robinson	27 May 2004	
Derek Charles Robinson	10 March 1994	27 May 1941 – 2 December 2002
Frederick John Robinson, 1st Earl of Ripon	17 April 1828	30 October 1782 – 28 January 1859
George Frederick Samuel Robinson, 1st Marquess of Ripon	24 May 1860	24 October 1827 – 9 July 1909
Gilbert Wooding Robinson	18 March 1948	7 November 1888 – 6 May 1950
Harold Roper Robinson	2 May 1929	26 November 1889 – 28 November 1955
Isaac Robinson	26 November 1829	– 26 May 1839
Margaret Scott Robinson	19 April 2012	Molecular Biologist
Richard Robinson	23 November 1681	– 30 January 1733 Physician
Robert Robinson	13 May 1920	13 September 1886 – 8 February 1975
Robert Spencer Robinson	3 June 1869	6 January 1809 – 27 July 1889
Stephen Joseph Robinson	18 March 1976	
Tancred Robinson	19 November 1684	c. 1657 – 29 March 1748
Thomas Robinson	30 November 1726	c. 1703 – 3 March 1777
Thomas Romney Robinson	5 June 1856	23 April 1792 – 28 February 1882
Robert Robison	15 May 1930	29 December 1883 – 18 June 1941
John Gair Robson	15 May 2003	
Peter Neville Robson	19 March 1987	23 November 1930 – 10 January 2010 Prof of Electronic Engineering, Sheffield
George Dixon Rochester	20 March 1958	5 February 1908 – 26 December 2001
John Davison Rockefeller	8 June 1939	30 January 1874 – 11 May 1960 Statute
John Rodenburg	16 April 2019	
Richard Roderick	21 June 1750	– 20 July 1756
John Roebuck	12 July 1764	1718 – 17 July 1794
Arthur William Rogers	2 May 1918	5 June 1872 – 23 June 1946
Charles Rogers	17 November 1757	2 August 1711 – 2 January 1784
Claude Ambrose Rogers	19 March 1959	1 November 1920 – 5 December 2005
George Rogers	19 November 1789	fl 1789–1816 Royal Navy Commissioner
Henry Darwin Rogers	3 June 1858	1 August 1808 – 29 May 1866
John Rogers	5 December 1839	9 November 1807 – 12 August 1867 Naturalist
John Rogers	13 April 1681	18 February 1647 – 9 May 1715 Clergyman
Joseph Rogers	15 June 1738	c. 1676 – ? 1757 Physician
Leonard James Rogers	15 May 1924	30 March 1862 – 12 September 1933
Samuel Rogers	17 November 1796	30 July 1763 – 18 December 1855
Leonard Rogers	11 May 1916	18 January 1868 – 16 September 1962
John Rogerson	6 May 1779	1741 – 21 December 1823 Physician to Catherine the Great
Peter Mark Roget	16 March 1815	18 January 1779 – 12 September 1869
Werner Wolfgang Rogosinski	18 March 1954	24 September 1894 – 23 July 1964
Ivan Maurice Roitt	17 March 1983	immunologist
John Gage Rokewode	8 April 1824	13 September 1786 – 14 October 1842
George Rolleston	5 June 1862	30 July 1829 – 16 June 1881
Paolo Antonio Rolli	11 December 1729	1687 – ? 1767
Thomas Rolt	14 December 1664	? January 1641 – ? October 1672
George John Romanes	12 June 1879	? 20 May 1848 – 23 May 1894
Robert Romer	14 December 1899	23 December 1840 – 19 March 1918
Isaac Romilly	12 May 1757	– 1759
David Ron	30 April 2014	Professor of Cellular Pathophysiology, Cambridge University
Francis Ronalds	1 February 1844	22 February 1788 – 8 August 1873
Denis Eric Rooke	16 March 1978	
Lawrence Rooke	30 November 1660	13 March 1622 – 7 July 1662 Founder member
Thomas Gerald Room	20 March 1941	10 November 1902 – 2 April 1986
John Frederick Fitzgerald De Roos	9 June 1831	6 March 1804 – 19 June 1861
Warren Richard Roper	16 March 1989	
Patrik Rorsman	30 April 2014	Professor of Diabetic Medicine, Oxford University
Henry Enfield Roscoe	4 June 1863	7 January 1833 – 18 December 1915
Francis Leslie Rose	21 March 1957	27 June 1909 – 2 March 1988
John Donald Rose	18 March 1971	2 January 1911 – 14 October 1976
George Rose	5 June 1834	1 May 1782 – 3 December 1873
William Rose	23 November 1786	1 January 1751 – 2 April 1829 Rector of Beckenham
Howard Harry Rosenbrock	18 March 1976	16 December 1920 – 21 October 2010 Prof of Control Engineering, Manchester
Walter Rosenhain	1 May 1913	24 August 1875 – 17 March 1934
Louis Rosenhead	21 March 1946	1 January 1906 – 10 November 1984
Max Leonard Rosenheim, Baron Rosenheim of Camden	25 May 1972	15 March 1908 – 2 December 1972
Otto Rosenheim	12 May 1927	29 November 1871 – 7 May 1955
Iver Rosenkrantz	11 June 1713	5 December 1674 – 13 November 1745
Daniel Ross	13 June 1822	11 November 1780 – 29 October 1849
Douglas Alan Ross	26 May 2005	physicist
Graham Garland Ross	14 March 1991	
James Clark Ross	11 December 1828	15 April 1800 – 3 April 1862
John Ross	23 February 1758	? 24 June 1719 – 14 August 1792
Patrick Ross	11 December 1794	c. 1740 – 24 August 1804 Military engineer and MP
Ronald Ross	6 June 1901	13 May 1857 – 16 September 1932
Janet Rossant	11 May 2000	
Matthew Jonathan Rosseinsky	16 May 2008	
Joseph Rotblat	9 March 1995	4 November 1908 – 31 August 2005, founder of Pugwash conference, Nobel Prize for Peace (1995)
Klaus Friedrich Roth	24 March 1960	
Martin Roth	14 March 1996	6 November 1917 – 26 September 2006
Leonard Rotherham	21 March 1963	31 August 1913 – 23 March 2001
Miriam Louisa Rothschild	21 March 1985	5 August 1908 – 20 January 2005
Lionel Walter Rothschild, 2nd Baron Rothschild	23 November 1911	9 February 1868 – 27 August 1937
Nathaniel Mayer Victor Rothschild, 3rd Baron Rothschild	19 March 1953	31 October 1910 – 19 March 1990
Nancy Jane Rothwell	27 May 2004	
Francis John Worsley Roughton	7 May 1936	6 June 1899 – 29 April 1972
George Leith Roupell	12 December 1839	18 September 1797 – 29 September 1854
Edward John Routh	6 June 1872	20 January 1831 – 7 June 1907
Sheila Rowan	9 May 2018	
Frederick Maurice Rowe	22 March 1945	12 February 1891 – 8 December 1946
Henry Rowe	12 April 1739	– 1769
John Martin Rowell	16 March 1989	
Ronald Rowe	2 May 2013	Civil Engineer
Arthur John Rowledge	20 March 1941	30 July 1876 – 12 December 1957
George Rowley	14 November 1811	4 April 1782 – 5 October 1836
John Rowley	9 February 1809	c. 1768 – 1 December 1824
John Shipley Rowlinson	19 March 1970	chemist
Lionel Edward Aston Rowson	15 March 1973	28 May 1914 – 26 July 1989
Charles Le Roy	31 May 1770	? 12 February 1726 – ? 12 December 1779
Charles Smart Roy	12 June 1884	27 January 1854 – 4 October 1897
Jean-Baptiste Le Roy	10 June 1773	15 August 1720 – ? 20 January 1800
William Roy	26 March 1767	4 May 1726 – 1 July 1790
Adrianus van Royen	27 June 1728	11 November 1704 – 28 February 1779
David van Royen	6 December 1759	? 1727–1799
John Forbes Royle	6 April 1837	? 1798 – 2 January 1858
George West Royston-Pigott	12 June 1873	? 1 May 1817 – 14 September 1889 Physician
David C. Rubinsztein	5 May 2017	
Arthur William Rucker	12 June 1884	23 October 1848 – 1 November 1915
Alan Walter Rudge	12 March 1992	
Edward Rudge	31 January 1805	27 June 1763 – 3 September 1846 Botanist
Edward Rudge	3 November 1726	22 October 1703 – 6 June 1763 MP
Edward John Rudge	18 February 1847	30 May 1792 – 29 January 1861 Barrister
James Rudge	17 November 1814	c. 1785–1852
Warren de la Rue	6 June 1850	15 January 1815 – ? 19 April 1889
Philip Charles Ruffles	14 May 1998	
Siegfried Ruhemann	7 May 1914	4 January 1859–1942
Henry Wyldbore Rumsey	4 June 1874	3 July 1809 – 23 October 1876 Physician
Stanley Keith Runcorn	18 March 1965	19 November 1922 – ? 6 December 1995
Prince Rupert	22 March 1665	17 December 1619 – 29 November 1682 Royal
George Stanley Rushbrooke	18 March 1982	19 January 1915 – 14 December 1995
William Albert Hugh Rushton	18 March 1948	8 December 1901 – 21 June 1980
Matthew Rushworth	16 April 2019	
Alexander Russell	15 May 1924	15 July 1861 – 14 January 1943 Elec. engineer, College principal
Alexander Russell	6 May 1756	1715 – 28 November 1768 Naturalist
Archibald Edward Russell	19 March 1970	30 May 1904 – 29 May 1995 Aerospace Engineer
Bertrand Arthur William Russell, 3rd Earl Russell	7 May 1908	19 May 1872 – 2 February 1970
Edward John Russell	3 May 1917	31 October 1872 – 12 July 1965
Frederick Stratten Russell	17 March 1938	3 November 1897 – 5 June 1984
Francis Russell	15 March 1770	– 1795 Solicitor, India Board
Henry Chamberlaine Russell	4 June 1886	18 March 1836 – 22 February 1907
Herbrand Arthur Russell, 11th Duke of Bedford	5 November 1908	20 February 1858 – 27 August 1940 Statute
Ian John Russell	16 March 1989	
Jesse Watts Russell	7 June 1821	6 May 1786 – 26 March 1875
John Scott Russell	7 June 1849	8 May 1808 – 8 June 1882
John Russell, 1st Earl Russell	6 May 1847	18 August 1792 – 28 May 1878
John Russell, 4th Duke of Bedford	11 March 1742	30 September 1710 – 15 January 1771
Michael Russell	25 March 1742	fl 1742–1767
Patrick Russell	27 November 1777	7 February 1727 – 2 July 1805
Philip St John Russell	26 May 2005	physicist
Richard Russell	13 February 1752	26 November 1687 – 19 December 1759
Robert Graham Goodwin Russell	16 May 2008	
William Russell	5 April 1832	29 May 1773 – 26 September 1839 Physician
William Russell	9 January 1777	– 1787 Levant Company Secretary
William Henry Leighton Russell	7 June 1866	26 August 1823 – 28 December 1891 Mathematician
William James Russell	6 June 1872	20 May 1830 – 12 November 1909 Chemist
Bill Rutherford	30 April 2014	Biochemist, Imperial College London
Ernest Rutherford, Baron Rutherford of Nelson	11 June 1903	30 August 1871 – 19 October 1937
Thomas Rutherford	27 January 1743	3 October 1712 – 5 October 1771
William Rutherford	1 June 1876	20 April 1839 – 21 February 1899
Michael Llewellyn Rutter	19 March 1987	
William Rutty	30 June 1720	1687 – ? 10 June 1730
Melchior De Ruusscher	26 February 1730	fl 1730–1753
Friedrich Ruysch	9 June 1715	23 March 1638 – 22 February 1731
Edward Ryan	2 February 1860	28 August 1793 – 22 August 1875
John Ryan	19 April 1798	– 1808
Paul Rycaut	12 December 1666	? 1628 – 16 November 1700 diplomat
John Walter Ryde	18 March 1948	15 April 1898 – 15 May 1961
Dudley Ryder, 2nd Earl of Harrowby	24 November 1853	? 19 May 1798 – 19 November 1882
Martin Ryle	20 March 1952	27 September 1918 – 14 October 1984
Philip Ryley	15 July 1696	– 25 January 1733
Thomas Ryves	20 November 1760	– 24 July 1788

== Foreign members ==
=== P ===
Name	Election date	Notes
Svante Pääbo	29 April 2016	20 April 1955
George Emil Palade	28 June 1984	
Michele Parrinello	27 May 2004	
Louis Pasteur	29 April 1869	27 December 1822 – 28 September 1895
Wolfgang Ernst Pauli	23 April 1953	25 April 1900 – ? 15 December 1958, Austrian-born U.S. Swedish physicist, Nobel Prize (1945)
Linus Carl Pauling	27 May 1948	29 February 1901 – 19 August 1994
Ivan Petrovich Pavlov	6 June 1907	28 September 1849 – 27 February 1936
Benjamin Peirce	25 November 1852	4 April 1809 – 6 October 1880
Jean Baptiste Perrin	28 February 1918	30 September 1870 – 17 April 1942
Hans Pettersson	26 April 1956	26 August 1888 – 25 January 1966
Richard Friedrich Johannes Pfeiffer	21 June 1928	27 March 1858 – 15 September 1947
Eduard Friedrich Wilhelm Pfluger	31 May 1888	? 7 June 1828 – ? 17 March 1910
Charles Émile Picard	25 March 1909	24 July 1856 – ? 12 December 1941
Edward Charles Pickering	6 June 1907	20 July 1846 – 3 February 1919
Alexander Pines	9 May 2002	chemist, magnetic resonance imaging, nuclear magnetic resonance
Giovanni Antonio Amedeo Plana	15 March 1827	? 8 November 1781 – 20 January 1864
Max Karl Ernst Ludwig Planck	29 April 1926	23 April 1858 – 4 October 1947
Joseph Antoine Ferdinand Plateau	24 November 1870	14 October 1801 – 15 September 1883
Julius Plücker	14 June 1855	16 July 1801 – 22 May 1868
Jules Henri Poincaré	26 April 1894	29 April 1854 – 17 July 1912
Louis Poinsot	25 November 1858	3 January 1777 – 5 December 1859
Jean Victor Poncelet	5 May 1842	1 July 1788 – 22 December 1867
Philippe Gustave Doulcet de Pontecoulant	6 June 1833	1795 – 21 July 1874
Vincent Poor	30 April 2014	
Albert Marcel Germain René Portevin	1 May 1952	1 November 1880 – 12 April 1962
Tullio Pozzan	9 May 2018	
Ludwig Prandtl	21 June 1928	5 February 1875 – 15 August 1953 Foreign Member
Frank Press	27 June 1985	U.S. geophysicist, President of United States National Academy of Sciences (1981–1993)
Pierre Prevost	17 April 1806	3 March 1751 – 8 April 1839
Gaspard Clair François Marie Riche de Prony	12 March 1818	? 11 July 1755 – 29 July 1839
Stanley Ben Prusiner	15 May 1997	U.S. scientist, Nobel Prize for Medicine (1997)
Edward Mills Purcell	29 June 1989	30 August 1912 – 7 March 1997
Johannes Evangelista Purkyne	21 November 1850	17 December 1787 – 28 July 1869

=== Q ===
Name	Election date	Notes
Calvin Forrest Quate	9 March 1995	
Lambert Adolphe Jacques Quetelet	30 May 1839	22 February 1796 – 17 February 1874
Georg Hermann Quincke	3 April 1879	19 November 1834 – 13 January 1924

=== R ===
Name	Election date	Notes
Michael Oser Rabin	17 May 2007	
Pasko Rakic	29 April 2016	
Santiago Ramon y Cajal	25 March 1909	1 May 1852 – 17 October 1934
Rino Rappuoli	29 April 2016	
Martin Heinrich Rathke	14 June 1855	25 August 1793 – ? 3 September 1860
Peter Raven	9 May 2002	
Akkihebbal Ravishankara	16 April 2019	
Henri Victor Regnault	25 November 1852	21 July 1810 – 19 January 1878
Tadeus Reichstein	1 May 1952	20 July 1897 – 1 August 1996 Polish-born Switzerland chemist, Nobel Prize for Medicine (1950)
Otto Renner	28 April 1955	25 April 1883 – 8 July 1960
Magnus Gustaf Retzius	6 June 1907	17 October 1842 – 21 July 1919
James Robert Rice	14 March 1996	
Alfred Newton Richards	18 June 1942	22 March 1876 – 24 March 1966
Theodore William Richards	26 June 1919	31 January 1868 – 2 April 1928
Ferdinand von Richthofen	27 November 1902	5 May 1833 – 6 October 1905
Georg Friedrich Bernhard Riemann	14 June 1866	17 September 1826 – 20 July 1866
Augusto Righi	6 June 1907	27 August 1850 – 8 June 1920
Robert Ritchie	5 May 2017	
Carl Ritter	30 March 1848	7 August 1779 – 28 September 1859
Auguste Arthur de la Rive	23 April 1846	9 October 1801 – 27 November 1873
Alfred Sherwood Romer	24 April 1969	28 December 1894 – 5 November 1973
Gustav Rose	14 June 1866	18 March 1798 – 15 July 1873
Heinrich Rose	5 May 1842	6 August 1795 – 27 January 1864
Otto August Rosenberger	4 June 1835	10 August 1800 – 23 January 1890
Michael G. Rossmann	14 March 1996	
James Rothman	16 April 2019	3 November 1950 –
Francis Peyton Rous	23 May 1940	6 October 1879 – 16 February 1970
Pierre Paul Emile Roux	26 June 1913	17 December 1853 – 3 November 1933
Frank Sherwood Rowland	27 May 2004	
Henry Augustus Rowland	5 December 1889	27 November 1848 – 16 April 1901
Carlo Rubbia	28 June 1984	
Gerald Mayer Rubin	17 May 2007	
Karl Ludwig Christian Rumker	14 June 1855	28 May 1788 – 21 December 1862
Henry Norris Russell	17 June 1937	26 October 1877 – 18 February 1957
Leopold Ružička	18 June 1942	13 September 1887 – 26 September 1976
Janne Robert Rydberg	28 June 1919	8 November 1854 – 19 December 1919
