= List of fellows of the Royal Society elected in 2018 =

This article lists fellows of the Royal Society who were elected on 9 May 2018.

== Fellows of the Royal Society (FRS) ==
1. Jim Al-Khalili
2. Polly Arnold
3. Jillian Banfield
4. Margaret Brimble
5. Neil Brockdorff
6. Frank Caruso
7. Vincenzo Cerundolo
8. Kevin Costello
9. Robert H. Crabtree
10. Alexander Dawid
11. Peter Dayan
12. Richard Dixon
13. Gregory Edgecombe
14. Wenfei Fan
15. Roger Goody
16. Robin Grimes
17. Gregory Hannon
18. Demis Hassabis
19. Judy Hirst
20. Graeme Jameson
21. Harren Jhoti
22. Sophien Kamoun
23. Andrew King
24. Dimitri Kullmann
25. Dominic Kwiatkowski
26. Richard Marais
27. Cathie Martin
28. Elon Musk
29. Peter O'Hearn
30. Vassilis Pachnis
31. Tracy Palmer
32. Colin Prentice
33. Lalita Ramakrishnan
34. Nancy Reid
35. Graham Richards
36. David Richardson
37. Sheila Rowan
38. Ingrid Scheffer
39. Michelle Simmons
40. John Smol
41. Timothy Softley
42. John Speakman
43. Graeme Stephens
44. Angela Strank
45. Charles Swanton
46. Peter Visscher
47. Guy Wilkinson
48. Geordie Williamson
49. Daniel Wise
50. Nikolay Zheludev

== Honorary fellows ==
1. David Willetts (Baron Willetts)

== Foreign members of the Royal Society (ForMemRS) ==
1. Carolyn Bertozzi
2. Martin Chalfie
3. Sebsebe Demissew
4. Jeffrey Friedman
5. Fabiola Gianotti
6. Albrecht Hofmann
7. Butler Lampson
8. Tullio Pozzan
9. Joachim Sauer
10. Adi Shamir
