= Paman =

Paman may refer to:

- Paman languages, an Australian language family
- Paman, Kanpur Dehat, village in Uttar Pradesh, India
- Paman, Sultanpur Lodhi, village in Punjab, India
- Perman (manga), also known as Pāman

== People with the surname ==
- Clement Paman (died 1664), English poet and clergyman
- Henry Paman, (1626–1695), English physician
- Roger Paman (c.1700-1748), English mathematician
