= Heidi Johansen-Berg =

British neuroscientist

- Born: 1974 (age 51–52); Liverpool
- Education: DPhil, Oxford University
- Alma mater: Oxford University
- Spouse: Matthew Rushworth
- Awards: OHBM Young Investigator Award
- Scientific career
- Fields: Cognitive neuroscience
- Institutions: Wellcome Centre for Integrative Neuroimaging, Oxford University
- Thesis: Reorganisation and modulation of the human sensorimotor system: implications for recovery of motor function after stroke (2001)
- Doctoral advisor: Paul Matthews
- Website: www.ndcn.ox.ac.uk/team/heidi-johansen-berg

Heidi Johansen-Berg FRS is a Professor of Cognitive Neuroscience and Director of the Wellcome Centre for Integrative Neuroimaging at the University of Oxford. She studies brain plasticity in the context of stroke rehabilitation and aging.

== Education and training ==
Johansen-Berg went to Waseley Hills High School in Rubery, Birmingham. She later received an undergraduate degree in experimental psychology and philosophy from St Edmund Hall at the University of Oxford, where she is now a fellow. She then stayed at Oxford to complete a 4-year DPhil in Neuroscience funded by the Wellcome Trust.

== Personal life ==
Heidi Johansen-Berg was born in Liverpool UK in 1974 from parents John and Joan Johansen-Berg. She has 2 brothers - Mark and Jake Johansen-Berg, and is married to Matthew Rushworth with whom they have two daughters.

== Achievements and awards ==
Johansen-Berg was the Chair of Organization for Human Brain Mapping in 2010–2011. In 2016 Johansen-Berg received a Wellcome Trust Principal Research Fellowship to support her work on neuroplasticity. She was elected a Fellow of the Academy of Medical Sciences in 2021 and a Fellow of the Royal Society in 2024.

== Research ==
Johansen-Berg has contributed to understanding of how stroke impacts the human brain and what rehabilitation strategies can help stroke patients. She published one of the first longitudinal fMRI stroke rehabilitation studies, showing that successful outcomes are associated with increased recruitment of specific motor areas. She also made early contributions to methods for tracing white matter pathways in the brain based on diffusion MRI, in particular developing the concept of a 'connectivity fingerprint' to parcellate neighbouring brain areas based upon their connections to other brain regions. She has been influential in the implementation of these methods in the FMRIB Software Library (FSL). Her current research focuses on white matter plasticity. Her group provided the first demonstration of white matter plasticity in the human brain; more recently, she has investigated the microstructural basis of this plasticity in rodent models.
