= Ben Phillips =

Ben Phillips may refer to:

- Ben Phillips (cricketer) (born 1974), English cricketer
- Ben Phillips (YouTuber) (born 1992 or 1993), Welsh YouTuber
- Benny Phillips (born 1960), English football player and manager
- Ben Phillips, guitarist for American rock band The Pretty Reckless
- Ben Phillips, Australian writer of Diary of an Uber Driver blog and e-book
- Benjamin Phillips (surgeon) (1805–1861), Welsh surgeon
- Benjamin F. Phillips, American politician
