= Henry Partridge =

Henry Partridge may refer to:

- Henry Partridge (barrister) (died 1803) FRS, see List of fellows of the Royal Society P, Q, R
- Henry Partridge (MP) for Heytesbury (UK Parliament constituency)
