= Richard Penn =

Richard Penn may refer to:

- Richard Penn Sr. (1706–1771), younger son of William Penn and joint proprietor of Pennsylvania
- Richard Penn (governor) (c. 1735–1811), his son, Lieutenant Governor of Pennsylvania, 1771–1773, and British Member of Parliament
- Richard Penn (FRS) (1784–1863), Member of Parliament and Fellow of the Royal Society

== See also ==
- Dick Penn, English cricketer
