= Saga of Tanya the Evil: The Movie =

2019 Japanese animated fantasy action film

- Directed by: Yutaka Uemura
- Screenplay by: Kenta Ihara
- Based on: The Saga of Tanya the Evil by Carlo Zen
- Music by: Shūji Katayama
- Production company: NUT
- Distributed by: Kadokawa Daiei Studio
- Release date: February 8, 2019
- Running time: 115 minutes
- Country: Japan
- Language: Japanese
- Box office: ¥400 million (Japan)

Saga of Tanya the Evil: The Movie (劇場版 幼女戦記, Gekijōban Yōjo Senki) is a 2019 Japanese animated fantasy action film based on The Saga of Tanya the Evil light novel series, intended as a sequel to the anime series that aired in 2017. Announced in the start of 2018, it was released in Japan on February 8, 2019. The cast and staff reprised their roles from the anime TV series.

== Plot ==
Years after the war, Adelheid von Schugel, now a priest, explains to a reporter that the Empire was at war because all the other nations feared its power.

The 203rd Aerial Mage Battalion are on a sortie in Africa against Free Republic forces and destroy their headquarters. Tanya announces that the 203rd would return to the Empire for R&R, but upon their return, Rerugen orders them into an immediate reconnaissance mission on the Empire's eastern border with the Russy Federation. At the border, while the 203rd observe Federation forces stockpiling heavy artillery materiel they receive a message advising that the Federation has declared war on the Empire. Tanya and the 203rd proceeds to destroy the entire enemy encampment. She proposes a direct attack on the Moscow, the capital city of the Federation, asserting that its AA defence is poor. HQ authorizes the attack, and the 203rd are unopposed in the air because the Federation has sent its mages to internment camps.

Meanwhile, Warrant Officer Mary Sioux, has enlisted in the US Army to avenge her father, Anton Sioux. She arrives in Moscow with other multinational military volunteers of the 42nd Flying Division for recruit training under Lieutenant Colonel William Drake but the 42nd suffers casualties as a result of Tanya's attack. The 203rd use the successful operation as an opportunity to record propaganda footage by singing the Imperial national anthem over Moscow. Loria, a member of the Federation's cabinet, witnesses Tanya singing and becomes infatuated with her.

Mary becomes enraged and takes off alone to engage the 203rd, disobeying Drake's orders. The remaining members of the 42nd are also forced to engage in battle where they suffer losses because of their inexperience. Mary engages Tanya in a fierce duel, but is defeated and is found later lying gravely wounded in a crater begging God for the power to kill Tanya.

The 203rd and other Imperial soldiers celebrate their successes at Imperial East Border Temporary Camp 21, drinking the night away. The 203rd receives a request to assist the 3rd and 22nd Divisions, who have been encircled at Tiegenhoff. Tanya agrees to help, because taking control of Tiegenhoff would give the Empire control of the major railway hub leading into the Federation. The 203rd succeeds in defending Tiegenhoff. Back in Moscow, Loria suspects Tanya is at Tiegenhoff and advocates the use of a massed assault to capture the city.

The Federation begins a human wave attack on Tiegenhoff, causing massive casualties on both sides. The fight continues into the next day, with the arrival of the 42nd and a bomber flight escorted by fighters. Mary sees Tanya and in a rage, disobeys Drake's orders by attacking Tanya alone, exhibiting her abnormally massive magical power. While dueling, Tanya suspects that Mary has been influenced by Being X. Mary incapacitates Tanya and violently assaults her on the ground. Tanya manages to grievously wound Mary but she is rescued by Drake. With the Federation assault halted, Drake orders the 42nd to retreat.

Tanya convinces Strategic Headquarters to let her transfer to the rear for two months to do research on combined arms battle tactics. She visits a church and expresses elation at having been removed from the frontline while insulting Being X. To her horror, two months later Zettour informs Tanya that she has been given control of the 8th Kampfgruppe 'Salamander', a combined arms unit, in addition to her own 203rd in order, to investigate the efficacy of her own research.

== Cast ==
Character	Japanese voice	English voice
Tanya von Degurechaff	Aoi Yūki	Monica Rial
Victoriya Ivanovna Serebryakov	Saori Hayami	Jeannie Tirado
Matheus Johann Weiss	Daiki Hamano	Daman Mills
Rhiner Neumann	Daichi Hayashi	Ben Phillips
Wilibald Koenig	Jun Kasama	Christopher Wehkamp
Vooren Grantz	Yūsuke Kobayashi	Jeff Johnson
Mary Sioux	Haruka Tomatsu	Tia Ballard
Hans von Zettour	Hōchū Ōtsuka	Jason Douglas
Kurt von Rudersdorf	Tesshō Genda	Greg Dulcie
Erich von Rerugen	Shin-ichiro Miki	J. Michael Tatum
Isaac Dustin Drake	Binbin Takaoka	David Matranga
Pierre Michel de Lugo	Takaya Hashi	Ian Sinclair
Severin Bientot	Ryokan Koyanagi	Kent Williams
Adelheid von Schugel	Nobuo Tobita	Charles C. Campbell

== Reception ==
The film was both a critical and commercial success, earning 100 million yen in its first five days and 400 million yen in total.

Overall, the film received generally positive reviews. Dave Trumbore of Collider favourably reviewed the film, giving it an 'A−'. Trumbore wrote, "The war acts as a backdrop for these two incredibly powerful mages who wind up on a destined collision course with each other, and it’s a fight you won’t want to miss." Jordan Ramée of GameSpot rated it 7/10, and praised the introduction of Mary Sioux as a character, writing, "Mary [Sioux] injects a welcome level of tension into the story, and is a compelling villain for Tanya to fight," but also notes that "Other than the final fight, battles lack the intensity of an aerial dogfight".
