= Thomas Pockley =

English physician and natural historian

- Born: ca. 1627
- Died: 1661; Dunkirk, France
- Education: Trinity College, Cambridge
- Occupation: Physician

Thomas Pockley (ca. 1627-1661) was a natural historian and physician, and was one of the original fellows of the Royal Society.

== Life ==
Pockley was born in Yorkshire ca. 1627, and was admitted to Trinity College, Cambridge in 1645. He was elected a scholar in 1649, graduated with the B.A. degree in 1649-50 and was elected a fellow of Trinity College in 1650. In 1651, Pockley was given three years’ leave to travel with expenses by the college.

At Trinity College, Pockley worked with natural historians John Ray and John Nidd. One botanical book formerly owned by Pockley is still held in the Wren Library of Trinity College, and Pockley's brass calculating ruler is held in the University of Cambridge’s Whipple Museum. Pockley is also listed on a botanical manuscript from 1659 by physician John Mapletoft, along with Ray, Nidd and natural historian Francis Willughby.

In 1654, physician Dr Henry Power wrote to Pockley from Halifax recalling his joy at having studied physical, mathematical and anatomical topics at Cambridge.

Pockley was proposed for fellowship of the Philosophical Society (later Royal Society) on 28 August 1661, and elected in September 1661. Pockley died later that year in Dunkirk, France, where he was working as a physician for the British army. In November 1661, John Ray wrote to Peter Courthope, owner of Danny House in Sussex, informing him of the news of the death of their friend.
