= IEEE Photonics Award =

Science award

- Awarded for: Outstanding achievements in photonics
- Presented by: Institute of Electrical and Electronics Engineers
- First award: 2002
- Website: IEEE Photonics Award

The IEEE Photonics Award is a Technical Field Award established by the IEEE Board of Directors in 2002. This award is presented for outstanding achievements in photonics, including work relating to: light-generation, transmission, deflection, amplification and detection and the optical/electro-optical componentry and instrumentation used to accomplish these functions. Also included are storage technologies utilizing photonics to read or write data and optical display technologies. It also extends from energy generation/propagation, communications, information processing, storage and display, biomedical and medical uses of light and measurement applications.

This award may be presented to an individual or a team of up to three people.

The IEEE Photonics Award consists of a bronze medal, a certificate, and an honorarium. The award is administered by the IEEE Technical Field Awards Council, with recipients selected by a committee based on technical merit, impact, and innovation in the field of photonics.

== Recipients ==
2027: Martin David Dawson

For contributions to microstructured and wide-bandgap semiconductor optoelectronics and for leadership in technological innovation

2026: Chennupati Jagadish

For contributions to compound semiconductor nanotechnology for optoelectronic devices and impact on the Photonics community

2025: David Richardson

For contributions to fiber lasers, fiber telecommunications, and hollow-core optical fibers

2024: Kim Roberts

For leadership in the introduction and development of digital coherent signal processing for optical fiber transmission systems.

2023: Roel Baets

For pioneering research in integrated photonics, including silicon, silicon-nitride, III-V devices, and their heterogeneous integration.

2022: Rodney S. Tucker

For contributions to photonic device modelling and bridging the gap between device and system-level performance, including energy consumption.

2021: Jack Jewell

For seminal and sustained contributions to the development and commercialization of vertical-cavity surface-emitting lasers (VCSEL).

2020: Christopher Richard Doerr

For sustained pioneering research, development, and commercialization of photonic integrated circuits and devices for telecommunications.

2019: Michal Lipson

For pioneering contributions to silicon photonics.

2018: Ursula Keller

For seminal contributions to ultrafast laser technology enabling important industrial applications and novel scientific breakthroughs.

2017: John E. Bowers

For pioneering research in silicon photonics, including hybrid silicon lasers, photonic integrated circuits, and ultra-lowloss waveguides.

2016: Mark E. Thompson

For scientific and technical leadership in the conception, demonstration, and development of phosphorescent materials in organic light-emitting diode (OLED) displays.

2015: Philip St. John Russell

For pioneering contributions to the conception and realization of photonic crystal fibers.

2014: James G. Fujimoto

For pioneering the development and commercialization of optical coherence tomography for medical diagnostics.

2013: Peter F. Moulton

For the discovery of the Ti:Sapphire laser and the development of many novel solidstate laser systems and applications.

2012: Eli Yablonovitch

For pioneering contributions to photonic crystals, the photonic bandgap and photonic bandgap engineering.

2011: Amnon Yariv

For fundamental contributions to photonics science, engineering and education that have broadly impacted quantum electronics and lightwave communications.

2010: Ivan P. Kaminow

For seminal contributions to electro-optic modulation, integrated optics, and semiconductor lasers, and leadership in optical telecommunications.

2009: Robert L. Byer

For seminal contributions to nonlinear optics and solid-state lasers for commercial applications from precision measurement to manufacturing.

2008: Joe C. Campbell

For seminal and sustained contributions to the development of high-speed, low-noise long wavelength avalanche photodiodes.

2007: David N. Payne

For pioneering contributions to the development and commercialization of optical fiber-based technologies for communications, sensors, and high power applications.

2006: Frederick J. Leonberger

For technical leadership, commercialization and practical deployment of photonic component technologies for optical communications.

2005: Rod C. Alferness

For seminal contributions to enabling photonics technologies and for visionary leadership in their application to networks and systems.

2004: Tingye Li

For leadership, vision and pioneering contributions in the fields of optical fiber communications and laser science.
