= Rod C. Alferness =

American physicist

- Citizenship: American
- Education: University of Michigan, Hamline University
- Awards: IEEE Photonics Award (2005)
- Scientific career
- Fields: Physics
- Doctoral advisor: Emmett Leith

Rod C. Alferness was president of The Optical Society in 2008.

Alferness is the dean of the college of engineering at the University of California, Santa Barbara. Before that, Alferness was chief scientist, Bell Laboratories, Alcatel-Lucent and the Bell Laboratories research senior vice president. His previous position was the Bell Laboratories optical networking research senior vice president. Alferness also was the chief technical officer and advanced technology and architecture vice-president of the Optical Networking Group, Lucent Technologies. Prior to that role, he was head of the Photonics Networks Research Department of Lucent Bell Laboratories, Holmdel, New Jersey.

Alferness joined Bell Labs in 1976 after receiving a B.A. in physics from Hamline University and a Ph.D. in physics from the University of Michigan where his thesis research, under the supervision of Professor Emmett Leith, concerned optical propagation in volume holograms. His early research at Bell Labs included the demonstration of novel waveguide electro-optic devices and circuits - including switch/modulators, polarization controllers, tunable filters - and their applications in high capacity lightwave transmission and switching systems. This research led to the early development of titanium diffused lithium niobate waveguide modulators that are now deployed as the high-speed signal-encoding engine in fiber optic transmission systems around the world. Dr. Alferness has also made contributions in photonic integrated circuits in InP, including widely tunable lasers, as well as in photonic switching systems and reconfigurable WDM (wavelength-division-multiplexed) optical networks. In the mid-1990s, he was an originator and the Bell Labs Program Manager for the DARPA funded MONET project which demonstrated the feasibility of wavelength routed optical networks that are now being implemented for both backbone and metro networks. Dr. Alferness has authored over 100 papers, holds 35 patents and has authored five book chapters.

Alferness is a Fellow of The Optical Society and the IEEE Lasers and Electro-Optics Society (LEOS). Alferness received the 2005 IEEE Photonics Award. From Optica, he has received the 2018 Frederic Ives Medal/Jarus W. Quinn Prize and the Robert H. Hopkins Leadership Award. He has served as an elected member of the LEOS AdCom and was the President of IEEE LEOS in 1997. He was general co-chair of the 1994 Optical Fiber Communications Conference (OFC’94). Alferness has served as associate editor for Optics Letters and for Photonics Technology Letters. He has served on many IEEE and OSA committees, including fellows and awards committees. Alferness also currently serves on the European Conference on Optical Communication (ECOC) executive management committee. He served as the editor-in-chief of the IEEE and OSA-sponsored Journal of Lightwave Technology from 1995 to 2000. He served as an elected member of The Optical Society's board of directors from 2001 to 2003.

Alferness was elected as a member into the National Academy of Engineering in 2003 for contributions to the development of electro-optic devices and circuits for light-wave transmission and switching systems.

== See also ==
- Optical Society of America#Past Presidents of the OSA
