= Reginald Rainey =

Reginald Charles Rainey (18 June 1913 – 18 January 1990) was a British entomologist.
