= Max Perutz =

Austrian-born British molecular biologist (1914–2002)

Max Perutz OM CH CBE FRS
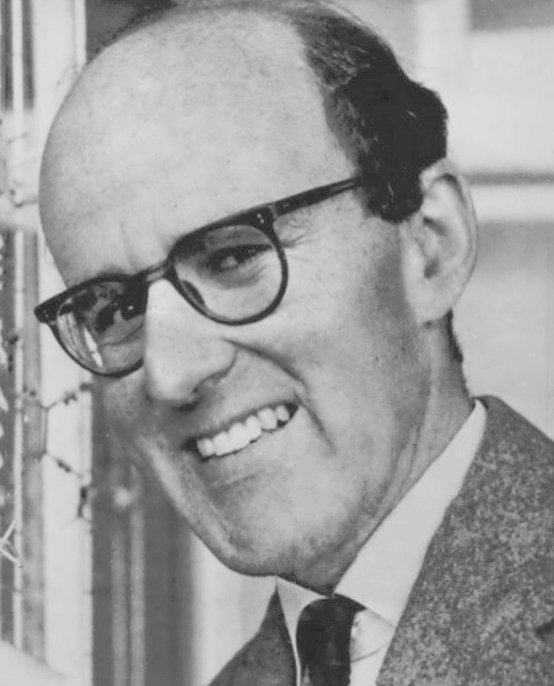
- Perutz in 1962
- Born: Max Ferdinand Perutz; 19 May 1914; Vienna, Austria-Hungary
- Died: 6 February 2002 (aged 87); Cambridge, England
- Education: University of Vienna (BSc); University of Cambridge (PhD)
- Known for: Three-dimensional structure of haemoglobin
- Spouse: Gisela Clara Peiser (m. 1942; 2 children)
- Awards: Nobel Prize for Chemistry (1962); Wilhelm Exner Medal (1967); Sir Hans Krebs Medal (1968); Royal Medal (1971); Copley Medal (1979)
- Scientific career
- Fields: Molecular biology Crystallography
- Workplaces: University of Cambridge; Laboratory of Molecular Biology
- Doctoral advisor: John Desmond Bernal
- Doctoral students: Francis Crick; John Keith Moffat

Max Ferdinand Perutz (19 May 1914 – 6 February 2002) was an Austrian-born British molecular biologist, who shared the 1962 Nobel Prize for Chemistry with John Kendrew, for their studies of the structures of haemoglobin and myoglobin. He went on to win the Royal Medal of the Royal Society in 1971 and the Copley Medal in 1979. At Cambridge he founded and chaired (1962–79) The MRC Laboratory of Molecular Biology (LMB), fourteen of whose scientists have won Nobel Prizes.

== Early life and education ==
Perutz was born in Vienna, the son of Adele "Dely" (Goldschmidt) and Hugo Perutz, a textile manufacturer. His parents were Jewish by ancestry, but had baptised Perutz in the Catholic religion. Although Perutz rejected religion and was an atheist in his later years, he was against offending others for their religious beliefs.

His parents hoped that he would become a lawyer, but he became interested in chemistry while at school. Overcoming his parents' objections he enrolled as a chemistry undergraduate at the University of Vienna and completed his degree in 1936. Made aware by lecturer Fritz von Wessely of the advances being undertaken at the University of Cambridge into biochemistry by a team led by Gowland Hopkins, he asked Professor Mark, who was soon to visit Cambridge, to make inquiries of Hopkins about whether there would be a place for him. Mark forgot, but had visited J.D. Bernal, who was looking for a research student to assist him with studies into X-ray crystallography. Perutz was dismayed as he knew nothing about the subject. Mark countered by saying that he would soon learn. Bernal accepted him as a research student in his crystallography research group at the Cavendish Laboratory. His father had deposited £500 with his London agent to support him. He learnt quickly. Bernal encouraged him to use the X-ray diffraction method to study the structure of proteins. As protein crystals were difficult to obtain, he used horse haemoglobin crystals, and began his doctoral thesis on its structure. Haemoglobin was a subject which was to occupy him for most of his professional career. He completed his Ph.D. under Lawrence Bragg in 1940.

He applied to Kings and St. John's colleges, and became a member of Peterhouse, on the basis that it served the best food. He was elected an Honorary Fellow of Peterhouse in 1962. He took a keen interest in the Junior Members, and was a regular and popular speaker at the Kelvin Club, the college's scientific society.

== World War II ==
When Hitler took over Austria in 1938, Perutz's parents managed to escape to Switzerland, but they had lost all of their money. As a result, Perutz lost their financial support. With his ability to ski, experience in mountaineering since childhood and his knowledge of crystals, Perutz was accepted as a member of a three-man team to study the conversion of snow into ice in Swiss glaciers in the summer of 1938. His resulting article for the Proceedings of the Royal Society made him known as an expert on glaciers.

Lawrence Bragg, who was Professor of Experimental Physics at the Cavendish, thought that Perutz's research into haemoglobin had promise and encouraged him to apply for a grant from the Rockefeller Foundation to continue his research. The application was accepted in January 1939 and with the money Perutz was able to bring his parents from Switzerland to England in March 1939.

On the outbreak of World War II, Perutz was rounded up along with other persons of German or Austrian background, and sent to Newfoundland (on orders from Winston Churchill). After being interned for several months he returned to Cambridge. Because of his pre-War research into the changes in the arrangement of the crystals in the layers of a glacier, he was asked for advice on whether if a battalion of commandos were landed in Norway, could they be hidden in shelters under glaciers. His knowledge on the subject of ice then led to him being recruited for Project Habakkuk in 1942. This was a secret project to build an ice platform in the mid-Atlantic, which could be used to refuel aircraft. To that end he investigated the recently invented mixture of ice and woodpulp known as pykrete. He carried out early experiments on pykrete in a secret location underneath Smithfield Meat Market in the City of London.

== Establishment of the Molecular Biology Unit ==
After the War he returned briefly to glaciology, demonstrating how glaciers flow.

In 1947, Perutz, with the support of Professor Bragg, was successful in obtaining support from the Medical Research Council (MRC) to undertake research into the molecular structure of biological systems. This financial support allowed him to establish the Molecular Biology Unit at the Cavendish Laboratory. Perutz's new unit attracted researchers who realised that the field of molecular biology had great promise; among them were Francis Crick in 1949 and James D. Watson in 1951.

In 1953, Perutz showed that diffracted X-rays from protein crystals could be phased by comparing the patterns from crystals of the protein with and without heavy atoms attached. In 1959 he employed this method to determine the molecular structure of the protein haemoglobin, which transports oxygen in the blood. This work resulted in his sharing with John Kendrew the 1962 Nobel Prize for Chemistry. In 2013, about 9,700 structures deposited in the Protein Data Bank were determined by X-ray crystallography, which was 92% of that year's entries.

After 1959, Perutz and his colleagues went on to determine the structure of oxy- and deoxy- haemoglobin at high resolution. As a result, in 1970, he was at last able to suggest how it works as a molecular machine: how it switches between its deoxygenated and its oxygenated states, in turn triggering the uptake of oxygen and then its release to the muscles and other organs. Further work over the next two decades refined and corroborated the proposed mechanism. In addition Perutz studied the structural changes in a number of haemoglobin diseases and how these might affect oxygen binding. He hoped that the molecule could be made to function as a drug receptor and that it would be possible to inhibit or reverse the genetic errors such as those that occur in sickle cell anaemia. A further interest was the variation of the haemoglobin molecule from species to species to suit differing habitats and patterns of behaviour. In his final years Perutz turned to the study of changes in protein structures implicated in Huntington and other neurodegenerative diseases. He demonstrated that the onset of Huntington disease is related to the number of glutamine repeats as they bind to form what he called a "polar zipper".

== DNA structure and Rosalind Franklin ==
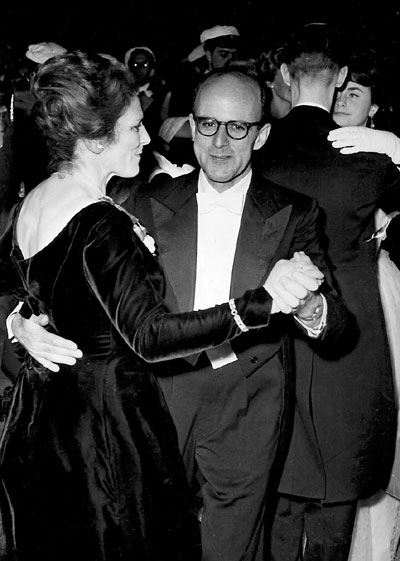
Perutz with his wife Gisela at the 1962 Nobel ball

During the early 1950s, while Watson and Crick were trying to determine the structure of deoxyribonucleic acid (DNA), they were given by Perutz an unpublished 1952 progress report for the King's College laboratory of Sir John Randall. This report contained X-ray diffraction images taken by Rosalind Franklin that proved to be crucial in coming to the double-helix structure.

Perutz did this without Franklin's knowledge or permission, and before she had a chance to publish a detailed analysis of the content of her unpublished progress report. Later this action was criticised by Randall and others, in view of the results and the honours resulting from this "gift".

In an effort to clarify this issue, Perutz later published the report, arguing that it included nothing that Franklin had not said in a talk she gave in late 1951, which Watson had attended. Perutz also added that the report was addressed to an MRC committee created to "establish contact between the different groups of people working for the Council". Randall's and Perutz's labs were both funded by the MRC.

== Authorship ==
In his later years, Perutz was a regular reviewer/essayist for The New York Review of Books on biomedical subjects. Many of these essays are reprinted in his 1998 book, I wish I had made you angry earlier.

In August 1985, The New Yorker published his account of his experiences as an internee during World War II, titled "That Was the War: Enemy Alien".

Perutz won the Lewis Thomas Prize for Writing about Science in 1997.

A collection of Perutz's correspondence was published posthumously in 2009, titled What a Time I Am Having: Selected Letters of Max Perutz.

== Philosophy and religion ==
Perutz attacked the theories of philosophers Sir Karl Popper and Thomas Kuhn and biologist Richard Dawkins in a lecture given at Cambridge on 'Living Molecules' in 1994. He criticised Popper's notion that science progresses through a process of hypothesis formation and refutation, saying that hypotheses are not necessarily the basis of scientific research and, in molecular biology at least, they are not necessarily subject to revision either. For Perutz, Kuhn's notion that science advances in paradigm shifts that are subject to social and cultural pressures is an unfair representation of modern science.

These criticisms extended to scientists who attack religion, in particular to Dawkins. Statements which offend people's religious faith were for Perutz tactless and simply damage the reputation of science, though he did not criticize scientists opposing "demonstrably false" theories such as creationism. He concluded that "even if we do not believe in God, we should try to live as though we did."

Within days of the 11 September attacks in 2001, Perutz wrote to British Prime Minister Tony Blair, appealing to him to not respond with military force: "I am alarmed by the American cries for vengeance and concerned that President Bush's retaliation will lead to the death of thousands more innocent people, driving us into a world of escalating terror and counter-terror. I do hope that you can use your restraining influence to prevent this happening."

== Honours and awards ==
Perutz was elected a Fellow of the Royal Society (FRS) in 1954. In addition to the Nobel Prize for Chemistry in 1962, which he shared with John Kendrew for their respective studies of the structures of haemoglobin and myoglobin, Max Perutz received a number of other important honours: he was appointed a Commander of the Order of the British Empire in 1963, elected to the American Academy of Arts and Sciences that same year, received the Austrian Decoration for Science and Art in 1967, was elected to the American Philosophical Society in 1968, elected to the United States National Academy of Sciences in 1970, received the Royal Medal of the Royal Society in 1971, appointed a Member of the Order of the Companions of Honour in 1975, received the Copley Medal in 1979 and became a Member of the Order of Merit in 1988.

Perutz was made a Member of the German Academy of Sciences Leopoldina in 1964, received an Honorary doctorate from the University of Vienna (1965) and received the Wilhelm Exner Medal in 1967. He was elected to EMBO Membership in 1964.

The European Crystallographic Association established the Max Perutz Prize, named in his honour.

== Publications ==
=== Lectures ===
In 1980, Perutz was invited to deliver one of the six lectures for the Royal Institution Christmas Lectures on The Chicken, the Egg and the Molecules.

=== Books ===
- 1962. Proteins and Nucleic Acids; Structure and Function. Amsterdam and London: Elsevier (eighth Weizmann Memorial Lecture - Weizmann Institute of Science) LCCN 62-19696
- 1989. Is Science Necessary? Essays on science and scientists. London. Barrie and Jenkins. ISBN 0-7126-2123-7
- 1990. Mechanisms of Cooperativity and Allosteric Regulation in Proteins. Cambridge. Cambridge University Press ISBN 0-521-38648-9
- 1992. Protein Structure: New Approaches to Disease and Therapy. New York. Freeman. ISBN 0-7167-7021-0
- 1994. I Wish I’d Made You Angry Earlier. Cold Spring Harbor, New York. Cold Spring Harbor Laboratory Press. co-published with Oxford University Press.

- 2002. I Wish I’d Made You Angry Earlier; with nine additional essays by the author for this edition Cold Spring Harbor, New York. Cold Spring Harbor Laboratory Press. ISBN 978-0-87969-674-0

"The expanded paperback edition is only available from Cold Spring Harbor Laboratory Press."

- 1997. Science is Not a Quiet Life: Unravelling the Atomic Mechanism of Haemoglobin. Singapore. World Scientific. ISBN 981-02-3057-5
- 2009. What a Time I Am Having: Selected Letters of Max Perutz edited by Vivien Perutz. Cold Spring Harbor, New York. Cold Spring Harbor Laboratory Press. ISBN 978-0-87969-864-5

=== Periodicals ===
- "M. F. Perutz". The New York Review of Books.
- "M. F. Perutz". The New Yorker.

== Personal life ==
In 1942, Perutz married Gisela Clara Mathilde Peiser (1915–2005), a medical photographer. They had two children, Vivien (b. 1944), an art historian; and Robin (b. 1949), a professor of chemistry at the University of York. Gisela was a refugee from Germany (she was a Protestant whose own father had been born Jewish).

He died on 6 February 2002 and his ashes were interred with his parents Hugo Perutz and Dely Perutz in the Parish of the Ascension Burial Ground in Cambridge. Gisela died on 17 December 2005 and her ashes were interred in the same grave.

== Sources ==
- Brown, Andrew, 2005. J. D. Bernal: The Sage of Science. Oxford University Press. ISBN 0-19-920565-5
- De Chadarevian, Soraya, 2002. Designs For Life: Molecular Biology After World War II. Cambridge Univ. Press. ISBN 0-521-57078-6
- Dickerson, Richard E., 2005. Present at the Flood: How Structural Molecular Biology Came About. Sinauer. ISBN 0-87893-168-6
- Ferry, Georgina, 2007. Max Perutz and the Secret of Life. Published in the UK by Chatto & Windus (ISBN 0-7011-7695-4), and in the US by the Cold Spring Harbor Laboratory Press.
- Finch, John; 'A Nobel Fellow on Every Floor', Medical Research Council 2008, 381 pp, ISBN 978-1-84046-940-0; this book is all about the MRC Laboratory of Molecular Biology, Cambridge.
- Hager, Thomas, 1995. Force of Nature: The Life of Linus Pauling. Simon & Schuster. ISBN 0-684-80909-5
- Hunter, Graeme, 2004. Light Is A Messenger, the life and science of William Lawrence Bragg. Oxford Univ. Press. ISBN 0-19-852921-X.
- Horace Freeland Judson, 1979. "The Eighth Day of Creation: Makers of the Revolution in Biology". Touchstone Books, ISBN 0-671-22540-5. 2nd edition: Cold Spring Harbor Laboratory Press, 1996 paperback: ISBN 0-87969-478-5.
- Krude, Torsten, ed., 2003. DNA Changing Science and Society. Cambridge Univ. Press. ISBN 0-521-82378-1. Being the Darwin Lectures for 2003, including one by Sir Aaron Klug on Rosalind Franklin's role in determining the structure of DNA.
- Maddox, Brenda, 2003. Rosalind Franklin: The Dark Lady of DNA. ISBN 0-00-655211-0.
- Medawar, Jean; Pyke, David (2012). Hitler's Gift: The True Story of the Scientists Expelled by the Nazi Regime (Paperback). New York: Arcade Publishing. ISBN 978-1-61145-709-4.
- Olby, Robert; 'Perutz, Max Ferdinand (1914–2002), Oxford Dictionary of National Biography, online edn, Oxford University Press, Jan 2008.
- Paterlini, Marta, 2006. Piccole Visioni: La Grande Storia di una Molecola. Codice Edizioni. ISBN 88-7578-052-8
- Ridley, Matt, Francis Crick: Discoverer of the Genetic Code (Eminent Lives). HarperCollins Publishers. ISBN 0-06-082333-X.
- Sayre, Anne, 1975. Rosalind Franklin and DNA. New York: W.W. Norton and Company. ISBN 0-393-32044-8.
- Watson, John D., 1980 (1968). The Double Helix: A Personal Account of the Discovery of the Structure of DNA. Atheneum. ISBN 0-689-70602-2. Gunther S. Stent edited the 1980 Norton Critical Edition (ISBN 0-393-01245-X).
- Wilkins, Maurice, 2003. The Third Man of the Double Helix: The Autobiography of Maurice Wilkins. ISBN 0-19-860665-6.

Academic offices
Preceded by Andrew Fielding Huxley	Fullerian Professor of Physiology; 1973–1979	Succeeded by David Chilton Phillips
