= Robin Perutz =

- Born: December 1949 (age 76); Cambridge, UK
- Education: University of Cambridge; Newcastle University
- Occupation: Professor of Inorganic Chemistry
- Parents: Max Perutz (father); Gisela Clara Mathilde Peiser (mother)

Robin Perutz FRS (born December 1949, in Cambridge) is a professor of Inorganic Chemistry at the University of York, where he was formerly head of department between 2000 and 2004. He is also the son of the Nobel Prize winner Max Perutz.

Perutz's research spans inorganic chemistry, photochemistry, and catalysis. In particular, his interests lie in the mechanistic details of homogeneous catalysis by transition metal complexes, and is responsible for many techniques used in the field. Perutz's research has enabled chemists to take a different approach to fundamental reactions and many industrial processes.

== Education ==
Perutz graduated from the University of Cambridge with a BA in Natural Sciences in 1971. He subsequently worked for his PhD alongside Professor Jim Turner FRS, initially in Cambridge and then at Newcastle University. His focus was on utilising photochemical metal carbonyl dissociation in low temperature matrices, producing seminal work on the interaction of Cr(CO)_{5} with ‘inert’ matrix hosts, including CH_{4} and Xe.

== Awards and distinctions ==
- Fellow of the Royal Society (2010)
- Franco-British Prize of the French Chemical Society (2009)
- Sacconi Medal of Italian Chemical Society and Sacconi Foundation (2008)
- President of Dalton Division of the Royal Society of Chemistry (2007–10)
- Nyholm Medal and Lectureship of the Royal Society of Chemistry (2005)

== Plenary and invited lectures ==
- Plenary Lecture ACS Winter Fluorine Conference, Florida (January 2005)
- Invited Lecture International Symposium on Photophysics and Photochemistry of Coordination Compounds, Hong Kong (July 2004)
- Troisième Cycle Lecturer, Bern, Basel, Neuchatel & Lausanne, Switzerland (May 2003)

== Equality and diversity ==
Perutz has been an advocate for women in science; the Chemistry Department at York became the first to win the Athena SWAN gold status, an award for good practice on women’s equality. He also supports STEM students with disabilities.
