= Robert Robertson (physician) =

British surgeon

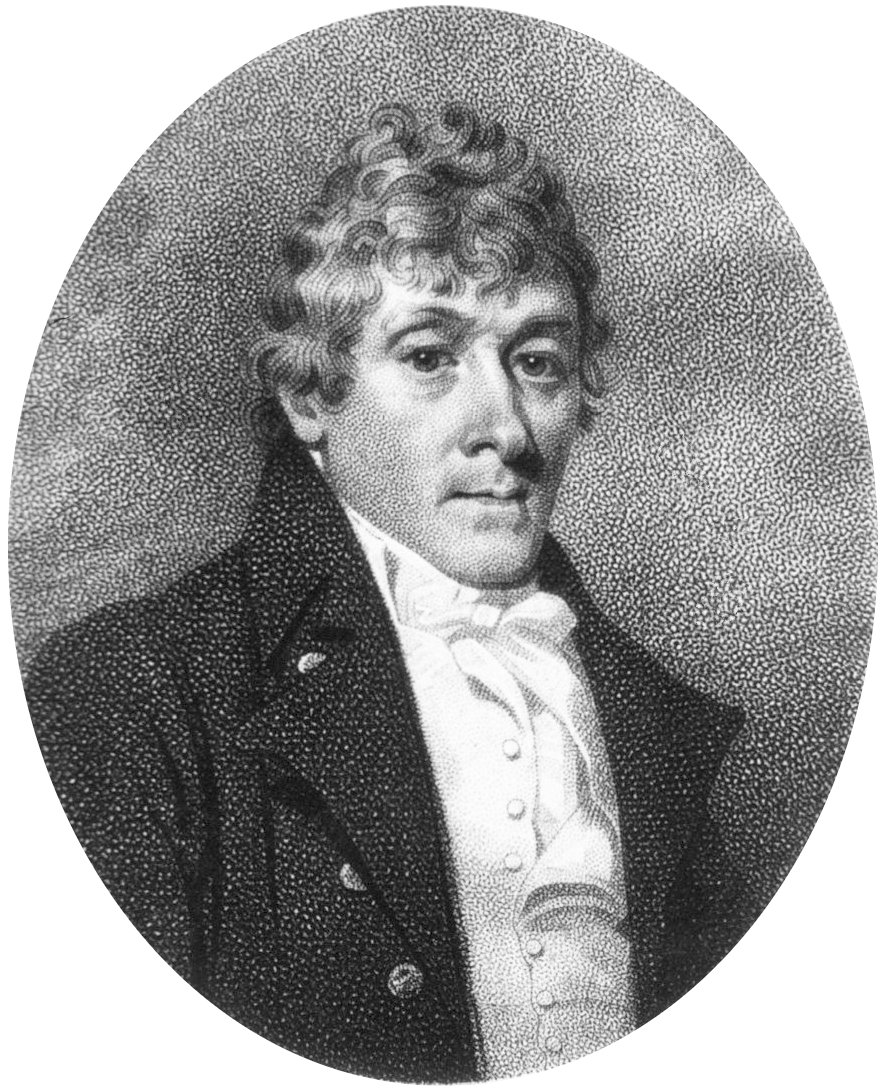
Robert Robertson

Robert Robertson (1742–1829) was a British surgeon and a Fellow of the Royal Society.

Robertson was born in Scotland and educated as a surgeon, in which capacity he started working as a naval doctor, first on whaling ships (from 1760), and then in the Royal Navy (from 1768). During his numerous expeditions, he recorded observations on fevers, scurvy and numerous other illnesses. After 23 years of service, he retired to private practice in Hampshire. He was created doctor of medicine by the University of Aberdeen on 12 February 1779 and was admitted a Licentiate of the College of Physicians on 25 June 1779. Around that time, he was appointed physician and later director to the Greenwich Hospital, where he was one of the early practitioners in the care of the elderly. He retired in 1807 and died at Greenwich. He was a fellow of the Royal and Antiquarian Societies, and the author of the following works:

- A Physical Journal kept on board H.M. Ship " Rainbow," daring three voyages to the Coast of Africa and the West Indies; with a Particular Account of the Remitting Fever which happened on that coast in 1769 in H.M. Sloop " Weasel." 4to. Lond. 1779.
- Observations on Jail, Hospital, or Ship Fever, from 4 April 1776, to 30 April 1789, made in various parts of Europe and America, and on the Intermediate Seas. London 1789.
- An Essay on Fevers; in which their theoretic genera, species, and various denominations are, from experience and observation of thirty years, reduced to their characteristic genus, febrile infection, and the cure established on philosophic induction. London 1790.
- Observations on the Diseases incident to Seamen. London 1807.
- Synopsis Morborum: a Summary View or Observation on the Principal Diseases incident to Seamen or Soldiers. London 1810.
