= Kenneth John Packer =

British scientist (1938–2021)

Kenneth John Packer FRS (18 May 1938 – 18 September 2021) was a British nuclear magnetic resonance (NMR) scientist who was amongst the pioneers of NMR application in the second half of the 20th century.

Born in Kettering, Packer studied chemistry at Imperial College London, before embarking on a PhD at the University of Cambridge, where his career in the field of NMR and its applications would begin. His NMR research was established at the School of Chemistry at the University of East Anglia (UEA), where he remained for twenty years from 1964 to 1984. He then left academia for almost a decade, working for BP Research, before returning as research chair in the chemistry department of the University of Nottingham, where he remained until retirement in 2001.

He received the Royal Society of Chemistry's Medal for Analytical Spectroscopy in 1986. He was elected Fellow of the Royal Society in 1991.
