= Richard Passingham =

British neuroscientist

Richard Passingham FRS
- Born: Richard Edward Passingham; 6 August 1943 (age 82)
- Other names: Dick Passingham
- Education: Shrewsbury School
- Alma mater: University of Oxford (MA); University of London (MSc); University of London (DPhil)
- Scientific career
- Fields: Neuroscience
- Institutions: University of Oxford; Wellcome Trust Centre for Neuroimaging, UCL
- Notable students: John Aggleton; Matthew Rushworth

Richard Edward Passingham FRS (born 16 August 1943) is a British neuroscientist. He is an international authority on the frontal lobe mechanisms for decision making and executive control. He is amongst the most highly cited neuroscientists.

== Education ==
He was educated at Shrewsbury School and Balliol College, Oxford. Passingham studied for an undergraduate degree in Psychology and Philosophy in 1966 followed in 1967 by a MSc in Abnormal Psychology at the Maudsley Hospital, London. In 1970, he undertook his examination for promotion to Doctor of Philosophy at the University of London.

== Career ==
Passingham is currently Emeritus Professor of Cognitive Neuroscience at the Department of Experimental Psychology, University of Oxford, and is also an Emeritus Fellow of Wadham College, Oxford. In addition, he is Emeritus Honorary Principal Investigator at the Wellcome Centre for Human Neuroimaging at University College London. His career has been spent at these two institutions, and from 1991 to 1995 also at the MRC Cyclotron Unit at the Hammersmith Hospital London. He has published over 200 research papers and eight books (listed below).

Passingham has transformed our view of the frontal lobes by his work on the monkey and human brain. He carried out early classical studies on the prefrontal cortex in primates, and pioneered our understanding of the premotor and supplementary motor cortex. Together with his later work using brain imaging in humans, he has changed our view of the fundamental role of the prefrontal cortex. He was at the forefront of extending the use of brain imaging from anatomical 'mapping' into physiology. He demonstrated general principles by which the system works as a whole, for example, that the contribution of an area to a task is not static, and that the same area can interact dynamically with one subsystem in one context and with another subsystem in another context.

The workings of the system depend on its anatomical connections. Therefore, Passingham's work is firmly based on these connections. He demonstrated that each cortical area has a unique set of inputs and outputs, and has argued that it is these that mainly determine the functions of the area. However, his work also shows that there are 'families' of areas that show similarities in their inputs and outputs, and these form systems. The anatomical connections that he charted in the macaque brain formed the basis for the anatomical models that he has tested in imaging studies of the human brain, devoted to understanding how one area influences another, for example using structural equation modelling.

Passingham started by investigating each area of the frontal lobes in macaques, and his earlier findings were summarised in his seminal book 'The Frontal Lobes and Voluntary Action' (1993). When brain imaging became available for studies of the human brain, Passingham was amongst the first to use it. He carried out PET studies from 1988 at the Hammersmith Hospital and fMRI studies from 1995 at the Wellcome Trust Centre for Neuroimaging (UCL), where he was among the founding Principal Investigators of the Centre. Thus, for much of his career he had a research group working in Oxford with macaques and rTMS in humans, and a group working with brain imaging of humans in London.

He was elected a Fellow of the Royal Society in 2009 in recognition of his achievements.

=== Bibliography ===
Evolution of the brain and especially the human brainu

- The Human Primate (Freeman, 1982)
- What is Special about the Human Brain (OUP, 2008)

Prefrontal Cortex

- The Frontal Lobes and Voluntary Action (OUP, 1993)
- The Neurobiology of the Prefrontal Cortex (Passingham and Wise; OUP, 2012)

Brain Imaging

- A Short Guide to Brain Imaging (Passingham and Rowe; OUP, 2016)

Cognitive Neuroscience

- A Very Short Introduction to Cognitive Neuroscience (OUP, 2016)

Computational Neuroscience

- Computational Theories and Their Implementation in the Brain (Vaina and Passingham eds; OUP, 2017)

Prefontal Cortex

- Understanding the Prefrontal Cortex: selective advantage, connectivity and neural operations

(OUP, 2021)
