= William Rutty =

English physician

William Rutty M.D. (1687–1730) was an English physician.

== Life ==
He was born in London, and entered Christ's College, Cambridge in 1707, graduating M.B. in 1712 and M.D. on 17 July 1719. He was admitted a candidate or member of the Royal College of Physicians 30 September 1719, and was elected a fellow 30 September 1720. On 13 August 1720 he was a candidate for the osteology lecture at the Barber-Surgeons' Hall, and again 30 October 1721; and was successful when a candidate for the third time on 29 March 1721. On 20 August 1724 he was elected to the viscera lectureship at the same place, and 15 August 1728 to the muscular lectureship.

Rutty was elected a Fellow of the Royal Society 30 June 1720, and became second secretary 30 November 1727. He died on 10 June 1730. The physician John Rutty was a cousin.

== Works ==
In March 1722 Rutty delivered the Gulstonian lectures at the College of Physicians on the anatomy and diseases of the urinary organs, and published them in 1726 as A Treatise of the Urinary Passages, with a dedication to Sir Hans Sloane. The work relates two distinctive cases: one in the practice of John Bamber, lithotomist to St. Bartholomew's Hospital, of calcified concretions in the caecum giving rise to symptoms resembling renal colic; and the other of double renal calculus in the daughter of Sir Hugh Myddelton, from a note by Francis Glisson.

== Notes ==
Attribution

This article incorporates text from a publication now in the public domain: Lee, Sidney, ed. (1897). "Rutty, William". Dictionary of National Biography. Vol. 50. London: Smith, Elder & Co.
