= Benny Phillips =

English football player and manager (born 1960)

Personal information
- Full name: Benjamin Phillips
- Date of birth: 9 June 1960 (age 66)
- Place of birth: Hazel Grove, England
- Position: Right-back

Youth career
- Crewe Alexandra

Senior career*
Years	Team	Apps	(Gls)
1978–1980	Macclesfield Town	10	(2)
1980–1981	Bury	14	(0)
1981	Crewe Alexandra	0	(0)
1981–1982	Stalybridge Celtic		
1982–1983	Mossley		
1983–19??	Witton Albion		
- Winsford United
- Barrow
- Buxton
19??–1990	Rossendale United		
1990–1991	Mossley		
1991–19??	Curzon Ashton		
- Droylsden

Managerial career
- Grove United
- Bramhall
- 1997–2001: Mossley
- 2001–2003: Witton Albion
- 2007–2008: Bradford Park Avenue
- 2011–2015: Radcliffe Borough
- * Club domestic league appearances and goals

Benjamin Phillips (born 9 June 1960) is an English football manager and former professional player who played as a right-back. He played in the Football League for Bury. He is manager of Radcliffe Borough of the Northern Premier League Division One North.

== Playing career ==
Phillips was a junior with Blackpool, Manchester City and Preston North End before joining Macclesfield Town.

He joined Bury in September 1980. He played 14 times that season and was linked with a move to Bolton Wanderers that fell through due to a pelvic injury, but was released and joined Stalybridge Celtic after a brief spell with Crewe Alexandra. He joined Mossley in August 1982 and was voted the supporters' player of the year the following season. He remained a regular the following season until leaving to join Witton Albion following the departure of manager Bob Murphy from the club in December 1983.

He subsequently played for Winsford United, Barrow, Buxton and Rossendale United before rejoining Mossley in November 1990. He left to join Curzon Ashton early in the 1991–92 season, later playing for Droylsden.

== Coaching and managerial career ==
Phillips was assistant manager at Stalybridge Celtic, Congleton Town and Ashton United and managed coached Mid-Cheshire League sides Grove United and Bramhall before taking over as manager of Mossley in July 1997. He left in November 2001 to take over as manager of Witton Albion, resigning in August 2003 after Albion had lost their first three games of the season.

He was later assistant manager of Leek Town (from May 2004 until May 2005), Clitheroe (from June 2005) and Witton Albion before taking over as manager of Bradford Park Avenue in March 2007. He was sacked by Bradford in February 2008, despite the team being in the race for promotion.

He was appointed as first-team coach, under manager Steve Burr, of Stalybridge Celtic in June 2009. He was made caretaker manager of Stalybridge Celtic in January 2010 following Steve Burr's departure to take over Conference National side Kidderminster Harriers. He was appointed manager of Radcliffe Borough in February 2011 by chairman Bernard Manning jnr (son of the late comic Bernard Manning).

Away from football, Phillips used to run a bingo club in Hyde, although he sold the club in 2005 and it closed in 2009.
