= Henry Power =

English physicist and experimenter (1626–1668)

Henry Power FRS (1626–1668) was an English physician and experimenter, one of the first elected fellows of the Royal Society.

== Life ==
Power matriculated as a pensioner of Christ's College, Cambridge, in 1641 and graduated a Bachelor of Arts in 1644. He became a regular correspondent of Sir Thomas Browne, who had lived in Halifax from 1633 to 1635 on scientific subjects. He graduated a Master of Arts in 1648 and a Doctor of Medicine in c. 1655. It appears that he practised his profession at Halifax for some time, but he eventually moved to New Hall, near Elland. Power was elected and admitted a fellow of the Royal Society 1 July 1663, he and Sir Justinian Isham, 2nd Baronet, being the first elected members.

He died at New Hall on 23 December 1668 and was buried in the All Saints' Church, Wakefield, with a brass plate to his memory, with a Latin inscription, on the floor in the middle chancel.

== Works ==
His only published work is 'Experimental Philosophy'. Its three books deal respectively with microscopy and corpuscularian theory; the experiments of Evangelista Torricelli; and the vacuum, and refutations proposed for the works of the Jesuit Jacobus Grandamicus (Jacques Grandami, 1588–1672).

== Boyle's law ==
In a series of experiments with his family friend, Richard Towneley, Henry Power discovered the relationship between the pressure and volume of a gas that later became known as Boyle's law. This relationship was outlined in "Experimental Philosophy". However, many may argue nevertheless that a prepublication manuscript of Experimental Philosophy cited the hypothesis as the sole work of Mr. Richard Towneley. Robert Boyle's mention of the theory preceded the publication of Experimental Philosophy by one year, which, combined with Boyle's promotion of the idea and his significant status as an aristocratic scientist, ensured the theory would be known as "Boyle's law". Boyle attributed Towneley as the sole researcher, ensuring that Power's contributions were all but lost to history.

== In popular culture ==
Henry Power and his contributions were documented by Crash Course Chemistry and Hank Green. The section on Boyle's law contained the sentence "Written By Hank Green, savior of high school children" until July 2017.

== Bibliography ==
- Power, Henry (1664) [5 August 1663]. Experimental Philosophy, in three books containing new experiments: Microscopical, Mercurial and Magnetic. London: Martin and Allestry.

== Notes ==
This article incorporates text from a publication now in the public domain: "Power, Henry". Dictionary of National Biography. London: Smith, Elder & Co. 1885–1900.
