= Benjamin Phillips (surgeon) =

Benjamin Phillips (1805–1861) was a Welsh surgeon. He was elected a Fellow of the Royal Society in 1834.

== Life ==
He was the son of Thomas Phillips of Llanellen House, Monmouthshire, and his wife Ann James, daughter of Benjamin James of Llangattock; he was the younger brother of Sir Thomas Phillips, Mayor of Newport. Their sister Mary married the Rev. William Price, vicar of Llanarth, and was mother of Thomas Phillips Price.

Phillips was a medical student at Bristol Infirmary under the surgeon Henry Daniel (1783–1859), whose wife Cecilia James was from Lansoar House, Llandegveth, Monmouthshire. After studying at London University, he went to Paris in 1829, returning on the July Revolution the following year. He set up in practice as a surgeon in London, and was appointed to the St Marylebone Parish Infirmary.

In 1843 Phillips was in practice at 17 Wimpole Street. That year he was appointed assistant surgeon at the Westminster Hospital to Anthony White, who had been surgeon there from 1823. In 1846 White retired, and Phillips was his replacement.

Phillips died in Gloucester Place, London, on 11 June 1861. In poor health, he had retired some years before that.

== Works ==
Phillips published:

- A Series of Experiments performed for the purpose of shewing that arteries may be obliterated without ligature, compression, or the knife (1832). Dedicated to Henry Brougham, 1st Baron Brougham and Vaux. A review of the book stated that the experiments had already been performed, by Jean Zuléma Amussat and Alfred-Armand-Louis-Marie Velpeau. Later Phillips innovated by passing an electric current through a needle across an artery, to increase the clot formed on it. This technique was developed with a view to treating aneurysms. As "galvano-puncture", it was taken up in the 1840s by Luigi Ciniselli (1803–1878) in Cremona.
- A Treatise on the Urethra: Its Diseases, Especially Stricture, and Their Cure (1832). Dedicated to Henry Halford. After a review, Phillips defended himself against the charge of advocating a technique of the French urologist Théodore Joseph Ducamp without proper attribution.
- Epidemia, Contagion and Infection, with their remedies, an essay: to which is added an enquiry into the mode by which cholera is propagated (1832)
- Scrofula: Its Nature, Its Causes, Its Prevalence, and the Principles of Treatment (1846)

In 1837 Phillips read a paper before the Royal Medical and Chirurgical Society, suggesting that statistical methods should be applied to surgery. In 1843, after he had performed an experimental and unsuccessful operation for ovariotomy (in 1840 at the Marylebone Infirmary), he published a statistical table, arguing that under-reporting was leading to under-estimation of the operation's risk.

== Family ==
Phillips married in 1832 Elizabeth Page, daughter of William Woods Page of Woodbridge, Suffolk, son of the surgeon John Page, and his wife Charlotte Sheppard. They had an only son William Page Thomas Phillips (1833–1905).
