= Richard Penn (FRS) =

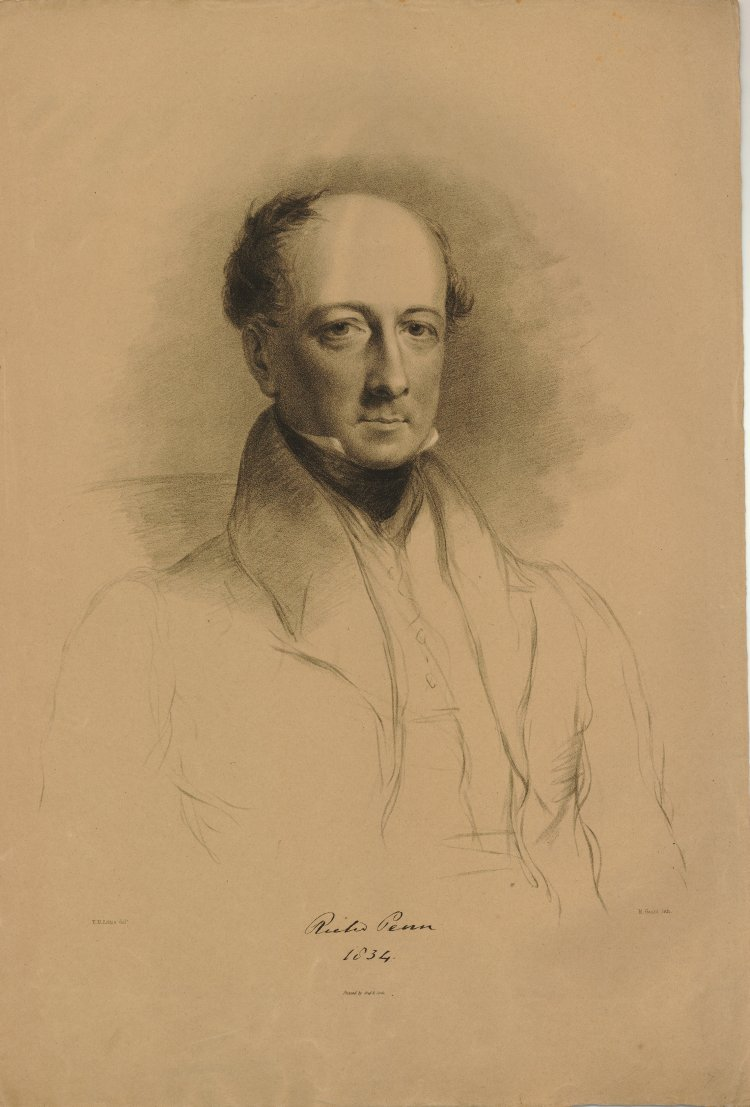
- Penn, 1834 lithograph
- Born: 1784
- Died: 21 April 1863 (aged 78–79); Richmond, London
- Father: Richard Penn (governor)

Richard Penn (1784–1863) was an English official of the Colonial Office and writer, the younger son of Richard Penn (1736–1811) the Member of Parliament. He was elected a Fellow of the Royal Society on 18 November 1824, and died unmarried at Richmond, Surrey, on 21 April 1863.

== Works ==
Penn wrote:

- On a New Mode of Secret Writing, 1829, on a cipher.
- Maxims and Hints for an Angler, and Miseries of Fishing, illustrated by Sir Francis Chantrey London, 1833, with Maxims and Hints for a Chess Player, with portrait-caricatures by Chantrey of the author and himself. An enlarged edition was published in 1839, and another, containing Maxims and Hints on Shooting, appeared in 1855.

== Notes ==
Attribution

This article incorporates text from a publication now in the public domain: Lee, Sidney, ed. (1895). "Penn, Richard". Dictionary of National Biography. Vol. 44. London: Smith, Elder & Co.
