= Colin Prentice =

English ecologist (born 1952)

Colin Prentice FRS
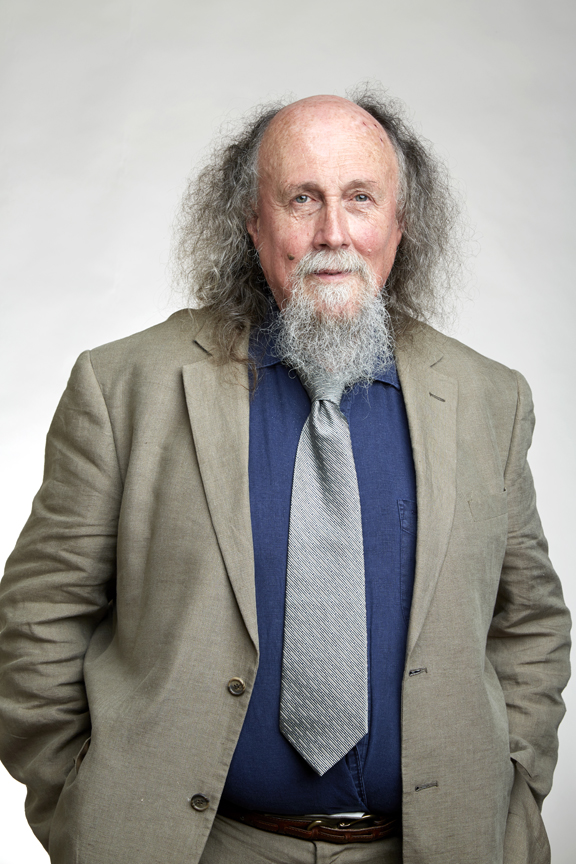
- Prentice in 2018
- Born: Iain Colin Prentice; 25 June 1952 (age 73)
- Education: University of Cambridge (BA, PhD)
- Scientific career
- Fields: Carbon; Climate change; Ecosystems; Global change; Vegetation
- Institutions: Imperial College London; Macquarie University; University of Bristol; Max Planck Institute for Biogeochemistry; Lund University; Uppsala University; Utrecht University; University of Southampton; Newcastle University; University of Bergen
- Thesis: Studies on modern pollen spectra
- Website: imperial.ac.uk/people/c.prentice

Iain Colin Prentice (born 25 June 1952) is a British ecologist who holds the AXA chair in biosphere and climate impacts at Imperial College London and an honorary chair in ecology and evolution at Macquarie University in Australia.

== Education ==
Prentice was educated at the University of Cambridge where he studied the natural sciences tripos and was awarded a Bachelor of Arts degree in 1973 followed by a PhD in botany in 1977 for studies on pollen spectra.

== Career and research ==
Prentice has held academic and research leadership appointments in several countries, including the chair of plant ecology at Lund University and a founding directorship of the Max Planck Institute for Biogeochemistry. He led the research programme quantifying and understanding the earth system for the Natural Environment Research Council (NERC). He developed the standard model for pollen source area, popularized now widely used techniques to analyse species composition along environmental gradients, and led the international development of successive generations of large-scale ecosystem models – from equilibrium biogeography (BIOME) to coupled biogeochemistry and vegetation dynamics (LPJ). As of 2018 his research applies eco-evolutionary optimality concepts to develop and test new quantitative theory for plant and ecosystem function and land-atmosphere exchanges of energy, water and carbon dioxide, with the goal of more robust and reliable numerical modelling of land processes in the earth system science.
