= David Richardson (physicist) =

British optoelectronics researcher (born 1964)

David Richardson FRS FREng
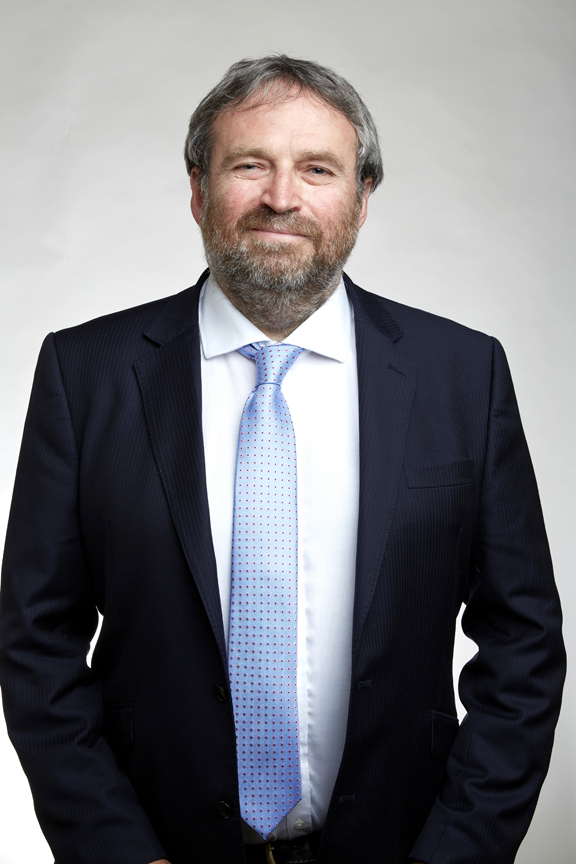
- Richardson in 2018
- Born: David John Richardson; 1964 (age 61–62)
- Education: Taunton’s College
- Alma mater: University of Sussex
- Awards: Royal Society Wolfson Research Merit Award (2013); John Tyndall Award (2024); IEEE Photonics Award (2025)
- Scientific career
- Fields: Photonics; Optical Fibers; Optical communications; Lasers; Nonlinear optics
- Institutions: Microsoft, University of Southampton
- Thesis: The production of, and experiments with, monochromatic ultra cold neutrons (1989)
- Website: www.orc.soton.ac.uk/people/djr1

David John Richardson (born 1964) is a British optoelectronics researcher and fellow of both the Royal Society (FRS) and the Royal Academy of Engineering (FREng). He is currently a Partner Researcher at Microsoft, based in Romsey, UK, where he leads research on hollow core optical fiber technology—an approach that guides light through an air-filled core rather than conventional solid glass. Before joining Microsoft, he spent 34 years at the Optoelectronics Research Centre (ORC) at the University of Southampton. While at the ORC, he served as Professor, Deputy Director, and Head of the Fibre and Laser Group, making significant contributions to advanced optical fibre and laser research.

== Education ==
Richardson was educated at St George’s Roman Catholic School, Southampton and Taunton’s College. He completed his Bachelor of Science degree and PhD in Physics at the University of Sussex in 1989.

== Career and research ==
Richardson is a pioneer in the field of photonics, best known for his work on fibre optics and their applications. He has played a leading role in developing techniques to scale the data-carrying capacity of future optical communication networks to keep up with society's demand for ever increasing internet bandwidth. He has developed optical fibres of high performance – capable, for example, of transmitting large quantities of data across the internet at high speed.

Richardson was also one of the first to demonstrate the potential of compact, flexible, pulsed fibre lasers operating over a broad range of powers, pulse durations and wavelengths. Over many years he has extended the performance limits of fibre lasers, making them strong contenders to conventional lasers and contributing to their commercial success. His work extends to fibres capable of delivering kilowatts of optical power for manufacturing with lasers.
