= Matthew Rushworth =

British academic and professor

Matthew Rushworth FRS
- Born: Matthew F. S. Rushworth
- Education: University of Oxford (MA, DPhil)
- Scientific career
- Fields: Neuroscience
- Workplaces: University of Oxford
- Thesis: The parietal cortex and apraxia (1997)
- Doctoral advisor: Richard Passingham
- Website: www.psy.ox.ac.uk/team/matthew-rushworth

Matthew F. S. Rushworth is a British academic who is Watts Professor of Experimental Psychology at the University of Oxford where his laboratory is funded by the Wellcome Trust and Medical Research Council.

== Education ==
Rushworth studied Experimental Psychology at the University of Oxford where he worked with Richard Passingham. He was awarded a Doctor of Philosophy degree in 1994 for research on the parietal cortex and apraxia.

== Research and career ==
Rushworth's research has focussed on understanding brain circuits for learning, decision making, and social cognition. He developed methods for comparing brain circuits in humans and other animals and for manipulating the activity in one brain area and examining the impact on interconnected regions and on behaviour. He showed that prefrontal cortex and cingulate cortex brain regions enable us to learn links between our choices and their consequences, make decisions on the basis of our expectations of the outcomes, and think about alternative and counterfactual choices. He has shown how brain activity changes in social contexts and when we learn not just by ourselves but from others.

Awarded a Royal Society Locke Research Fellowship he began working with neuroimaging techniques at the Oxford centre for Functional Magnetic Resonance Imaging of the Brain and Wellcome Trust Centre for Integrative Neuroimaging (WIN).

=== Awards and honours ===
Rushworth was elected a Fellow of the Royal Society (FRS) in 2019.
