= Roger Paman =

British Mathematician (c. 1700–1748)

- Born: c. 1700; England
- Died: 1748 (aged 47–48); Unknown
- Known for: Opposition to Berkeley
- Scientific career
- Fields: Mathematics

Roger Paman (c. 1700 - 1748) was an 18th-century English mathematician.

== Life and work ==
Very little is known about the life of Roger Paman. He cited a professor of St John's College, Cambridge as mentor, so it is possible that he studied at Cambridge University.

As he explains in the preface of his only published book, he participated in George Anson's voyage around the world (1740–1744), but he returned to England in 1742 with one of two ships which returned before the end of the expedition. Before embarking on the expedition, he left his mathematical papers to philosopher David Hartley.

His papers were presented to the Royal Society in 1742 and, as a result, he was named fellow of the institution in 1743.

In 1745 his book "The Harmony of the Ancient and Modern Geometry Asserted" was published in London. The book is a reply to the mathematical concepts of George Berkeley in his book The Analyst (1734). The originality of this book lies in the development of all the calculus in finite differences, in order to avoid the paradoxes of infinity explained by Berkeley. Paman presents in his book the concepts of minimaius and maximinus, a far antecedent of the mathematical concepts of infimum and supremum.

== Bibliography ==
- Appleby, John H (2001). "Mapping Russia: Farquharson, Delisle and the Royal Society". Notes and Records of the Royal Society of London. 55 (2): 191–204. doi:10.1098/rsnr.2001.0138. ISSN 0035-9149.
- Breidert, Wolfgang (1989). George Berkeley 1685–1753. Birkhauser. doi:10.1007/978-3-0348-7248-5. ISBN 978-3-0348-7249-2.
- Jesseph, Douglas M (1993). Berkeley's Philosophy of Mathematics. University of Chicago Press. ISBN 978-0-226-39897-6.
