= Tullio Pozzan =

Italian biomedical researcher (1949–2022)

Tullio Pozzan ForMemRS FRSC
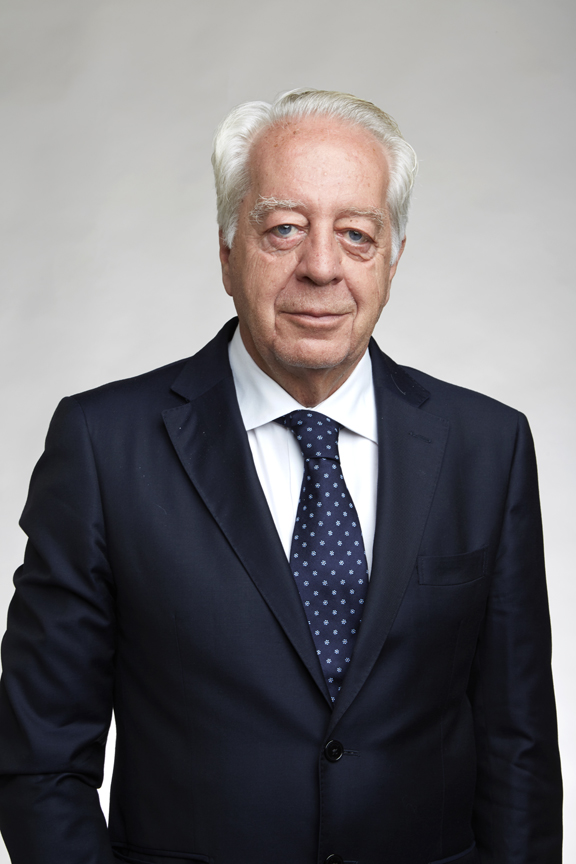
- Pozzan in 2018
- Born: 22 February 1949
- Died: 15 October 2022 (aged 73)
- Education: University of Padua
- Awards: EMBO Member
- Scientific career
- Fields: Calcium in biology
- Institutions: University of Padua; National Research Council; University of Cambridge
- Website: www.biomed.unipd.it/people/pozzan-tullio

Tullio Pozzan (22 February 1949 – 15 October 2022) was an Italian biochemist who was professor at the University of Padua and head of the department of biomedical sciences of the Italian National Research Council.

== Early life ==
Pozzan was born in Venice on 22 February 1949. He was born into a family associated with the medical profession, including a grandfather whom he was named after. Pozzan studied Medicine at the University of Padua and received a doctor of medicine degree in 1973.

== Career and research ==
Pozzan was a postdoctoral researcher at the University of Cambridge. He became a full professor of general pathology at the University of Padua in 1986 and served as the director of the university's Department of Experimental Biomedical Sciences from 1992 to 2003. From 2009 Pozzan was director of the National Research Council of Italy's Institute of Neuroscience.

Pozzan's main scientific interest has been the study of Calcium in biology and its role in second messenger systems. His interests in calcium signaling (Ca^{2+}) began with the characterization of Ca^{2+} uptake and release in mitochondria. In collaboration with Roger Y. Tsien, he participated in the development of the intracellular trappable fluorescent Ca^{2+} indicators. His research group developed the first genetically encoded probes with selective subcellular localization. This new approach led to a series of discoveries on the mechanisms of calcium metabolism and in particular it revolutionized the understanding of mitochondrial role in cellular Ca^{2+} homeostasis. He was also interested in the signaling pathway controlled by cyclic adenosine monophosphate (cAMP). His group generated the first genetically encoded fluorescent cAMP probe, contributed to establishing the concept of cAMP microdomains and described the existence of an autonomous cAMP homeostatic mechanism within the matrix of mitochondria.

=== Awards and honours ===
Pozzan was member of the European Molecular Biology Organization (EMBO), of the Accademia dei Lincei, the National Academy of Sciences of the United States and a Fellow of the Royal Society of Canada (FRSC). He was elected a Foreign Member of the Royal Society (ForMemRS) in 2018.

== Retirement and death ==
Pozzan retired from academia in 2019. He died on the afternoon of 15 October 2022, following a brief illness during which he was nursed by his wife Carla.
