= List of fellows of the Royal Society J, K, L =

About 8,000 fellows have been elected to the Royal Society of London since its inception in 1660. Below is a list of people who are or were Fellow or Foreign Member of the Royal Society. The date of election to the fellowship follows the name. Dates in brackets relate to an award or event associated with the person. The Society maintains complete online list. This list is complete up to and including 2019.

List of fellows and foreign members of the Royal Society
| A, B, C | D, E, F | G, H, I | J, K, L | M, N, O | P, Q, R | S, T, U, V | W, X, Y, Z |

== List of fellows ==
=== J ===
| Name | Election date | Notes |
|---|---|---|
| Daniel Ernest Jablonski | 11 June 1713 | 20 November 1660 – 25 May 1741, German theologian, and reformer |
| James Julian Bennett Jack | 15 May 1997 | |
| Kenneth Henderson Jack | 20 March 1980 | 12 October 1918 – 28 January 2013 |
| Sir David Jack | 12 March 1992 | 22 February 1924 – 8 November 2011 Pharmacologist, Glaxo |
| Cyril Jackson | 16 January 1772 | 1746 – 31 August 1819 |
| Derek Ainslie Jackson | 20 March 1947 | 23 June 1906 – 20 February 1982 |
| Henry Bradwardine Jackson | 6 June 1901 | 21 January 1855 – 14 December 1929 |
| Herbert Jackson | 3 May 1917 | 17 March 1863 – 10 December 1936 Chemist |
| Humphry Jackson | 19 November 1772 | 1717 – ? 29 June 1801 Chemist |
| James Anthony Jackson | 9 May 2002 | |
| John Jackson | 17 March 1938 | 12 February 1887 – 9 December 1958 |
| John Jackson | 30 November 1694 | c. 1672–1724 |
| John Hughlings Jackson | 6 June 1878 | 4 April 1835 – 7 October 1911 |
| Julian Jackson | 3 April 1845 | 30 March 1790 – 16 March 1853 Colonel (Russian Army) and geographer |
| Richard James Jackson | 18 May 2006 | |
| Roy Jackson | 11 May 2000 | Prof. of Chem. Eng., Princeton. |
| Samuel Jackson | 8 November 1798 | fl 1798 surgeon |
| Stephen Philip Jackson | 16 May 2008 | Professor of Biology, Cambridge |
| William Lawies Jackson, 1st Baron Allerton | 5 February 1891 | 17 February 1840 – 4 April 1917 |
| Willis Jackson, Baron Jackson of Burnley | 19 March 1953 | 30 October 1904 – 17 February 1970 Fellow 19 March 1953 |
| William Jacob | 23 April 1807 | c. 1762 – ? 17 December 1851 |
| Joannes Adolphus Jacobaeus | 25 June 1724 | 21 May 1698 – 3 August 1772 Professor of Medicine |
| Patricia Ann Jacobs | 11 March 1993 | geneticist. |
| Theodore Jacobsen | 22 June 1727 | 25 April 1772 |
| Francis Jacquier | 10 December 1741 | 7 June 1711 – 3 July 1788 |
| Nicolas Joseph Jacquin | 3 April 1788 | 17 February 1727 – ? 24 October 1817 |
| John Conrad Jaeger | 19 March 1970 | 30 July 1907 – 15 May 1979 |
| James Jago | 2 June 1870 | 18 December 1815 – 18 January 1893 |
| Eric Jakeman | 15 March 1990 | |
| Jean Jallabert | 13 November 1740 | 26 July 1712 – 11 March 1768 |
| James II, King of Great Britain and Ireland | 9 January 1665 | 14 October 1633 – 6 September 1701 |
| Anthony Trafford James | 17 March 1983 | 6 March 1922 – 7 December 2006 |
| Henry James | 9 June 1848 | 8 June 1803 – 14 June 1877 |
| Ioan Mackenzie James | 21 March 1968 | |
| Michael Norman George James | 16 March 1989 | |
| Reginald William James | 17 March 1955 | 9 January 1891 – 7 July 1964 |
| Sydney Price James | 7 May 1931 | 17 September 1870 – 17 April 1946 Army physician |
| William James | 30 March 1775 | c. 1721 – 16 December 1783 |
| William James | 9 April 1767 | 11 December 1786 |
| William Owen James | 20 March 1952 | 21 May 1900 – 15 September 1978 Botanist, Oxford University |
| Guy Antony Jameson | 9 March 1995 | |
| Graeme Jameson | 2018-05-09 | 1936 |
| Robert Jameson | 25 May 1826 | 11 July 1774 – 19 April 1854 |
| Robin Ralph Jamison | 20 March 1969 | 12 July 1912 – 18 March 1991 |
| Francis Robert Japp | 4 June 1885 | 9 February 1848 – 1 August 1925 |
| William Jardine | 7 June 1860 | 24 February 1800 – 21 November 1874 |
| William Fleming Hoggan Jarrett | 20 March 1980 | 2 January 1927 – 27 August 2011 |
| Paul Gordon Jarvis | 15 May 1997 | 23 May 1935 – 5 February 2013 |
| Jacobus Jattica | 12 February 1736 | fl 1736 |
| Louis de Jaucourt | 8 January 1756 | 27 September 1704 – 3 February 1780 |
| James Hopwood Jeans | 3 May 1906 | 11 September 1877 – 16 September 1946 |
| John Jebb | 18 February 1779 | 17 February 1736 – 2 March 1786 |
| John Jebb | 26 February 1824 | 27 September 1775 – 9 December 1833 |
| Richard Jebb | 28 March 1765 | ? October 1729 – 4 July 1787 physician |
| Geoffrey Jefferson | 20 March 1947 | 10 April 1886 – 29 January 1961 |
| George Barker Jeffery | 6 May 1926 | 9 May 1891 – 27 April 1956 |
| Henry Martyn Jeffery | 3 June 1880 | 5 January 1826 – 3 November 1891 |
| Edward Jeffreys | 28 October 1669 | fl 1655–1702 |
| Alec John Jeffreys | 20 March 1986 | |
| Harold Jeffreys | 7 May 1925 | 22 April 1891 – 18 March 1989 |
| John Jeffreys | 12 May 1726 | 20 July 1741 |
| John Gwyn Jeffreys | 2 April 1840 | 18 January 1809 – 24 January 1885 |
| Julius Jeffreys | 7 January 1841 | ? 1801 – 13 May 1877 |
| Walter Jeffreys | 14 November 1717 | fl 1717–1753 |
| Joseph Jekyll | 3 June 1790 | 1 January 1754 – 8 March 1837 Barrister & MP |
| Joseph Jekyll | 5 June 1834 | 23 September 1802 – 23 November 1841 Son of above. |
| George Patrick John Rushworth Jellicoe, 2nd Earl Jellicoe | 28 June 1990 | 5 April 1918 – 22 February 2007 |
| Henry Jenkes | 30 November 1674 | August 1697 |
| Charles Frewen Jenkin | 7 May 1931 | 24 September 1865 – 23 August 1940 |
| Henry Charles Fleeming Jenkin | 1 June 1865 | 25 March 1833 – 12 June 1885 |
| Richard Jenkins | 18 February 1841 | 19 February 1785 – 30 December 1853 Civil Servant & MP of Shrewsbury |
| David Stewart Jenkinson | 14 March 1991 | 25 February 1928 – 16 February 2011 Soil Scientist Rothamsted |
| Robert Banks Jenkinson, 2nd Earl of Liverpool | 22 May 1794 | 7 June 1770 – 4 December 1828 |
| Edward Jenner | 26 February 1789 | 17 May 1749 – 26 January 1823 |
| William Jenner | 2 June 1864 | 30 January 1815 – 11 December 1898 |
| John Jennings | 18 November 1779 | fl 1779 |
| Philip Jennings | 1 March 1821 | c. 1783 – 20 December 1849 |
| Niels Kaj Jerne | 20 March 1980 | 23 December 1911 – 7 October 1994 |
| John Jervis, 1st Earl of St Vincent | 21 December 1809 | 9 January 1735 – 14 March 1823 |
| Thomas Best Jervis | 15 March 1838 | 2 August 1794 – 3 April 1857 |
| William Francis Drummond Jervois | 7 June 1888 | 10 September 1821 – 16 August 1897 |
| John Jesse | 5 May 1842 | 6 January 1801 – 26 September 1863 Amateur naturalist of Llanbedr Hall, Wales. |
| George Jessel | 25 November 1880 | 14 February 1824 – 21 March 1883, Solicitor General (1871–1873) |
| Thomas Michael Jessell | 14 March 1996 | |
| Thomas Jett | 30 November 1714 | 1 July 1730 Barrister |
| William Stanley Jevons | 6 June 1872 | 1 September 1835 – 13 August 1882 |
| Harren Jhoti | 2018-05-09 | 1962 – |
| John Leonard Jinks | 19 March 1970 | 21 October 1929 – 6 June 1987 |
| Joao, Duke of Braganza | 17 November 1757 | 1719–1806 |
| Richard Paul Jodrell | 9 January 1772 | 13 November 1745 – 26 January 1831 |
| Paul Jodrell | 15 November 1781 | 12 November 1746 – 6 August 1803 |
| Archduke John of Austria | 8 February 1816 | 1782–1859 Royal |
| Alan Woodworth Johnson | 18 March 1965 | 29 September 1917 – 5 December 1982 Chemist |
| Barry Edward Johnson | 16 March 1978 | 1 August 1937 – 5 May 2002 Mathematician |
| Brian Frederick Gilbert Johnson | 14 March 1991 | |
| Cuthbert William Johnson | 10 March 1842 | 21 September 1799 – 8 March 1878 Barrister |
| Edward John Johnson | 10 March 1836 | ? 1795 – 7 February 1853 |
| George Johnson | 6 June 1872 | 29 November 1818 – 3 June 1896 Physician |
| George Henry Sacheverell Johnson | 18 January 1838 | 1808 – 4 November 1881 Mathematician |
| James Rawlins Johnson | 26 June 1817 | 1840 Physician |
| Kenneth Langstreth Johnson | 18 March 1982 | |
| Louise Napier Johnson | 15 March 1990 | |
| Manuel John Johnson | 5 June 1856 | 23 May 1805 – 28 February 1859 |
| Martin Johnson | 30 April 2014 | Physiologist, Cambridge University |
| Percival Norton Johnson | 30 April 1846 | 1793 – 1 June 1866 |
| Robert Augustus Johnson | 17 April 1788 | 1745 – 9 January 1799 |
| William Johnson | 18 March 1982 | 20 April 1922 – 13 June 2010 Prof. of Mech Eng, Cambridge Univ. |
| Philip Nicholas Johnson-Laird | 14 March 1991 | |
| Alexander Johnston | 22 November 1810 | 25 April 1775 – 6 March 1849 |
| James Finlay Weir Johnston | 15 June 1837 | 13 September 1796 – 18 September 1855 |
| John Johnstone | 18 March 1813 | 1768 – 28 December 1836 physician |
| Charles Jasper Joly | 5 May 1904 | 27 June 1864 – 4 January 1906 |
| John Joly | 2 June 1892 | 1 November 1857 – 8 December 1933 |
| Bennett Melvill Jones | 16 March 1939 | 28 January 1887 – 31 October 1975 Prof. of Aeronautical Eng., Cambridge Univ. |
| Charles Handfield Jones | 6 June 1850 | 1 October 1819 – 30 September 1890 physician |
| Douglas Samuel Jones | 21 March 1968 | 10 January 1922 – 27 November 2013 Mathematician |
| E. Yvonne Jones | 2017-05-05 | |
| Ewart Ray Herbert Jones | 16 March 1950 | 16 March 1911 – 7 May 2002 |
| Francis Edgar Jones | 16 March 1967 | 16 January 1914 – 10 April 1988 electronics, co-developed "Oboe" |
| Frederic Wood Jones | 7 May 1925 | 23 January 1879 – 29 September 1954 |
| Geoffrey Melvill Jones | 15 March 1979 | |
| Harry Jones | 20 March 1952 | 12 April 1905 – 15 December 1986 Prof of Mathematics |
| Henry Jones | 27 June 1723 | January 1727 |
| Henry Bence Jones | 30 April 1846 | 31 December 1813 – 20 April 1873 |
| Humphrey Owen Jones | 2 May 1912 | 20 February 1878 – 12 August 1912 |
| John Kenyon Netherton Jones | 21 March 1957 | 28 January 1912 – 13 April 1977 chemist, Bristol University |
| John Viriamu Jones | 7 June 1894 | 2 January 1856 – 2 June 1901 |
| Jonathan Dallas George Jones | 15 May 2003 | |
| Owen Thomas Jones | 6 May 1926 | 16 April 1878 – 5 May 1967 |
| Reginald Victor Jones | 18 March 1965 | 29 September 1911 – 17 December 1997 |
| Richard Anthony Lewis Jones | 18 May 2006 | |
| Richard Jones, 1st Earl of Ranelagh | 20 May 1663 | 9 February 1641 – 5 January 1712 Original Fellow |
| Roger Jones | 18 March 1736 | 1748 Physician & Natural Historian |
| Steve Jones | 2012 | 24 March 1944 - |
| Thomas Jones | 4 June 1835 | 24 June 1775 – 29 July 1852 Optician |
| Thomas Alwyn Jones | 12 March 1992 | |
| Thomas Rupert Jones | 6 June 1872 | 1 October 1819 – 13 April 1911 Physician & Prof of Geology |
| Thomas Rymer Jones | 21 March 1844 | 20 March 1810 – 10 December 1880 Prof of Physiology, London |
| Thomas Tyrwhitt Jones | 9 January 1800 | 1765 – 26 November 1811 MP |
| Thomas Wharton Jones | 30 April 1840 | 9 January 1808 – ? 7 November 1891 Surgeon |
| Vaughan Frederick Randal Jones | 15 March 1990 | |
| William Jones | 30 November 1711 | 1675 – ? 1 July 1749 |
| William Jones | 30 April 1772 | 28 September 1746 – 27 April 1794 |
| William Jones | 22 June 1775 | 30 July 1726 – 6 January 1800 |
| Carole Jordan | 15 March 1990 | astrophysicist |
| Gibbes Walker Jordan | 29 May 1800 | c. 1757 – 16 February 1823 barrister |
| Heinrich Ernst Karl Jordan | 5 May 1932 | 7 December 1861 – 12 January 1959 |
| John Philip Jordis | 27 April 1681 | fl 1681–1715 |
| Brian David Josephson | 19 March 1970 | physicist, Nobel Prize (1973) |
| James Prescott Joule | 6 June 1850 | 24 December 1818 – 11 October 1889 |
| Bruce Arthur Joyce | 11 May 2000 | |
| Dominic Joyce | 2012 | |
| Charles Joye | 17 November 1748 | ? 1719 – ? April 1776 |
| Richard Jozsa | 2019-04-16 | 13 November 1953 – |
| Jorge Juan y Santacilia | 9 November 1749 | ? 5 January 1713 – ? 21 June 1773 |
| John Wesley Judd | 7 June 1877 | 19 February 1840 – 3 March 1916 |
| Alfred John Jukes-Browne | 6 May 1909 | 16 April 1851 – 14 August 1914 |
| Joseph Beete Jukes | 2 June 1853 | 10 October 1811 – 29 July 1869 |
| Calestous Juma | 18 May 2006 | |
| James Jurin | 1 April 1756 | c. 1731 – 3 July 1762 Commissioner for Peace, Northumberland |
| James Jurin | 14 November 1717 | ? December 1684 – 29 March 1750 |
| Antoine de Jussieu | 11 December 1718 | 6 July 1686 – 22 April 1758 |
| Bernard de Jussieu | 22 June 1727 | 17 August 1699 – 6 November 1777 |
| John Obadiah Justamond | 14 December 1775 | 14 October 1737 – 27 March 1786 Surgeon |
| Henry Justel | 7 December 1681 | 1620 – ? 24 September 1693 |
| James Justice | 22 October 1730 | fl 1730–1757 Horticulturalist |

=== K ===
| Name | Election date | Notes |
|---|---|---|
| Alejandro Kacelnik | 2011-05-19 | |
| Franz Daniel Kahn | 11 March 1993 | 14 May 1926 – ? 8 February 1998 |
| Nicholas Kaiser | 16 May 2008 | |
| George Ernest Kalmus | 17 March 1988 | |
| Sophien Kamoun | 2018-05-09 | 8 December 1965 – |
| Yuet Wai Kan | 19 March 1981 | |
| Robert John Kane | 7 June 1849 | 25 September 1809 – 16 February 1890 |
| Gagandeep Kang | 2019-04-16 | 3 November 1962 – |
| Charles Kuen Kao | 15 May 1997 | |
| Piotr Leonidovich Kapitza | 2 May 1929 | 26 June 1894 – 8 April 1984 |
| Jack Henri Kaplan | 9 March 1995 | |
| Victoria Michelle Kaspi | 2010-05-20 | |
| Basil Kassanis | 17 March 1966 | 16 October 1911 – 23 March 1985 |
| Abraham Gotthelf Kastner | 30 April 1789 | 27 September 1719 – 20 June 1800 |
| Edward Kater | 19 November 1840 | 1816 – 6 July 1866 |
| Henry Kater | 15 December 1814 | 16 April 1777 – 26 April 1835 |
| Alan Roy Katritzky | 20 March 1980 | |
| Bernard Katz | 20 March 1952 | 26 March 1911 – 20 April 2003, Nobel Prize for Medicine (1970) |
| Herbert Davenport Kay | 22 March 1945 | 9 September 1893 – 24 November 1976 |
| Joseph Henry Kay | 26 February 1846 | 1814 – 17 July 1875 |
| Lewis Edward Kay | 2010-05-20 | |
| Steve A. Kay | 2019-04-16 | 4 October 1959 – |
| George William Clarkson Kaye | 16 March 1939 | 8 April 1880 – 16 April 1941 physicist, radiologist |
| John Kaye | 7 March 1811 | 28 December 1783 – 18 February 1853 |
| John William Kaye | 7 June 1866 | 1814 – 24 July 1876 |
| Richard Kaye | 5 December 1765 | 1736–1809 Clergyman, York |
| John Kearney | 15 May 1806 | 1741 – 22 May 1813 |
| Frank Kearton, Baron Kearton | 16 March 1961 | 18 February 1911 – 2 July 1992 |
| George Keate | 23 January 1766 | 30 November 1729 – 28 June 1797 |
| Thomas Keate | 27 March 1794 | 1745 – 5 July 1821 Surgeon, Chelsea Hospital |
| Jonathan Peter Keating | 15 May 2009 | |
| Robert Keck | 11 March 1714 | c. 1686 – 10 September 1719 Barrister |
| Frederick William Keeble | 1 May 1913 | 2 March 1870 – 19 October 1952 Prof. of Botany, Univ. Coll., Reading |
| Bernard Augustus Keen | 16 May 1935 | 5 September 1890 – 5 August 1981 Agriculturalist |
| Benjamin Keene | 31 January 1745 | 1697 – 15 December 1757 |
| Peter Keightley | 30 April 2014 | Geneticist, University of Edinburgh |
| David Keilin | 10 May 1928 | 22 March 1887 – 27 February 1963 |
| James Keill | 20 March 1712 | 27 March 1673 – 16 July 1719 |
| John Keill | 30 November 1700 | 1 December 1671 – 31 August 1721 |
| James Keir | 8 December 1785 | 29 September 1735 – 11 October 1820 |
| Arthur Keith | 1 May 1913 | 6 February 1866 – 7 January 1955 |
| Ralph Ambrose Kekwick | 17 March 1966 | 11 November 1908 – 17 January 2000 |
| Philip Kelland | 6 December 1838 | 17 October 1808 – 7 May 1879 |
| Charles Halliley Kellaway | 14 March 1940 | 16 January 1889 – 13 December 1952 |
| Andrew Keller | 16 March 1972 | 23 August 1925 – 8 February 1999, U.S. mathematician |
| Anthony Kelly | 15 March 1973 | Materials scientist |
| Francis Patrick Kelly | 16 March 1989 | |
| Michael Joseph Kelly | 11 March 1993 | |
| Henry Kelsall | 27 May 1736 | c. 1693 – 10 February 1762 |
| Charles Kemball | 18 March 1965 | 27 March 1923 – 4 September 1998 |
| Nicholas Kemmer | 15 March 1956 | 7 December 1911 – 21 October 1998 |
| Bruce Ernest Kemp | 9 May 2002 | |
| David Thomas Kemp | 27 May 2004 | |
| Stanley Wells Kemp | 7 May 1931 | 14 June 1882 – 16 May 1945 |
| John Kempe | 20 March 1712 | 1665 – 19 September 1717 Antiquary |
| Alfred Bray Kempe | 2 June 1881 | 6 July 1849 – 21 April 1922 |
| David George Kendall | 19 March 1964 | |
| James Pickering Kendall | 12 May 1927 | 30 July 1889 – 14 June 1978 |
| John Kendall | 12 March 1724 | 1 January 1735 barrister |
| John-Michael Kendall | 2019-04-16 | |
| Kevin Kendall | 11 March 1993 | |
| Percy Fry Kendall | 15 May 1924 | 15 November 1856 – 19 March 1936 |
| John Cowdery Kendrew | 24 March 1960 | 24 March 1917 – 23 August 1997 |
| Olga Kennard | 19 March 1987 | crystallographer |
| Ernest Laurence Kennaway | 3 May 1934 | 23 May 1881 – 1 January 1958 |
| Archibald Kennedy, 1st Marquess of Ailsa | 18 February 1819 | February 1770 – 8 September 1846 |
| Gilbert Kennedy | 23 February 1738 | c. 1692 – 29 December 1780 Physician of Lisbon |
| John Stodart Kennedy | 18 April 1965 | 20 May 1912 – 4 February 1993 entomologist |
| Alexander Blackie William Kennedy | 9 June 1887 | 17 March 1847 – 1 November 1928 |
| William Quarrier Kennedy | 17 March 1949 | 30 November 1903 – 13 March 1979 |
| George Wallace Kenner | 19 March 1964 | 16 November 1922 – 26 June 1978 |
| James Kenner | 7 May 1925 | 13 April 1885 – 30 June 1974 |
| Brian Leslie Norman Kennett | 26 May 2005 | |
| Benjamin Kennicott | 16 February 1764 | 4 April 1718 – 18 August 1783 |
| Robert Charles Kennicutt | 2011-05-19 | |
| Percy Edward Kent | 17 March 1966 | 18 March 1913 – 9 July 1986 |
| Joseph Kenyon | 7 May 1936 | 8 April 1885 – 12 November 1961 Chemistry teacher |
| Charles Henry Bellenden Ker | 10 June 1819 | c. 1785 – 2 November 1871 |
| John Ker, 1st Duke of Roxburghe | 28 May 1707 | c. 1680 – 24 February 1741 |
| Robert Ker | 25 January 1776 | fl 1776 Ship's Captain, East India Coy |
| Theodor Kerckring | 17 January 1678 | 1640 – 2 November 1693 |
| Oleg Alexander Kerensky | 19 March 1970 | 16 April 1905 – 25 June 1984 |
| Thomas Kerigan | 29 February 1844 | 1848 |
| William Ogilvy Kermack | 16 March 1944 | 26 April 1898 – 20 July 1970 |
| Allen Kerr | 20 March 1986 | |
| Ian Macpherson Kerr | 21 March 1985 | |
| John Kerr | 5 June 1890 | 17 December 1824 – 18 August 1907 |
| John Graham Kerr | 6 May 1909 | 18 September 1869 – 21 April 1957 |
| Roy Patrick Kerr | 2019-04-16 | 16 May 1934 – |
| Robert Masters Kerrison | 4 March 1841 | c. 1766 – 27 April 1847 |
| Richard Kerswell | 2012-04-19 | |
| Abel Ketelbey | 25 February 1720 | c. 1676 – 5 December 1744 |
| Robert Johnston Ketelbey | 12 May 1726 | 30 June 1743 |
| Edgar Hartley Kettle | 7 May 1936 | 20 April 1882 – 1 December 1936 |
| Eric Barrington Keverne | 15 May 1997 | |
| Astley Cooper Key | 4 June 1868 | 18 January 1821 – 3 March 1888 |
| Thomas Hewitt Key | 7 June 1860 | 20 March 1799 – 29 November 1875 |
| Richard Darwin Keynes | 19 March 1959 | 14 August 1919 – 12 June 2010 Physiologist, Cambridge |
| Johann Georg Keyssler | 5 February 1719 | 13 April 1693 – 21 June 1743 |
| Chandrashekhar Bhalchandra Khare | 2012-04-19 | |
| Subhash Khot | 2017-05-05 | |
| Gurdev Singh Khush | 9 March 1995 | |
| Thomas Walter Bannerman Kibble | 20 March 1980 | |
| John Kidby | 3 June 1756 | c. 1696 – 2 July 1762 |
| Franklin Kidd | 16 March 1944 | 12 October 1890 – 7 May 1974 Biochemist |
| John Kidd | 28 March 1822 | 10 September 1775 – 17 September 1851 |
| Robert Kidston | 5 June 1902 | 29 June 1852 – 13 July 1924 |
| Francis Kiernan | 18 December 1834 | 2 October 1800 – 31 December 1874 |
| Tom Kilburn | 18 March 1965 | 11 August 1921 – 17 January 2001 |
| John Vincent Kilmartin | 9 May 2002 | |
| Peter Kinck | 16 October 1729 | fl 1729–1754 |
| Andrew King | 20 May 1663 | ? March 1678 Original, Merchant |
| Andrew King | 2018-05-09 | 8 April 1959 – |
| David Anthony King | 14 March 1991 | |
| Edmond King | 18 July 1666 | 1629 – 30 May 1709 Physician |
| Edward King | 14 May 1767 | 1735 – 16 April 1807 |
| Frederick Ernest King | 18 March 1954 | 2 May 1905 – 14 August 1999 Professor of Chemistry, Nottingham Univ. |
| George King | 9 June 1887 | 12 April 1840 – 12 February 1909 Fellow |
| Harold King | 11 May 1933 | 25 February 1887 – 20 February 1956 Chemist, Nat.Inst. for Med.Research, Hampstead |
| James King | 1 March 1781 | 1750 – October 1784 |
| John King | 30 November 1676 | ? June 1648 – Rhetoric Professor, Gresham College |
| John Glen King | 21 February 1771 | 1732 – 3 November 1787 Clergyman |
| John King, 2nd Baron King of Ockham | 9 January 1735 | ? January 1706 – 10 February 1740 |
| Julia King, Baroness Brown of Cambridge | 2017-05-05 | |
| Louis Vessot King | 15 May 1924 | 18 April 1886 – 6 June 1956 Professor of Physics, McGill University |
| Peter King, 1st Baron King of Ockham | 14 November 1728 | 1669 – 22 July 1734 |
| Phillip Parker King | 26 February 1824 | 13 December 1793 – 26 February 1856 |
| William King | 30 November 1705 | 1 May 1650 – 8 May 1729 |
| William Bernard Robinson King | 17 March 1949 | 12 November 1889 – 23 January 1963 |
| Desmond George King-Hele | 17 March 1966 | |
| William King, Earl of Lovelace and Viscount Ockham | 25 November 1841 | 21 February 1805 – 29 December 1893 |
| John Frank Charles Kingman | 18 March 1971 | |
| John Kingston | 25 April 1816 | fl 1816 |
| Anthony James Kinloch | 17 May 2007 | |
| George Kinnaird, 7th Lord Kinnaird | 19 February 1784 | 1745 – 11 October 1805 |
| Dimitris Kioussis | 15 May 2009 | |
| Philip Joseph Kinski | 18 November 1731 | 28 November 1700 – 12 January 1749 |
| Frederic Stanley Kipping | 3 June 1897 | 16 August 1863 – 1 May 1949 |
| Andrew Kippis | 17 June 1779 | 28 March 1726 – 8 October 1795 |
| Anthony John Kirby | 19 March 1987 | |
| Joshua Kirby | 26 March 1767 | 1716 – 20 June 1774 |
| William Kirby | 5 March 1818 | 19 September 1759 – 4 July 1850 |
| Christfried Kirch | 16 December 1742 | 24 December 1694 – 9 March 1740 |
| John Kirk | 9 June 1887 | 19 December 1832 – 15 January 1922 |
| Thomas Kirke | 30 November 1693 | 22 December 1650 – 24 April 1706 |
| Thomas Penyngton Kirkman | 11 June 1857 | 31 March 1806 – 3 February 1895 |
| Frances Clare Kirwan | 10 May 2001 | |
| Richard Kirwan | 24 February 1780 | 1733 – 1 June 1812 |
| Mark Kisin | 16 May 2008 | |
| Finlay Lorimer Kitchin | 10 May 1928 | 13 December 1870 – 20 January 1934 |
| John Alwyne Kitching | 24 March 1960 | 24 October 1908 – 1 April 1996 |
| Martin Heinrich Klaproth | 16 April 1795 | 1 December 1743 – 1 January 1817 |
| Alfred Alexander Peter Kleczkowski | 15 March 1962 | 4 December 1908 – 27 November 1970 |
| Edward Emanuel Klein | 3 June 1875 | 32 October 1844 – 9 February 1925 |
| Jacobus Theodorus Klein | 6 March 1729 | 16 August 1685 – 27 February 1759 |
| Michael Lawrence Klein | 15 May 2003 | |
| David Klenerman | 2012-04-19 | |
| Samuel Klingenstierna | 23 April 1730 | August 1698 – ? November 1765 |
| Aaron Klug | 20 March 1969 | chemist, Nobel Prize (1982), President of Royal Society (1995–2000) |
| Edward Knatchbull | 6 May 1802 | 20 December 1781 – 24 May 1849 |
| James Lewis Knight-Bruce | 18 March 1830 | 16 February 1791 – 7 November 1866 |
| Gowin Knight | 25 April 1745 | ? September 1713 – 8 June 1772 |
| Henry Gally Knight | 20 May 1841 | 2 December 1786 – 9 February 1846 |
| John Knight | 4 December 1706 | c. 1687 – 2 October 1733 |
| Jonathan Cave Knight | 2019-04-16 | 17 June 1964 – |
| Ralph Knight | 28 May 1741 | fl 1741 |
| Peter Leonard Knight | 13 May 1999 | |
| Thomas Andrew Knight | 21 March 1805 | 12 August 1759 – 11 May 1838 |
| Cargill Gilston Knott | 13 May 1920 | 30 June 1856 – 26 October 1922 |
| John Frederick Knott | 15 March 1990 | |
| Jeremy Randall Knowles | 17 March 1977 | |
| John Knowles | 5 July 1821 | 1781 – 21 July 1841 |
| Francis Charles Knowles | 4 March 1830 | 10 June 1802 – 19 March 1892 |
| Francis Gerald William Knowles | 17 March 1966 | 9 March 1915 – 13 July 1974 |
| George Knox | 25 February 1802 | 14 January 1765 – 13 June 1827 |
| John Henderson Knox | 15 March 1984 | |
| Philip Joseph Kocienski | 15 May 1997 | |
| Egon Hynek Kodicek | 15 March 1973 | 3 August 1908 – 27 July 1982 |
| Ralph Kohn | 18 May 2006 | Honorary |
| Samuel Koleseri | 16 October 1729 | 18 November 1663 – 24 December 1732 |
| John Komarzewski | 10 May 1792 | c. 1744–1810 |
| George Armand Robert Kon | 18 March 1943 | 19 February 1892 – 15 March 1951 Fellow 18 March 1943 |
| Charles Dietrich Eberhard Konig | 18 January 1810 | 1774 – 6 September 1851 |
| Hans Leo Kornberg | 18 March 1965 | |
| Hans Walter Kosterlitz | 16 March 1978 | 27 April 1903 – 26 October 1996, biochemist, Nobel Prize (1953) |
| Tony Kouzarides | 2012-04-19 | |
| Hans Adolf Krebs | 20 March 1947 | 25 August 1900 – 22 November 1981 |
| John Richard Krebs | 15 March 1984 | |
| Von Kreienberg | 11 June 1713 | ? 1743 |
| Georg Kreisel | 17 March 1966 | |
| David Krieg | 11 January 1699 | 1669 – 23 July 1710 Physician |
| Kariamanickam Srinivasa Krishnan | 14 March 1940 | 4 December 1898 – 14 June 1961 |
| Ondrej Krivanek | 2010-05-20 | |
| Peter Leslie Krohn | 21 March 1963 | |
| Hans Kronberger | 18 March 1965 | 28 July 1920 – 29 September 1970, nuclear physicist |
| Peter Benedict Kronheimer | 15 May 1997 | |
| Harold Walter Kroto | 15 March 1990 | chemist, Nobel Prize (1996) |
| Dietrich Kuchemann | 21 March 1963 | 12 September 1911 – 23 February 1976 |
| Tesser Samuel Kuckahn | 4 June 1772 | fl 1772 |
| Heinrich Gerhard Kuhn | 18 March 1954 | 10 March 1904 – 26 August 1994 |
| Dimitri Kullmann | 2018-05-09 | 1958 |
| Shrinivas R. Kulkarni | 10 May 2001 | astronomer |
| Eugenia Kumacheva | 2016-04-29 | |
| Nicholas Kurti | 15 March 1956 | 14 May 1908 – 24 November 1998, physicist, vice-president of Royal Society (1965–67) |
| Henricus Gerardus Jacobus Maria Kuypers | 17 March 1988 | 9 September 1925 – 26 September 1989 Neuroscientist, Cambridge University |
| Dominic Kwiatkowski | 2018-05-09 | |
| Marta Zofia Kwiatkowska | 2019-04-16 | 1957 |
| Alexander Kyd | 16 March 1820 | c. 1754 – 25 November 1826 Lieutenant-General |

=== L ===
| Names | Election date | Notes |
|---|---|---|
| Thomas Howell Laby | 7 May 1931 | 3 May 1880 – 21 June 1946 |
| Nicolas Louis de Lacaille | 17 January 1760 | ? 15 May 1713 – 21 March 1762 |
| Peter Julius Lachmann | 18 March 1982 | |
| David Lambert Lack | 15 March 1951 | 16 July 1910 – 12 March 1973 |
| Thomas Fantet de Lagny | 1 December 1718 | 7 November 1660 – ? 12 April 1734 |
| Joseph Louis Lagrange | 5 May 1791 | 25 January 1736 – 10 April 1813 |
| Patrick Playfair Laidlaw | 12 May 1927 | 26 September 1881 – ? 20 March 1940 |
| David Laing | 23 November 1843 | 1800 – 6 August 1860 Clergyman |
| Ralph Lainson | 18 March 1982 | |
| Thomas Lake | 14 February 1667 | fl 1657–1711 |
| Devendra Lal | 15 March 1979 | |
| Joseph Jerome le François de Lalande | 24 November 1763 | 11 July 1732 – 4 April 1807 |
| Christopher John Lamb | 16 May 2008 | |
| Horace Lamb | 12 June 1884 | ? 27 November 1849 – 4 December 1934 |
| Trevor David Lamb | 11 March 1993 | |
| William Lamb, 2nd Viscount Melbourne | 25 February 1841 | 15 March 1779 – 24 November 1848 |
| Robert Lambe | 6 April 1758 | 3 November 1769 |
| Kurt Lambeck | 10 March 1994 | |
| Aylmer Bourke Lambert | 31 March 1791 | 3 February 1761 – 10 January 1842 |
| William Lambton | 9 January 1817 | 1756 – 26 January 1823 |
| Angus Iain Lamond | 20 May 2010 | Molecular biologist |
| Charles Lamotte | 22 June 1727 | 25 February 1742 |
| George William Lamplugh | 11 May 1905 | 8 April 1859 – 9 October 1926 |
| Frederick William Lanchester | 11 May 1922 | ? 23 October 1868 – 8 March 1946 |
| Giovanni Maria Lancisi | 20 November 1706 | 26 October 1654 – 20 January 1720 |
| Michael Francis Land | 18 March 1982 | neurobiologist |
| Russell Lande | 19 April 2012 | |
| John Landen | 16 January 1766 | 23 January 1719 – 15 January 1790 |
| Anthony Milner Lane | 20 March 1975 | 27 July 1928 – 9 February 2011 |
| David Philip Lane | 14 March 1996 | |
| George Lane, 1st Viscount Lanesborough | 19 February 1662 | c. 1621 – 11 December 1683 |
| Joseph Lane | 31 January 1678 | June 1728 Barrister |
| Ralph Lane | 30 November 1692 | 1732 Turkey merchant |
| Timothy Lane | 11 January 1770 | June 1734 – 5 July 1807 Apothecary |
| Benjamin Laney | 14 November 1666 | 1591 – 24 January 1675 |
| Andrew Richard Lang | 20 March 1975 | 9 February 1924 – 30 June 2008 |
| William Dickson Lang | 2 May 1929 | 29 December 1878 – 7 March 1966 |
| William Henry Lang | 4 May 1911 | 12 May 1874 – 29 August 1960 |
| Jane Alison Langdale | 2015-05-01 | 1960 – Botanist |
| John de Lange | 11 March 1736 | 7 July 1755 |
| William Langford | 17 March 1796 | fl 1796 Master, Eton School |
| James Langham | 17 January 1678 | c. 1620 – 22 August 1699 |
| Robert Phelan Langlands | 19 March 1981 | |
| John Newport Langley | 7 June 1883 | 2 November 1852 – 5 November 1925 |
| Browne Langrish | 16 May 1734 | 29 November 1759 |
| Edwin Lankester | 18 December 1845 | 23 April 1814 – 30 October 1874 |
| Edwin Ray Lankester | 3 June 1875 | 15 May 1847 – 15 August 1929 |
| Jacob Frederick Lantsheer | 13 May 1756 | fl 1756 |
| Edward Lany | 30 November 1692 | c. 1667 – 9 August 1728 |
| Pierre Simon Laplace | 30 April 1789 | 28 March 1749 – 5 March 1827 |
| Michael Franz Lappert | 15 March 1979 | 21 December 1928 – 28 March 2014 Chemist |
| Arthur Lapworth | 5 May 1910 | 10 October 1872 – 5 April 1941 |
| Charles Lapworth | 7 June 1888 | ? 20 September 1842 – 13 March 1920 |
| Thomas Aiskew Larcom | 16 May 1844 | 22 April 1801 – 15 June 1879 Cartographer & civil servant |
| Dionysius Lardner | 28 February 1828 | 3 April 1793 – 29 April 1859 |
| William Larkins | 14 April 1796 | 24 April 1800 |
| Joseph Larmor | 2 June 1892 | 11 July 1857 – 19 May 1942 |
| Stephen Richard Larter | 15 May 2009 | |
| Thomas Lashley | 24 November 1768 | 1807 |
| Ronald Alfred Laskey | 15 March 1984 | |
| William Lassell | 7 June 1849 | 18 June 1799 – 5 October 1880 |
| John Latham | 25 May 1775 | 27 June 1740 – 4 February 1837 |
| John Latham | 30 April 1801 | 29 December 1761 – 20 April 1843 physician |
| Robert Gordon Latham | 9 June 1848 | 24 March 1812 – 9 March 1888 |
| William Latham | 10 November 1796 | 7 February 1807 Antiquarian |
| John Lauder | 24 December 1772 | fl 1772 |
| Simon Barry Laughlin | 11 May 2000 | |
| Anthony Seymour Laughton | 20 March 1980 | |
| Brian Edward Launder | 10 March 1994 | |
| Steffen Lilholt Lauritzen | 19 May 2011 | |
| Jean Rodolphe Lavater | 30 November 1708 | fl 1704–1716 |
| William Graeme Laver | 19 March 1987 | |
| Antoine Laurent Lavoisier | 3 April 1788 | ? August 1743 – 8 May 1794 |
| George Henry Law | 24 February 1814 | 12 September 1761 – 22 September 1845 |
| John Law | 20 March 1783 | 1745 – 18 March 1810 |
| John Bennet Lawes | 1 June 1854 | 28 December 1814 – 31 August 1900 |
| Peter Anthony Lawrence | 17 March 1983 | |
| Edward Lawrence | 30 November 1708 | 1725 Customs collector, Gentleman Usher |
| John Lawrence | 27 November 1673 | 26 January 1692 Merchant & Lord Mayor of London |
| Thomas Lawrence | 28 February 1822 | 4 May 1769 – 7 January 1830 |
| William Lawrence | 11 November 1813 | 16 July 1783 – 5 July 1867 |
| Peter John Lawrenson | 18 March 1982 | |
| John Lawry | 17 June 1742 | c. 1716 – ? 28 August 1773 Clergyman |
| Richard Maitland Laws | 20 March 1980 | |
| Henry Lawson | 21 May 1840 | 23 March 1774 – 22 August 1855 Astronomer & Meteorologist |
| James Lawson | 12 March 1812 | 9 April 1818 Chief engineer of the Mint |
| John David Lawson | 17 March 1983 | |
| Wilfrid Lawson | 11 December 1718 | 1697 – 13 July 1737 |
| John Hartley Lawton | 16 March 1989 | |
| William Lax | 5 May 1796 | 1761 – 29 October 1836 |
| Charles Peter Layard | 26 March 1778 | 1749 – 10 April 1803 Dean of Bristol |
| Daniel Peter Layard | 22 January 1747 | 1721–1802 |
| Mike Lazaridis | 30 April 2014 | |
| Corinne Le Quéré | 2016-04-29 | |
| Arthur Sheridan Lea | 5 June 1890 | 1 December 1853 – 23 March 1915 |
| Sydney Leach | 11 March 1993 | |
| William Elford Leach | 15 February 1816 | 2 February 1791 – 25 August 1836 |
| Peter Francis Leadlay | 11 May 2000 | |
| William Martin Leake | 13 April 1815 | 14 January 1777 – 6 January 1860 |
| Richard Leakey | 17 May 2007 | 19 December 1944 – 2 January 2022 |
| John Beresford Leathes | 4 May 1911 | 5 November 1864 – 14 September 1956 |
| Christopher John Leaver | 20 March 1986 | |
| Charles Philippe Leblond | 18 March 1965 | 6 February 1910 – 10 April 2007 |
| Georges-Louis Leclerc, Comte de Buffon | 7 February 1740 | 7 September 1707 – 16 April 1788 |
| Thomas Lediard | 9 December 1742 | 1685 – June 1743 |
| John Charles Grant Ledingham | 12 May 1921 | 19 May 1875 – 4 October 1944 |
| Anthony Ledwith | 9 March 1995 | 14 August 1933 – 5 January 2015 Chemist |
| Arthur Lee | 29 May 1766 | 21 December 1740 – 12 December 1792 |
| Charles Dillon Lee, 12th Viscount Dillon of Costello-Gallen | 28 May 1767 | 1745 – 9 November 1813 |
| James Prince Lee | 21 June 1849 | 28 July 1804 – 24 December 1869 |
| John Lee | 15 February 1781 | 6 July 1822 Physician |
| John Lee | 24 February 1831 | 28 April 1783 – 25 February 1866 Antiquary |
| Robert Lee | 25 March 1830 | 1793 – 6 February 1877 |
| Stephen Lee | 19 April 1798 | 1835 Astronomer |
| William Lee | 26 May 1748 | fl 1748 Son of Lord Chief Justice William Lee |
| Anthony David Lees | 21 March 1968 | 27 February 1917 – 3 October 1992 |
| Charles Herbert Lees | 3 May 1906 | 28 July 1864 – 25 September 1952 |
| George Martin Lees | 18 March 1948 | 16 April 1898 – 25 January 1955 |
| Henry Beaumont Leeson | 7 June 1849 | 1800 – 8 November 1872 |
| Antoni van Leeuwenhoek | 29 January 1680 | 24 October 1632 – 26 August 1723 |
| Charles Shaw Lefevre | 10 November 1796 | 27 April 1823 |
| John Henry Lefroy | 9 June 1848 | 28 January 1817 – 11 April 1890 |
| Edward Legge | 26 February 1736 | 1710 – 19 September 1747 |
| George Legge, 3rd Earl of Dartmouth | 3 May 1781 | 3 October 1755 – 1 November 1810 |
| William Legge, 2nd Earl of Dartmouth | 7 November 1754 | 20 June 1731 – 15 July 1801 |
| William Legge, 4th Earl of Dartmouth | 7 November 1822 | 29 November 1784 – 22 November 1853 |
| Anthony James Leggett | 20 March 1980 | |
| Thomas Legh | 12 June 1817 | 1793 – 8 May 1857 |
| Anthony Charles Legon | 11 May 2000 | |
| Alan Robert Lehmann | 20 May 2010 | |
| Hermann Lehmann | 16 March 1972 | 8 July 1910 – 13 July 1985 |
| Gottfried Wilhelm Leibniz | 9 April 1673 | ? 21 June 1646 – 14 November 1716 |
| Ralph Leicester | 7 May 1724 | c. 1699–1777 |
| Charles Leigh | 13 May 1685 | 1662 – ? 1717 Physician |
| David Alan Leigh | 15 May 2009 | |
| Ellis Leighton | 9 December 1663 | 9 January 1685 |
| Timothy Leighton | 30 April 2014 | Professor of Ultrasonics, Southampton University |
| Robert Thomson Leiper | 3 May 1923 | 17 April 1881 – 21 May 1969 Parasitologist, London |
| Sir William Boog Leishman | 5 May 1910 | 6 November 1865 – 2 June 1926 |
| Theodore Forbes Leith | 20 December 1781 | 1746 – 6 September 1819 |
| Max Rudolf Lemberg | 20 March 1952 | 19 October 1896 – 10 April 1975 |
| Raymond Urgel Lemieux | 16 March 1967 | 16 June 1920 – 22 July 2000 |
| Mark A. Lemmon | 2016-04-29 | Pharmacologist |
| Charles Lemon | 23 May 1822 | 30 September 1784 – 13 February 1868 |
| John Edward Lennard-Jones | 11 May 1933 | 27 October 1894 – 1 November 1954 |
| Dacre Barret Lennard | 30 November 1705 | 1733 |
| Charles Lennox, 2nd Duke of Richmond, Lennox and Aubigny | 6 February 1724 | 18 May 1701 – 8 August 1750 |
| Charles Lennox, 3rd Duke of Richmond and Lennox | 11 December 1755 | 23 February 1735 – 29 December 1806 |
| Gerald Ponsonby Lenox-Conyngham | 2 May 1918 | 21 August 1866 – 27 October 1956 |
| Leopold I, King of the Belgians | 30 November 1816 | ? 18 December 1790 – 10 December 1865 Royal |
| Leopold II, Grand Duke of Tuscany | 24 May 1838 | 3 October 1797 – 29 January 1870 |
| Johann Friedrich Leopold | 4 May 1709 | 3 February 1676 – 4 May 1711 |
| Antonio Leprotti | 16 May 1734 | c. 1684–1747 |
| Andrew Greig William Leslie | 10 May 2001 | |
| Frank Matthews Leslie | 9 March 1995 | 8 March 1935 – 15 June 2000 Prof. of Mathematics, Strathclyde Univ. |
| John Leslie | 22 January 1807 | 20 November 1759 – November 1824 Soldier, aka John Curning |
| Patrick Duguid Leslie | 8 November 1781 | 1783 Physician |
| John Letch | 20 March 1766 | 17 September 1781 |
| Smart Lethieullier | 12 March 1724 | 3 November 1701 – 27 August 1760 |
| Gregorio Leti | 30 November 1681 | 29 May 1630 – 9 June 1701 |
| John Coakley Lettsom | 18 November 1773 | 22 November 1744 – 1 November 1815 |
| James Lever | 10 February 1743 | 25 January 1749 |
| Ashton Lever | 18 February 1773 | 5 March 1729 – 24 January 1788 |
| John Leveret | 11 March 1714 | 25 August 1662 – 3 May 1724 President of Harvard College, Mass. |
| George Granville William Sutherland Leveson-Gower, 3rd Duke of Sutherland | 24 November 1870 | 19 December 1828 – 22 September 1892 |
| Granville George Leveson-Gower, 2nd Earl Granville | 13 January 1853 | 11 May 1815 – 31 March 1891 |
| William Russell Levick | 18 March 1982 | |
| Malcolm Harris Levitt | 17 May 2007 | |
| Michael Levitt | 10 May 2001 | biophysicist, computational biology |
| John Lewin | 20 June 1765 | 1770 |
| Dan Lewis | 17 March 1955 | Plant geneticist, John Innes Inst. |
| George Lewis | 13 June 1754 | fl 1754 |
| Jack Lewis, Baron Lewis of Newnham | 15 March 1973 | 13 February 1928 – 17 July 2014 |
| Julian Hart Lewis | 19 April 2012 | 12 August 1946 – 30 April 2014 |
| Thomas Lewis | 2 May 1918 | 26 December 1881 – 17 March 1945 |
| Thomas Frankland Lewis | 8 June 1820 | 14 May 1780 – 22 January 1855 |
| Thomas Locke Lewis | 5 May 1836 | 17 November 1852 |
| Wilfrid Bennett Lewis | 22 March 1945 | 24 June 1908 – 10 January 1987 |
| William Lewis | 31 October 1745 | ? June 1708 – 21 January 1781 |
| William Cudmore McCullagh Lewis | 6 May 1926 | 30 June 1885 – 11 February 1956 Prof Physical Chem, Liverpool Univ |
| William James Lewis | 6 May 1909 | 16 January 1847 – 16 April 1926 |
| Steven Victor Ley | 15 March 1990 | |
| Thomas Leybourn | 2 April 1835 | 9 April 1770 – 1 March 1840 |
| Johann Borkman Leyonbergh | 21 November 1667 | ? February 1625 – August 1691 |
| Christian Leyoncrona | 1 December 1701 | c. 1662 – 8 April 1710 |
| Ottoline Leyser | 17 May 2007 | |
| Edward Lhuyd | 30 November 1708 | 1660 – 30 June 1709 |
| Georg Christoph Lichtenberg | 11 April 1793 | ? 1 July 1744 – 24 |
| Edward George Tandy Liddell | 16 March 1939 | 25 March 1895 – 17 August 1981 |
| John Liddell | 18 June 1846 | 1794 – 28 May 1868 Royal Navy surgeon |
| Johann Nathaniel Lieberkuhn | 18 December 1740 | 5 September 1711 – 7 December 1756 |
| Johann Georg Liebknecht | 5 December 1728 | ? 23 April 1679 – 17 September 1749 |
| Joseph Lieutaud | 21 June 1739 | 21 June 1703 – ? 11 December 1780 |
| Eddie Liew | 19 April 2013 | |
| Graham Collingwood Liggins | 20 March 1980 | 24 June 1926 – 24 August 2010 Prof of Obstetrics, Auckland |
| John Lightfoot | 8 March 1781 | 10 December 1735 – 20 February 1788 |
| Michael James Lighthill | 19 March 1953 | 23 January 1924 – 17 July 1998 |
| Stafford Lightman | 2017-05-05 | |
| John Ligonier, 1st Earl Ligonier | 26 October 1749 | 7 November 1680 – 28 April 1770 |
| John Lihou | 6 June 1833 | 25 May 1792 – 13 July 1840 |
| David Malcolm James Lilley | 9 May 2002 | |
| Malcolm Douglas Lilly | 14 March 1991 | 9 August 1936 – 18 May 1998 |
| Simon Lilly | 30 April 2014 | Astronomist, ETH Zürich |
| John Philip de Limbourg | 30 May 1771 | 1726 – 1 February 1811 |
| Johann Heinrich Linck | 11 December 1718 | 17 December 1674 – 29 October 1734 |
| James Lind | 18 December 1777 | 17 May 1736 – 17 October 1812 Physician |
| John Lind | 25 November 1773 | 13 August 1737 – 12 January 1781 |
| Linda | 30 November 1711 | fl 1711 |
| Tomas Robert Lindahl | 17 March 1988 | |
| Frederick Alexander Lindemann, Viscount Cherwell | 13 May 1920 | 5 April 1886 – 3 July 1957 |
| Paul Fredrick Linden | 17 May 2007 | |
| John Lindley | 17 January 1828 | 5 February 1799 – 1 November 1865 |
| Nathaniel Lindley, Baron Lindley | 20 January 1898 | 29 November 1828 – 9 December 1921 |
| David Alexander Edward Lindsay, 27th Earl of Crawford and 10th Earl of Balcarres | 6 November 1924 | 11 October 1871 – 8 March 1940 Statute |
| James Ludovic Lindsay, 26th Earl of Crawford and 9th Earl of Balcarres | 6 June 1878 | 28 July 1847 – 31 January 1913 |
| John Lindsay, 20th Earl of Crawford | 15 June 1732 | 4 October 1702 – 20 September 1749 |
| Heinrich Friedrich Link | 5 May 1842 | 3 February 1767 – 1 January 1851 |
| Carl Linnaeus | 3 May 1753 | ? 24 May 1707 – 10 January 1778 |
| Anthony William Linnane | 20 March 1980 | |
| John Wilfrid Linnett | 17 March 1955 | 3 August 1913 – 7 November 1975 |
| Reginald Patrick Linstead | 14 March 1940 | 28 August 1902 – 22 September 1966 |
| Hugues Louis De Lionne | 28 June 1665 | fl 1665 |
| Henry Solomon Lipson | 21 March 1957 | 11 March 1910 – 26 April 1991 |
| John Liptrap | 4 March 1802 | fl 1802 |
| Joseph-Nicolas Delisle | 12 March 1724 | 4 April 1688 – ? 11 July 1768 |
| Samuel Lisle | 17 June 1742 | 1683 – 3 October 1749 |
| Thomas Lisle | 5 May 1757 | 31 March 1767 Clergyman, Hampshire |
| Peter Simon Liss | 16 May 2008 | |
| Hans Werner Lissmann | 18 March 1954 | 30 April 1909 – 21 April 1995 |
| Arthur Lister | 9 June 1898 | 17 April 1830 – 19 July 1908 |
| Joseph Jackson Lister | 14 June 1900 | 3 August 1857 – 5 February 1927 Zoologist |
| Joseph Jackson Lister | 2 February 1832 | 11 January 1786 – 24 October 1869 |
| Joseph Lister, 1st Baron Lister of Lyme Regis | 7 June 1860 | 6 April 1827 – 10 February 1912 |
| Martin Lister | 2 November 1671 | 12 April 1639 – 2 February 1712 |
| Robert Liston | 13 May 1841 | 28 October 1794 – 7 December 1847 |
| Albert Edward Litherland | 21 March 1974 | |
| Edmond Littlehales | 30 November 1717 | c. 1690 – 24 September 1724 |
| Edward John Littleton, 1st Baron Hatherton | 15 February 1855 | 18 March 1791 – 4 May 1863 |
| John Edensor Littlewood | 11 May 1916 | 9 June 1885 – 6 September 1977 |
| Peter Brent Littlewood | 17 May 2007 | Head of Cavendish Laboratory |
| George Downing Liveing | 12 June 1879 | 21 December 1827 – 26 December 1924 |
| Archibald Liversidge | 8 June 1882 | 17 November 1847 – 26 September 1927 |
| David Livingstone | 3 June 1858 | 19 March 1813 – 1 May 1873 |
| Peter Livius | 29 April 1773 | 1727 – 23 July 1795 |
| John Dillwyn Llewelyn | 4 February 1836 | 12 January 1810 – 24 August 1882 |
| Charles Lloyd | 8 March 1764 | 1735 – 22 January 1773 secretary & antiquarian |
| David Graham Lloyd | 12 March 1992 | 20 June 1937 – 30 May 2006 NZ botanist |
| Edward Lloyd | 12 March 1818 | 29 April 1855 Rear-admiral |
| George Lloyd | 10 February 1737 | c. 1708 – 4 December 1783 |
| Humphrey Lloyd | 21 January 1836 | 16 April 1800 – 17 January 1881 Clergyman, optics & magnetism |
| John Lloyd | 15 December 1774 | 25 January 1750 – 24 April 1815 |
| John Lloyd | 8 November 1759 | c. 1735 – 8 June 1777 |
| John Augustus Lloyd | 11 March 1830 | 1 May 1800 – 10 October 1854 |
| Owen Lloyd | 1 December 1701 | c. 1674–1738 Clergyman |
| Philemon Lloyd | 9 November 1727 | fl 1727–1735 |
| Robert Glanville Lloyd | 11 May 2000 | |
| William Forster Lloyd | 10 April 1834 | 1794 – 2 June 1852 |
| Guy Charles Lloyd-Jones | 3 May 2013 | |
| Yuk Ming Dennis Lo | 19 May 2011 | |
| Theophilus Lobb | 6 March 1729 | 17 August 1678 – 19 May 1763 |
| Ferdinand Philip Lobkowitz | 2 July 1747 | 1724–1784 |
| John Lock | 4 February 1742 | 1767 |
| William Lock | 7 February 1754 | c. 1687 – 21 October 1761 MP for Grimsby |
| John Locke | 26 November 1668 | 29 August 1632 – 28 October 1704 |
| Joseph Locke | 22 February 1838 | 9 August 1805 – 18 September 1860 |
| Edward Hawke Locker | 5 December 1811 | 9 October 1777 – 16 October 1849 |
| John Lockman | 25 June 1778 | c. 1721 – 27 December 1807 |
| Ben Lockspeiser | 17 March 1949 | 9 March 1891 – 18 October 1990 |
| Michael Lockwood | 18 May 2006 | Physicist, Reading Univ. |
| Charles Lockyer | 15 May 1740 | 13 April 1752 |
| Joseph Norman Lockyer | 3 June 1869 | 17 May 1836 – 16 August 1920 |
| Jean Marie François du Parc Locmaria | 12 January 1744 | c. 1708 – 2 October 1745 |
| Charles Locock | 2 June 1864 | 21 April 1799 – 23 July 1875 |
| David Lodge | 2016-04-29 | Physiologist |
| Oliver Joseph Lodge | 9 June 1887 | 12 June 1851 – 22 August 1940 |
| Francis Lodwick | 30 November 1681 | ? August 1619 – 5 January 1694 |
| William Edmond Logan | 5 June 1851 | 20 April 1798 – ? 22 June 1875 |
| Heinz London | 16 March 1961 | 7 November 1907 – 3 August 1970 |
| Charles Long, 1st Baron Farnborough | 2 February 1792 | 1761 – 17 January 1838 |
| Roger Long | 8 May 1729 | 3 February 1680 – 16 December 1770 |
| James Long | 20 May 1663 | ? 1617 – 22 January 1692 Original |
| Walter Hume Long, 1st Viscount Long of Wraxall | 19 June 1902 | 13 July 1854 – 26 September 1924 |
| William Long | 16 April 1801 | 1818 |
| Malcolm Sim Longair | 27 May 2004 | |
| Hugh Christopher Longuet-Higgins | 20 March 1958 | 11 April 1923 – 27 March 2004 |
| Michael Selwyn Longuet-Higgins | 21 March 1963 | 8 December 1925 - 26 February 2016 |
| Kathleen Yardley Lonsdale | 22 March 1945 | 28 January 1903 – 1 April 1971 |
| Gilbert George Lonzarich | 16 March 1989 | |
| Antonio Maria Lorgna | 3 April 1788 | 1730 – 28 June 1796 |
| George Huntly Lorimer | 20 March 1986 | |
| Michael Lort | 15 May 1766 | 1725 – 5 November 1790 |
| John Gideon Loten | 27 November 1760 | 16 May 1710 – 25 February 1789 |
| Rodney Loudon | 19 March 1987 | |
| Archduke Louis of Austria | 8 February 1816 | 13 December 1784 – 21 December 1864 Royal |
| John Freeman Loutit | 21 March 1963 | 20 February 1910 – 11 June 1992, medical researcher, radiobiologist |
| Augustus Edward Hough Love | 7 June 1894 | 17 April 1863 – 5 June 1940 |
| Edward Loveden Loveden | 14 November 1805 | 1751 – 4 January 1822 |
| Robin Howard Lovell-Badge | 10 May 2001 | |
| Alfred Charles Bernard Lovell | 17 March 1955 | 31 August 1913 – 6 August 2012 |
| James Ephraim Lovelock | 21 March 1974 | |
| Martin Geoffrey Low | 14 March 1996 | |
| Edward Joseph Lowe | 6 June 1867 | 11 November 1825 – 10 March 1900 |
| George Lowe | 18 December 1834 | 1788 – 25 December 1868 Gas Engineer |
| Gordon Lowe | 15 March 1984 | 31 May 1933 – 6 August 2003 Organic Chemist |
| Jan Löwe | 16 May 2008 | |
| Robert Lowe, Viscount Sherbrooke | 25 May 1871 | 4 December 1811 – 27 July 1892 |
| Otto Egon Lowenstein | 17 March 1955 | 24 October 1906 – 31 January 1999 zoologist, Birmingham University |
| Richard Lower | 17 October 1667 | 1631 – 17 January 1691 |
| Ralph Lowndes | 15 July 1696 | 29 October 1662 – 31 August 1727 |
| Thomas Martin Lowry | 7 May 1914 | 26 October 1874 – 2 November 1936 |
| Wilson Lowry | 5 March 1812 | 24 January 1762 – 23 June 1824 |
| Robert Lowth | 21 November 1765 | 27 November 1710 – 3 November 1787 Bishop of London |
| Anthony Lowther | 20 May 1663 | ? May 1641 – 27 January 1693 Original |
| Henry Lowther, 3rd Viscount Lonsdale | 21 January 1742 | 1694 – 12 March 1751 |
| John Lowther, 1st Viscount Lonsdale | 20 December 1699 | 25 April 1655 – 10 July 1700 |
| James Lowther | 25 November 1736 | 5 August 1673 – 2 January 1755 |
| Sir John Lowther, 2nd Baronet | 27 January 1664 | ? November 1642 – ? January 1706 |
| William Lowther, 2nd Earl of Lonsdale | 5 July 1810 | 21 July 1787 – 4 March 1872 |
| John Lowthorp | 30 November 1702 | c. 1659 – 2 September 1724 |
| John Lubbock, 1st Baron Avebury | 3 June 1858 | 30 April 1834 – 28 May 1913 |
| Sir John William Lubbock, 2nd Baronet | 15 November 1821 | 26 August 1774 – 22 October 1840 |
| Sir John William Lubbock, 3rd Baronet | 15 January 1829 | 26 March 1803 – 20 June 1865 |
| Jean-André Deluc | 10 June 1773 | 9 February 1727 – 7 November 1817 Geologist, meteorologist |
| Cyril Edward Lucas | 17 March 1966 | 30 July 1909 – 12 January 2002 |
| John Lucas, 1st Baron Lucas of Shenfield | 20 May 1663 | ? October 1606 – 2 July 1671 Original |
| Keith Lucas | 1 May 1913 | 8 March 1879 – 5 October 1916 |
| Richard Lucas | 15 March 1722 | c. 1693 – ? October 1747 Rector, Foots Cray, Kent |
| Sir Berkeley Lucy, 3rd Baronet | 23 March 1698 | c. 1672 – 19 November 1759 |
| Sir Kingsmill Lucy, 2nd Baronet | 26 November 1668 | c. 1649 – 19 September 1678 |
| Ludlow | 30 November 1702 | fl 1702 |
| Carlo Maria Luigi, Count of Barbiano and Belgiojoso | 3 May 1781 | 2 January 1728 – 1801 |
| James Luke | 7 June 1855 | ? 1798 – 15 August 1881 |
| Johan Luloss | 18 March 1762 | 5 August 1711 – 4 November 1768 |
| Andrew Gino Sita Lumsden | 10 March 1994 | |
| John Walter Guerrier Lund | 21 March 1963 | Phycologist |
| Raymond Douglas Lund | 12 March 1992 | |
| Francis Lunn | 11 February 1819 | 14 October 1795 – 4 August 1839 |
| Edmund Henry Lushington | 18 March 1824 | 11 July 1776 – 27 March 1839 |
| George Lusztig | 17 March 1983 | |
| Richard Lydekker | 7 June 1894 | 25 July 1849 – 16 April 1915 |
| Nicholas B Lydon | 2 May 2013 | 27 May 1957 – |
| Charles Lyell | 2 February 1826 | 14 November 1797 – 22 February 1875 |
| William Beauchamp Lygon, 2nd Earl Beauchamp | 6 December 1810 | 1782 – 12 May 1823 |
| Thomas Ranken Lyle | 2 May 1912 | 26 August 1860 – 31 March 1944 |
| Donald Lynden-Bell | 16 March 1978 | |
| Ruth Marion Lynden-Bell | 18 May 2006 | |
| Michael Richard Lynch | 30 April 2014 | |
| Andrew Geoffrey Lyne | 14 March 1996 | |
| George Francis Lyon | 15 November 1827 | 1795 – 8 October 1832 |
| Mary Frances Lyon | 15 March 1973 | |
| Pierre Lyonet | 14 January 1748 | ? 21 July 1707 – 10 January 1789 |
| Henry George Lyons | 3 May 1906 | 11 October 1864 – 10 August 1944 |
| Terence John Lyons | 9 May 2002 | |
| Daniel Lysons | 25 May 1797 | 28 April 1762 – 3 January 1834 |
| Samuel Lysons | 2 February 1797 | 17 May 1763 – 29 June 1819 |
| Basil Lythgoe | 20 March 1958 | |
| Charles Lyttelton | 27 January 1743 | 1714 – 22 December 1768 |
| George William Lyttelton, 4th Baron Lyttelton | 30 April 1840 | 31 March 1817 – 19 April 1876 |
| George Lyttelton, 1st Baron Lyttelton | 26 January 1744 | 17 January 1709 – 22 August 1773 |
| Raymond Arthur Lyttleton | 17 March 1955 | 7 May 1911 – 16 May 1995 |
| Richard Warburton Lytton | 28 May 1772 | 1745–1810 |

== Foreign members ==
=== J ===
| Name | Election date | Notes |
|---|---|---|
| François Jacob | 3 May 1973 | French biologist, Nobel Prize (1965) |
| Karl Gustav Jacob Jacobi | 6 June 1833 | 11 December 1804 – 18 February 1851 German mathematician |
| Pierre Jules César Janssen | 8 April 1875 | 23 February 1824 – 23 December 1907 |
| William Platt Jencks | 18 June 1992 | 15 August 1927 – 3 January 2007 |
| Jean Frédéric Joliot | 9 May 1946 | 19 March 1900 – 14 August 1958 |
| Marie Ennemond Camille Jordan | 26 June 1919 | 5 January 1838 – 20 January 1922 |
| Ludwig Jost | 25 June 1936 | 14 November 1865 – 22 February 1947 German botanist |
| Antoine Laurent de Jussieu | 29 January 1829 | 12 April 1748 – 17 September 1836 |

=== K ===
| Name | Election date | Notes |
|---|---|---|
| Fotis Constantine Kafatos | 15 May 2003 | |
| Thomas Kailath | 15 May 2009 | |
| Eric Kandel | 2013-05-02 | |
| Jacobus Cornelius Kapteyn | 26 June 1919 | 19 January 1851 – 18 June 1922 |
| Theodore von Kármán | 9 May 1946 | 11 May 1881 – 7 May 1963, Hungarian-born U.S. aeronautical engineer |
| Martin Karplus | 11 May 2000 | Austrian-born U.S. chemist |
| Paul Karrer | 1 May 1947 | 21 April 1889 – 18 June 1971 |
| Ephraim Katchalski-Katzir | 21 April 1977 | Ukrainian-born Israeli chemist, fourth President of Israel |
| Heinrich Johannes Gustav Kayser | 9 November 1911 | 16 March 1853 – 14 October 1940 |
| August Kekulé | 8 April 1875 | 7 September 1829 – 13 July 1896 |
| Joseph Bishop Keller | 26 June 1986 | |
| Isaak Markovich Khalatnikov | 9 June 1994 | Russian physicist |
| Har Gobind Khorana | 20 April 1978 | |
| Motoo Kimura | 17 June 1993 | 13 November 1924 – 13 November 1994 |
| Gustav Robert Kirchhoff | 8 April 1875 | 12 March 1824 – 17 October 1887 |
| Marc W. Kirschner | 13 May 1999 | U.S. cell biologist |
| George Bogdan Kistiakowsky | 28 April 1960 | 18 November 1900 – 7 December 1982 |
| Kitasato Shibasaburō | 4 June 1908 | 20 December 1852 – 13 June 1931 |
| Christian Felix Klein | 10 December 1885 | 25 April 1849 – 22 June 1925 |
| Klaus von Klitzing | 15 May 2003 | |
| Albert Jan Kluyver | 1 May 1952 | 3 June 1888 – 14 May 1956 |
| Andrew Herbert Knoll | 2015 | 1951 – American. Professor of Natural History |
| Donald Ervin Knuth | 15 May 2003 | |
| Heinrich Hermann Robert Koch | 4 March 1897 | 11 December 1843 – 27 May 1910 |
| Friedrich Wilhelm Georg Kohlrausch | 12 December 1895 | 14 October 1840 – 17 January 1910 |
| Walter Kohn | 14 May 1998 | Austrian-born U.S. chemist, Nobel Prize (1998) |
| Warner Tjardus Koiter | 24 June 1982 | 16 June 1914 – 2 September 1997 |
| Adolph Wilhelm Hermann Kolbe | 13 December 1877 | 27 September 1818 – 25 November 1884 |
| Albert von Kölliker | 24 May 1860 | 6 July 1817 – 2 November 1905 |
| Andrei Nikolaevich Kolmogorov | 23 April 1964 | 25 April 1903 – 20 October 1987 |
| Hermann Kopp | 31 May 1888 | 30 October 1817 – 20 February 1892 Foreign Member |
| Arthur Kornberg | 23 April 1970 | U.S. chemist, Nobel Prize for Medicine (1959) |
| Roger Kornberg | 15 May 2009 | |
| Alexander Onufrievitch Kowalewski | 10 December 1885 | ? 20 November 1840 – 22 November 1901 |
| Schack August Steenberg Krogh | 17 June 1937 | 15 November 1874 – ? 15 September 1949 |
| Hugo Kronecker | 25 March 1909 | 27 January 1839 – 6 June 1914, German-born Swiss physiologist |
| Leopold Kronecker | 31 January 1884 | 7 December 1823 – 29 December 1891, German mathematician |
| Adam Johann von Krusenstern | 27 April 1837 | 19 November 1770 – 24 August 1846 |
| Martin David Kruskal | 15 May 1997 | 28 September 1925 – 26 December 2006, U.S. physicist |
| Stephen William Kuffler | 22 April 1971 | 24 August 1913 – 11 October 1980 |
| Willy Kuhne | 19 May 1892 | 28 March 1837 – ? 10 June 1900 |
| Ernst Eduard Kummer | 18 June 1863 | 29 January 1810 – 14 May 1893 |
| Adolph Theodor Kupffer | 23 April 1846 | 6 January 1799 – 4 June 1865 German-Latvian physicist |
| John Kuriyan | 2015 | American Biologist |

=== L ===
| Name | Election date | Notes |
|---|---|---|
| Félix-Joseph Henri de Lacaze-Duthiers | 25 November 1897 | 15 May 1821 – 21 July 1901 |
| Antoine François Alfred Lacroix | 26 June 1919 | 5 February 1863 – ? 12 March 1948 Foreign Member |
| Johann Lamont | 25 November 1852 | 13 December 1805 – 6 August 1879 |
| Butler Lampson | 2018-05-09 | 23 December 1943 – |
| Edwin Herbert Land | 26 June 1986 | 7 May 1909 – 1 March 1991, U.S. inventor |
| Lev Davydovitch Landau | 28 April 1960 | 22 January 1908 – ? 1 April 1968, Azebarjan-born Russian physicist, Nobel Prize (1962) |
| Karl Landsteiner | 29 March 1941 | 14 June 1868 – 26 June 1943Austrian-born U.S. biologist, Nobel Prize (1930) |
| Paul Langevin | 21 June 1928 | 23 January 1872 – 19 December 1946 |
| Samuel Pierpont Langley | 12 December 1895 | 22 August 1834 – ? 27 February 1906 Foreign Member |
| Irving Langmuir | 27 June 1935 | 31 January 1881 – 16 August 1957 |
| Karl Spencer Lashley | 19 April 1951 | 7 June 1890 – 7 August 1958 |
| Max Theodor Felix von Laue | 12 May 1949 | 9 October 1879 – 24 April 1960 |
| Charles Louis Alphonse Laveran | 23 March 1916 | 18 June 1845 – 18 May 1922 |
| Henri Léon Lebesgue | 3 May 1934 | 28 June 1875 – 26 July 1941 |
| Joshua Lederberg | 26 April 1979 | U.S. scientist medicine, Nobel Prize (1958) |
| Kaj Ulrik Linderstrøm-Lang | 26 April 1956 | 29 November 1896 – 25 May 1959 |
| Susan Lindquist | 2015 | 1949-06-05 – American biologist |
| Solomon Lefschetz | 27 April 1961 | 3 September 1884 – 5 October 1972, Russian-born U.S. mathematician, topology |
| Inge Lehmann | 24 April 1969 | 13 May 1888 – 21 |
| Jean-Marie Pierre Lehn | 17 June 1993 | |
| Luis Federico Leloir | 27 April 1972 | 6 September 1906 – 3 December 1987 |
| Jean Leray | 30 June 1983 | 7 November 1906 – 10 November 1998 |
| Karl Georg Friedrich Rudolph Leuckart | 13 December 1877 | 8 October 1822 – 6 February 1898 Foreign Member |
| Tullio Levi-Civita | 26 June 1930 | 29 March 1873 – ? 29 December 1941, Italian mathematician |
| Rita Levi-Montalcini | 9 March 1995 | Italian-born U.S. scientist, Nobel Prize for Medicine (1986) |
| Edward B. Lewis | 29 June 1989 | 20 May 1918 – 21 July 2004 |
| Gilbert Newton Lewis | 23 May 1940 | 25 October 1875 – 23 March 1946 |
| Franz von Leydig | 9 May 1901 | 21 May 1821 – 13 April 1908 |
| Jiayang Li | 2015 | 1956 – Chinese geneticist |
| Marius Sophus Lie | 12 December 1895 | 18 December 1842 – 18 February 1899 Foreign Member |
| Elliott Lieb | 2 May 2013 | |
| Justus Liebig | 4 June 1840 | 12 May 1803 – ? 10 April 1873 |
| Evgenii Mikhailovich Lifshitz | 24 June 1982 | 22 February 1915 – 7 December 1985 Foreign Member, Russian physicist and astronomer |
| Bernhard August von Lindenau | 6 June 1833 | ? 11 June 1780 – 21 May 1854 |
| Jacques-Louis Lions | 14 March 1996 | 2 May 1928 – 17 May 2001 |
| Joseph Liouville | 21 November 1850 | 24 March 1809 – 8 September 1882 |
| Fritz Albert Lipmann | 3 May 1962 | 12 June 1899 – 24 July 1986, German-born U.S. physicist, Nobel Prize (1962) |
| Gabriel Jonas Lippmann | 26 November 1896 | 16 August 1845 – ? 13 July 1921, Luxembourg-born French physicist, Nobel Prize (1908) |
| Otto Loewi | 29 April 1954 | 3 June 1873 – 25 December 1961, German-born U.S. biochemist and pharmacologist, Nobel Prize (1936) |
| Hendrik Antoon Lorentz | 11 May 1905 | 18 July 1853 – 04 |
| Edward Norton Lorenz | 28 June 1990 | |
| Konrad Zacharias Lorenz | 23 April 1964 | 7 November 1903–27 |
| Sven Ludvig Lovén | 10 December 1885 | 6 January 1809 – 3 September 1895 |
| Jane Lubchenco | 27 May 2004 | |
| Luigi Luciani | 28 February 1918 | 23 November 1842 – 23 June 1919 |
| Carl Friedrich Wilhelm Ludwig | 8 April 1875 | 29 December 1816 – 27 April 1895 |
| Maurice Lugeon | 15 June 1944 | 10 July 1870 – 23 October 1953 |
| Graham Lusk | 2 June 1932 | 15 February 1866 – 18 July 1932 Foreign Member |
| André Michel Lwoff | 24 April 1958 | 8 May 1902 – 30 September 1994, French scientist, Nobel Prize (1965) |
| Feodor Lynen | 24 April 1975 | 6 April 1911 – 6 August 1979 |
