= William Moses (academic) =

English academic and lawyer

William Moses (1623?–1688) was an English academic and lawyer, Master of Pembroke College, Cambridge, during the Interregnum and later serjeant-at-law.

== Life ==
The son of John Moses, merchant tailor, he was born in the parish of St. Saviour, Southwark, about 1623. On 28 March 1632, at age nine, he was admitted to Christ's Hospital, and proceeded in 1639 as an exhibitioner to Pembroke Hall, now Pembroke College, Cambridge, where he graduated B.A. in 1644 and M.A. in 1647. Early in 1655 he was elected Master of Pembroke by the unanimous vote of the fellows. Benjamin Laney had been ejected from the mastership in March 1644, and the post had been successively held by the intruded Richard Vines and Sidrach Simpson. Moses was intruded as fellow at the same time as Vines, and acted as college treasurer for him.

Oliver Cromwell demurred to the appointment of Moses as Master, having wanted another in the post, but on representations made of the services of Moses to the college he withdrew his previous choice. Moses was a good administrator, securing for his college the possession of the benefactions of Sir Robert Hitcham, and rebuilding much of the fabric. He outwitted Cromwell by proceeding to the election to a vacant post, in advance of the anticipated arrival of Cromwell's nomination. Among the fellows of his period in office were William Sampson and Nathaniel Coga, and Nehemiah Grew was admitted.

At the Restoration, Laney was reinstated. Moses was not in orders, and made a choice of the law over medicine as profession. He became counsel to the East India Company, and was favourably noticed by the king and Heneage Finch. He was made serjeant-at-law on 11 June 1688, died a rich bachelor in the same year, and left benefactions to his college.

== Views ==
According to Alexander Gordon writing in the Dictionary of National Biography, Moses was a religious puritan, influenced when young by the Institutions of William Bucanus, which he read at Christ's Hospital in the English version by Robert Hill. He was disinclined to enter the ministry of the Church of England, was averse to presbyterianism and in favour of a moderate episcopacy. A short Latin poem by him is included in Academiae Cantabrigiensis Σώστρα, Cambridge, 1660, a congratulatory collection on the restoration of Charles II. Richard Baxter wanted to have him act as one of the commissioners at the Savoy Conference the following year.

== Notes ==
Academic offices
Preceded by Sidrach Simpson	Master of Pembroke College, Cambridge; 1655–1660	Succeeded by Benjamin Laney
