= Arthur Hutchinson (mineralogist) =

Arthur Hutchinson OBE FRS
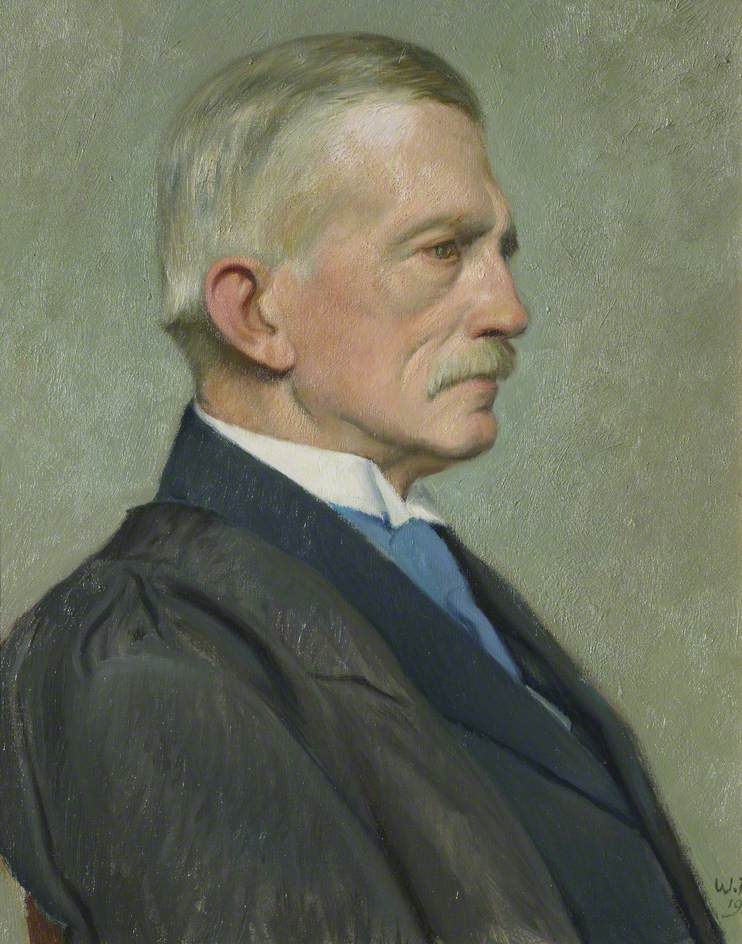
- Arthur Hutchinson by Sir William Rothenstein
- Born: 6 July 1866
- Died: 12 December 1937 (aged 71)
- Education: Clifton College
- Alma mater: Christ's College, Cambridge; University of Würzburg; Ludwig-Maximilians-Universität München
- Occupation: Academic
- Known for: Developed the gas mask for the Royal Navy during World War I Instrumental in developing the Natural Sciences Tripos at the University of Cambridge

Arthur Hutchinson (6 July 1866 – 12 December 1937) was a British mineralogist. During World War I, and at the request of the Admiralty, he was asked to design gas masks suitable for the Navy; for his work, he was awarded the OBE. Hutchinson was elected a Fellow of the Royal Society in 1922. He was master of Pembroke College, Cambridge, from 1928 to 1937, served on the Council of the Royal Society from 1932 to 1934, and was the Society's Vice-President for the year 1933-34.

== Life ==
Hutchinson was born in London. His father was George Hutchinson of Woodside, Westmorland, and his mother was Deborah Richardson of Culgaith in Cumberland. He was educated at Clifton College and Christ's College, Cambridge, where he obtained first classes in both parts of the Natural Sciences Tripos, taking Part II in Chemistry with Mineralogy as a subsidiary subject in 1888. He took his PhD on a chemical thesis 'On the reduction of aromatic amides'.

During World War I, and at the request of the Admiralty, he was asked to design gas masks suitable for the Navy; for his work, he was awarded the OBE. Hutchinson was elected a Fellow of the Royal Society in 1922. He was master of Pembroke College, Cambridge, from 1928 to 1937, served on the Council of the Royal Society from 1932 to 1934, and was a vice-president for the year 1933-34.

Hutchinson and his wife entertained Gandhi at Pembroke College, Cambridge.

Arthur Hutchinson is buried in the Parish of the Ascension Burial Ground in Cambridge, with his wife Evaline Hutchinson, the sister of Sir Arthur Shipley GBE FRS, who lived from 1864 to 1960. Their son was G. Evelyn Hutchinson, also an academic and considered to be the founder of Limnology.

== Notes ==
Academic offices
Preceded by William Sheldon Hadley	Master of Pembroke College, Cambridge; 1928–1937	Succeeded by Sir Montagu Butler
