= Benjamin Laney =

Benjamin Laney may refer to:

- Benjamin Lany (or Laney) (1591–1675), bishop
- Benjamin Travis Laney (1896–1977), Democratic Governor of Arkansas
