= John Hawkins (Master of Pembroke College, Cambridge) =

John Hawkins (25 February 1692, in Creed, Cornwall – 2 August 1733, in Cambridge) was Master of Pembroke College, Cambridge between 1728 and 1733.

Hawkins entered Pembroke College, Cambridge in 1709. He graduated B.A. in 1713, and M.A. in 1716. He became a Fellow of Pembroke, holding that post until his election as Master.

His brother Philip was M.P. for Grampound in Cornwall from 1727 to 1738.

Academic offices
Preceded by Edward Lany	Master of Pembroke College, Cambridge; 1728–1733	Succeeded by James Brown
