= Joseph Turner (priest) =

British academic and clergyman

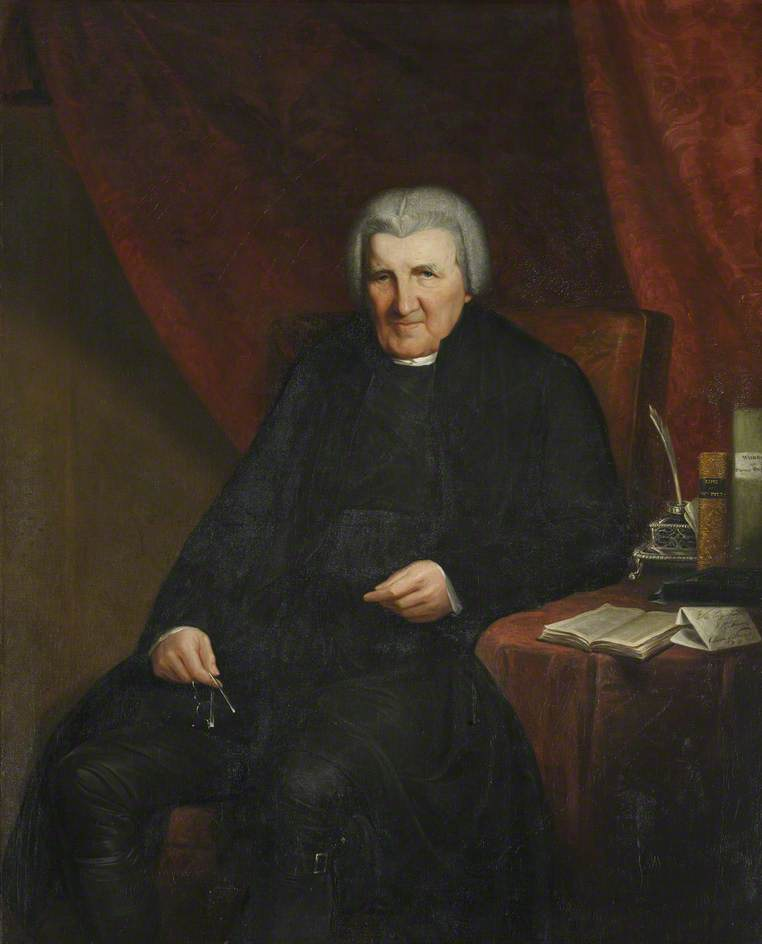
Joseph Turner by George Dawe

Joseph Turner (1745 – 3 August 1828) was a British academic and clergyman.

Turner was born in Great Yarmouth, Norfolk. He entered Pembroke College, Cambridge in 1763 at age 17, and graduated B.A. (Senior Wrangler) in 1767, M.A. in 1770, D.D. (per lit. reg.) in 1785.

He was Senior Tutor of Pembroke College in 1773, when William Pitt, 1st Earl of Chatham wrote to him to enter his son William Pitt the Younger at Pembroke aged 14, and acted as one of Pitt the Younger's tutors.

He was Master of Pembroke College from 1784 to 1828, and Dean of Norwich from 1790 to 1828.

He was a Vice-Chancellor of Cambridge University in 1785–6 and 1805–6.

His only son was William Hamilton Turner, who became vicar of Banwell, Somerset.

Academic offices
Preceded by James Brown	Master of Pembroke College, Cambridge; 1784–1828	Succeeded by Gilbert Ainslie
