= Robert Mapletoft =

English churchman and academic (1609–1677)

Robert Mapletoft (25 January 1609 – 20 August 1677) was an English churchman and academic, Master of Pembroke College, Cambridge and Dean of Ely.

== Life ==
He was son of Hugh Mapletoft, rector of North Thoresby, Lincolnshire, was born there on 25 January 1609, and educated at the grammar school at Louth. He was admitted a sizar of Queens' College, Cambridge, on 25 May 1625, and graduated B. A. in 1628, M.A. 1632, B.D. 1639, D.D. 1660. He was elected fellow of Pembroke College on 8 January 1631, and became chaplain to Bishop Matthew Wren, who till his death was his friend and patron. On Wren's recommendation he was presented to the rectory of Bartlow, Cambridgeshire, by Charles I in 1639, the king exercising the patronage by reason of the outlawry of the patron, Henry Huddleston.

At the parliamentary visitation of the university in 1644 he was ejected as a malignant and a loyalist. After his ejection, he lived quietly, at one time in the house of Sir Robert Shirley, 4th Baronet in Leicestershire, where he made the acquaintance of Gilbert Sheldon. During the protectorate he officiated for some time to a private congregation in Lincoln, according to the ritual of the Church of England. At the Restoration he received the degree of Doctor of Divinity by royal mandate, 28 January 1660, and on 23 August he was presented by the crown to the subdeanery of Lincoln Cathedral, and on 8 December received the mastership of the Spital Hospital at Spital-in-the-Street, Lincolnshire. While subdean he was involved in a dispute with the precentor of the cathedral, John Featley, with regard to some capitular appointments, and was attacked by him in a tract entitled Speculum Mapletoftianum ('The Mirror of Mapletoft'). As master of the Spital Hospital he exerted himself for the revival of the charity, in conjunction with Dean Michael Honywood. A bill in chancery was exhibited in 1662 against Sir John Wray for the restoration of the estates, and Mapletoft at his own expense rebuilt the demolished chapel and increased its revenues.

He also received from the crown the living of Clayworth, Nottinghamshire, which in 1672 he exchanged for the college living of Soham, Cambridgeshire, resigning his fellowship. He was nominated master of Pembroke, but he waived in favour of Mark Frank, whom he succeeded as master in 1664. He held the office, together with the benefice of Soham, till his death. He served as vice-chancellor of the University of Cambridge in 1671. He was made dean of Ely on 7 August 1667, holding the subdeanery of Lincoln with the deanery till 1671.

When in 1668 Anne Hyde, Duchess of York, began to waver in her allegiance to the Church of England, Mapletoft was recommended as her chaplain by Sheldon; but he was reluctant to undertake the office. He died on 20 August 1677 in the master's lodge at Pembroke, and, by his desire, was buried in the chapel, near the grave of his patron, Matthew Wren.

== Family ==
He was cousin to Nicholas Ferrar, and was one of his intimates, a frequent visitor to the Little Gidding community; on Ferrar's death he preached the funeral sermon and officiated. His brother, Joshua Mapletoft, married Susanna Collett, Ferrar's niece, and was father of the physician John Mapletoft. Mapletoft himself was unmarried.

Academic offices
Preceded by Mark Frank	Master of Pembroke College, Cambridge; 1664–1677	Succeeded by Nathaniel Coga
