= Mark Frank (theologian) =

English churchman and academic

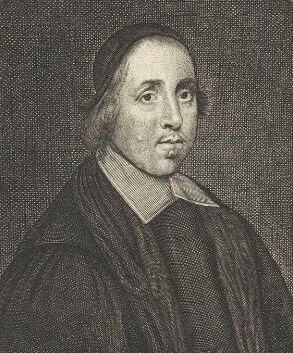
Mark Frank

Mark Frank or Franck (1613–1664) was an English churchman and academic, Master of Pembroke College, Cambridge.

== Life ==
He was baptised at Little Brickhill, Buckinghamshire, and was admitted pensioner of Pembroke College, Cambridge, 4 July 1627. He was elected to a scholarship in 1630, and to a fellowship 8 October 1634, having become M.A. the same year. In 1641 he became B.D., and was chosen junior treasurer of his college, and senior treasurer in 1642.

He had attracted the favourable notice of Charles I by a sermon he preached at Paul's Cross before the lord mayor and aldermen in 1641 on Jeremiah xxxv. 18-19, which the king commanded to be printed. In this sermon he propounds the Rechabites as an example of obedience; 'It is a usual thing nowadays,' he says, 'to direct our governours what to do, what to read, what to command; then, forsooth, we will obey them.' In 1644 he was ejected as a malignant by the parliamentary visitors, on his refusal to take the Solemn League and Covenant.

At the Restoration, Frank was re-established in his fellowship on 10 August 1660 and rewarded by ecclesiastical promotions. He was made D.D. by royal mandate in 1661 and was chosen master of his college on 23 August 1662, in succession to Benjamin Lany. Archbishop William Juxon appointed him one of his chaplains, and he held the office of domestic chaplain and ex officio licenser of theological works to Juxon's successor, Archbishop Gilbert Sheldon, by whom he was presented to the archdeaconry of St Albans, and to the treasurership of St Paul's Cathedral, 19 December 1660. He was also presented to the rectory of Barley, Hertfordshire, on 2 February 1664, by Matthew Wren. He died the following year, at the age of 51 and was buried in St Paul's Cathedral near the entrance of the north door.

== Works ==
Course of Sermons for all the Sundays and Festivals throughout the Year (1672) was published after his death. It was republished, in two volumes, in the Library of Anglo-Catholic Theology.

== Notes ==
Academic offices
Preceded by Benjamin Lany	Master of Pembroke College, Cambridge; 1662–1664	Succeeded by Robert Mapletoft
