= Patrick Hadley =

British composer (1899-1973)

Patrick Arthur Sheldon Hadley (5 March 1899 – 17 December 1973) was a British composer.

== Biography ==
Patrick Sheldon Hadley was born on 5 March 1899 in Cambridge. His father, William Sheldon Hadley, was at that time a fellow of Pembroke College. His mother, Edith Jane, was the daughter of the Revd Robert Foster, chaplain to the Royal Hibernian Military School in Dublin.

Patrick attended St Ronan's Preparatory School (in Worthing, Sussex) and Winchester College (in Hampshire). However the First World War interrupted his education. He enlisted in the army and was commissioned as a second lieutenant in the Royal Field Artillery. He managed to survive unscathed until the last weeks of the war, when he received an injury necessitating the below-knee amputation of his right leg. This profoundly damaged his confidence and also caused him to perhaps drink more than was wise; he was in constant pain, for which alcohol provided some relief. Patrick's elder brother Peyton Sheldon Hadley, a former pupil of Charterhouse School, who served in the infantry, was also wounded in the closing months of the War. He was invalided home to convalesce, but died of pneumonia that October. A memorial to Peyton is found in the Charterhouse School Chapel.

After the war Patrick went up to Pembroke College, Cambridge, where by now his father was Master. He was fortunate to study with both Charles Wood and the English composer Cyril Rootham. Hadley was awarded B.Mus. in 1922, and an MA in 1925. He then went to the Royal College of Music in London. Here he came under the influence of Ralph Vaughan Williams for composition and Adrian Boult and Malcolm Sargent for conducting. Eric Weatherell notes that Hadley's contemporaries at the RCM included Constant Lambert and Gordon Jacob. He won the Sullivan prize for composition: at that time the sum of 5 shillings.

He became a member of the RCM staff in 1925 and taught composition. He became acquainted with Frederick Delius (Eric Fenby describes the role played by Hadley in recovering the long-lost score of Delius's early opera Koanga), Ernest John Moeran, Sir Arnold Bax, William Walton, Alan Rawsthorne, and Herbert Howells.

During 1937–38, Hadley assisted his friend and former teacher Cyril Rootham (by then terminally ill) in completing his Second Symphony. Acting as amanuensis, Hadley and others took dictation and transcribed the entire sketch for the symphony and the orchestration of the first two movements. At Rootham's request, Hadley also completed the orchestration of the final movement after the composer's death in March 1938.

In 1938 Hadley was elected to a Fellowship at Gonville and Caius College in Cambridge and appointed as a lecturer in the music faculty. Much of his time was spent in mundane administrative activities, but there was still time available for composition. Some of his greatest works were written during and after the war.

During the Second World War he deputised for Boris Ord as conductor and musical director of the Cambridge University Music Society. There he introduced a number of important works, including Delius' Appalachia and A Song of the High Hills. He was keen to promote a wide range of music, including the formation of a Gilbert and Sullivan Society. Much of his time was spent in making arrangements for the use of the males in the choir. Sadly, few of these have survived. We know them only from programme notes and hearsay.

In 1946, he was elected to the Chair of Music at Cambridge University. He retained this post until his retirement in 1962. Some of the students taught by Hadley included Raymond Leppard, Sir David Lumsden, Patrick Gowers, Sir Philip Ledger, Peter le Huray and Richard Hey Lloyd.

In 1962, Hadley retired to Heacham in Norfolk, living in Shalcross, Wilton Road. He wished to pursue his interest in folk song collection. However, he latterly struggled with throat cancer and this caused many of his activities to be suspended. Patrick Hadley died, aged 74, on 17 December 1973 at King's Lynn.

== Music ==
Patrick Hadley was influenced by the music of Frederick Delius and also to a certain extent folk music. But there were other non-musical influences in his life too: Ireland and Norfolk gave him a profound sense of landscape and location. His output was limited. He found the business of composing quite exhausting. Most people think of Hadley as composer of one or two church anthems: I Sing of a Maiden and the mildly exotic My Beloved spake. The catalogue shows a wide variety of musical forms: from a symphonic ballad to incidental music for Twelfth Night. However, there are no cycles of symphonies, concertos, or string quartets. He maintained throughout his a career a sense of the lyrical. Not for him was the experimental music of the Second Vienna School. He had an exceptional understanding of how to set words to music. Much of his music is meditative and quite inward looking.

As noted by Bernard Benoliel, in many ways Hadley is a link between Vaughan Williams and Benjamin Britten. For example, the first movement of The Trees so High anticipates in some respects the opening movement of Vaughan Williams's Fifth Symphony, while the 'Taxal Woods' scene from The Hills has a sparely atmospheric, Britten-like quality. Hadley was not so drawn into the folk song revival as Vaughan Williams, though much of his music has subtle folk characteristics.

Many of the shorter works in the composer's output, such as anthems for liturgical use, were connected with the choir of Gonville and Caius College, Cambridge. He also made a number of arrangements of works in many different genres, from Verdi's Stabat Mater to Waltzing Matilda.

== Works ==
- Ephemera. On 19 March 1925 Constant Lambert was the piano soloist at a College concert for a performance of this setting of W B Yeats for soprano, flute, oboe, string quartet and piano. Ephemera was probably influenced by Peter Warlock's The Curlew (1920–22) and approaches the Celtic twilight mood of Warlock's piece, though it is less melancholic. Lambert conducted the work again in a version for soprano and small orchestra in a BBC broadcast on 18 December 1931. It remained unpublished.
- Scene from The Woodlanders. Another song of farewell scored for similar ensemble. A setting of Thomas Hardy, it is more assured than Ephemera and was accepted for publication by Hubert Foss at the Oxford University Press in 1926. Hadley continued to write works for solo voice and small ensemble throughout his career, such as Mariana (setting Tennyson) in 1937 and Lines from 'The Cenci' (setting Shelley) in 1951.
- The Trees So High. One of Hadley's undoubted masterpieces is his Symphonic Ballad: The Trees So High, completed in 1931, and first performed in Cambridge the following year. It was at one stage described by Hadley as a 'symphony in A minor'. Scored for baritone, chorus, and full orchestra, it uses the melodic framework and text of the Somerset folksong of that name. There are four movements, though only the last features the chorus and soloist, quoting the folksong explicitly in its entirety. Hadley characterised the form as ‘three independent brooks which flow into one stream at the beginning of the finale’.
- La Belle Dame sans merci. This 'short masterpiece' from 1935 is scored for tenor solo, mixed chorus, and orchestra and sets the well-known poem by Keats. It lasts approximately 10 minutes in performance.
- The Hills. Completed in 1944, this is perhaps the finest of Hadley's cantatas, the other two being Fen and Flood and Connemara, both dating from the 1950s. The Hills has strong autobiographical links, dealing with the meeting, courtship and marriage of his parents, introduced retrospectively by the narrator (bass soloist) as he returns after his mother's death to the landscape where these events once took place. Hadley wrote: 'I lost my mother in 1940 and that set my mind to the Derbyshire hills where she met my father.' Many specific local place-names are quoted in the text. As Christopher Palmer notes, the emotion which the composer is ever concerned to communicate is ecstasy.
- Fen and Flood. Completed in 1955, its text both provides a history of the Norfolk Fens and commemorates the devastating floods that hit the North Norfolk coast on the night of 31 January 1953. Originally performed in 1955 by reduced forces and a male voice chorus, it was arranged by Vaughan Williams for a larger ensemble including mixed chorus, to increase the chances of the work being performed. At the first performance of the expanded version in 1956 one of the soloists was Fred Calvert, the King's Lynn Superintendent of Police who had directed the emergency operations during the floods. The text he sang was the words he used during the emergency!
- One Morning in Spring. Hadley wrote little for orchestra alone: purely instrumental music did not hold much attraction for him. Perhaps the gentlest introduction to Hadley is his short orchestral work One Morning in Spring, which was composed to celebrate Ralph Vaughan Williams' seventieth birthday in 1942. It is a fine example of an English tone poem. The early (1923) orchestral sketch Kinder Scout, a musical evocation of the distinctive Derbyshire peak, remained in manuscript and was only recorded for the first time in September 2019 by the BBC Philharmonic Orchestra, conducted by Rumon Gamba. It is strikingly scored, calling for cor anglais but no oboes.
- Lenton Meditations. This (also known as A Lenten Cantata or A Cantata for Lent) was Hadley's last major work, completed in 1962. It is a setting of Biblical texts, written for tenor and bass soloists, chorus and orchestra with organ.

=== Recordings ===
- La Belle Dame sans merci: Neill Archer (tenor), Philharmonia Chorus, Philharmonia Orchestra, conducted by Matthias Bamert, 1992, reissued on CD as Chandos CHAN 241-22.
- Fen and Flood, arranged by Ralph Vaughan Williams for soloists, mixed chorus and orchestra: Mary Bevan (soprano), Leigh Melrose (baritone), Joyful Company of Singers, Bournemouth Symphony Orchestra, conducted by Paul Daniel, 2010, issued on Albion Records ALBCD 012.
- The Hills, Felicity Palmer (soprano), Robert Tear (tenor), Robert Lloyd (bass), Cambridge University Musical Society Chorus, London Philharmonic Orchestra conducted by Philip Ledger, 1975, reissued on CD as EMI CDM 5 67118 2.
- I sing of a maiden: Choir of King's College, Cambridge and Francis Grier (organ), conducted by Philip Ledger, 1975, reissued on CD as EMI CDM 5 67118 2.
- Kinder Scout. BBC Philharmonic conducted by Rumon Gamba, on British Tone Poems Volume 2, Chandos Records CHAN 10981, September 2019.
- Lenten Meditations (aka Cantata for Lent): Neill Archer (tenor), Stephen Richardson (bass), Leslie Pearson (organ), Philharmonia Chorus, Philharmonia Orchestra, conducted by Matthias Bamert, 1992, reissued on CD as Chandos CHAN 241-22.
- My beloved spake: Choir of King's College, Cambridge and James Lancelot (organ), conducted by Sir David Willcocks, 1973, reissued on CD as EMI CDM 5 67118 2.
- One Morning in Spring: London Philharmonic Orchestra, conducted by Sir Adrian Boult, 1979, reissued on Lyrita SRCD 245.
- One Morning in Spring: Philharmonia Orchestra, conducted by Matthias Bamert, 1992, reissued on CD as Chandos CHAN 241-22.
- The Trees so High: David Wilson-Johnson (baritone), Philharmonia Chorus, Philharmonia Orchestra, conducted by Matthias Bamert, 1992, reissued on CD as Chandos CHAN 241-22.
- The Trees so High: Thomas Allen (baritone), Guildford Philharmonic Choir, New Philharmonia Orchestra, conducted by Vernon Handley, 1979, reissued on CD as Lyrita SRCD 238.

== List of works ==
- Kinder Scout (1923), tone poem for orchestra
- Ephemera (1925), text Yeats, soprano and chamber ensemble
- Scene from The Woodlanders (1925) text Hardy, voice and chamber ensemble
- Lullaby (1929), song, text Richard Rowlands
- The Trees So High, symphonic ballad (1931), for baritone, chorus, and full orchestra
- String Quartet (1933)
- La Belle Dame sans merci (1935), text Keats, for tenor, chorus and orchestra
- I Sing of a Maiden (1936), short piece for chorus and organ
- The Solitary Reaper (1936), text Wordsworth, part song for unaccompanied choir
- Mariana (1937), text Tennyson, voice and chamber ensemble
- My Beloved Spake (1938), short piece for chorus and organ
- Antigone (1939), incidental music for voices and chamber ensemble
- One Morning in Spring (1942), for orchestra
- The Travellers (1942), text Alan Pryce-Jones, cantata for soprano, chorus and orchestra
- The Hills (1944), cantata for soloists, chorus and orchestra
- Lines from 'The Cenci' (1951), text Shelley, voice and chamber ensemble
- Agamemnon (1953), incidental music for voices and chamber ensemble
- Fen and Flood (1955), cantata for chorus and orchestra
- Connemara (1958), cantata for soprano, tenor, baritone, chorus and orchestra
- Cantata for Lent (1962), for tenor and bass soloists, chorus and orchestra with organ.
