= List of masters of Pembroke College, Cambridge =

The Master is the head of Pembroke College, Cambridge. The following persons have served as Masters.

List of masters
Name	Image	Master between		Notes	Ref(s).
Robert de Thorpe		1347? (fl. 1354)	c. 1364		
Thomas de Bingham		c. 1364	c. 1374		
John Tynmouth or Tinmew		1374? (fl. 1380)	1385†		
Richard Morys		1385? (fl. 1389)	1406?		
John Sudbury		1406	1428 (resigned)		
John Langton		1428	22 May 1447†		
Hugh Damlet		1447	1449 (resigned)		
Lawrence Booth		31 May 1450	19 May 1480†		
Thomas Rotherham		1480	1488 (resigned)		
George Fitzhugh		14 September 1488	November 1505†		
Roger Leyburn		29 November 1505	c. 1 August 1507†		
Richard Foxe		1507	19 October 1518 (resigned)	Bishop of Exeter, Bath and Wells, Durham, and Winchester, founder of Corpus Christi College, Oxford	
Robert Shorton		1518	1534 (resigned)		
Robert Swinburn		before 4 October 1534	October 1537 (resigned)		
George Folberry		1537	October 1540†		
Nicholas Ridley		October 1540	1554 (deprived)	Bishop of London and Westminster, one of the Oxford Martyrs burned at the stake during the Marian Persecutions	
John Young (I)		24 December 1554	20 July 1559 (deprived)		
Edmund Grindal		20 July 1559	16 August 1561 (resigned)		
Matthew Hutton		14 May 1562	1567 (resigned)		
John Whitgift		21 April 1567	July 1567 (resigned)	Archbishop of Canterbury (1583–1604)	
John Young (II)		12 July 1567	16 March 1578 (resigned)		
William Fulke		10 May 1578	28 August 1589†		
Lancelot Andrewes		6 September 1589	1605 (resigned)		
Samuel Harsnett		November 1605	18 February 1616 (resigned)		
Nicholas Felton		29 June 1616	18 February 1619 (resigned)		
Jerome Beale		21 February 1619	September 1630†		
Benjamin Lany		25 December 1630	13 March 1644 (ejected)		
Richard Vines		13 March 1644	1 October 1650 (ejected)		
Sidrach Simpson		1650	April 1655†		
William Moses		April 1655	1660 (ejected)		
Benjamin Lany		1660 (restored)	16 August 1662 (resigned)		
Mark Frank		23 August 1662	January 1664†		
Robert Mapletoft		c. May 1664	20 August 1677†		
Nathaniel Coga		20 August 1677	8 January 1694†		
Thomas Browne		10 February 1694	9 March 1707†		
Edward Lany		19 March 1707	9 August 1728†		
John Hawkins		15 August 1728	October 1733 (resigned)		
Roger Long		12 October 1733	16 December 1770†		
James Brown		16 December 1770	30 September 1784†		
Joseph Turner		6 October 1784	3 August 1828†		
Gilbert Ainslie		15 August 1828	9 January 1870†		
John Power		14 January 1870	18 November 1880†		
Charles Edward Searle		24 November 1880	29 July 1902†		
Sir George Gabriel Stokes, Bt.		26 August 1902	7 February 1903†		
Arthur James Mason		11 March 1903	15 June 1912 (resigned)		
William Sheldon Hadley		19 June 1912	25 December 1927†		
Arthur Hutchinson		16 January 1928	30 September 1937 (retired)		
Sir Montagu Sherard Dawes Butler		1 October 1937	31 July 1948 (retired)		
Sir Sydney Castle Roberts		1 August 1948	1958		
Sir William Vallance Douglas Hodge		1 August 1958	1970		
William Anthony Camps		1970	1981		
The Lord Adrian		1981	1992		
Sir Roger Tomkys		1992	2004	British diplomat, was appointed a Deputy Lieutenant of Cambridgeshire in 1996	
Sir Richard Dearlove		2004	31 July 2015	British intelligence officer who was head of the British Secret Intelligence Service (MI6)	
The Lord Smith of Finsbury		2015	31 July 2025 (retired)	Served as Secretary of State for Culture, Media and Sport from 1997 to 2001, former Member of Parliament (MP) for Islington South and Finsbury, was elected Chancellor of the university in 2025	
Rosalind Polly Blakesley		2025	1st October 2025 (incumbent)	Professor of Russian and European Art at the University of Cambridge	
