= Roger Long =

English astronomer

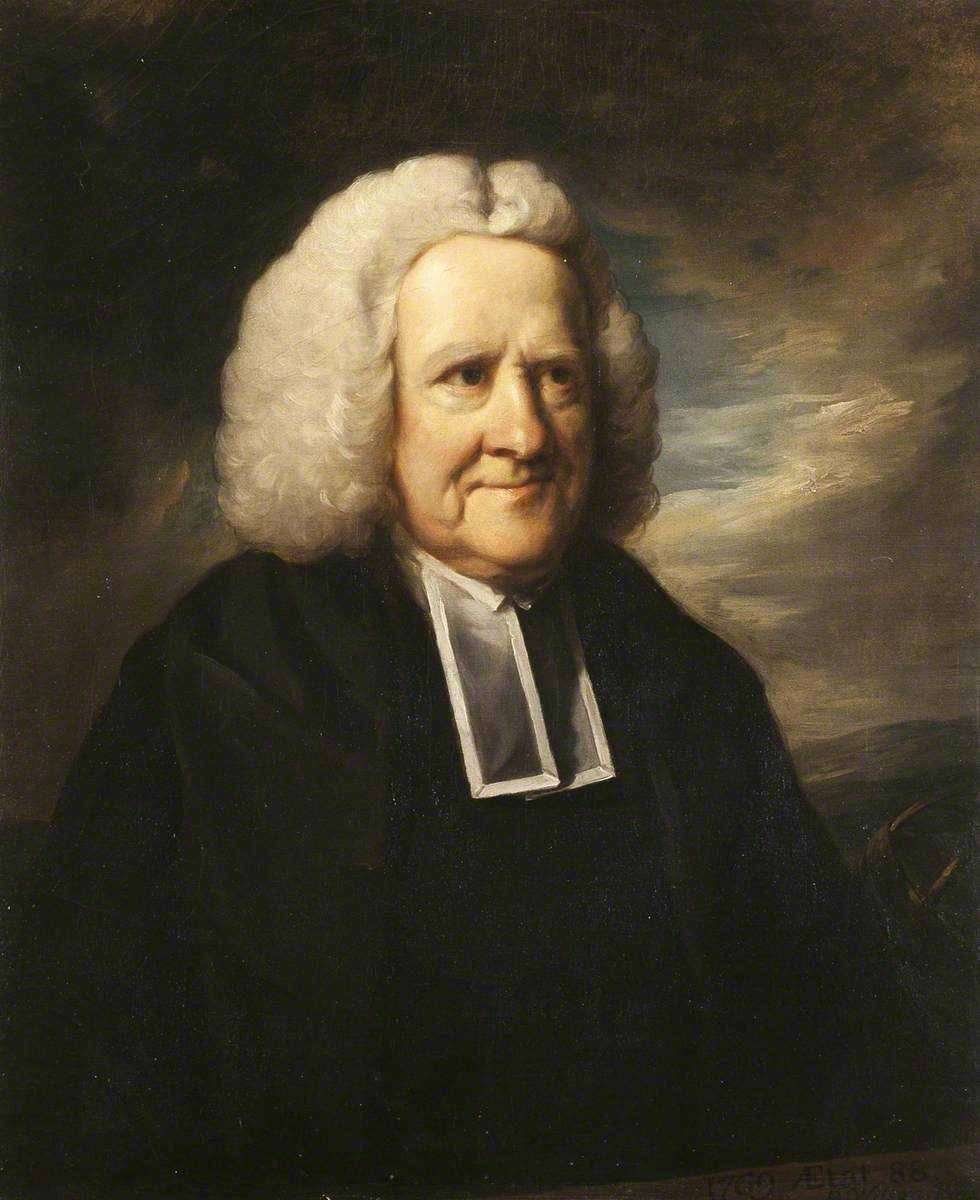
Roger Long by Benjamin Wilson

Roger Long (1680 – 16 December 1770) was an English astronomer, and Master of Pembroke College, Cambridge between 1733 and 1770.

Roger Long was the son of Thomas Long of Croxton, Norfolk. He was educated at Norwich School and later admitted to Pembroke College, Cambridge in 1696/7. Graduating BA in 1700/1, he became a fellow of Pembroke. He was ordained in 1716, and became Rector of Orton Waterville. He became a Doctor of Divinity in 1728, and Master of Pembroke in 1733. From 1750 until 1770 he was the first holder of the Lowndean Professorship of Astronomy.

One of the great characters of eighteenth-century Cambridge, he built a "water-work" in his garden and paddled round it on a water-cycle. He also constructed a "zodiack", now considered to be the first planetarium, a hollow sphere that could hold thirty people showing the movements of the planets and constellations which remained in the grounds of Pembroke until 1871.

Academic offices
Preceded by John Hawkins	Master of Pembroke College, Cambridge; 1733–1770	Succeeded by James Brown
