= Theodore Forbes Leith =

Scottish physician

- Born: 1746; Aberdeenshire, Scotland
- Died: 6 September 1819 (aged 72–73); Aberdeenshire, Scotland
- Occupation: Physician

Theodore Forbes Leith (1746 – 6 September 1819) was a Scottish medical doctor. Benjamin Franklin received a letter from Leith on how to make Parmesan cheese.

== Biography ==
He was the second son of John Forbes Leith and Jean Morrison, and was born in 1746 in Aberdeenshire. He studied medicine in the university of Edinburgh, where he graduated M.D. 12 September 1768. His thesis was read 31 August 1768, and was published at the University Press. It is on the delirium of fever, is dedicated to William Cullen and John Gregory, his instructors, and shows some subtlety of distinction and of argument. He practised at Greenwich, and was elected F.R.S. in 1781, and 26 June 1786 licentiate of the College of Physicians of London. In 1806, on the death of his elder brother, he inherited Whitehaugh, Aberdeenshire, went to reside there, and there he died, after breaking his clavicle, 6 September 1819.

He married Marie d'Arboine in 1776, and had six children.

In 1789 he married for the second time, to Lucy, daughter of Anthony Crunskhorn of Rochester, and had a son George Forbes Leith, of Knock, Old Deer, Aberdeenshire. George married Mary Godwin, who had previously had three illegitimate children by Edward Harbord, later 3rd Lord Suffield.
