= William Sheldon Hadley =

British scholar

The subject was sometimes surnamed "Hadley", and sometimes "Sheldon Hadley"

William Sheldon Hadley, LL.D (22 October 1859, Moseley – 25 December 1927, Heacham) was a British academic in the late 19th and early 20th centuries.

Hadley was educated at Pembroke College, Cambridge, graduating B.A. in 1882, and M.A. in 1885. He became a Fellow of Pembroke in 1882; a Lecturer in Classics in 1884; and Master of Pembroke in 1912.

He was married to Edith Hadley, the daughter of the Reverend Robert Foster, chaplain to the Royal Hibernian Military School in Dublin. Their elder son, Isaac Peyton Sheldon Hadley, served in the First World War, was awarded a Military Cross, and, having been invalided home to convalesce, died of influenza in October 1918. Their younger son, Patrick Hadley, also served in the War, during which he lost a leg, and went on to become a composer.

== Works ==
- The War List of Pembroke College, 1914–1918, Cambridge University Press, 1922.
- The Alcestis of Euripides, Cambridge University Press, 1896 (Pitt Press Series).
- The Hecuba of Euripides, Cambridge University Press, 1894 (Pitt Press Series).
- Euripides, Hippolytus, Cambridge University Press, c. 1890.
