= James Brown (academic) =

James Brown (1709–1784) was an English cleric and academic. He was Master of Pembroke College, Cambridge from 1770 until his death. A close friend of Thomas Gray, he acted with William Mason as executor of Gray's will.

== Life ==
His father was a London goldsmith. He was educated at Christ's Hospital, and matriculated at Pembroke College in 1726, graduating B.A. in 1730 and M.A. in 1733. He became a Fellow of Pembroke in 1735. Ordained as Anglican priest in 1736, he became vicar of Shepreth from 1737. He was Vice-Chancellor of the University of Cambridge in 1771-2. From 1771 he was vicar of Stretham.

== Notes ==
Academic offices
Preceded by Roger Long	Master of Pembroke College, Cambridge; 1770-1784	Succeeded by Joseph Turner
