= Richard Vines (minister) =

English clergyman

Richard Vines (1600, Blaston – 4 February 1655/6) was an English clergyman, one of the Presbyterian leaders of the Westminster Assembly. He became Master of Pembroke Hall, Cambridge, from 1644 to 1650.

== Life ==
He graduated B.A. from Magdalene College, Cambridge, in 1622, with an M.A. there in 1627. He taught at Hinckley, and then became rector of Weddington and Caldecote. In 1643 he was appointed to the Westminster Assembly and became rector of St Clement Danes. The next year he was intruded as Master of Pembroke. The college had had all its fellows expelled, and soldiers had been billeted in it. Vines arrived with a new set of fellows.

Having become rector of Watton-at-Stone in 1645, he lost all his positions after refusing the 'engagement' pledge in 1649. Shortly after that he became minister at St Lawrence Jewry. Around this time Richard Baxter struck up a relationship with Vines, considered a moderate, and Thomas Hill, with the aim of unifying the various factions divided on the religious question.

== Works ==
- Calebs Integrity (1642/1646)
- The Impostures of Seducing Teachers Discovered (1644/1656)
- The Posture of David's Spirit (1644/1656)
- The Happinesse of Israel (1645)
- The Purifying of Unclean Hearts and Hands (1646)
- The Authours, Nature, and Danger of Heresie (1647/1662)
- The Corruption of Minde Described (1655)
- A Treatise of the Right Institution, Administration, and Receiving of the Sacrament of the Lords-Supper (1657/1660/1677)
- Christ, a Christian's Only Gain (1660)
- God's Drawing and Man's Coming to Christ (1662)
- The Saints Nearness to God (1662)

== Notes ==
Academic offices
Preceded by Benjamin Laney	Master of Pembroke College, Cambridge; 1645–1650	Succeeded by Sidrach Simpson
