= Tony Lees =

British entomologist (1917–1992)

Anthony David Lees FRS (27 February 1917 – 3 October 1992) was a British entomologist.
