= Edward Lany =

Edward Lany, FRS (1667 in Harrow – 1728 in Cambridge) was Master of Pembroke College, Cambridge from 1707 until his death.

Lany entered Pembroke College, Cambridge in 1709. He graduated B.A. in 1687, M.A. in 1690 and D.D. in 1707. He became a Fellow of Pembroke in 1688, and was ordained in 1689. He held livings at Salle and Chrishall; and was a Chaplain to William III. He was also Vice-Chancellor of the University of Cambridge from 1707 to 1708.

Lany died on 9 August 1728.

Academic offices
Preceded by Thomas Browne	Master of Pembroke College, Cambridge; 1707-1728	Succeeded by John Hawkins
Preceded by John Balderston	Vice-Chancellor of the University of Cambridge; 1707-1708	Succeeded by John Covel
