= Benjamin Lany =

British bishop (1591–1675)

The Right Reverend Benjamin Lany FRS
- Bishop of Ely
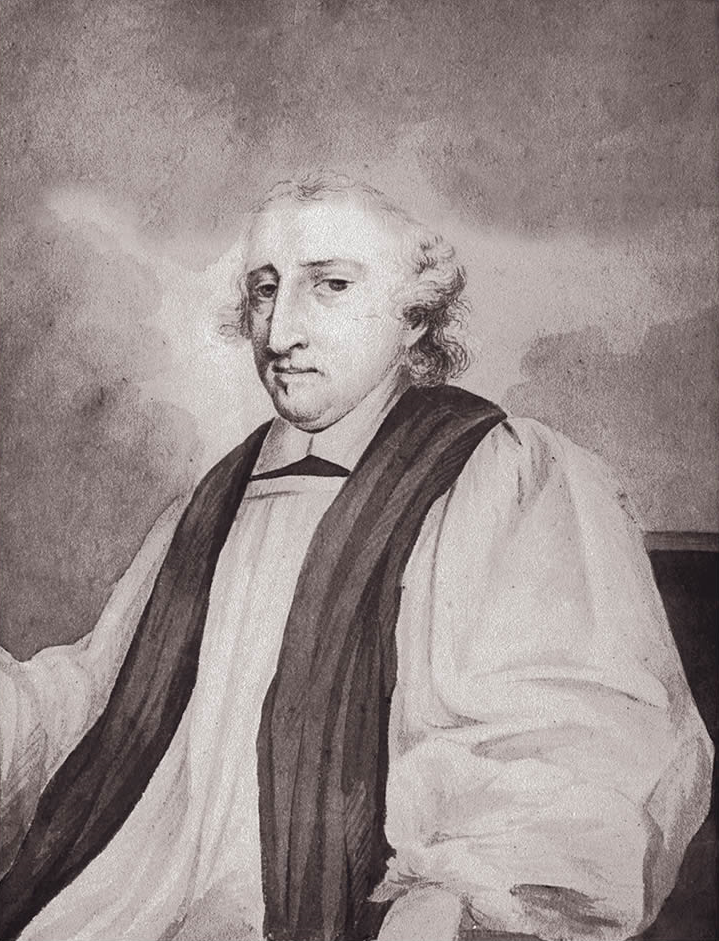
- Diocese: Diocese of Ely
- In office: 1667–1675
- Predecessor: Peter Gunning
- Successor: Matthew Wren
- Other posts: Bishop of Peterborough (1660–1663); Bishop of Lincoln (1663–1667)

Orders
- Consecration: 2 December 1660 by Accepted Frewen

Personal details
- Born: 1591 Ipswich
- Died: 24 January 1675 (aged 84)
- Buried: Ely Cathedral
- Denomination: Anglican
- Education: Christ's College, Cambridge

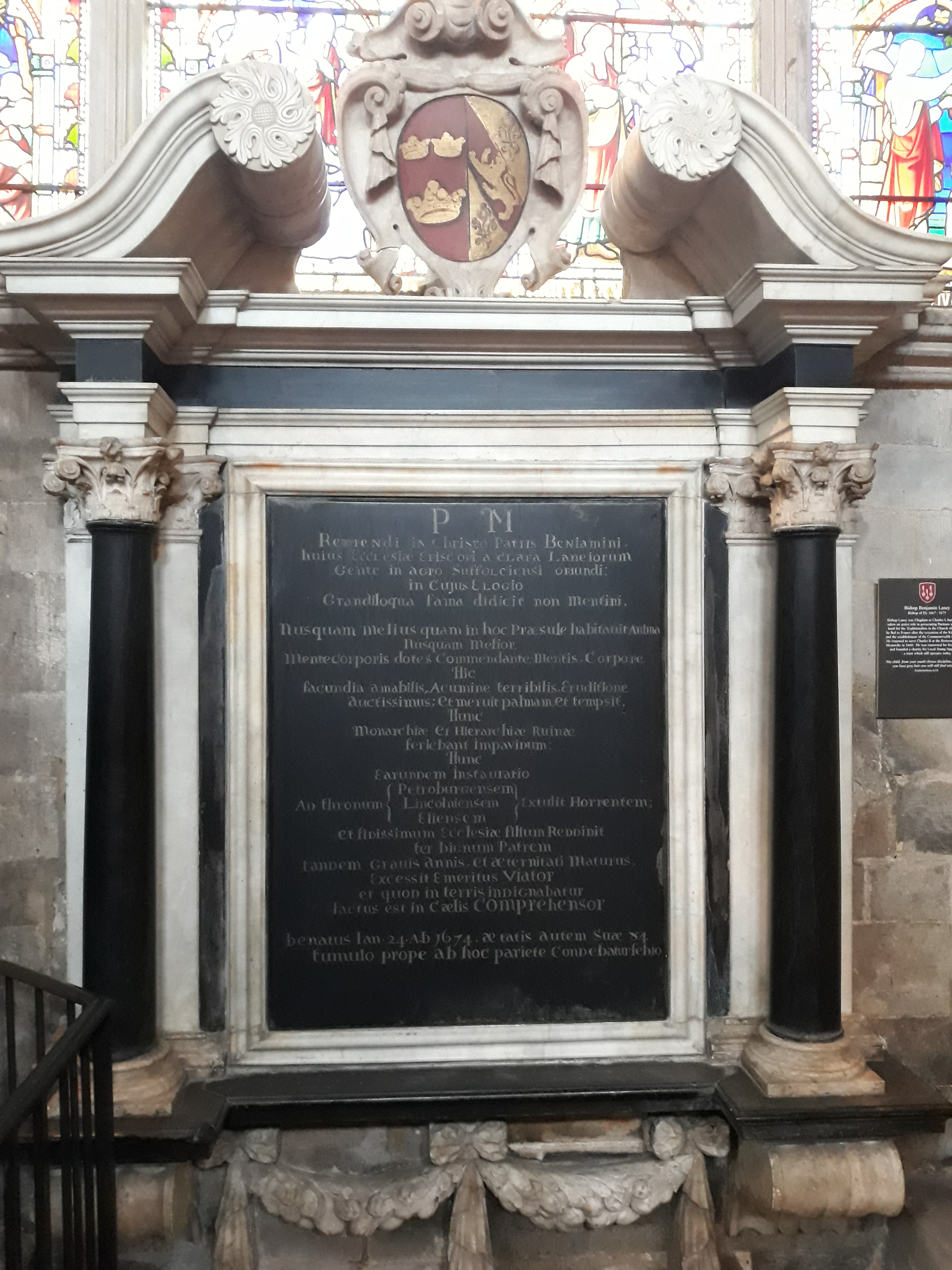
Monument to Bishop Benjamin Laney in Ely Cathedral

Benjamin Lany FRS (or Laney; 1 January 1591 – 24 January 1675) was an English academic and bishop.

== Early life ==
The son of John Laney, Benjamin Lany was born in Ipswich. He entered Christ's College, Cambridge in 1608, graduating B.A. 1612, M.A. 1615, B.D. 1622, D.D. 1630. He became a Fellow of Pembroke Hall, Cambridge in 1616.

== Career (pre Civil War) ==
He was ordained on 21 February 1619. After a curacy at Madingley he held livings at Hambledon, Hampshire, Bishops Waltham and Buriton. He was also Chaplain to the Bishop of Winchester from 1628. He became Master of Pembroke in 1630.

By Richard Neile he was appointed to the rectory of Buriton with Petersfield, Hampshire, and on 31 July 1631.

He became Vice-Chancellor of the University of Cambridge in 1632.

== Civil War years ==
Lany was appointed on 19 June 1639 to a prebendal stall in Westminster, on the king's nomination. As a devoted royalist and high churchman, Lany on the outbreak of the civil wars become the subject of fierce hostility to the puritan party. He was denounced by Prynne as "one of the professed Arminians, Laud's creatures to prosecute his designs in the university of Cambridge", who, when one Adams was brought before the authorities for preaching in favour of confession to a "priest, had united with the majority of the doctors in acquitting him". When the parliament exercised supreme power he was deprived of all his preferments, his rectory of Buriton being sequestered "to the use of one Robert Harris, a godly and orthodox divine, and member of the Assembly of Ministers"

In 1643 Edward Montagu, 2nd Earl of Manchester and Simeon Ashe led a visitation to the University on behalf of Parliament. This saw Lany deprived of his position. He went into exile with the future Charles II of England.

== Career (post Civil War) ==
After the Restoration of 1660, he became Dean of Rochester — he was instituted on 8 August. He became Bishop of Peterborough the same year — he was elected to the See on 20 October 1660, confirmed 17 November, and consecrated a bishop on 2 December 1660. He then served as Bishop of Lincoln from 1663 — elected 10 March and confirmed 2 April — and Bishop of Ely from 1667. He was elected to that See on 24 May and confirmed 12 June.

He became a Fellow of the Royal Society in 1666.

== Notes and references ==
=== Sources ===
- Venables, Edmund (1885). "Laney, Benjamin" . In Lee, Sidney (ed.). Dictionary of National Biography. Vol. 32. London: Smith, Elder & Co. pp. 82–83.

Academic offices
Preceded by Jerome Beale	Master of Pembroke College, Cambridge; 1630–1644	Succeeded by Richard Vines
Preceded by Thomas Comber	Vice-Chancellor of the University of Cambridge; 1632–1633	Succeeded by Richard Love
Preceded by William Moses	Master of Pembroke College, Cambridge; 1660–1662	Succeeded by Mark Franck
Church of England titles
Preceded by Thomas Turner vacant from 1644	Dean of Rochester; July 1660–December 1660	Succeeded by Nathaniel Hardy
Preceded by John Towers vacant from 1649	Bishop of Peterborough; 1660–1663	Succeeded by Joseph Henshaw
Preceded by Robert Sanderson	Bishop of Lincoln; 1663–1667	Succeeded by William Fuller
Preceded by Matthew Wren	Bishop of Ely; 1667–1675	Succeeded by Peter Gunning
