= List of compositions by Domenico Cimarosa =

The following is a list of the musical compositions of Domenico Cimarosa (1749–1801).

== Operas ==
- Le stravaganze del conte (carnival 1772 Naples Teatro San Giovanni dei Fiorentini) [Le magie di Merlina e Zoroastro; Le pazzie di Stelladaura e Zoroastro]
- La finta parigina (carnival 1773 Naples Teatro Nuovo)
- I sdegni per amore (1.1776 Naples Teatro Nuovo)
- I matrimoni in ballo (carnival 1776 Naples Teatro Nuovo)
- La frascatana nobile (winter 1776 Naples Teatro Nuovo) [La finta frascatana]
- I tre amanti (carnival 1777 Rome Teatro Valle) [Le gare degl'amanti]
- Il fanatico per gli antichi Romani (spring 1777 Naples Teatro San Giovanni dei Fiorentini)
- L'Armida immaginaria (summer 1777 Naples Teatro (San Giovanni) dei Fiorentini)
- Gli amanti comici, o sia La famiglia in scompiglio (1778? ?Naples Teatro (San Giovanni) dei Fiorentini; carnival 1796 Crema) [Il matrimonio in commedia; La famiglia stravagante, ovvero Gli amanti comici]
- Il ritorno di Don Calandrino (carnival 1778 Rome Teatro Valle) [Armidoro e Laurina]
- Le stravaganze d'amore (1778 Naples Teatro San Giovanni dei Fiorentini)
- Il matrimonio per industria (1778? Naples?) [?]
- La contessina (summer 1778 Bologna) [?] [+ G. Astaritta, F.L. Gassmann]
- Il matrimonio per raggiro (1778/9? Rome?; carnival 1802 Rome Teatro Valle) [La donna bizzarra]
- L'italiana in Londra (carnival 1779 Rome Teatro Valle) [La virtù premiata]
- L'infedeltà fedele (summer 1779 Naples, Teatro del Fondo)
- Le donne rivali (carnival 1780 Rome Teatro Valle) [et al.]
- Caio Mario (carnival 1780 Teatro delle Dame)
- I finti nobili (carnival 1780 Naples Teatro San Giovanni dei Fiorentini)
- Il falegname (1780 Naples F) [L'artista]
- L'avviso ai maritati (1780? ?Naples Teatro San Giovanni dei Fiorentini) [?]
- Il capriccio drammatico (1781? Turin?; 1794 London)
- Il pittor parigino (carnival 1781 Rome Teatro Valle) [Le brame deluse]
- Alessandro nell'Indie (carnival 1781 Rome A)
- Li sposi per accidente (Carnival 1781, Naples Teatro San Giovanni dei Fiorentini)
- L'amante combattuto dalle donne di Punto (1781 Naples Teatro San Giovanni dei Fiorentini) [La biondolina; La giardiniera fortunata]
- Giunio Bruto (aut.1781 Verona)G
- Giannina e Bernardone (aut.1781 Venice SS) [Il villano geloso]
- Il convito (carnival 1782 Venice SS) [Der Schmaus]
- L'amor costante (carnival 1782 Rome Teatro Valle) [Giulietta e Armidoro]
- L'eroe cinese (13.8.1782 Naples SC)
- La ballerina amante (1782 Naples Teatro San Giovanni dei Fiorentini) [L'amante ridicolo]
- La Circe (carnival 1783 Milan S)
- I due baroni di Rocca Azzurra (carnival 1783 Rome Teatro Valle) [Dve nevesty; I due baroni; La sposa in contrasto; Il barone deluso]
- La villana riconosciuta (1783 Naples Teatro del Fondo) [La villanella rapita]
- Oreste (13.8.1783 Naples SC)
- Chi dell'altrui si veste presto si spoglia (1783 Naples F) [Nina e Martuffo]
- Il vecchio burlato (1783 Venice) [?]
- I matrimoni impensati (carnival 1784 Rome Teatro Valle) [La bella greca]
- L'apparenza inganna, o sia La villeggiatura (spring 1784 Naples F)
- La vanità delusa (spring 1784 Florence P) [Il mercato di Malmantile]
- L'Olimpiade (10.7.1784 Vicenza)
- I due supposti conti, ossia Lo sposo senza moglie (aut.1784 Milan S) [Lo sposo ridicolo]
- Artaserse (26.12.1784 Turin TR)
- Il barone burlato (1784 Naples Teatro Nuovo) [rev. Il pittor parigino] [+ F. Cipolla]
- Li finti conti (spring 1785 Turin, Gallo-Ughetti) [?]
- I fratelli papamosche (spring 1785 Turin, Gallo-Ughetti) [?]
- Le statue parlanti (1785 Correggio) [?]
- Il marito disperato (1785 Naples F) [Il marito geloso; Die bestrafte Eifersucht]
- La donna sempre al suo peggior s'appiglia (1785 Naples Teatro Nuovo)
- Il credulo (carnival 1786 Naples Teatro Nuovo) [La baronessa stramba; Il credulo deluso]
- Le trame deluse (1786 Naples Teatro Nuovo) [L'amor contrastato; Li raggiri scoperti]
- L'impresario in angustie (1786 Naples Teatro Nuovo) [Die theatralischen Abenteuer]
- La baronessa stramba (1786 Naples Teatro Nuovo) [rev. I matrimoni in ballo] [Il credulo]
- Il Sagrifizio d’Abramo (1786)
- Gli amanti alla prova (1786 Naples) [?]
- L'impostore punito (1786/7 Turin C) [?]
- Volodimiro (carnival 1787 Turin TR)
- Il fanatico burlato (1787 Naples Teatro del Fondo) [La burla felice; Der adelsüchtige Bürger]
- La felicità inaspettata (3.1788 St Petersburg E)
- La vergine del sole (1788? ?St Petersburg E; 6.11.1789 St Petersburg BK)
- La scuffiara (1788) [?]
- La Cleopatra (27.9.1789 St Petersburg E) [Cleopatra e Marc'Antonio]
- Il matrimonio segreto (7.2.1792 Vienna B), score
- Sophie et Dorval () [rev. Il matrimonio segreto]
- Il matrimonio per susurro () [?]
- La calamità dei cuori (1792/3 Vienna B) [?]
- Contrattempi (1793 Bonn) [?]
- Amor rende sagace (1.4.1793 Vienna B)
- I traci amanti (19.6.1793 Naples Teatro Nuovo) [Il padre alla moda, ossia Lo Sbarco di Mustanzir Bassà; Gli turchi amanti; Les amants Turcs]
- Il maestro di cappella (2.7.1793 Berlin, Germany)
- Le astuzie femminili (26.8.1794 Naples Teatro (San Giovanni) dei Fiorentini)
- La pupilla astuta (1794 Naples Teatro del Fondo) [?]
- La serva innamorata (1794 Naples F) [?]
- Penelope (carnival 1795 Naples Teatro del Fondo)
- Le nozze in garbuglio (1795 Messina)
- L'impegno superato (1795 Naples Teatro del Fondo)
- La finta ammalata (1796 Lisbon)
- I nemici generosi (carnival 1796 Rome Teatro Valle) [Il duello per complimento]
- Gli Orazi e i Curiazi (carnival 1797 Venice F)
- La morte di Assalonne (? Florence, Oratorio) [rev. Gli Orazi ed i Curiazi]
- Achille all'assedio di Troja (carnival 1797 Rome A)
- L'imprudente fortunato (carnival 1797 Rome Teatro Valle)
- Artemisia regina di Caria (summer 1797 Naples SC)
- Attilio Regolo (carnival 1797 Reggio) [?]
- Le nozze di Lauretta (1797? Turin) [?]
- L'apprensivo raggirato (1798 Naples Teatro San Giovanni dei Fiorentini)
- Il secreto (aut.1798 Turin C)
- Semiramide (1799 Naples F) [?]
- Il conte di bell'amore () [?]
- L'arte contro l'arte (carnival 1800 Alexandria) [?]
- Artemisia (carnival 1801 Venice F)
- Il nuovo podestà (spring 1802 Bologna) [?]
- Tito Vespasiano (1821 Lisbon) [?]
- La discordia fortunata () [?]
- L'ajo nell'imbarazzo () [?]
- Le donne vendicate () [?]
- Il cavalier del dente () [?]
- La Molinara (incomplete) [?]

== Cantatas ==
- Atene Edificata (1788-06-29 St Petersburg Hermitage Theatre)
- Cantata per Ferdinando IV (1799)

== Oratorios ==
- Giuditta, Venice (?1782)
- Absalom (Absalon, actio sacra), Venice (1782); as Assalonne, Milan (1819)
- Il sacrificio d'Abramo Naples, Fondo (1786)
- Il trionfo delle fede, Naples (1794)
- Il martirio, Naples (1795)
- S Filippo Neri che risuscita Paolo Massimi, Rome (1797) [incl. music from Penelope, arr. P. Bonfichi]

== Other sacred works ==
- Mass in F for TTB (1765)
- Mass in F for SATB (1768)
- Mass in C for SATB (1772)
- Mass in D for SATB (?1776)
- Mass in G for SATB (1782)
- Missa pro defunctis in G minor for SATB, St Petersburg (1787)
- Mass in E for SATB (1796)
- Mass in C minor for SATB (1799)
- Messe brève in G for TTB
- Messe pour l'Avent et le Carême in G for SATB
- Magnificat for SATB (1769)
- Gloria patri for Soprano (1769)
- Te Deum for SATB (1798)
- Psalm XII for Soprano (1769)
- Laudate for Soprano (1769)
- Salve regina for Sop and Bass
- Litanie for SATB (1775)
- Domine for SATB (1782)
- Quoniam for Soprano (1770)
- Antra, ubis quaestus echo for Alto (1780)
- Pave coelum for Alto (1782)
- Memento Domine David for Bass
- Quasi leo for Bass (1782)

== Instrumental music ==
- 88 sonate for harpsichord or fortepiano
- Sinfonia in B major for 2 oboi, 2 corni e archi
- Sinfonia in D major (attributed to Josef Mysliveček)
- Concerto for harpsichord or fortepiano in si bemolle maggiore
- Concerto for Oboe and String Orchestra (arrangement by Arthur Benjamin based on music from the keyboard sonatas)
- Concerto per 2 flauti e orchestra in sol maggiore (1793)
- Sestetto in G major for fortepiano, fagotto, 2 violini, viola e violoncello
- Sestetto in F major for fortepiano organizzato, arpa, fagotto, violino, viola da gamba e violoncello
- 6 quartets (re maggiore, sol maggiore, do maggiore, fa maggiore, do maggiore, la minore) per flauto, violino, viola e violoncello
- Six Symphonies de Strážnice (Musée morave Brno)
- Hymn of the Partenopean Republic (Text (???) (1799)
- "Marcia da suonarsi sotto l'albero della libertà per il bruciamento delle immagini dei tiranni" (1799)

== Editions ==
- Stefano Faglia, Franca Saini (ed.): Il mercato di Malmantile, Florence, 1784. Monza, Accademia Musicale IAMR, 2012. Lucca, Libreria Musicale Italiana (LIM), 2012.
- Stefano Faglia, Franca Saini (ed.): Li due Baroni, Rome, 1783. Monza, Accademia Musicale IAMR, 2013. Lucca, Libreria Musicale Italiana (LIM), 2013.
