= 1772 in music =

== Events ==
- January 1 – "At length the fleeting Year is o'er", a setting by William Boyce of an ode by William Whitehead, receives its first public performance, at St James's Palace in London, England.
- January 2 – The funeral of Sigismund von Schrattenbach, Archbishop of Salzburg, is the occasion for the first performance of Michael Haydn's Missa pro defunctis Archespiscopo.
- March 13 – Florian Leopold Gassmann replaces Georg Reutter II as Hofkapellmeister to the court of Emperor Joseph II in Vienna.
- May 11 – A fire at the Theatre de la Monnaie in Brussels causes performances by Opéra flamand to be cancelled.
- June 5 – Carl Ditters von Dittersdorf is ennobled by Empress Maria Theresa.
- date unknown
  - Carl Stamitz is resident composer at Versailles.
  - Dr Charles Burney visits Johann Baptist Wanhal in Vienna.
  - Ignaz Pleyel becomes a pupil of Joseph Haydn.

== Classical music ==
- Johann Christian Bach – Symphonie Concertante in G C32
- Luigi Boccherini
  - 6 String Quintets, G.277-282 (Op.13)
  - 6 String Trios, G.95-100 (Op.14)
  - 6 String Quartets G. 177-182 (Op. 15)
  - 6 Cello Sonatas
- Christian Cannabich – Symphony No. 50 in D minor
- Giovanni Battista Cirri – 8 Duets for 2 Cellos, Op. 8
- Maria Rosa Coccia – 6 Harpsichord Sonatas, Op.1
- Giovanni Battista Costanzi – Cello Concerto in D major (originally attributed to J. Haydn as Hob.VIIb:4)
- Johann Christian Fischer – Oboe Concerto No.1 in C major
- Florian Leopold Gassmann
  - La Betulia Liberata (oratorio)
  - 6 Quintets, Op. 2
- François Joseph Gossec – Symphony 'de Chasse', RH 41
- Joseph Haydn
  - Baryton Trio No. 76 in C major, Hob.XI:76
  - Flötenuhr in C major, Hob.XIX:10
  - Flötenuhr in C major, Hob.XIX:16
  - Mass in G major, Hob.XXII:6
  - Symphony 44 "Trauer"
  - Symphony 45 "Farewell"
  - Symphony 46
  - Symphony 47 "Palindrome"
  - String Quartets, Op. 20
- Guillaume Lasceux – Magnificat in F major
- Gabriele Leone – 6 Duos pour deux violons qui peuvent se jouer sur la mandoline et sur le pardessus (6 Duets for two violins that can be played on the mandolin and on the descant viol)
- Andrea Luchesi – 6 Sonatas for harpsichord and violin Op. 1
- Wolfgang Amadeus Mozart
  - Grabmusik, K.42/35a
  - Church Sonata in E-flat major, K.67/41h
  - Kyrie in G major, K.89/73k
  - 20 Minuets, K.103/61d
  - Symphony No.15 in G major, K.124
  - Litaniae de venerabili altaris sacramento, K.125
  - Regina coeli in B-flat major, K.127
  - Symphonies 16-21, K. 128-130, 132-134
  - Divertimenti K. 136–138 "Salzburg Symphonies"
  - Wie unglücklich bin ich nit, K.147/125g
  - String Quartet No.2 in D major, K.155/134a
  - String Quartet No.4 in C major, K.157
  - 6 Minuets, K.164/130a
  - Die Mailänder Quartette K. Anh 210–213
- James Nares – 6 Fugues with Introductory Voluntary's for the Organ or Harpsichord
- Giovanni Paisiello – Requiem for Gennara di Borbone
- Stephen Paxton – 6 Solos for the cello, Op. 1
- Franz Xaver Richter – 6 String Quartets, Op. 5
- Giovanni Battista Sammartini – Symphony in A major, J-C 60
- Carl Stamitz – 6 Symphonies, Op. 9

== Opera ==
- Pasquale Anfossi –Alessandro nelle Indie
- Johann Christian Bach
  - Endimione
  - Temistocle
- Domenico Cimarosa – Le stravaganze del conte
- Wolfgang Amadeus Mozart
  - Il sogno di Scipione
  - Lucio Silla
- Giovanni Paisiello
  - La Semiramide in villa, R.1.31
  - La Dardané, R.1.33
  - Gli amanti comici, R.1.34
- Antonio Salieri
  - La secchia rapita
- Tommaso Traetta – Antigona

== Popular music ==
- Rev. William Leeves & Lady Anne Barnard – "Auld Robin Gray"

== Methods and theory writings ==
- Michel Corrette – Nouvelle méthode pour apprendre à jouer la Mandoline
- Louis-Joseph Francoeur – Diapason général de tous les instrumens à vent
- Raparlier – Principes de musique
- Johann Karl Gustav Wernich – Versuch einer richtigen Lehrart die Harfe zu spielen

== Births ==
- January 4 – Anton Friedrich Justus Thibaut, musician (died 1840)
- February 26 – Kaspar Fürstenau, flautist (died 1819)
- March 17 – Stephen Jenks, musician (died 1856)
- March 30 – Johann Wilhelm Wilms, composer (died 1847)
- April 1 – Ignaz Franz von Mosel, composer and conductor (died 1844)
- April 25 – Louis Deland, actor, singer and dancer (died 1823)
- May 1 – Jacques-Michel Hurel de Lamare, cellist (died 1823)
- May 2 – Friedrich von Hardenberg, librettist and poet (died 1801)
- June 10 – Greta Naterberg, folk singer (d. 1818)
- June 12 – Franz Cramer, violinist (died 1848)
- July 15 – Lucile Grétry, French composer (died 1790)
- August 26 – Maria Frances Parke, composer (died 1822)
- September 3 – Nicola Tacchinardi, cellist and operatic tenor (died 1859)
- September 27 – Antonio Casimir Cartellieri, Polish-Austrian composer (died 1807)
- October 4 – Francois-Louis Perne, composer (died 1832)
- November 10– Johann Nepomuk Kaňka, composer (died 1865)
- November 18 – Prince of Prussia Louis Ferdinand, composer and prince (died 1806)
- December 8 – Prince Joseph Franz Maximilian Lobkowitz, patron of Beethoven (died 1816)
- unknown date – Cyrill Demian, piano and organ maker (died 1847)

== Deaths ==
- February 13 – Pierre-Claude Foucquet, organist and harpsichordist (born 1694)
- March – Francesco Carattoli, operatic bass (born c. 1705)
- March 11 – Georg Reutter II, composer (born 1708)
- April 19 – Johann Peter Kellner, organist and composer (born 1705)
- April 22 – Marie Favart, opera singer, actress and dancer (born 1727)
- May 6 – Edmund Pascha, organist and composer (born 1714)
- June 15 – Claude Daquin, composer and organist (born 1694)
- August 21 – Alessandro Felici, Italian composer (born 1742)
- October 8 – Jean-Joseph de Mondonville, violinist and composer (born 1711)
- Panna Cinka, violinist (born 1711)
