= Wathen =

Wathen is a surname, and may refer to:

- Arthur Wathen (1841–1937), English cricketer
- Sir Charles Wathen Kt. (1833–1893) Wool Merchant, Clothier & six times Mayor of Bristol.
- Daniel Wathen, American lawyer and politician
- George Wathen (actor) (1762–1849), English actor, stage manager and theatre owner
- Heini Wathén (born 1955), Finnish model
- Jonathan Wathen (c. 1728 – 1808), English surgeon
- Sir Wathen Waller, 1st Baronet (1769–1853), English eye surgeon
- Richard Wathen (born 1971), British painter
- Richard B. Wathen (1917–2001), American politician, journalist, and author
- George Henry Wathen (1816–1879), geologist and South African politician
- Samuel Wathen (c. 1720 – 1787), English physician
