= The Vineyard Hotel =

They Vineyard Hotel may refer to:

- The Vineyard Hotel (Berkshire)
- The Vineyard Hotel (Cape Town)
