= Wathey =

Wathey is a surname. Notable people with the surname include:

- Andrew Wathey (born 1958), English academic
- Claude Wathey (1926–1998), politician from the Caribbean island of Sint Maarten

== See also ==
- Wathen
- Withey
