= Marianne Baillie =

English travel writer and poet (1795?-1831)

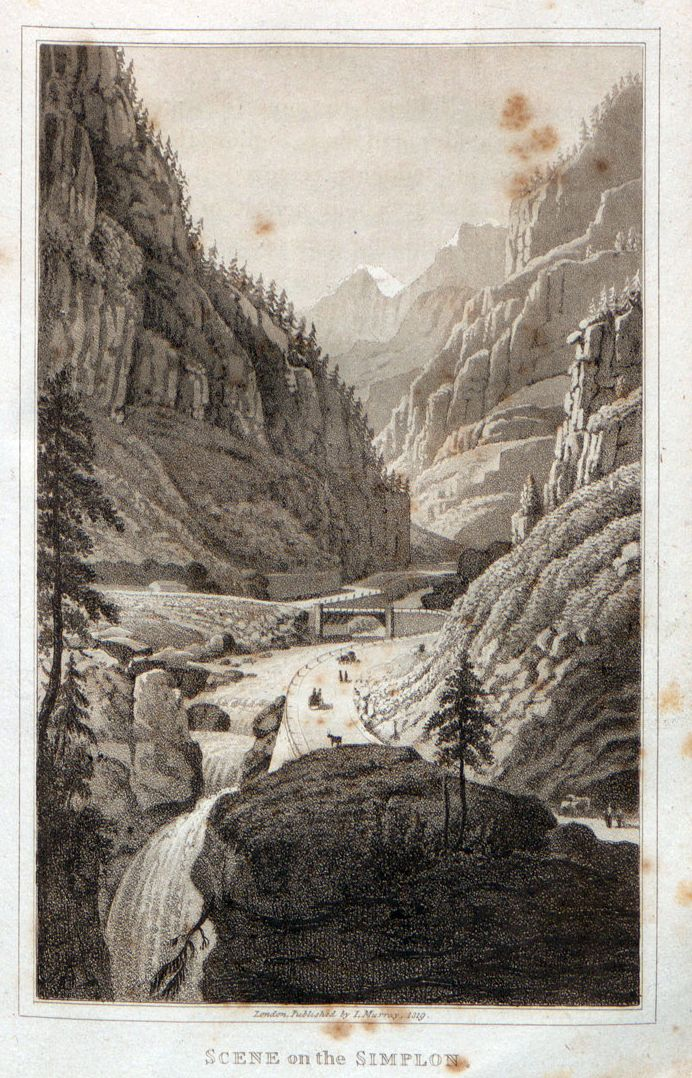
Scene on the Simplon, taken from her book First impressions on a tour upon the continent in the summer of 1818

Marianne Baillie (1788–1831) was an English traveller, poet and author of the 19th century, who wrote four books, two being collections of verse, and the others being descriptions of her travels in Europe.

== Biography ==
Marianne Baillie was born Marianne Wathen to the English actor George Wathen (1762–1849) and Marianne Norford, daughter of Dr. William Norford (1715–1793). She married Mr. Alexander Baillie "some years previous" to 1817. Her brother Augustus Wathen (1796–1844) married Elizabeth Jane Leslie, daughter of the Earl of Rothes.

Mrs. Baillie's first contribution to literature was a small volume, entitled Guy of Warwick, a Legende, and other Poems, Kingsbury, 1817. A very limited edition was printed by Mr. Baillie at his private printing-press, and, in 1818, a second edition was in demand. Some of the poems in this work were afterwards reproduced in a volume privately printed in London in 1825, and "not published", entitled Trifles in Verse. The preface is written by Mr. Baillie, who says that after the year 1817 "hard times came".

Early in 1818, the Baillies found a "shelter" and a "calm retreat" at Twickenham, where they received kindness from Lady Howe, whose second husband, Sir Wathen Waller, would seem to have been a relative of Mrs. Baillie. It was from Twickenham that the Baillies set out for a continental tour, crossing the Channel from Dover to Calais on 9 August 1818, and returning 8 October following. The literary result of this journey appeared in a volume inscribed by the author to the Right Hon. John Trevor, who had been British minister at Turin from 1783 to 1798; of whom Mrs. Baillie spoke after his death as a "paternal friend". The title of the volume was First Impressions on a Tour upon the Continent in the Summer of 1818, through Parts of France, Italy, Switzerland, the Borders of Germany, and a Part of French Flanders, 8vo, London, 1819. In the same year Mrs. Baillie wrote a poetical Farewell to Twickenham.

After spending some time in Devonshire, she entered in June 1820 upon a residence of about two years and a half in Portugal. There she wrote a series of letters to her mother, afterwards published, with an inscription to the Earl of Chichester, "to whose kindness they owe their existence," in two volumes, entitled Lisbon in the Years 1821, 1822, and 1823, 8vo, London, 1824; second edition 1825. Several of her poems, published first in her letters, and afterwards in Trifles in Verse, describe the beauties of Cintra. The Baillies returned to England in October 1823, and settled in London. Mrs. Baillie died in 1831.

== Works ==
- First impressions on a tour upon the continent in the summer of 1818, through parts of France, Italy, Switzerland, the borders of Germany, and a part of French Flanders. 1819.
- Lisbon in the years 1821, 1822, and 1823 (2nd ed.). J. Murray. 1825.
