= George Wathen (actor) =

English actor (1762–1849)

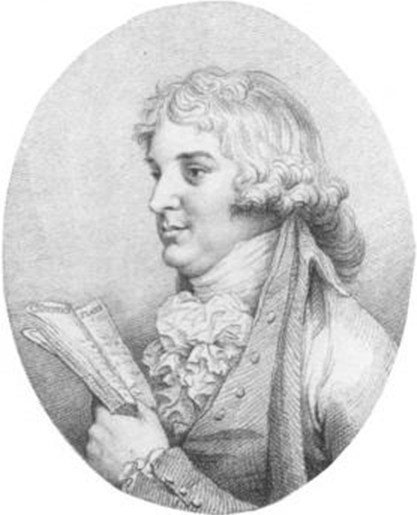
George Wathen by John Condé, 1792.

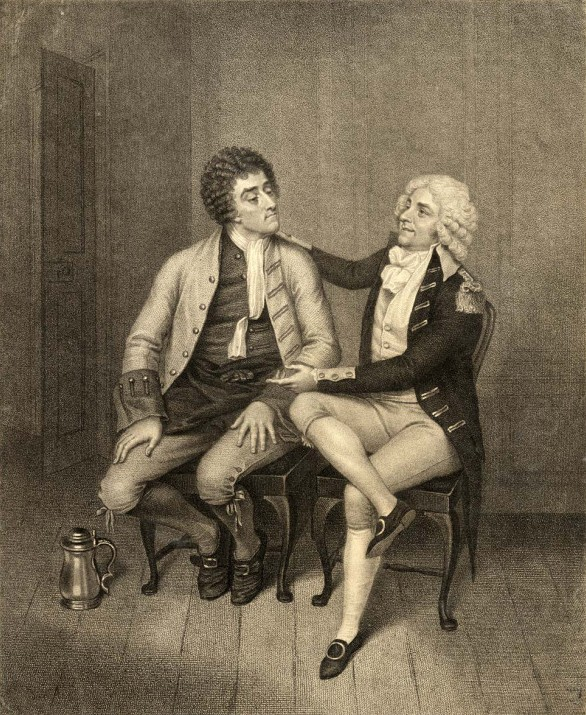
George Wathen as Archer with Richard Barrymore as stub in The Beaux' Stratagem by Philip Audinet, 1792.

George Wathen (1762–1849) was an English actor, stage manager and theatre owner who performed in London in the late 1700s and early 1800s. He was the father of the poet and author Marianne Baillie.

== Life and career ==
Wathen was born on 2 March 1762 in London to the well-known London physician Samuel Wathen and his wife Elizabeth Malthus, the aunt of Rev. Thomas Robert Malthus. He served with distinction as a junior army officer in the Siege of Gibraltar (1782), and then in Jamaica. He left the military, probably around 1789, with the rank of brevet Major, which meant that he left before the promotion had been finalized. He went on to become a well-known actor, singer and theatre manager, performing under the stage name of 'Captain Wathen', it is said to the derision of his fellow actors. Among his early acting partners was the famous Lord Barrymore (1769–1793). George's military career, together with his fame as an actor and stage manager, enabled him to receive an appointment in 1841 as a Military Knight of Windsor (i.e., an honorary body guard of the king) and presumably around this time he became 'Major Wathen'. He died on 21 April 1849, and was buried as Major Wathen in Windsor Castle.

== Family and children ==
Wathen married in 1787 Marianne Norford, the daughter of Dr. William Norford (1715–1793) of Bury St Edmunds in Suffolk, probably a physician friend of his father's. He and Marianne had four children.

- Marianne Wathen (1788–1831) was born on 13 Jul 1788 in Jamaica in the West Indies. She married Alexander Baillie, and as Marianne Baillie wrote four books, two being collections of verse, and the others being descriptions of her travels in Europe.
- George Samuel Wathen (b. 1790) appears to have died young.
- Augustus Wathen (1796–1844) was the only surviving son. He served at the Battle of Waterloo, and then in India, where he aroused the enmity of his commanding officer. His resulting court martial and subsequent acquittal as Captain Wathen in 1834, was a much chronicled military scandal. He was promoted to Major after the trial concluded, which results in confusion with his father as both appear in literature as Major Wathen. Prior to his service in India he married Elizabeth Jane Leslie, the daughter of the Earl of Rothe, and resided at Shrub Hill in Dorking, Surrey. He died while on his way from Norwich to visit his mother-in-law in Dorking on 3 May 1843, predeceasing his father. He was buried in his wife's family vault.
- Elizabeth Frances (1807–1871) baptised 28 Nov 1807 in Fetcham, Surrey. The only child to outlive her father, she was appointed sole executrix of his will.
