= Wathne =

Wathne is a Norwegian surname. Notable people with the surname include:

- Eli Wathne (born 1970), Norwegian politician
- Hugo Wathne (1932–2017), Norwegian sculptor and art instructor
- Sigurd Wathne (1898–1942), Norwegian footballer

== See also ==
- Wathen
