= James Ware (ophthalmologist) =

English eye surgeon (1756–1815)

James Ware FRS FSA
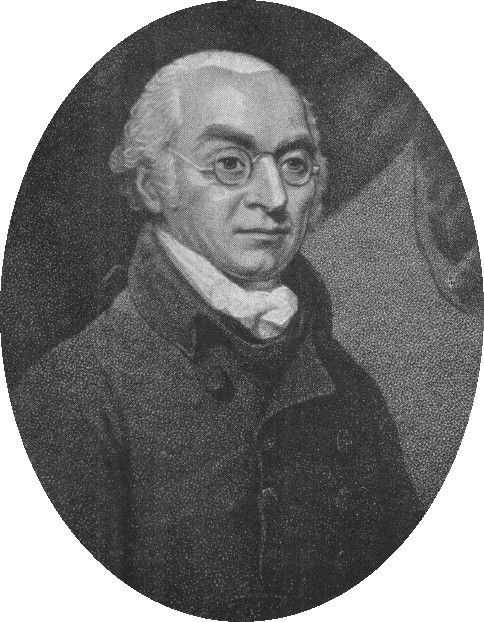
- portrait by Mather Brown
- Born: 11 February 1756; Portsmouth, Hampshire, England
- Died: 13 April 1815 (aged 59); Chiswick, London, England
- Occupation: Physician
- Years active: 1791–1815
- Known for: Eye surgeon

James Ware (1756–1815) was an English eye surgeon, and Fellow of the Royal Society, who practiced in London during the Georgian era. He is considered one of the founding fathers of modern ophthalmology in Britain.

== Life and career ==
Ware was born on 11 February 1756 in Portsmouth, England, to Martin Ware and Elizabeth Dale, Martin being the master shipbuilder at the royal dockyards of Sheerness, and later at Plymouth and Deptford. James received his primary education at the Portsmouth grammar school, after which he began a trial apprenticeship on 3 July 1770 to Dr. Ramsay Karr, the surgeon at the King's Yard in Portsmouth, ultimately being bound on 2 March 1771 to Karr as a full apprentice. During this period, he worked with surgeons at the Haslar Naval Hospital, assisting in treatments of the many accidents that were frequent occurrences in the shipyards. Upon conclusion of this apprenticeship, he enrolled as a student on 25 September 1773 at the St. Thomas' Hospital in London, where he remained for three years, making such remarkable progress that Dr. Joseph Else (d. 1780), the surgeon to the hospital, appointed Ware in 1776 as his Demonstrator of Anatomy in Else's medical classes.

Ware in London was fortunate enough to meet Jonathan Wathen (c. 1728 – 1808), a prominent London surgeon who specialized in diseases of the eye. This resulted in Ware becoming on 1 January 1777 Wathen's assistant, and then a junior partner on 25 March 1778 in Wathen's practice. This partnership, which is said to have been most beneficial to both men, continued until 1791, when Ware began his own practice at New Bridge Street in London, at which time Wathen took on his grandson Wathen Phipps (later Waller; 1789–1853) in Ware's place. Phipps went on to become the oculist of King George III, and later William IV, with Phipps subsequently being knighted as Jonathan Wathen Waller for that service. Wathen, Ware and Phipps/Waller were the three foremost eye doctors practicing in London during the latter part of the Georgian era, and they are credited with raising ophthalmology from a vocation of quacks and charlatans, rife with malpractice, into a legitimate branch of modern medical science.

Ware was one of the founders in 1788 of the London-based Society for the Relief of the Widows and Orphans of Medical Men, becoming in 1809 the society president. He was also one of the founders in 1800 of the School for the Indigent Blind, which was modeled after a similar institution established ten years earlier at Liverpool. He was elected on 18 January 1798 as a fellow of the Society of Antiquaries of London, probably being nominated by his old mentor Jonathan Wathen, who was also a fellow in the Society. Ware was also elected on 11 March 1802 as a Fellow of the Royal Society, being the first "oculist" so admitted, which greatly contributed to the recognition of ophthalmic surgery as a science.

Ware was married on 6 August 1787 to Ursula Maitland (1756–1836), who was the widow of Nathaniel Polhill, and the daughter of Robert Maitland. They had eight children, of whom six survived, including Martin Ware (1789–1872), who became an eye doctor, like his father, and later edited some of his father's works. Another son, John, was an eye doctor also, and for a while shared a practice with Martin. A third son, Rev. James Ware (1790–1855), was rector of Wyverstone. James Ware senior died on 13 April 1815 at the age of 59 at his country house at Turnham Green in Chiswick, London, and is buried in a family tomb at Bunhill Fields in London. This tomb today is a grade II British heritage listed building. There is a painting of Ware by Mather Brown that is engraved by Thomas Cook and appears in front of Pettigrew's (1839) biography of Ware. This same engraving also appears in an 1815 obituary in the New European Magazine.

== Publications ==
1. Remarks on the Ophthalmy, Psorophthalmy, and Purulent Eye, London, 1780. This work was reprinted several times, and translated into Spanish.
2. Chirurgical Observations relative to the Epiphora or Watery Eye, the Scrophulous and Intermittent Ophthalmy, the Extraction of the Cataract, and the Introduction of the Male Catheter, London, 1792.
3. An Enquiry into the Causes which have most commonly prevented Success in the Operation of Extracting the Cataract, London, 1795.
4. Chirurgical Observations relative to the Eye, London, 1798, 2 vols.
5. Remarks on the Fistula Lachrymalis (to which are added observations on hemorrhoids and additional remarks on the ophthalmy), London, 1798.
6. Remarks on the Purulent Ophthalmy which has lately been epidemical in this country, London, 1808.
7. Observations on the Treatment of the Epiphora, edited by his son, Martin Ware, London, 1818.
8. On an Operation of largely Puncturing the Capsule of the Crystalline Humour in Gutta Serena, London, 1812.
- He also published papers in the Transactions of the Medical and of the Medical and Chirurgical societies, of which the most interesting are said to be those that deal with the recovery of sight after long periods of blindness.
- In addition, he edited Reade's (1811) Practical Observations on Diseases of the Inner Corner of the Eye (London, 1811); and translated from French Wenzel's (1791) Treatise on Cataract.
