= L'impresario in angustie =

- Farsa by Domenico Cimarosa
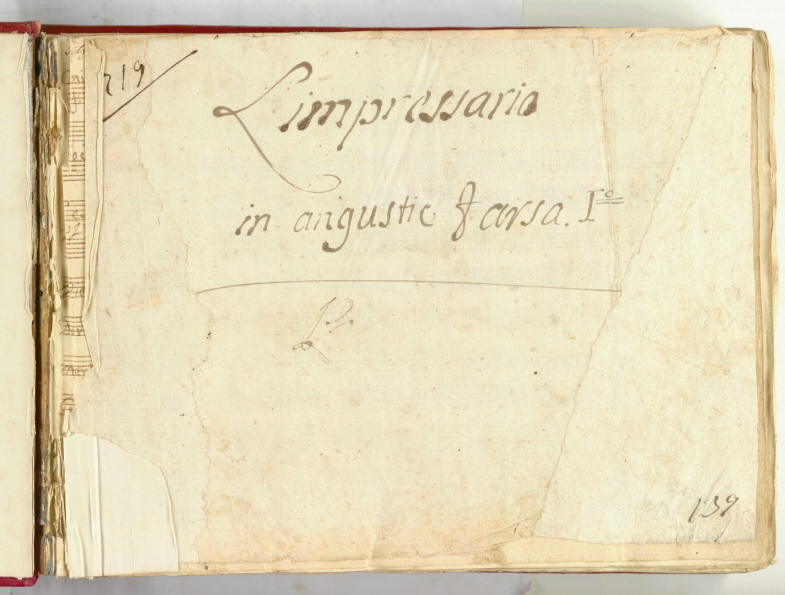
- Front page of a autographed score by Cimarosa
- Librettist: Giuseppe Maria Diodati
- Language: Italian
- Premiere: 1786; Teatro Nuovo, Naples

L'impresario in angustie is an operatic farsa in one act by composer Domenico Cimarosa with an Italian libretto by Giuseppe Maria Diodati. The opera premiered at the Teatro Nuovo in Naples, Italy in 1786.

The opera, often forgotten throughout the 19th century, regained popularity starting in the 1930s and was performed at the Teatro Regio in Turin and the Teatro alla Scala in Milan. Modern editions of this score were prepared in 1993 by Nick Rossi and Talmage Fauntleroy, and in 2006 by Simone Perugini on behalf of the Accademia Lirica Toscana "D. Cimarosa.".

== Roles ==
Role	Voice type	Premiere Cast, 1786 (Conductor: - )
Fiordispina	soprano	Marianna Limperani Santoro
Doralba	soprano	Orsola Mattei
Merlina	soprano	Caterina Fiorentini
Don Cristobolo	bass	Serafino Blasi
Don Perizonio Fattapane	bass	Gennaro Luzio
Gelindo Scagliozzi	tenor	Luigi Bruschi
Strabinio	bass	Alessandro Fontana

== Recordings ==
- L'impresario in angustie with conductor Fabio Maestri, the Associazione Sinfonica Umbra, and the Orchestra In Canto (November 1997).
- L'impresario in angustie with conductor Aldo Salvagno, the Orchestra Bruno Maderna di Forli (2018)
