= La finta parigina =

- Opera buffa by Domenico Cimarosa
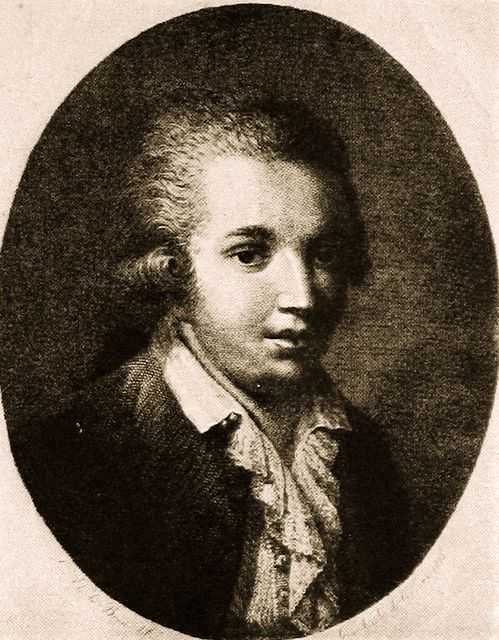
- The composer
- Librettist: Francesco Cerlone
- Language: Italian
- Premiere: 1773; Teatro Nuovo, Naples

La finta parigina (The false Parisienne) is an opera buffa in 3 acts by Domenico Cimarosa with an Italian libretto by Francesco Cerlone. The opera premiered at the Teatro Nuovo in Naples, in 1773.

== The opera ==
La finta parigina was composed for Carnival of 1773 and, although the exact date of the work's premiere is now unknown. It is the second of the sixty-eight operas that Cimarosa wrote and is written in the then popular style of Neapolitan opera buffa. The libretto uses Neapolitan dialect and praises Cimarosa's home town of Aversa, notably its mozzarella cheese and Asprina wine. most of the opera consists of solo numbers, with only a few brief duets and ensembles.

The opera relates the amorous misadventures of a group including the shopkeeper Cardillo (baritone), his sister Rosalina (soprano), the nobles Donna Olimpia (soprano) and Don Flaminio (alto), a Frenchman Monsiu Blò (tenor) and Donna Armida (soprano), the 'fake Parisienne'.

== Roles ==
Role	Voice type	Premiere Cast, Carnival 1773 (Conductor: - )
Donna Olimpia Onesti, Don Martino's wife who is supposedly dead	soprano	
Don Flaminio del Sole, a local dandy	tenor	
Mossiù Le Blò, a French doctor who is really a quack	tenor	
Don Martino Crespa, Donna Olimpia's supposedly widowed husband	baritone	
Donna Armida Gnoccolosa, engaged to Don Martino	soprano	
Cardillo, an innkeeper	baritone	
Malacarne, brother of Cardillo	bass	
Preziosa, a purveyor of cheese	soprano	
Rosolina, Cardillo's young sister	soubrette	

== Recordings ==
- La finta parigina with conductor Danilo Lombardini and the Orchestra Filarmonica Siciliana. Cast includes: Alessia Sparacio (Armida), Juan Gambina (Flaminio), Nunzio Galli (Le Blò), Alessandro Battiato (Martino), Anna Rita Gemmabella (Olimpia), Rosita Ramini (Preziosa), Alice Sunseri (Rosolina), Paolo Cutolo (Cardillo), and Giovanni Bellavia (Malacarne). Released on the Bongiovanni label in 1999.
