= L'Armida immaginaria =

- Dramma giocoso by Domenico Cimarosa
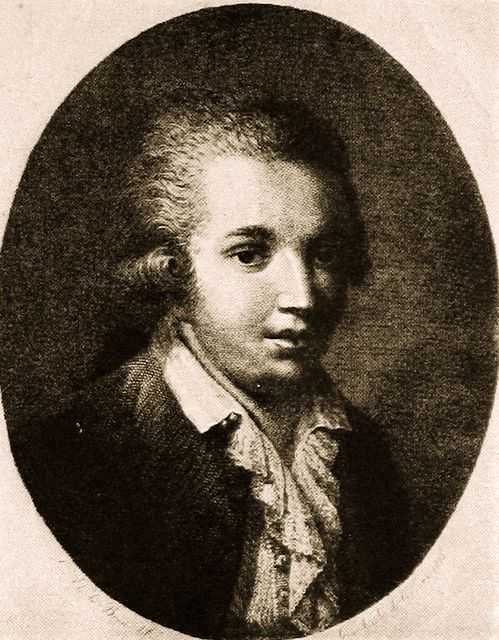
- The composer
- Librettist: Giuseppe Palomba
- Language: Italian
- Premiere: 1777; Teatro di Fiorentini, Naples

L'Armida immaginaria is a dramma giocoso in three acts by composer Domenico Cimarosa with an Italian libretto by Giuseppe Palomba. The opera was first performed in Naples during the summer of 1777 at the Teatro di Fiorentini.

== Roles ==
Roles	Voice type	Premiere Cast, Summer 1777 (Conductor: – )
Marchesina Tisbea	soprano	Anna Maria Benvenuti
Ermidora	soprano	Francesca Benvenuti
Stella	soprano	Maria Giuseppa Migliozzi
Masto Giorgio	baritone	Giuseppe Casaccia
Patro Caspero	tenor	Antonio Casaccia
Battistino	tenor	Nicola Zarlatti
Don Bernabo	baritone	Giovanni Beltrani

== Other operas named after the sorceress Armida ==
- Armida (Dvořák)
- Armida (Haydn)
- Armida (Rossini)
- Armida (Sacchini)
- Armida (Salieri)
- Armida (Weir)
- Armida abbandonata
- Armida al campo d'Egitto
- Armide (Gluck)
- Armide (Lully)
