= Sinfonia in B-flat major for two oboes, two horns and strings =

Sinfonia in B♭ major for two oboes, two horns and strings is one of several instrumental works by Domenico Cimarosa. The parts for this particular Sinfonia are located in the Zentralbibliothek in Solothurn, Switzerland. The instrumentation of this work was written perfectly for the orchestras in Naples which maintained two oboes, two trumpets (who doubled on horn), and strings.

Though there are few current recordings of the Sinfonia with 2 oboes, 2 horns, and strings, a similar version of the sinfonia written with a solo flute was recorded in 2009 as part of a project to record music from the private collection of Bertel Thorlvaldsen. The music from both pieces is almost the same except for the change in solo instruments.
