= Lady Anne Barnard =

Scottish travel writer, artist and socialite

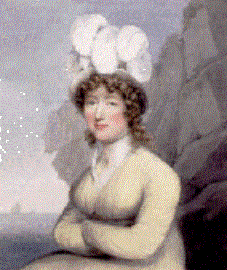
- Born: Lady Anne Lindsay; 12 December 1750; Balcarres House, Fife, Scotland
- Died: 6 May 1825 (aged 74); London, England
- Occupations: poet, visual artist
- Notable work: Auld Robin Gray
- Partner: Andrew Barnard

Lady Anne Barnard (née Lindsay; 8 December 1750 – 6 May 1825) was a Scottish travel writer, artist and socialite, and the author of the ballad Auld Robin Gray. Her five-year residence in Cape Town, South Africa, although brief, had a significant impact on the cultural and social life of the time.

== Early life ==
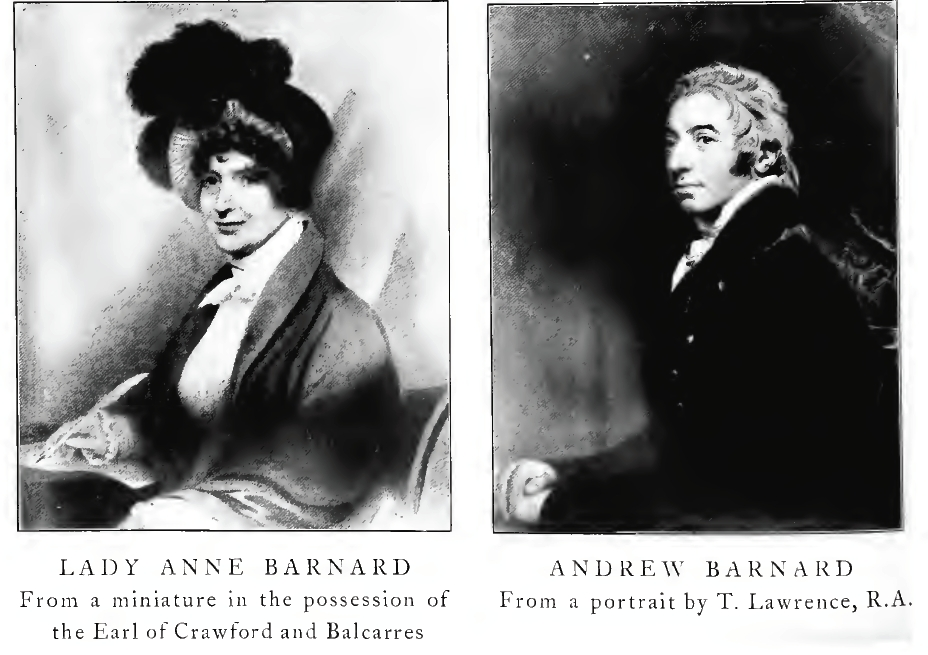
From Historic Houses of South Africa by Dorothea Fairbridge

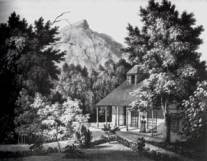
An example of a drawing, of "Paradise", her South African residence

Lady Anne Lindsay was born at Balcarres House in Fife, the first of nine children of Anne Lindsay (née Dalrymple) and James Lindsay, 5th Earl of Balcarres. Her mother arranged for Henrietta Cumming to be the governess to Anne and her sisters Margaret, and Elizabeth Lindsay. Anne later noted that Cumming was unusual. She refused to eat at all until she was allowed to eat with the family. She wanted to look after her charges and she was annoyed when she offered payment. Cumming (later Fordyce) served until the early 1780s.

In 1793, Anne moved to London, where she met and was married to Andrew Barnard, becoming Lady Anne Barnard. Her husband was twelve years her junior and the son of Thomas Barnard, Bishop of Limerick. She later obtained from Viscount Melville an appointment for him as colonial secretary at the Cape of Good Hope, which was then under British military occupation.

== Stay at the Cape ==
The Barnards travelled to the Cape in March 1797, Lady Anne remaining there until January 1802.

Her letters written to Melville, then secretary for war and the colonies, and her diaries of travels into the interior have become an important source of information about the people, events and social life of the time. She is also retained in popular memory as a socialite, known for entertaining at the Castle of Good Hope as the official hostess of Earl Macartney.

The remarkable series of letters, journals and drawings she produced was published in 1901 under the title South Africa a Century Ago.

== Later life ==
In 1806, on the reconquest of the Cape by the British, Andrew Barnard was reappointed colonial secretary, but Anne chose to remain in London rather than accompany him to the Cape. Andrew died there in 1807, and the remainder of Anne's life was passed in London, where she died at Berkeley Square on 6 May 1825.

== Other works ==
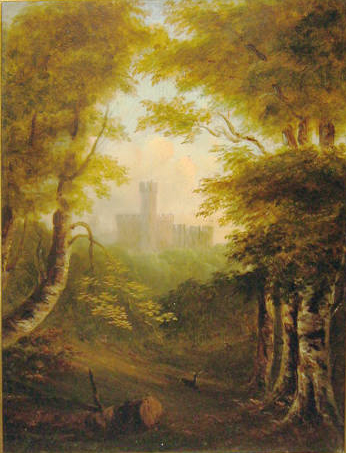
An example of her oil work, believed to depict Raby Castle in the County Palatine of Durham, seat of the Lords Barnard

Lady Anne was also an accomplished artist, some of her works being included in her published accounts of life in the 18th and 19th centuries. Her works include oil paintings and drawings.

The Rev. William Leeves revealed in 1812 that Auld Robin Gray had been written by her in 1772 and set to music by him. It was published anonymously in 1783, Lady Anne only acknowledging the authorship of the words two years before her death in a letter to Sir Walter Scott (1823), who subsequently edited it for the Bannatyne Club with two continuations. According to the Biographical Dictionary of Scottish Women, Lindsay's song began as a song sung by Sophia Johnston of Hilton .

American composer Florence Turner-Maley used text by Lady Anne for her song "In a Garden Wild", published in 1921.

== Legacy ==
Lady Anne is commemorated in several ways in Cape Town. A chamber in the Castle of Good Hope is known as "Lady Anne Barnard's Ballroom"; a road in the suburb of Newlands, where the Barnards lived, is named "Lady Anne Avenue" and a carved sculpture of her is displayed in the foyer of the civic centre in the neighbouring suburb of Claremont. The Barnards' country house, The Vineyard, survives as part of a hotel.
