= Samuel Wathen =

English physician

Samuel Wathen, M.D. (c. 1720–1787) was an English physician who practised in London during the Georgian era. He acted as personal physician to Rev. John Wesley, and may also have served Queen Charlotte of England as a male midwife.

== Life and career ==
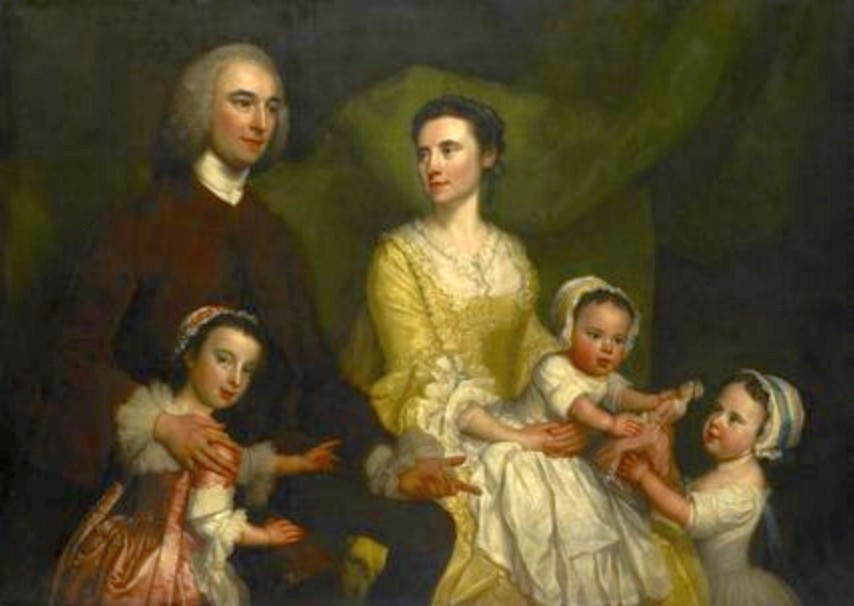
Dr. Samuel Wathen with his wife and children by George Knapton, 1755.

Samuel Wathen was born in 1719 or 1720, most probably in Stroud, Gloucestershire, to Jonathan Wathen, a wealthy clothier of Stroud, and his wife Sarah Watkins. He became a physician, and then as a young man in Bristol in 1737, he met the Rev. John Wesley, one of the founders of Methodism. He ultimately became Wesley's personal physician, and there are several mentions of Wathen in Wesley's journal. He was the elder brother of Jonathan Wathen (c. 1728 – 1808), a well-known London surgeon.

Wathen was admitted to the King's College in Aberdeen, Scotland, on the recommendation of Dr. Nicholas Munckley (c. 1721–1770), a physician at Guy's Hospital in London and a member of the Royal Society. He graduated as a doctor of medicine on 28 September 1752 and was admitted to the Royal College of Physicians on 30 September 1756, going on to become one of London's best-known physicians. In addition to being a surgeon and John Wesley's personal physician, he was also one of the physicians of the City of London Lying-in Hospital on City Road where he was a man-midwife extraordinary. He was also listed on the Royal Kalendar of 1766 as man-midwife to the Queen, which must have been Charlotte, wife of George III, and makes it likely that he attended the Queen when her sons, the future George IV and William IV were born.

Wathen ultimately retired from London to Dorking, Surrey, where his son-in-law, John Eckersall, owned Burford Hall. He moved later to Wrington, Somersetshire, where another son-in-law, Rev. William Leeves, was rector of All Saints Church. He died on 26 July 1787 at Wrington. There is a painting of Samuel Wathen with his family by the artist George Knapton in the collections of the Birmingham Museum and Art Gallery.

== Family ==
Wathen was married three times, his third wife being Elizabeth Malthus, whom he married on 19 March 1750 at St Mary-at-Hill, London. She was the daughter of Sydenham Malthus (c. 1678–1757), a barrister, but she is best known as the aunt of the economist Rev. Thomas Robert Malthus (1766–1834), who was one of the first to write on the dangers of mankind overpopulating the earth. Samuel had one daughter from his second marriage, and at least five children from his third, including the actor George Wathen (1762–1849), who was well known on the London stage as "Captain Wathen". Samuel and Elizabeth were the grandparents of the poet Marianne Baillie.
