= La Cleopatra (Cimarosa) =

- Opera seria by Domenico Cimarosa
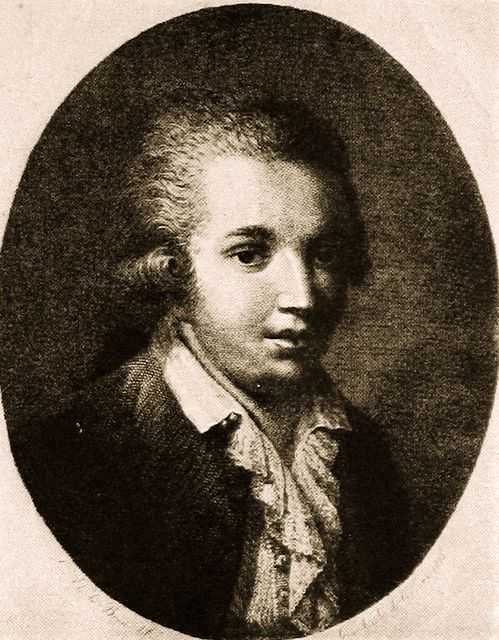
- The composer
- Librettist: Ferdinando Moretti
- Language: Italian
- Premiere: 7 February 1789; Theater Eremitage, Saint Petersburg

La Cleopatra (1789) is an opera seria in two acts by composer Domenico Cimarosa with an Italian libretto by Ferdinando Moretti.

== Historical background and musical analysis ==
La Cleopatra was commissioned by Empress Catherine II of Russia in 1788. Cimarosa and Moretti were instructed to keep the opera short and give it a relatively simple plot. As a result, the opera is about a hundred minutes in length which is short for an opera of that period and time. The plot is also very straightforward, lacking the typical plot twists and intrigues of other opera serias of the day. Musically the opera is made up of mostly arias with only a few duets, a quartet, a ballet, and a march. Although music critics have admired the duet at the end of act one, the ballet music, and the final quartet, the opera as a whole is not considered particularly remarkable. The work premiered at the Hermitage Theatre in Saint Petersburg, Russia, on 27 September 1789.

== Roles ==
Roles, voice types, premiere cast
Role	Voice type	Premiere cast, 27 September 1789
Cleopatra	coloratura soprano	Anna Pozzi
Antonio	castrato	Domenico Bruni
Domizio	tenor	Gugliemo Jermoli
Arsinoe	soprano	Marianna Gattoni

== Recordings ==
- La Cleopatra with conductor Franco Piva and the Orchestra e Coro Città di Adria. Cast includes: Luisa Giannini (Cleopatra), Patrizia Morandini (Antonio), Luca Favaron (Domizio), and Maria Pia Moriyòn (Arsinoe). Released in 1996 on Bongiovanni GB label.

== Sources ==
- Holograph Score: Library of Music Conservatory "San Pietro a Majella", Naples, Shelfmark: 13.2.11-12.
- Original 1789 printed libretto: Rossiyskaya Natsional'naya Biblioteka, Saint Petersburg, Shelfmark: 13.16,2,4.
