= Jonathan Wathen =

Jonathan Wathen (c. 1728 – 1807) was an English surgeon, who specialized in diseases of the eye and practiced in London during the Georgian era. He was teacher and mentor to the ophthalmologist James Ware and Sir Wathen Waller, the oculist to George III.

== Life and career ==
Jonathan Wathen was born in 1727 or 1728, most likely in Stroud, Gloucestershire, to Jonathan Wathen, a wealthy clothier of Stroud, and his wife Sarah Watkins. He apprenticed about 1745 under his older brother, Samuel Wathen M.D., a well-known London physician whose patients included the Rev. John Wesley and Queen Charlotte, the wife of George III. Their association lasted ten years or more, and it is likely that at some point Jonathan graduated from apprentice to partner. Samuel's practice in 1751 was located at Devonshire Square in London, and Jonathan is listed in 1755 at the same address as well. The two also practiced side by side for many years at the City of London Lying-in Hospital, and later they practiced together at the Magdalen Hospital as well.

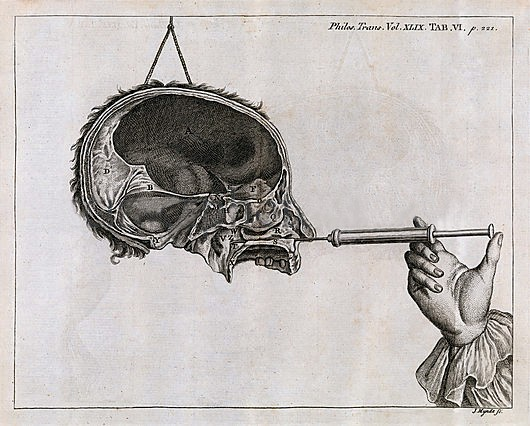
Illustration from Wathen's paper in Transactions of the Royal Society

Jonathan presented a paper in 1755 to the Royal Society on a method of restoring hearing by using a catheter to clear a blocked eustachian tube (i.e., the canal that runs from the nose to the ear). Although he made this presentation to the Society, he was never admitted there as a Fellow. However, he was elected a Fellow to the Society of Antiquaries of London. Eventually, Jonathan and his brother established separate practices, with Jonathan ending up at Bond-court, in Walbrook, London, and Samuel at Great Cumberland Street in St. Marylebone. In addition, Jonathan became a surgeon in 1770 at the London Magdalen Hospital, which was an institution to rehabilitate prostitutes, and this may have been an extension of his earlier work at the Lying-in Hospital. Presumably he carried on his duties at these institutions in conjunction with his private practice.

Jonathan married Anne Waller, the widow of John Allen, on 8 June 1761 at St Botolph-without-Bishopsgate in London. Although he never had children of his own, Anne did have one daughter Mary Allen from her previous marriage. When this daughter in 1764 wed Joshua Phipps, Wathen signed the church record as witness, and he is often listed as the grandfather of Mary's only son, Jonathan Wathen Phipps (born 1769), whereas he is in fact the step-grandfather.

Although Jonathan Wathen never received any formal medical training, he did publish, and became very well known. He always referred to himself in his publications as a surgeon, but he specialized in diseases of the eye and throat, and he is sometimes even referred to as one of the founding fathers of ophthalmology in England. However, that term is probably more appropriate for a college-trained physician named James Ware (1756-1815), who Jonathan took on as an assistant in 1777 when he was at Bond-court. The next year the two entered into a formal partnership, with Ware holding a one-fourth interest, that lasted until 1791 when Ware started his own practice. Although Ware ultimately became the better known of the two, and was even admitted as a Fellow to the Royal Society, he acknowledged in print his debt to his mentor and former partner Jonathan Wathen.

When Wathen and Ware parted company, Jonathan took on his step-grandson Wathen Phipps in 1791 as an apprentice. Phipps went on in 1795 to become the eye doctor for King George III, and later changed his last name to Waller. Wathen continued to practice, having achieved renown equal to that of his deceased brother Samuel (died 1787), and died on 17 January 1808 at East Acton, London (Middlesex) in his 80th year.

== Publications ==
A partial list.

- "A Method Proposed to Restore Hearing when Injured from an Obstruction of the Tuba Eustachiana", in Philosophical Transactions of the Royal Society, v. 49 (1756), pp. 213–222. Read to the Royal Society on 29 May 1755.
- Boerhaave's Academical lectures on the lues venerea. In which are accurately described, the history, origin, progress, causes, symptoms, and cure of that disease. Translated from the Latin, with notes, by Jonathan Wathen, surgeon, (1763), J. Rivington, London.
- Practical observations concerning the cure of the venereal disease by mercurials, (1765), J. Rivington, and C. Henderson, London.
- A dissertation on the theory and cure of the cataract: in which the practice of extraction is supported; and that operation, in its present improved state, is particularly described, (1785), T. Cadell and C. Dilly, London, 166 p.
- A new and easy method of curing the fistula lacrymalis: the second edition, with considerable improvements. To which is added, a dissertation on the epiphora vera; or, true watery eye: and the zeropthalmia; or, dry eye. Also, an appendix on the treatment of patients after the operation for the cataract: in which are shewn the evils attendant on long confinement and continued bandages: and an opposite practice recommended. Illustrated with cases, (1792), C. Dilly, London, 104 p.
