= Auld Robin Gray =

1772 ballad

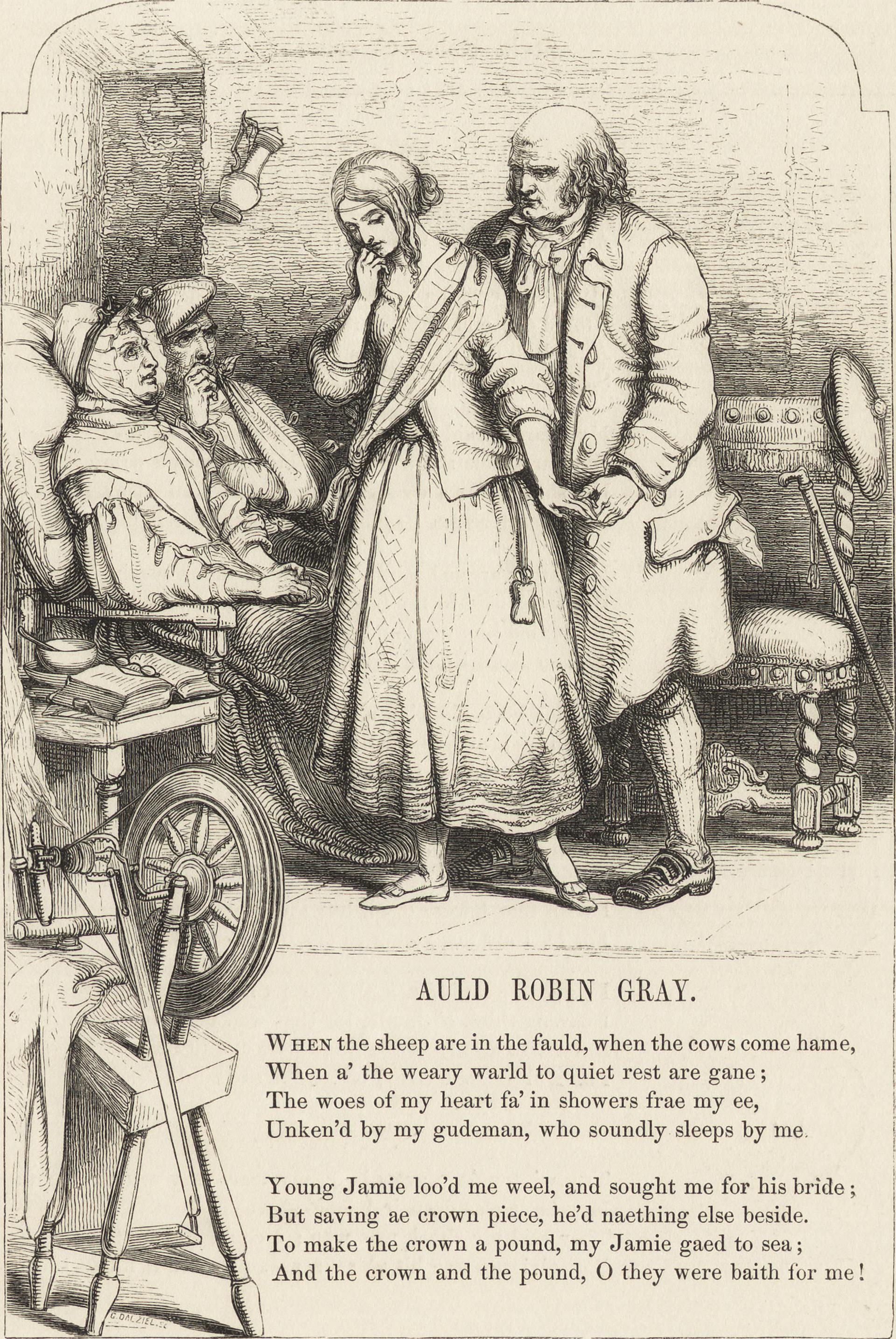
Auld Robin Gray from The Book of British Ballads (1842)

Auld Robin Gray is the title of a Scots ballad written by the Scottish poet Lady Anne Lindsay in 1772. According to the Biographical Dictionary of Scottish Women, Lindsay's song began as a song sung by Sophia Johnston of Hilton.

Robin Gray is a good old man who marries a young woman already in love with a man named Jamie. Jamie goes away to sea in order to earn money so that the couple can marry. The woman, who narrates the ballad, tells the story of being compelled by her parents' misfortune to marry Robin Gray while her lover is away. Robin promises to maintain her and her parents in return for her hand. Jamie returns a few weeks after the marriage, looking like a ghost. They have a sad reunion, kiss and tear themselves away from each other. The woman resolves to do her best to be a good wife to Robin, though she is extremely sad at the loss of her true love.

The original tune was composed by the Rev. William Leeves. George Thomson commissioned Joseph Haydn to arrange the ballad for piano and soprano, as well as for piano, violin, cello, and soprano. Twentieth century American composer Marjorie Rusche, among others, has also arranged “Auld Robin Gray.”

== Popular use ==
The poem is sung by the "lovely maniac" (88) in Mary Wollstonecraft's novel Maria (1798). There are echoes of the theme of abandoned women throughout the novel.

The short story "Young Robin Gray" (1894) by Bret Harte alludes to this song but revises the relationships between characters so that the Scottish heroine's virtue is redeemed. In Harte's story, the woman remains faithful to her betrothed, also named Jamie, until he breaks their engagement. She marries for love, not money. An explicit reference to the song occurs in chapter two, during a discussion of nicknames. Wealthy American Robert Gray observes that he would be called Robin Gray in Scotland, and in the brief exchange that follows, another character insists that Robin Gray in the song is "Auld Robin Gray" (381).
