= John Condé =

John Condé (fl. 1785-1800), was an engraver.

Conde is sometimes called an Englishman, but on an engraving published in 1791, representing the Chevalier d'Eon de Beaumont as Minerva, he styles himself a French artist, "who designed it for a monument of English generosity and French gratitude". Condé is well known from the number of engravings he executed from the elegant portraits drawn by Richard Cosway. These he engraved in pale delicate tints, using stipple, sanguine, or aquatint, and sometimes enhanced their elegance by enclosing them in framelike borders, called "glomisages" from the French engraver Glomy, who first designed them.

Among the portraits thus engraved were Maria Fitzherbert, Mrs. Tickell, Mrs. Bouverie, Madame du Barry, Horace Beckford, and others. He engraved portraits of celebrities for the European and other magazines, and also portraits of actors after De Wilde, or from the life, for the Thespian Magazine. Among other works of his may be noticed a portrait of Lord Chancellor Thurlow, after S. Collings, and a print called "The Hobby Horse", from his own design. He was doubtless father of Peter Condé, who engraved portraits of Jan Ladislav Dussek and Caleb Whitefoord, after Cosway, and also painted portraits, exhibiting at the Royal Academy from 1806 to 1824.

== Sources ==
"Condé, John" . Dictionary of National Biography. London: Smith, Elder & Co. 1885–1900.
