= L'Italiana in Londra =

Comic opera by Domenico Cimarosa

- Intermezzo by Domenico Cimarosa
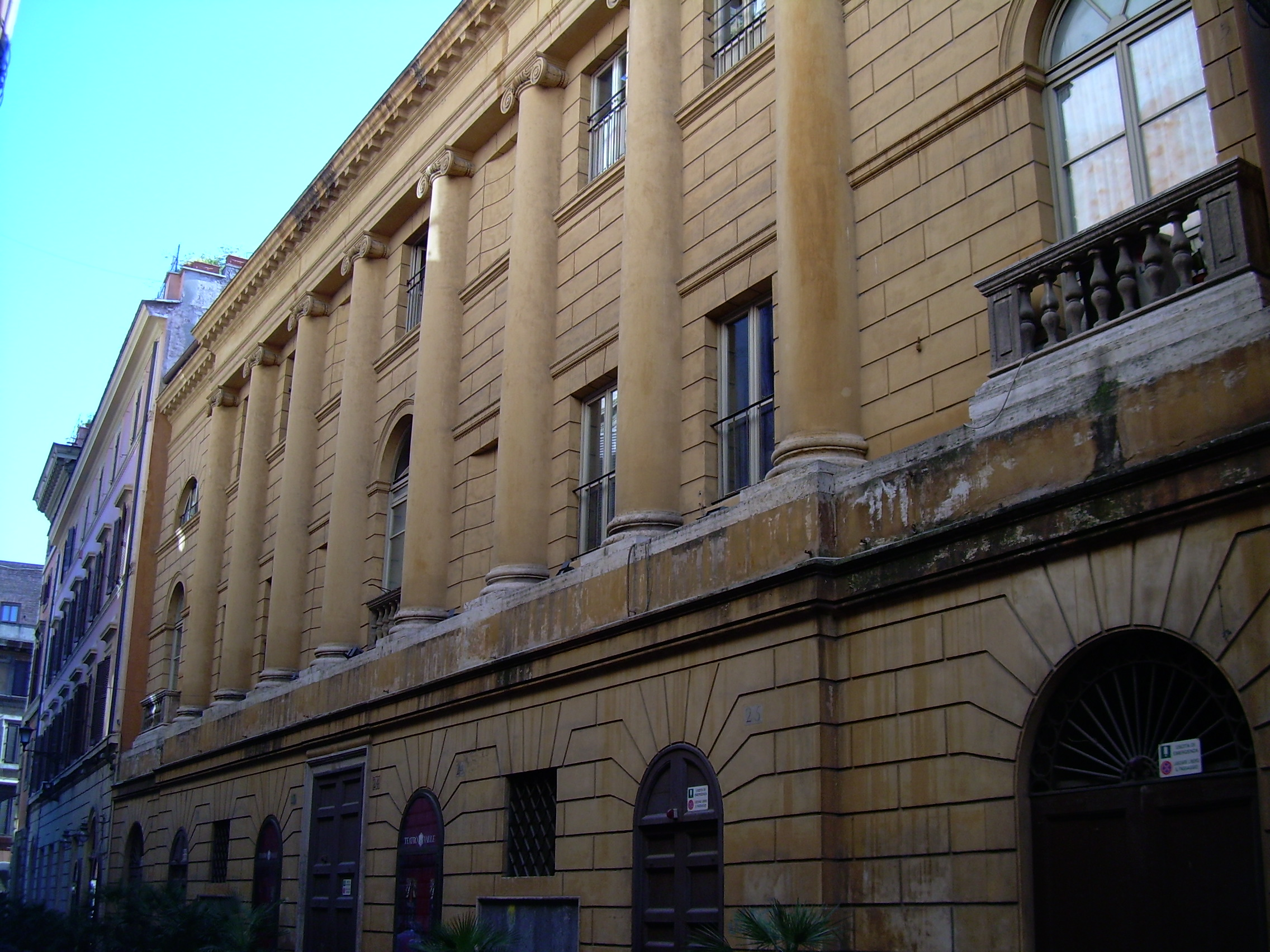
- Teatro Valle in Rome
- Translation: The Italian Girl in London
- Librettist: Giuseppe Petrosellini
- Language: Italian
- Premiere: 1778; Teatro Valle, Rome

L'Italiana in Londra (The Italian Girl in London) is one of eight comic operas, termed intermezzi, which Domenico Cimarosa wrote between 1777 and 1784 for the Teatro Valle, a handsome neo-classical Roman theatre built in 1726, which still stands today.

== History ==
Intermezzi grew out of small-scale comic pieces which were inserted for light relief between the acts of weightier opera seria works, chiefly in Naples and Venice. They usually had only two singers, perhaps with the addition of actors. Typically characters were drawn from what was supposed to be real life, but servants were often pitted against their betters with a fair sprinkling of satire. Cimarosa's Roman intermezzi, which established his reputation, were two-act operas, in contrast to the usual three-act form of the opera buffa, and were carefully tailored to the modest forces available at the Teatro Valle.

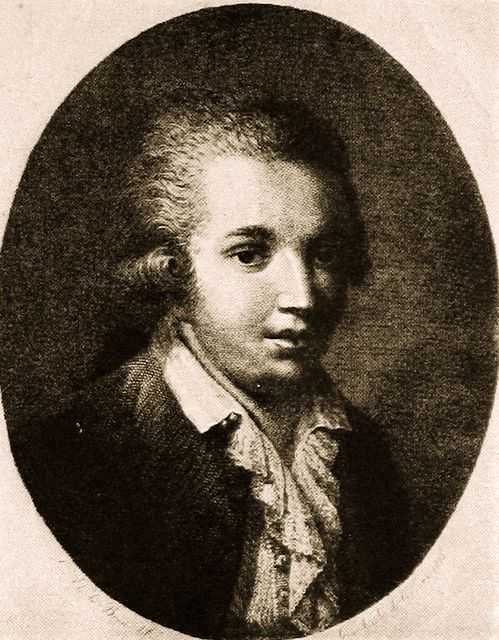
Domenico Cimarosa

L'Italiana in Londra was Cimarosa's fourth collaboration with the comic specialist librettist, the Roman abbot Giuseppe Petrosellini (1727–after 1797), whose work with many of the most successful composers of his day, including Piccinni, Anfossi, Salieri and probably Mozart, for whom he is supposed to have provided the libretto for La finta giardiniera, was later to culminate in Il barbiere di Siviglia for Paisiello in 1782. As with other significant librettists of the day, Petrosellini developed a genre which had been established by Goldoni, moving away from the tradition of repetitive sequences of arias so that the dramatic texture is more naturally broken up with ensembles and expanded finales. It was this latter feature which Cimarosa was to make especially effective in his comic operas and the two lengthy multi-part finales are one of the most appealing features of L'italiana. Petrosellini was adept at inventing attractive comic situations, frequently involving disguise, and he had a sure sense of pace and stagecraft.

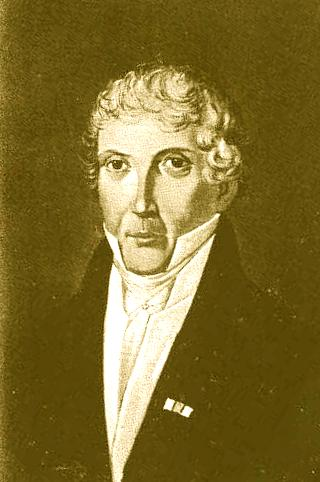
Girolamo Crescentini (1762–1846)

Cimarosa himself directed the première of The Italian Girl in London in 1778 from the harpsichord and it was by far his greatest success to date. Papal edict forbade the appearance of women on the stage, so Livia was played by the 17-year-old male castrato Crescentini (whose later career was so illustrious that he was granted the Iron Crown of Lombardy by Napoleon), and Madama Brillante by Giuseppe Censi.

Soon afterwards, this was the first of Cimarosa's operas to be presented at La Scala, Milan, to be followed by performances at the Teatro Regio in Turin and La Fenice, Venice. In the 1780s it became one of the most travelled of all operas of its era, with performances in (amongst others) Dresden, Graz, Vienna, Prague, Warsaw, St Petersburg, Barcelona, Madrid, Lisbon, Cologne, Weimar, Hanover, Hamburg, Versailles, Paris, Aachen, Ghent and London. Translations were made into French, German, Polish, Danish and Russian. When the opera was performed in London in 1788 (as La locandiera), The Post considered that although the music was "light and airy" there "was nothing of striking or prolific imagination", although The World considered the music "at once very ingenious and very gay".

As with most touring operas at this time, adjustments were made to the score to suit local conditions, singers and tastes. Cimarosa himself added some new music for a revival in Naples in 1794 but refrained from further alterations "because this opera has always been well-received in places where it had played". However, when it was given abroad, the composer had no effective control, and revisions and interpolations were made by Cherubini, Haydn (who gave fourteen performances at Eszterháza) and Paer. Nevertheless, its unprecedented success did not survive the changes in the comic genre effected by Rossini and Donizetti, and L'italiana in Londra disappeared from the stage until its first modern revival at Geneva in 1929. The preparation of a score and performing materials by the publishing house Ricordi in 1979 has helped to promote it since.

In 1989 the Buxton Festival gave the first modern times production of the opera in the UK (not strictly the "British Première" as the programme claimed) in a new translation by Amanda Holden, conducted by Anthony Hose and directed by Jamie Hayes, with a late 19th-century setting. Bampton Classical Opera performed the opera in 2011, in English.

A recording on 2 CDs issued in 2026 was based on a 2021 staging in Frankfurt conducted by Leo Hussain.

== Roles ==
Roles, voice types, premiere cast
Role	Voice type	Premiere cast, 1778 Conductor: Domenico Cimarosa
Madama Brillante	mezzo-soprano	
Arespingh	tenor	
Sumers	tenor	
Don Polidoro	baritone	
Livia	soprano	Girolamo Crescentini

== Plot ==
Staying in a London hostelry run by Madama Brillante are:

- a morose English Milord with the unlikely name of Arespingh
- a middle-class and eminently sensible Dutch merchant, Sumers
- a flamboyant, gullible and homesick Neapolitan, Don Polidoro.

The Italian girl is Livia, who comes from Genoa but claims to be from Marseilles. She has been jilted by Arespingh who is being forced by his father to marry someone else. Meanwhile, Madama Brillante has designs on Polidoro, but Polidoro fancies Livia. The action unfolds through a single day of arguments and misunderstandings, but all is happily resolved by the end.

Part of the plot concerns a magic heliotrope or bloodstone which makes a person invisible, a story Petrosellini derived from a chapter of Boccaccio's Decameron.
