= The Vineyard Hotel (Cape Town) =

Coordinates: 33.97894614068857°S 18.458560877420705°E

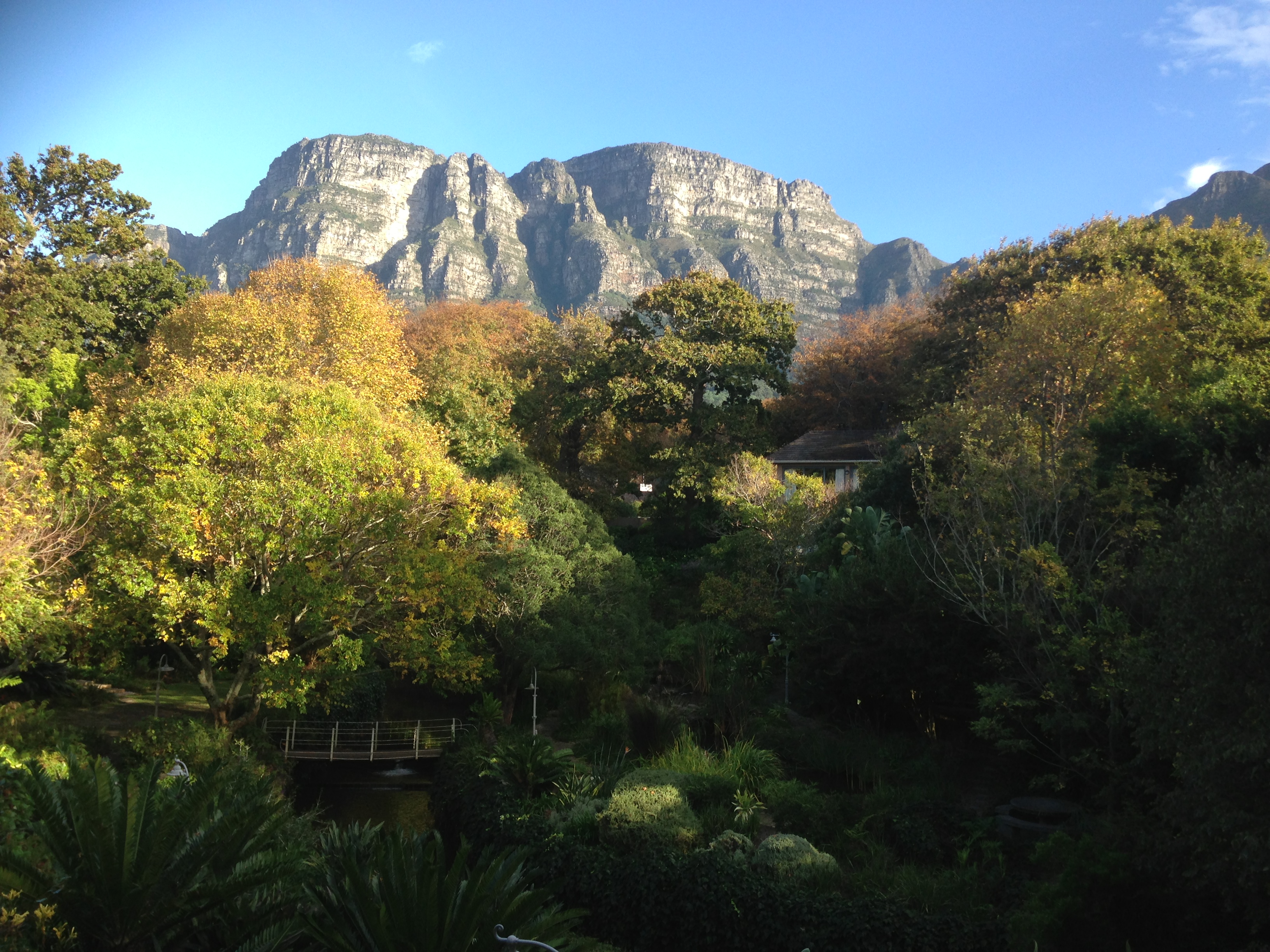
A view of the gardens at the Vineyard Hotel with Table Mountain in the background.

The Vineyard is a 175 room hotel, restaurant and spa located in the suburb of Newlands, Cape Town in South Africa. The hotel is family owned by the Petousis family.

The original build was constructed in February 1800 and was once the home of the Scottish writer and socialite Lady Anne Barnard and was the first English style house in the Cape Colony. Its gardens feature a notably wide selection of indigenous and exotic flora and forna.

It was acquired by the Scottish banker James Mitchell in 1894 and converted into a hotel. The English writer Rudyard Kipling stayed at the hotel for significant period during his 1898 visit to the Cape Colony and wrote about his stay noting its gardens and views of nearby Table Mountain. In 1948 the hotel was bought by the Turkstra family who installed its well known fountain and was sold on again in 1980 to the Petousis family.

The building and its grounds was declared a national monument on 18 February 1977.
