= William Leeves =

Poet and composer (1748–1828)

William Leeves (1748–1828) was a poet, composer, and clergyman. He wrote the tune for the Scots ballad 'Auld Robin Gray'.

The son of Henry Leeves, esq. of Kensington, he was born on 11 June 1748. He entered the First Regiment of Foot-Guards as ensign on 20 June 1769, and was promoted lieutenant on 23 Feb. 1772. In 1779 he decided to take holy orders, and was appointed to the living of Wrington in Somerset, the birthplace of John Locke and the abode of Hannah More, at whose house he was a frequent and welcome visitor. Leeves continued rector of Wrington until his death there on 28 May 1828. A portrait of him in his lieutenant's uniform was painted in 1773, and this was engraved for Mrs. Moon's Memoir. He married on 4 May 1786, Anne, youngest daughter of Samuel Wathen, M.D. She was possessed of great musical talent, and was a skilful performer on the violin. Their eldest son, William Henry, had a splendid bass voice. Another son, Henry Daniel, was in holy orders, and was chiefly instrumental in the erection of the English church at Athens. George was in the navy, on retiring from which he settled in America. Marianne married the Rev. Robinson Elsdale, son of Robinson Elsdale the autobiographer.

Leeves was a good musician and a competent performer on the violoncello. In 1772 he wrote the music to the song 'Auld Robin Gray' by Lady Anne Barnard. The autograph is in the British Museum (Addit. MS. 29387). Lady Anne had originally written her words to a Scottish melody previously known as 'The Bridegroom greets' but Leeves's music at once superseded the old tune. According to Oliphant, in his edition of 'Auld Robin Gray.' published in 1843, Leeves brought out about 1790, in conjunction with Henry Harington of Bath and Mr Broderip of Wells, a volume of glees. In 1812 he published 'Six Sacred Airs, intended as a Domestic Sunday Evening Recreation, accompanied by a Pianoforte or Harpsichord, two of them by a Violoncello Obligato or Violin.' In the dedication to his friend, Thomas Hammersley, Leeves first publicly acknowledged the composition of 'Auld Robin Gray.' owing, it was said, to the delight with which he had recently heard the air sung by Miss Stephens, afterwards Countess of Essex. Besides musical compositions he was author of a considerable number of short occasional poems, some of which were published.

== Sources ==
- This article incorporates text from a publication now in the public domain: Hughes-Hughes, Augustus (1892). "Leeves, William". In Lee, Sidney (ed.). Dictionary of National Biography. Vol. 32. London: Smith, Elder & Co. p. 396.
