= Dale Ingram =

English physician

- Born: 1710
- Died: 5 April 1793 (aged 82–83)
- Occupation: Physician

Dale Ingram (1710 – 5 April 1793) was an English physician.

== Biography ==
Ingram was born in 1710, and, after apprenticeship and study in the country, began practice at Reading, Berkshire, in 1733, and there, in 1743, published ‘An Essay on the Gout.’ Later in that year he emigrated to Barbadoes, where he practised till 1750, when he returned to England and set up as a surgeon and man midwife on Tower Hill, London. In 1751 he published ‘Practical Cases and Observations in Surgery,’ his most important work. It contains records of cases observed in England and the West Indies. He describes one successful and one unsuccessful operation in cases of abdominal wounds penetrating the bowel. He washed the intestine with hot claret, and then stitched the peritoneum to the edge of the wound and the abdominal wall. The procedure is one of the earliest English examples of a method of surgery which was later universally adopted. In 1754 he went to live in Fenchurch Street, London, and in 1755 published ‘An Historical Account of the several Plagues that have appeared in the World since the year 1346.’ It is a mere compilation. On 24 January 1759 he was elected from among five candidates to the office of surgeon to Christ's Hospital, and thenceforward resided there. He sometimes visited Epsom, and in 1767 published ‘An Enquiry as to the Origin of Magnesia Alba,’ the principal saline ingredient of the Epsom springs. A controversy had arisen as to the cause of death of a potman who had received a blow on the head in an election riot at Brentford in 1769, and he published a lengthy pamphlet entitled ‘The Blow, or Inquiry into the Cause of Mr. Clarke's Death at Brentford,’ which demonstrates that blood-poisoning arising from an ill-dressed scalp wound was the true cause of death. In 1777 he published ‘A Strict and Impartial Inquiry into the Cause of Death of the late William Scawen,’ an endeavour to prove that poison had not been administered. In 1790 it was stated that he was too old for his work at Christ's Hospital, and as he would not resign he was superseded in 1791. He died at Epsom on 5 April 1793.
