= William Norford =

English medical practitioner and writer (1715–1793)

William Norford (1715–1793) was an English medical practitioner and writer.

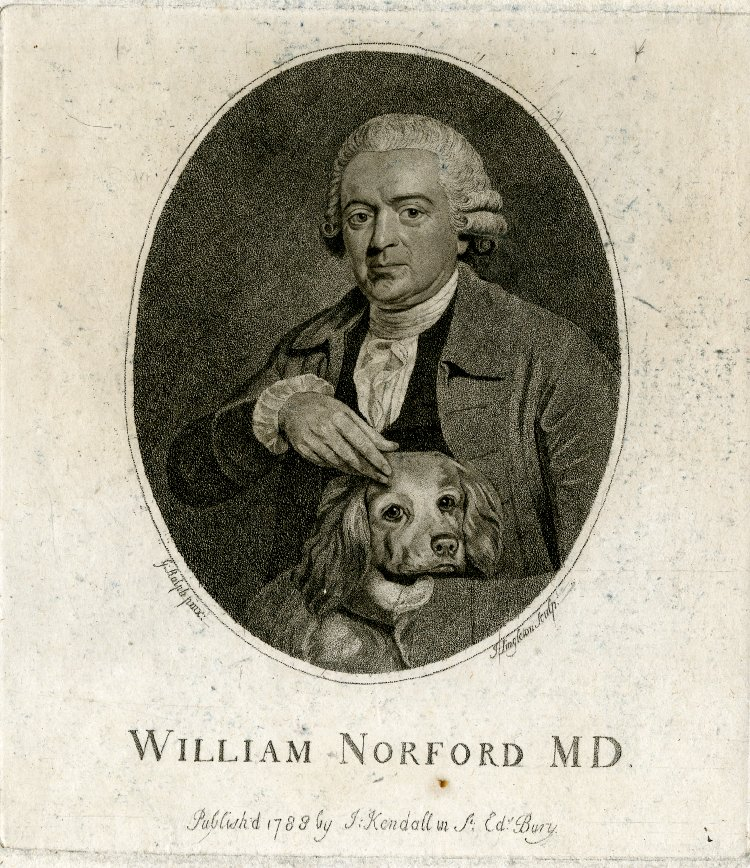
William Norford

== Life ==
Norford was apprenticed to John Amyas, a surgeon in Norwich, and then began practice at Halesworth in Suffolk, as a surgeon and man-midwife. He married the daughter of a surgeon, and after some years moved to Bury St Edmunds. He became an extra-licentiate of the College of Physicians of London on 26 November 1761, and began to practise as a physician: on the strength of his licence he styled himself Doctor.

Norford died in 1793.

== Works ==
Norford began to write inspired by the example of Dale Ingram, and some remarks of John Freke. His works were:

- An Essay on the General Method of treating Cancerous Tumours (1753), dedicated to Freke who was senior surgeon to St Bartholomew's Hospital. Norford endeavoured to establish rules for the treatment of cancer, discussing the views of Henri-François Le Dran, Gerard van Swieten, and Richard Wiseman, and stating cases of his own. He believed in a sulphur electuary, and a proprietary ointment.
- A Letter to Dr. Sharpin in Answer to his Appeal to the Public concerning his Medical Treatment of Mr. John Ralling, apothecary, of Bury St. Edmund's in Suffolk, pamphlet of 1764, written against Dr. Edward Sharpin of East Dereham, over a case of intestinal obstruction.
- Concisæ et Practicæ Observationes de Intermittentibus Febribus curandis (1780).

== Notes ==
Attribution

This article incorporates text from a publication now in the public domain: Lee, Sidney, ed. (1895). "Norford, William". Dictionary of National Biography. Vol. 41. London: Smith, Elder & Co.
