= François-Louis Perne =

French composer and writer on music

François-Louis Perne, also known as François Perne (4 October 1772 – 26 May 1832), was a French composer and writer on music. He was known both for his writings on the history of music and also for being a director of the Paris Conservatoire.

== Biography ==
François-Louis Perne was born in Paris. He started his musical training as a choirboy in the parish of Saint-Jacques-de-la-Boucherie. In 1792, he became a tenor in the chorus of the Opéra National de Paris, where he remained until 1799, when he became a contrabassist in the orchestra.

In 1811 he was appointed professor of harmony at the Paris Conservatoire as a successor to Charles Catel. He later became general inspector of the Conservatoire in 1816 and librarian in 1819. He died at Laon.

== Selected works ==
=== Essays ===
- Cours élémentaire d'harmonie (1823)
- Ancienne musique des chansons du châtelain de Coucy mise en notation moderne (Paris, 1830)

=== Composition ===
- Fugue à trois partes, trois modes, quatre sujets et quatre faces (1800)
- Canon à sept parties et à nombreuses mutations
