= Maria Rosa Coccia =

Italian harpsichordist and composer

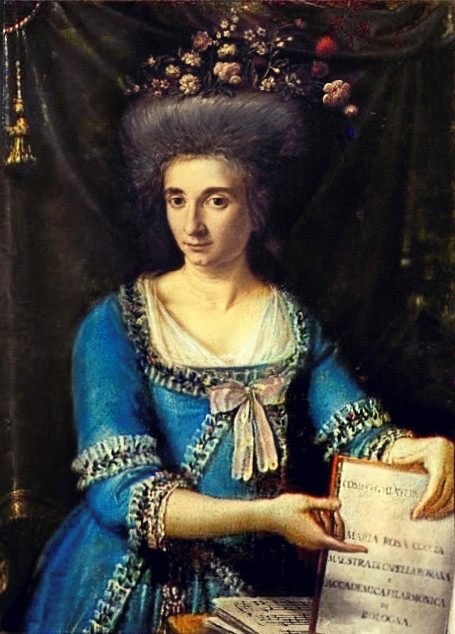
- portrait by Antonio Cavalucci
- Born: 4 January 1759; Rome, Papal States
- Died: November 1833 (aged 74); Rome, Papal States
- Occupations: Harpsichordist, composer

Maria Rosa Coccia (4 January 1759 – November 1833) was an Italian harpsichordist and composer. She achieved fame as a child, after composing sonatas and an oratorio that was performed at the Oratory S. Filippo Neri, in defiance of a tradition that women were not allowed to attend the event. After passing the examination for the Roman Accademia di Santa Cecilia, she was admitted to the academy.

== Life ==
Maria Rosa Coccia was born in Rome on 4 January 1759 and studied with Sante Pesci. At the age of 13, Coccia composed six sonatas for harpsichord and the oratorio Daniello, which was performed the same year in the Oratory S. Filippo Neri, in defiance of a tradition that women were not allowed to attend the event.

In 1716, Pope Clement XI had decreed that anyone practising music in Rome must enter the Accademia di Santa Cecilia and pass the exam to become Maestro di Capella. At 16, Coccia passed the exam and received the title, but because of her gender was never allowed to execute the duties of the position, though her music was performed. Her examination piece was hic vir despiciens mundum, and was 'widely acclaimed'. As a practising composer, she was admitted to Rome's Accademia de' Forti.

In 1780, Maestro di Cappella Francesco Capalti of Narni Cathedral attacked Coccia's examination composition and her receipt of the title. She was defended by Michele Mallio in his Elogio storico della signora Maria Rosa Coccia romana (Rome, 1780), containing letters of support from Metastasio, Carlo Broschi and Giovanni Battista Martini. Pasquale Antonio Basili in 1784 published an open letter in defense of Coccia and against criticism of Capalti. The last known work of Coccia's was an 1783 cantata for four voices.

Maria Rosa Coccia died in Rome in November 1833.

== Works ==
Selected works include:

- Six Sonatas for harpsichord
- Daniello nel lago dei leoni, oratorio in two parts, Rome, Chiesa Nuova, 1772, lost
- L'isola disabitata (P. Metastasio), 1772, lost
- Hic vir despiciens mundum, fugue, 4 voices, Rome, 1774 (examination piece for Congregazione di S Cecilia, and Accademia Filarmonica, Bologna)
- Magnificat, Soprano voice, Contralto voice, organ, 1774
- Dixit Dominus, 8 voices, organ, 1775 (may be same as Dixit Dominus, 8 voices, violin, viola, oboe, flute, horn)
- Il trionfo d'Enea, cantata in two parts, Soprano voice, Soprano voice, Contralto voice, Tenor voice, violin, viola, horn, trumpet, oboe, contrabbasso, basso continuo, ?1779
- Ifigenia, cantata, 2 sopranos, orchestra, 1779, composed for the Princess Maria Luisa of Bourbon-Parma
- Arsinoe, cantata, 4 voices, orchestra, 1783
- Confitebor, Soprano voice, Soprano voice, organ
- ‘Qualche lagrime spargete’ from Semiramide, lost
- Salve Regina, 2 voices, organ, n.d.
- Veni Creator Spiritus, 4 voices, organ
- 4 psalms, lost
