= Thomas Cook (engraver) =

Thomas Cook (c. 1744 – 1818) was an English engraver, known particularly for his engravings of the works of William Hogarth.

== Career ==
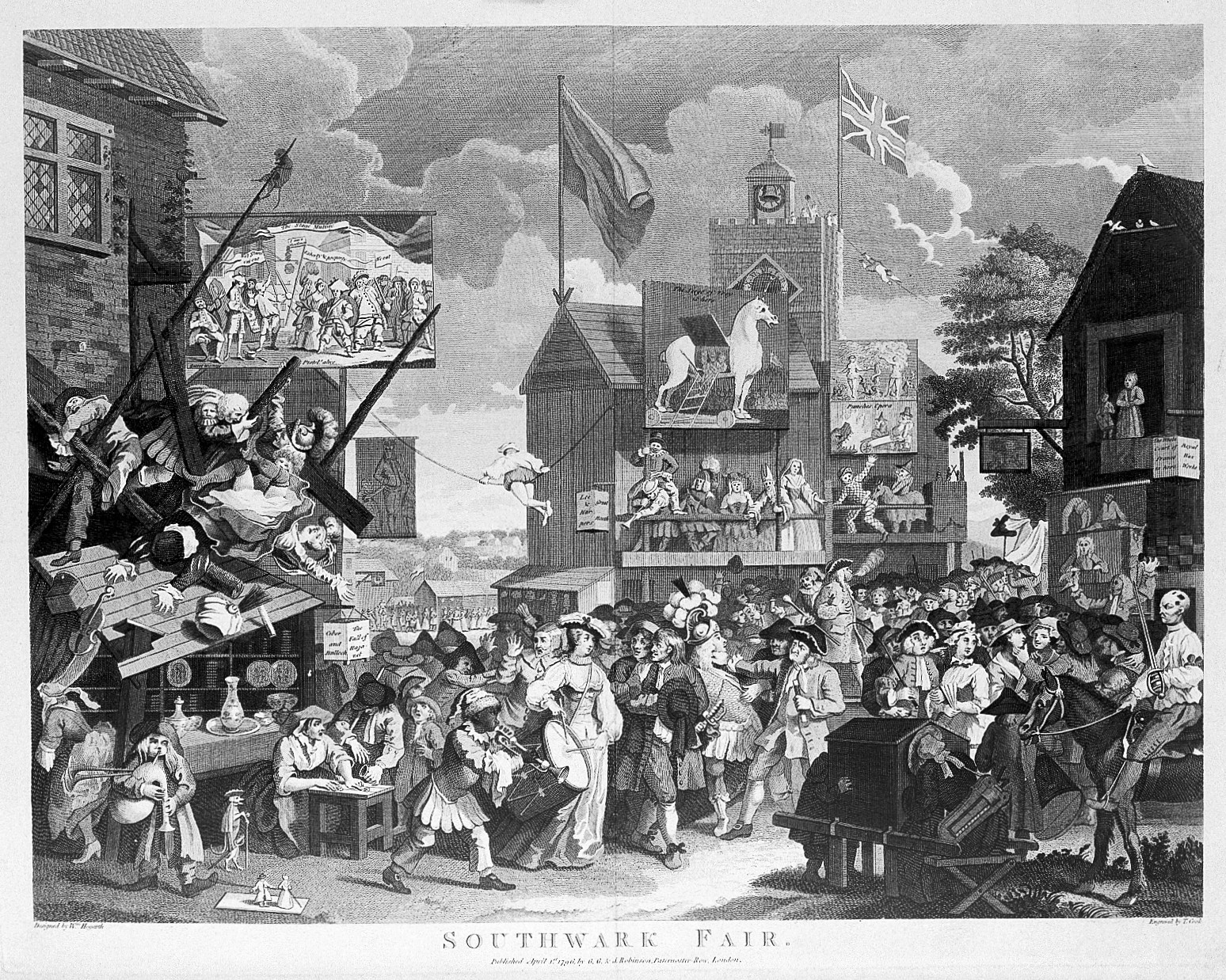
Southwark Fair by Cook, after Hogarth

Cook was a pupil of Simon François Ravenet, who at the time was resident in London. Cook was very industrious, and, soon reaching a high position in his art, was employed by John Boydell and other art publishers on works which had a large circulation. He is best known from having copied the complete engraved work of William Hogarth, to which he devoted the years 1795 to 1803, and which was published in 1806 under the title of Hogarth Restored. This is a very valuable collection, as many of Hogarth's prints were of great rarity, and had not been made public before. He executed a reduced set of his Hogarth engravings for Nichol and Stevens's Genuine Works of William Hogarth (1808–1817).

Cook was employed also in engraving history, architecture, and plates for magazines. Among his works are Jupiter and Semele and Jupiter and Europa, after Benjamin West; The English Setter, after John Milton, engraved with S. Smith in 1770 as a pendant to The Spanish Pointer, by William Woollett; The Wandering Musicians, a copy of Johann Georg Wille's engraving, after Christian Wilhelm Ernst Dietrich; St Cecilia, after Richard Westall, and several views after Paul Sandby for The Copperplate Magazine.

He also engraved many portraits, for The Gentleman's Magazine and others, and as frontispieces. Among these were Thomas Howard, Earl of Arundel; George Washington, Samuel Johnson, Oliver Goldsmith, Charles Churchill, John Cunningham, William Harvey, David Hume and Joseph Spence.

Cook died in London in 1818, aged 74.
