= Sophia Johnston =

Scottish carpenter and blacksmith

Sophia Johnston (1730–1810), was a Scottish carpenter and blacksmith, regarded to be the first origin of the Robin Gray song.
