= Sir Wathen Waller, 1st Baronet =

Sir Wathen Waller
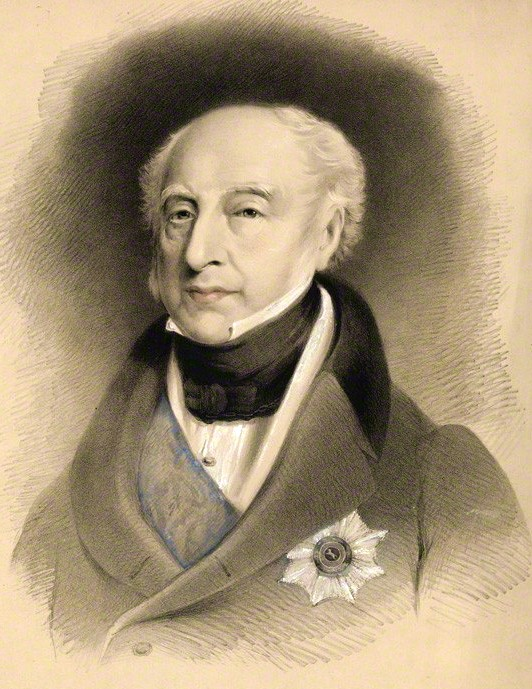
- hand-tinted lithograph
- Born: Jonathan Wathen Phipps; 6 October 1769; London
- Died: 1 January 1853 (aged 83); St. Marylebone, London
- Occupation: ophthalmologist
- Years active: 1795–1837
- Known for: Eye doctor of George III, George IV and William IV

Sir Jonathan Wathen Waller, 1st Baronet (né Phipps; 6 October 1769 – 1 January 1853), was an English eye surgeon, who practiced in London during the latter part of Georgian era. He was the eye doctor of King George III of Great Britain and his son William IV. He also attended the death of George IV.

== Life and career ==
Waller was born Jonathan Wathen Phipps on 6 October 1769 in London to Joshua Phipps and Mary Allen, the step-daughter of Jonathan Wathen, a well-known eye surgeon, who practiced in London from about 1760 until his 1808 death. The elder Jonathan for many years had a junior partner in his practice named James Ware, who ultimately became one of the best known eye surgeons in the city. When Ware in 1791 dissolved their partnership to begin his own practice, Wathen took on his step grandson Jonathan Phipps as an apprentice. As with Ware, Phipp's medical reputation grew, and by 1795 he had become the oculist (eye doctor) to both King George III, and George's third son William.

The War with Napoleon took place during the latter part of George III's reign, and many soldiers returning to Britain from the Nile Campaign had contracted a virulent eye disease widely known as the "Egyptian ophthalmia". Little was known at the time about treating it effectively, and this led Phipps to start in 1804 the Royal Infirmary for Diseases of the Eye, which was the first hospital of its kind in London. The establishment of this institution preceded by several months the 1805 founding by John Cunningham Saunders of the much better known London Dispensary for curing Diseases of the Eye and Ear on Charterhouse Square, which later became the Royal London Ophthalmic Hospital (Moorfields Eye Hospital).

Phipps in 1814 assumed the name Waller to inherit the estates of his maternal great-grandfather Thomas Waller (d. 1731), and he used the name Jonathan Wathen Waller on 27 December 1814 when George III created him the 1st Baronet of Braywick Lodge. When George III died in 1820, Jonathan then became the physician to George's eldest son and heir, George IV, and when this king died in 1830, Jonathan attended him on his deathbed. He subsequently became the Groom of the Bedchamber for George IV's younger brother and heir William IV. The new king soon afterward in 1832 made Jonathan a Knight Grand Cross of the Royal Guelphic Order (G.C.H.).

Jonathan Wathen Waller married twice, marrying first Elizabeth Slack (d. 1809) the daughter of Thomas Slack of Braywick Lodge, Berkshire, by whom he had four children; and second he married in 1812 Sophia Charlotte Curzon (née Howe), the Baroness of Langar, Nottinghamshire, and daughter of Admiral "Blackjack" Richard Howe. He and Charlotte had no children together. He was succeeded as baronet by his oldest son Thomas Wathen-Waller. Although he was an eye doctor, Sir Jonathan lost his own sight in his later years, and died on 1 January 1853 at Cavendish Square in St. Marylebone, London. His burial took place in the vault of Trinity Church on 7 January 1853.

== Notes ==
Baronetage of the United Kingdom
New creation	Baronet of Braywick Lodge; 1815–1853	Succeeded by Thomas Waller
