= Le stravaganze del conte =

Le stravaganze del conte (meaning The Eccentricities of the Count) is the first opera by Italian composer Domenico Cimarosa. The comic opera was first performed at the Teatro de' Fiorentini at Naples in 1772.
