= Domenico Cimarosa =

Italian composer (1749–1801)

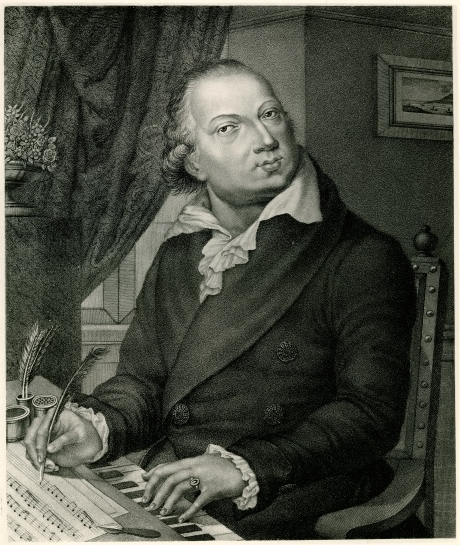
- Born: 17 December 1749; Aversa, Kingdom of Naples
- Died: 11 January 1801 (aged 51); Venice, Venetian Province
- Occupation: Composer
- Works: List of compositions
- Spouses: Constanza Suffi; Gaetana Romaniello
- Children: 4
- Website: https://amzn.eu/d/027gWR6c

Domenico Cimarosa (Italian: [doˈmɛːniko tʃimaˈrɔːza]; 17 December 1749 – 11 January 1801) was an Italian composer of the Neapolitan School and of the Classical period. He wrote more than eighty operas, the best known of which is Il matrimonio segreto (1792); most of his operas are comedies. He also wrote instrumental works and church music.

Cimarosa was principally based in Naples, but spent some of his career in various other parts of Italy, composing for the opera houses of Rome, Venice, Florence and elsewhere. He was engaged by Catherine the Great of Russia as her court composer and conductor between 1787 and 1791. In his later years, returning to Naples, he backed the losing side in the struggle to overthrow the monarchy there, and was imprisoned and then exiled. He died in Venice at the age of 51.

== Life and career ==
=== Early years ===
Cimarosa was born in Aversa (now in the province of Caserta), a city near Naples. His surname was Cimmarosa, as shown on his baptismal certificate. He was not an only child. A few days after Domenico's birth, his mother moved to Naples, while his father Gennaro found work as a waiter serving the Filomarino family of Pozzuoli, where he died in 1750, when Domenico was only 11 months old. His widow, Anna, was hired as a laundress by the monastic order of the Church of San Severo, and Cimarosa received a good education, including musical training, from the monks and clergy of the church.

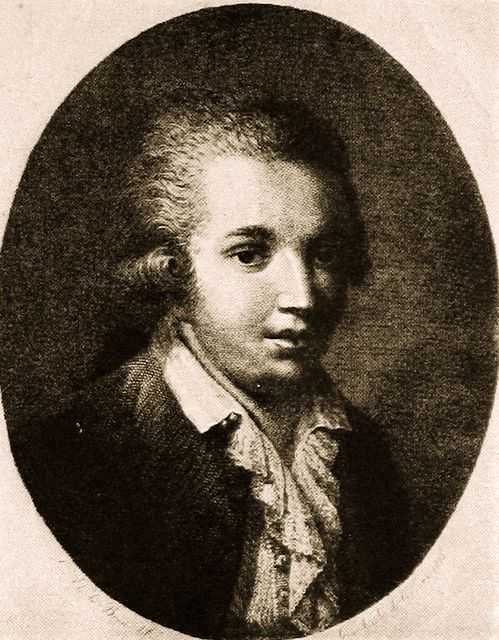
Cimarosa as a child

The organist of the monastery, Padre Polcano, took a particular interest in his education and Cimarosa progressed so well in his musical studies that he was admitted to Naples's leading college of music, the Conservatorio di S Maria di Loreto, in 1761, when he was twelve. His teachers were Gennaro Manna and Fedele Fenaroli for composition and Saverio Carcais, the maestro de violino. He was a capable keyboard player, violinist and singer, but composition was his primary concern as a student; in 1770 he, Niccolò Antonio Zingarelli and Giuseppe Giordani were senior students in the composition class.

As a student, Cimarosa wrote sacred motets and masses, but he first came to public notice with the premiere in 1772 of his first commedia per musica, Le stravaganze del conte, performed at the Teatro dei Fiorentini in Naples. The work met with approval, and was followed in the same year by Le pazzie di Stelladaura e di Zoroastro. This work was also successful, and the fame of the young composer began to spread all over Italy. In 1774, he was invited to Rome to write an opera for the stagione of that year; and there he produced another comic opera called L'italiana in Londra. In 1777 he married Constanza Suffi, who died the following year.

=== Successful composer ===
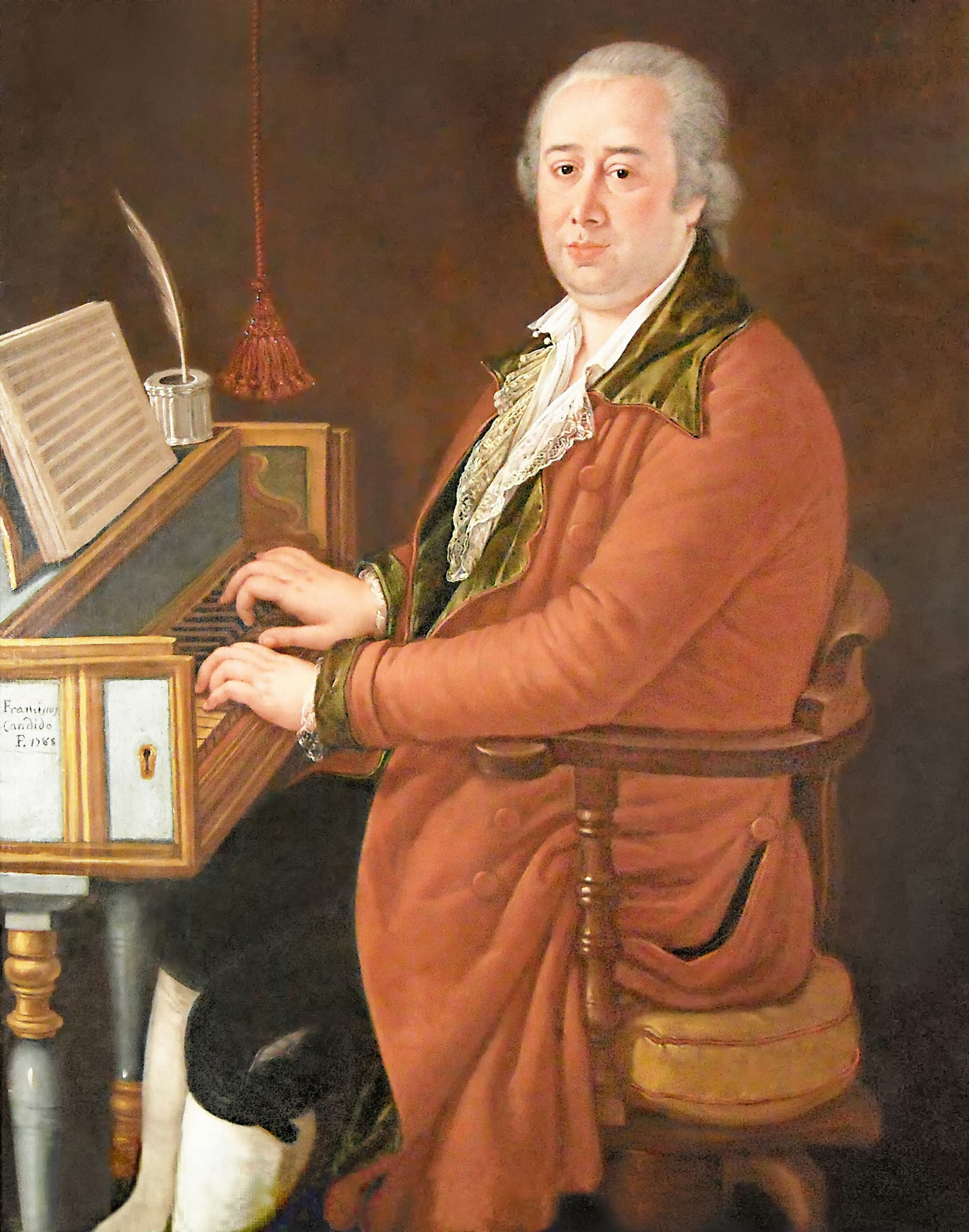
Cimarosa composing

In the 1770s and 1780s Cimarosa wrote numerous operas for the theatres of Italy. He was best known for his comedies, but wrote serious works from time to time, including Caio Mario (1780) and Alessandro nell'Indie (1781). As well as stage works he wrote church music. He was appointed supernumerary organist of the Neapolitan royal court in November 1779, and by the early 1780s he was a visiting maestro at the Ospedaletto di Santi Giovanni e Paolo, Venice.

For Rome, he composed operas for three different theatres in the late 1780s and early 1780s; these works included Il ritorno di Don Calandrino, L'italiana in Londra, Le donne rivali, Il pittore parigino and for La Scala, Milan, following the success there of a revival of L'impresario in angustie, he composed La Circe, a dramma per musica in three acts, with a story loosely based on the Odyssey. At some point in the 1780s Cimarosa married for the second time; his wife, Gaetana, née Pallante, was Constanza's step-sister; she and Cimarosa had two sons. She died in 1796.

In 1787, Cimarosa went to Saint Petersburg at the invitation of Empress Catherine II. He was one of a succession of Italian composers engaged by the Russian court over the years; others were Vincenzo Manfredini (from 1762 to 1769), Baldassare Galuppi (1765–1768), Tommaso Traetta (1768–1775), Giovanni Paisiello (1776–1784), and Giuseppe Sarti (1785–1801). He composed a serious opera, Cleopatra, and revised two of his existing comic pieces Le donne rivali and I due baroni di Rocca Azzurra. Other compositions for Catherine's court included a Requiem, in G minor (1787). Cimarosa was less successful in Saint Petersburg than some of his compatriots; the works of his subordinate, Martin y Soler, gained more favour with the empress, and this, combined with economies that meant losing most of the Italian singers, and Cimarosa's dislike of the severe Russian winters, led him to leave Russia in June 1791.

After spending three months in Warsaw, Cimarosa arrived in Vienna. His music was already popular there, and the emperor, Leopold II, appointed him Kapellmeister to the court, and commissioned a new opera. The result was Il matrimonio segreto, to a text by Giovanni Bertati, based on the 1766 play, The Clandestine Marriage, by George Colman the Elder and David Garrick. (Note: The play was inspired by one of the pictures in William Hogarth's Marriage A-la-mode, painted in the mid-1740s.) The opera, performed at the Burgtheater on 7 February 1792, was so successful that Leopold had it played again the same evening in his private chambers – "the longest encore in operatic history" as one critic put it. Cimarosa did not consider the work his best, but it has a better libretto than some of his other comic operas, the plot clear, the characters well drawn and elaborate disguises and coincidences dispensed with. The composer's own favourite of his operas was Artemisia, regina di Caria, a serious work, composed for Naples five years later.

=== Later years ===
Cimarosa's success was international. He was, together with Paisiello, the most popular opera composer in the late 18th century. He composed 60 opere buffe and 20 opere serie, many of which quickly entered the repertoire of opera houses throughout Europe. They were performed in Berlin, Copenhagen, Hamburg, London, Prague and Stockholm, as well as Saint Petersburg, Vienna and all the main Italian cities. Between 1783 and 1790 Haydn conducted performances of thirteen Cimarosa operas for his employers at Schloss Esterházy and many of the pieces were given several times. Cimarosa's La ballerina amante, a commedia per musica first performed in Naples was chosen as the inaugural work at the Teatro Nacional de São Carlos, Lisbon, in June 1793.

Three weeks after the premiere of Il matrimonio segreto the emperor Leopold died suddenly. His successor, Francis II, was less interested in music than Leopold had been, and in 1793, Cimarosa returned to Naples. In 1796 he was appointed principal organist of the royal chapel, and he continued to produce new operas and revise older ones. He reworked L'italiana in Londra and I due baroni, adapting them for local taste by adding sections in Neapolitan dialect. The most important new works from this last phase of his career were Le astuzie femminili (1794) and two serious operas, Penelope (1794) and Gli Orazi e i Curiazi (1796); the first two of these were composed for Naples, and the last for La Fenice in Venice.

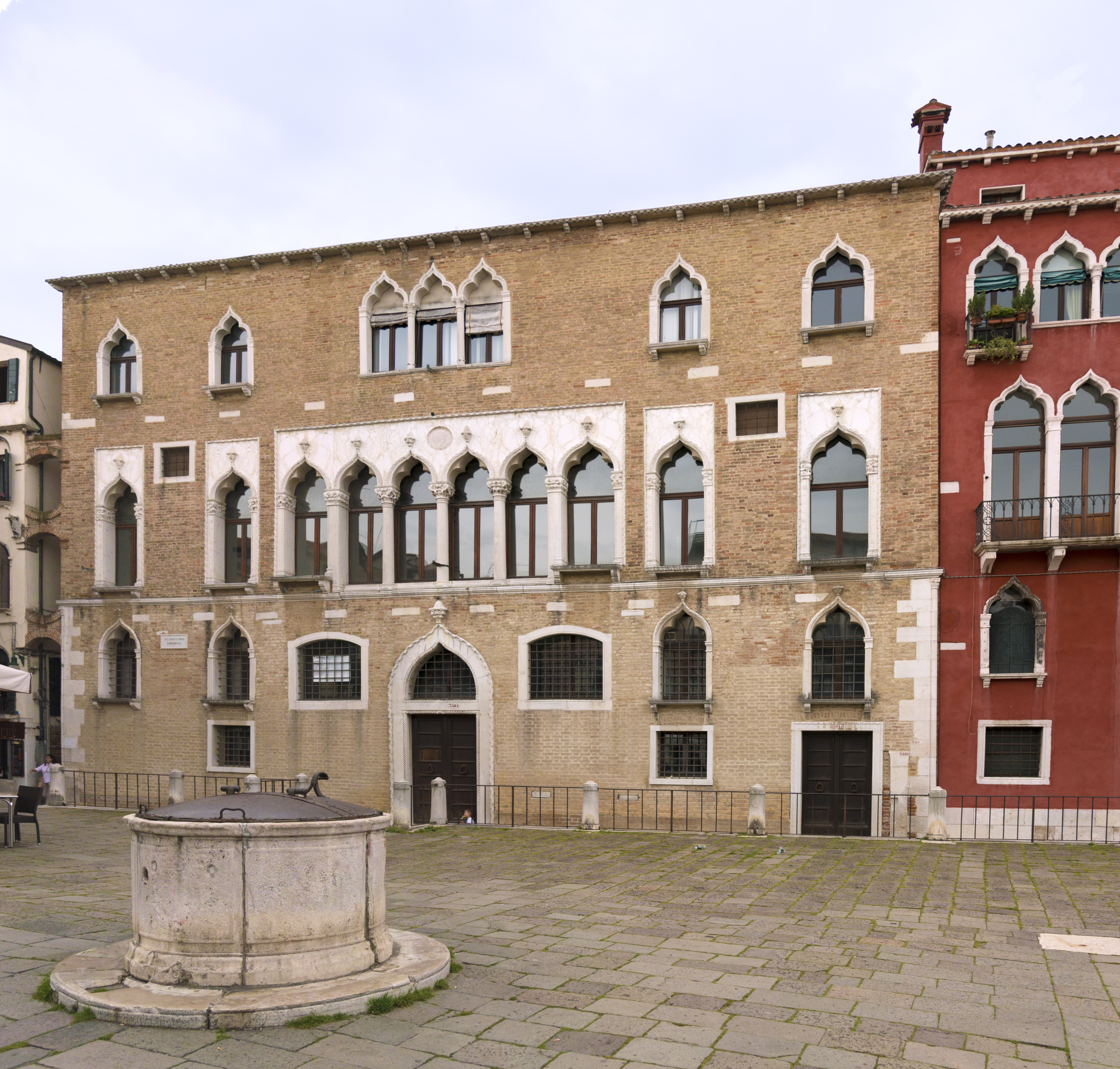
Palazzo Duodo, Campo Sant'Angelo, Venice, Cimarosa's last home, where he died

During the occupation of Naples by the troops of the French Republic, in 1799 Cimarosa joined the liberal party, but the monarchy was soon restored, and took strong measures against those with liberal or revolutionary connections. Cimarosa was imprisoned along with many of his political friends, and escaped the death sentence only through the intercession of influential admirers, including Cardinals Consalvi and Ruffo and Lady Hamilton. He was exiled from Naples, and went to Venice. He was terminally ill by this time, probably with stomach cancer, and he died on 11 January 1801, aged 51, composing until almost the end. His last opera, Artemisia, was left unfinished. A rumour spread that he had been poisoned by agents of the Bourbons, but an inquest showed it to be unfounded. He was buried in the now destroyed Church of St. Michael the Archangel, near where he had lived in Venice.

== Works ==
Although Cimarosa wrote a considerable quantity of instrumental and church music, he was, and remains, best known for his operas. He was famous for his facility as a composer, although he frequently reused material, as was usual in his day, and employed assistants for routine tasks such as composing recitatives. In the article on Cimarosa in Grove's Dictionary of Music and Musicians (2001), Jennifer E. Johnson and Gordana Lazarevich write that he rose above the mediocrity of some the librettos he set and produced music "suffused with lightness, elegance and finesse".

Cimarosa avoided the rigidity of the traditional da capo aria, and wrote solo numbers consisting of more flexible divisions, with changes of tempo, metre and key to reflect the words of his librettists. Johnson and Lazarevich comment that this freedom of form conveys spontaneity and flexibility. Cimarosa's arias often speed up for the closing section, in the style of cabalettas. Providing contrast to the vocal display pieces, he often wrote quite simple arias in the manner of cavatinas. A feature of his scores is the sustained writing for concerted voices. In the words of the Grove article:

One of Cimarosa's strengths was the composition of witty and vivacious ensembles. Il matrimonio segreto, an ensemble opera in the style of Mozart's Le nozze di Figaro, is composed of eight arias, four duets, three trios, a quartet, a quintet and two finales featuring all six characters.

Harmonically, Cimarosa was not innovative, remaining content with traditional diatonic conventions. In the view of Johnson and Lazarevich his musical strengths are to be found in "the richness of his melodic invention, the brilliance and energy of his rhythmic and melodic motifs and his constantly lively accompaniments".

Cimarosa's approach to orchestration developed over his career. His earlier works are generally written for strings, oboes, horns and trumpets, and occasionally bassoons and flutes. In these pieces the function of the orchestra is to provide discreet support for the voices. During his four years in Saint Petersburg, he began to use clarinets, and to orchestrate more fully and richly. Johnson and Lazarevich instance Il matrimonio segreto, in which a large orchestra "provides colour and exhibits independent motivic and rhythmic material that serves as commentary on the action".

Cimarosa wrote a number of piano sonatas, which were discovered in manuscript in the 1920s; the quantity has been asserted as over 80 single-movement works, but it is thought that many of these may in fact belong with each other as three-movement works. The work sometimes referred to as Cimarosa's "Concerto for oboe" is in fact a 1949 confection by Arthur Benjamin, consisting of arrangements of movements from the sonatas.

== Reputation ==
Johnson and Lazarevich write that Cimarosa's reputation during his lifetime reached a height unsurpassed until Rossini's heyday, and he continued to be highly regarded into the 19th century. Eugène Delacroix preferred Cimarosa's music to Mozart's. He wrote of Il matrimonio segreto, "It is perfection itself. No other musician has this symmetry, this expressiveness and sense of the appropriate, this gaiety and tenderness, and above all … incomparable elegance". Stendhal wrote that Cimarosa, Mozart and Shakespeare were the only passions of his life. To Stendhal, Cimarosa was "the Molière of composers", and he claimed to have seen Il matrimonio segreto more than 100 times. (Note: In his last years Stendhal slightly revised his assessment of Cimarosa, finding himself more taken with the harmonic richness and unpredictability of Mozart and Rossini.)

Hector Berlioz, who hated Italian opera, was not an admirer: "I should throw to the devil the unique and interminable Matrimonio Segreto, which is nearly as tiresome as The Marriage of Figaro without being anything like so musical." Robert Schumann was impressed by Cimarosa's "absolutely masterful" orchestration, but by little else. Eduard Hanslick praised Cimarosa's wonderful facility, masterly compositional strokes and good taste. "Full of sunshine – that is the right expression for Cimarosa's music".

== Notes, references and sources ==
=== Sources ===
- “Cimarosa – La vita sconosciuta del musicista più conosciuto al mondo” di Fabio Di Lella e Maurizio Brunacci https://amzn.eu/d/027gWR6c
- Holden, Amanda (1997) [1993]. The Penguin Opera Guide. London: Penguin Books. ISBN 978-0-14-051385-1.
- Osborne, Richard (2007). Rossini (second ed.). Oxford: Oxford University Press. ISBN 978-0-19-518129-6.
- Riley, Charles A. (2001). Aristocracy and the Modern Imagination. Hanover, New Hampshire: University Press of New England. ISBN 978-1-58465-151-2.
- Rossi, Nick; Fauntleroy, Talmage (1999). Domenico Cimarosa: His Life and His Operas. Westport: Greenwood Press. ISBN 978-0-313-30112-4.
