= Theophilus Thompson (physician) =

English physician (1807–1860)

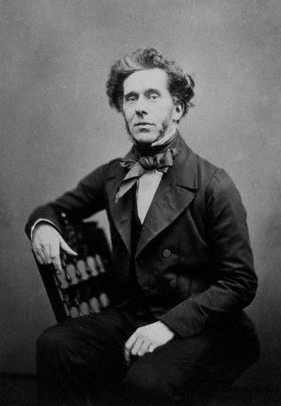
- portrait taken in 1855
- Born: 20 September 1807; Islington, London, England
- Died: 11 August 1860 (aged 52); Sutton, Surrey, England
- Occupation: Physician
- Years active: 1830 - 1860
- Known for: work on influenza, tuberculosis Fellow of Royal Society

Theophilus Thompson, M.D., F.R.S. (1807–1860) was a London physician of the Victorian era known for his writings on tuberculosis and influenza.

== Biography ==
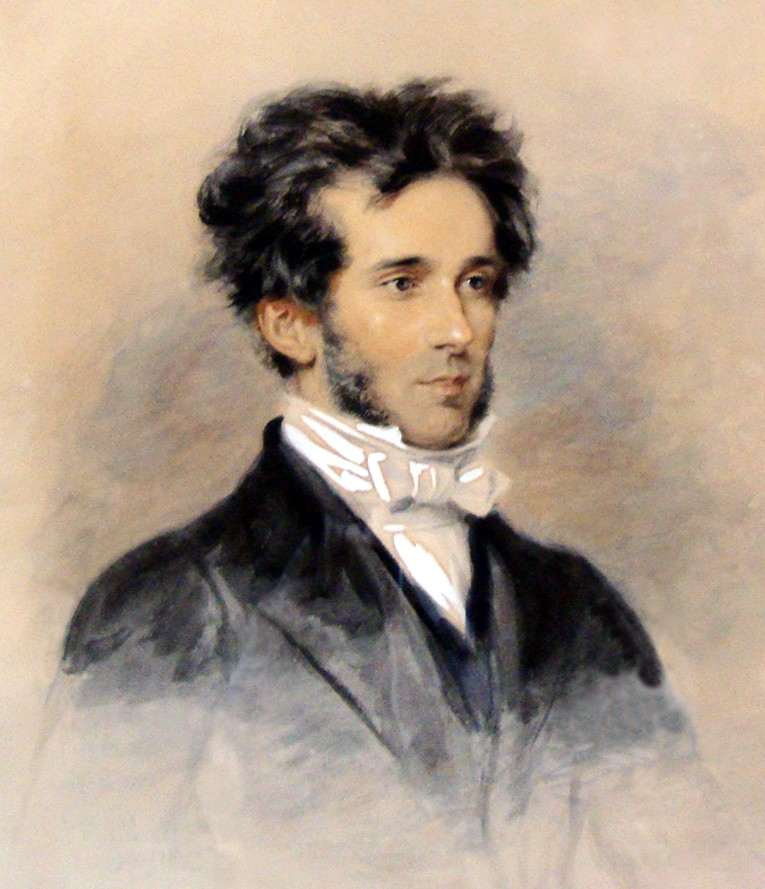
Watercolor portrait of Theophilus Thompson by Alfred Essex.

=== Early life ===
Thompson was born on 20 September 1807 at Islington, London to Nathaniel Thompson (1761-1825), a textile merchant and member of the London Stock Exchange, and Nathaniel's wife Margaret Maw (d. 1811). He grew up in a religious household, and his upbringing after the premature death of his mother was overseen by his older brother Thomas Thompson (1785-1865), a well-known philanthropist of religious causes. As such, he grew up with Thomas Thompson's daughter Jemima Luke (née Thompson) (1813-1906), who was less than six years behind Theophilus in age, and who became a popular writer of children's hymns, religious studies, and other works. After studying medicine at St. Bartholomew's Hospital in Smithfield, London, Theophilus attended the University of Edinburgh, where in 1830 he received his M.D. degree. He also studied in Paris under the French physicians Gabriel Andral, and Guillaume Dupuytren, and attended lectures given by the zoologist Isidore Geoffroy Saint-Hilaire at the Jardin des Plantes.

=== Career ===
He started a medical practice in London, but was soon appointed a physician to the St. Pancras Northern Dispensary in Middlesex, London, where he practiced for fourteen years. He also served as a lecturer at the Grosvenor Place School of Medicine in London, and was elected on 22 January 1846 as a Fellow of the Royal Society. He was then admitted in 1847 as a physician to the Hospital for Consumption and Diseases of the Chest, when it was located on Great Marlborough Street, before the facility relocated to become the Royal Brompton Hospital. In addition, he served as president in 1844 of the Medical Society of London, and also as president of Harveian Society of London, which today shares facilities with the Medical Society but was a separate group in Thompson's time. He is credited with introducing cod-liver oil into England, being the first to give bismuth to arrest diarrhea of phthisis (tuberculosis), and the first to prescribe oxide of zinc for night sweats. He was also one of the first British doctors to use the recently invented monaural stethoscope, having learned its use during his Paris studies.

=== Personal life ===
He married Elizabeth Anna Maria Wathen (1807-1867), the second daughter of Nathaniel Wathen, a wealthy clothier of Stroud, Gloucestershire on 25 January 1831 at St. Pancras Church in Camden, London. They had five children.

1. Theophilus Wathen Thompson (22 May 1832 – 24 May 1905) married Maria Elizabeth Abbott and became a solicitor.
2. Elizabeth Gertrude Thompson (30 April 1833 - June 1904) married the Rev. John Kempthorne, a Fellow of Trinity College, Cambridge.
3. Arthur Steinkopff Thompson (27 December 1835 – 27 April 1919) entered the clergy and became the vicar of Arundell, Baulking in Berkshire, and Little Marlow. He married Ellen Jameson.
4. Edmund Symes-Thompson (16 November 1837 – 24 November 1906) married Elizabeth (Lilla) Watkins. He succeeded to his father's old position as a physician at the Royal Brompton Hospital (formerly the Hospital for Consumption), was elected a Fellow of the Royal College of Physicians, and issued an updated version in 1890 of his father's 1852 paper on the History of the Epidemics of Influenza in Great Britain.
5. Constance Mary Thompson (29 October 1841 - 1924) married the Rev. Robert Cholmeley, the vicar of Findon.

=== Death ===
Thompson died of bronchitis at the age of 52 on 11 Aug. 1860 in Sutton, Surrey, and is buried in Norwood Cemetery in Lambeth, London. There is a watercolor portrait of him that was painted by the artist Alfred Essex (d. 1871), as well as a miniature portrait by Alfred's brother, William Essex (1784?-1869). There is also a photograph of Theophilus Thompson in the National Portrait Gallery in London.

== Publications ==
He authored several papers, including the following.

1. articles on "Chorea", "Hysteria", "Neuralgia"' and "Influenza" in the Library of Medicine by Alexander Tweedie, 1840.
2. On the Improvement of Medicine, an oration, 1838, with a summary in the British and Foreign Medical Review (v. 11, p. 196-197).
3. History of the Epidemics of Influenza in Great Britain from 1510 to 1837, published by the Sydenham Society, London, 1852, 406 p.
4. Clinical Lectures on Pulmonary Consumption, published by John Churchill, London, 1854, 211 p.
5. Lettsomian Lectures on Pulmonary Consumption,published by Samuel Highley, London, 1855, 38 p.
6. two papers in Proceedings of the Royal Society on changes produced in the blood by administering cocoanut oil and cod-liver oil (1854, v. VII, p. 41-42; and 1857, v. IX, p. 474-478).

In addition to Thompson's academic pursuits, he also acted as the London literary agent for his brother-in-law George Henry Wathen, who was editor of an Australian periodical called the Australasian, and author of a book on Egyptian antiquities, and another on gold mining in Australia. There in fact exists a letter between Thompson and Charles Dickens discussing the merits of the Australasian.
