= Mapletoft =

Mapletoft is a surname. Notable people with the surname include:

- John Mapletoft (1631–1721), English clergyman and physician
- Justin Mapletoft (born 1981), ice hockey player
- Mark Mapletoft (born 1971), rugby player
- Robert Mapletoft (1609–1677), Dean of Ely
