= Paul Delaune =

Paul Delaune (1584?–1654?) was an English physician, Gresham Professor of Physic during the Commonwealth.

== Life ==
A native of London, he was related, probably, to Gideon Delaune, the wealthy apothecary, and by marriage to Dr. Argent, who was eight times president of the College of Physicians, and who died in 1642. Delaune was educated at Emmanuel College, Cambridge, where he graduated B.A. in 1608 and M.A. in 1611. He graduated as M.D. at the University of Padua on 13 October 1614, and at the University of Cambridge on 4 November 1615. He was examined before the censors' board of the College of Physicians on 8 September 1615, admitted a candidate of the College of Physicians 25 June 1616, and became a fellow on 21 April 1618.

When Henry Cary, 1st Viscount Falkland was appointed Lord Deputy of Ireland, Delaune accompanied him as his physician, and resided for some years in Dublin. On 24 May 1642 he was made an elect, and in 1643 senior censor, of the College of Physicians. On 13 June 1643, after the withdrawal of Dr. Thomas Winston to the continent, Delaune was appointed professor of physic in Gresham College, through the influence of Thomas Chamberlane, a member of the Mercers' Company. On 27 June 1643 he was recommended by the college, in compliance with an order of John Lenthall, speaker of the House of Commons, as one of three physicians to the parliamentary army under Robert Devereux, 3rd Earl of Essex.

In 1652 Dr. Winston returned to England and was restored to the Gresham professorship (20 August) For some time after his compulsory resignation of the chair of physic Delaune was in straitened circumstances. Ultimately he accepted from Oliver Cromwell the appointment of physician-general to the fleet, which he accompanied first to Hispaniola, and afterwards to Jamaica. He was probably present at the capture of this island in 1653, but nothing further is known of his history or fate. According to Benjamin Hamey, his death took place in December 1654.
