= Edmund Symes-Thompson =

English physician

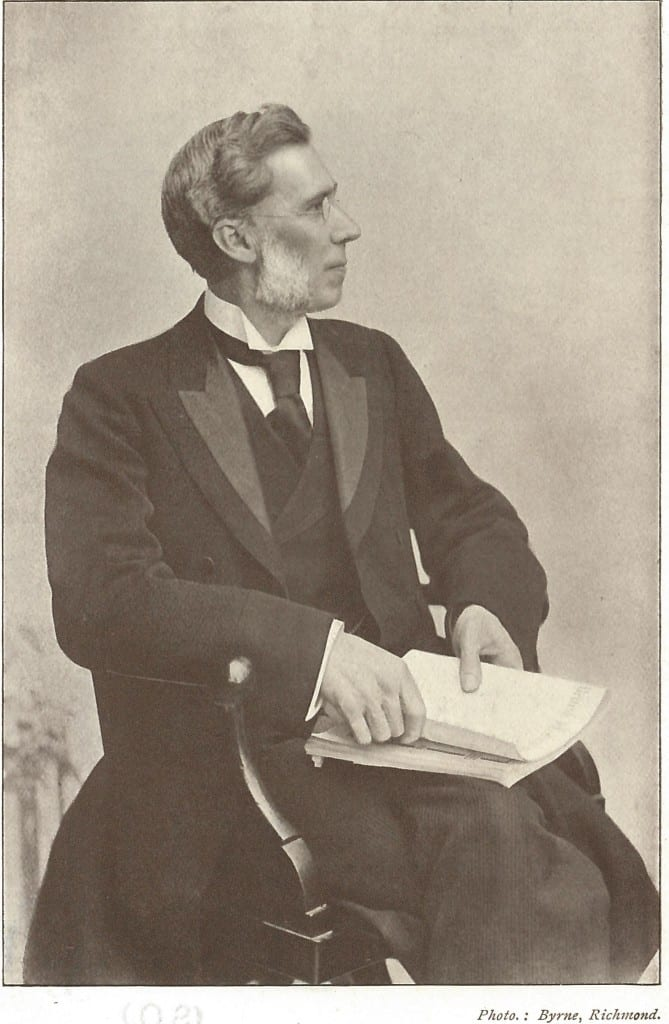
- Born: 16 November 1837; London
- Died: 24 November 1906 (aged 69); London
- Occupation: Physician

Edmund Symes-Thompson (16 November 1837 – 24 November 1906) was an English physician.

== Early life and education ==
Symes-Thompson was born in London on 16 November 1837. He was the son of Theophilus Thompson by his wife Anna Maria, daughter of Nathaniel Walker of Stroud. The name Symes was adopted by his father on inheriting property from the Rev. Richard Symes, the last surviving member of the Somerset branch of the Sydenhams, who were descended from Dr. Thomas Sydenham. Edmund received his early education at St. Paul's School, and in 1857 entered King's College. There he gained a gold medal and the Leathes and Warneford prizes for divinity, and prizes for general proficiency. His medical education was pursued at King's College Hospital, and whilst a student he took an active part in physiological investigations with Lionel Smith Beale. He graduated M.B. in 1859, gaining the scholarship in medicine, a gold medal and honours in surgery, botany, and midwifery; in 1860 he proceeded M.D.

== Academic career ==
In 1860 he was elected honorary assistant physician to King's College Hospital, and in 1863 to a similar post at the Hospital for Consumption, Brompton, to which his father had also been attached for many years. Having made up his mind to devote himself specially to consumption, he resigned his post at King's College Hospital in 1865. In 1869 he became honorary physician, and in 1889 honorary consulting physician to the Brompton Hospital. He was also honorary physician to the Royal Hospital for Consumption, Ventnor, and to the Artists' Benevolent and Artists' Annual funds. In 1867 he was elected professor of physic at Gresham College, and lectured regularly and with increasing efficiency to the end of his life. With his brother professors at the college, especially Benjamin Morgan Cowie, dean of Exeter, and John William Burgon, dean of Chichester, professor of geometry, he helped to develop the scheme of this old foundation and to popularise the lectures.

He became a member of the Royal College of Physicians in 1862, and a fellow in 1868. He was a fellow of the Royal Medical and Chirurgical and Medical societies, and a member of the Clinical and Harveian societies of London, acting as president in 1883 of the last society.

Symes-Thompson was specially interested in the value of climate and spa treatment for the relief of diseases, especially of the lungs, and travelled widely on the Continent, besides visiting Egypt, Algeria, and South Africa. He was one of the founders of the British Balneological and Climatological Society, and was president in 1903. It was largely through his influence and his pamphlet on 'Winter Health Resorts in the Alps' (1888) that Davos and St. Moritz became popular health resorts, and he was an active mover in the establishment of the invalids' home at Davos (1895), and of the Queen Alexandra Sanatorium, which was opened there (1909) after his death. His most important contributions to medical literature were 'Lectures on Pulmonary Tuberculosis' (1863) and 'On Influenza: an Historical Survey' (1890), both being in part revision of books by his father. He was also closely concerned in the publication by the Royal Medical and Chirurgical Society of the book entitled 'The Climates and Baths of Great Britain and Ireland’ (1895), besides contributing himself to its pages.

Life insurance also interested him greatly, and besides holding a prominent position amongst assurance medical officers in London as physician to the Equity and Law Life Assurance Society, he contributed an article on the subject to the two editions of Sir Clifford Allbutt's 'System of Medicine' (1896 and 1905).

Symes-Thompson, who had a large consulting practice amongst members of the church of England, cherished deep religious convictions, and he took active interest in many church institutions. He was a prominent worker in the guild of St. Luke, of which he was provost from 1893 to 1902, and he also assisted in establishing (1896) the annual medical service at St. Paul's Cathedral and the Medical Missionary College (1905). Both service and college were under the ægis of the guild of St. Luke. He was interested in the oral training for the deaf and dumb, writing a pamphlet on the subject, and being chairman for many years of the training college for teachers of the deaf and dumb at Ealing.

He lived first at 3 Upper George Street, and from 1878 to his death at 33 Cavendish Square. In 1899 he bought Finmere House, Oxfordshire, where he spent much of his leisure and gratified an early love for botany and a country life.

He died on 24 November 1906 at his house in Cavendish Square, London, and was buried in the parish churchyard at Finmere. There was an oil portrait in possession of the family by Mr. A. Tennyson Cole, and crayon portraits in Gresham College and the Royal Society of Medicine. His coat of arms was on one of the windows of St. Paul's School. He married on 25 July 1872 Elizabeth, daughter of Henry George Watkins, vicar of Potter's Bar, who survived him with four sons and two daughters.
