= George Wathen =

George Wathen may refer to:

- George Wathen (actor) (1762–1849), English actor, stage manager and theatre owner
- George Henry Wathen (1816–1879), geologist, author, magazine publisher and South African politician
