= Henry Paman =

English physician

Henry Paman (1626–1695) was an English physician.

== Life ==
Son of Robert Paman, he was born at his father's estate of Chevington, Suffolk. He entered as a sizar at Emmanuel College, Cambridge, on 22 June 1643, where William Sancroft was his tutor. They became friends for life. He migrated to St. John's College, on 22 July 1646, graduated B.A. the same year, and was elected a fellow of that college. He became M.A. in 1650, and was incorporated M.A. at Oxford on 11 July 1655. On 20 June 1656 he kept an act for a medical degree before Professor Francis Glisson, maintaining the thesis Morbis acutis convenit dieta tenuissima In the same year he was senior proctor, and in 1658 he graduated M.D., being incorporated M.D. at Oxford on 13 July 1669. He was elected public orator at Cambridge on 5 March 1674, ahead of Isaac Newton, and held office till 9 July 1681.

In 1677 Paman went to reside in Lambeth Palace with Archbishop Sancroft. On 21 June 1679 he was appointed Professor of Physic at Gresham College, and on 1 December 1679 he was elected Fellow of the Royal Society. In 1683 he was admitted a candidate at the College of Physicians, and elected a fellow on 12 April 1687. He graduated LL.D. at Cambridge in 1684, and was thereupon appointed master of the faculties by Sancroft. He resigned his professorship on 21 June 1689. When Sancroft declined the oaths to William III and left Lambeth, Paman also declined, and gave up his mastership of the faculties.

He went to live in the parish of St Paul's, Covent Garden, where he died in June 1695; he was buried in the parish church. He was rich, and, after providing for his relations, left sums of money and books to St. John's College, to Emmanuel College, to the College of Physicians, and to his native parish.

== Works ==
Eight Latin letters written by him as public orator were printed under the title Literae Academiae Cantabrigiensis ab Henrico Paman cum esset orator publicus scriptae.

A Latin letter by him to his friend Thomas Sydenham is published in Sydenham's works as a preface to the treatise De Luis Veneriae historià et curatione.
