= Christopher Stanger =

English physician

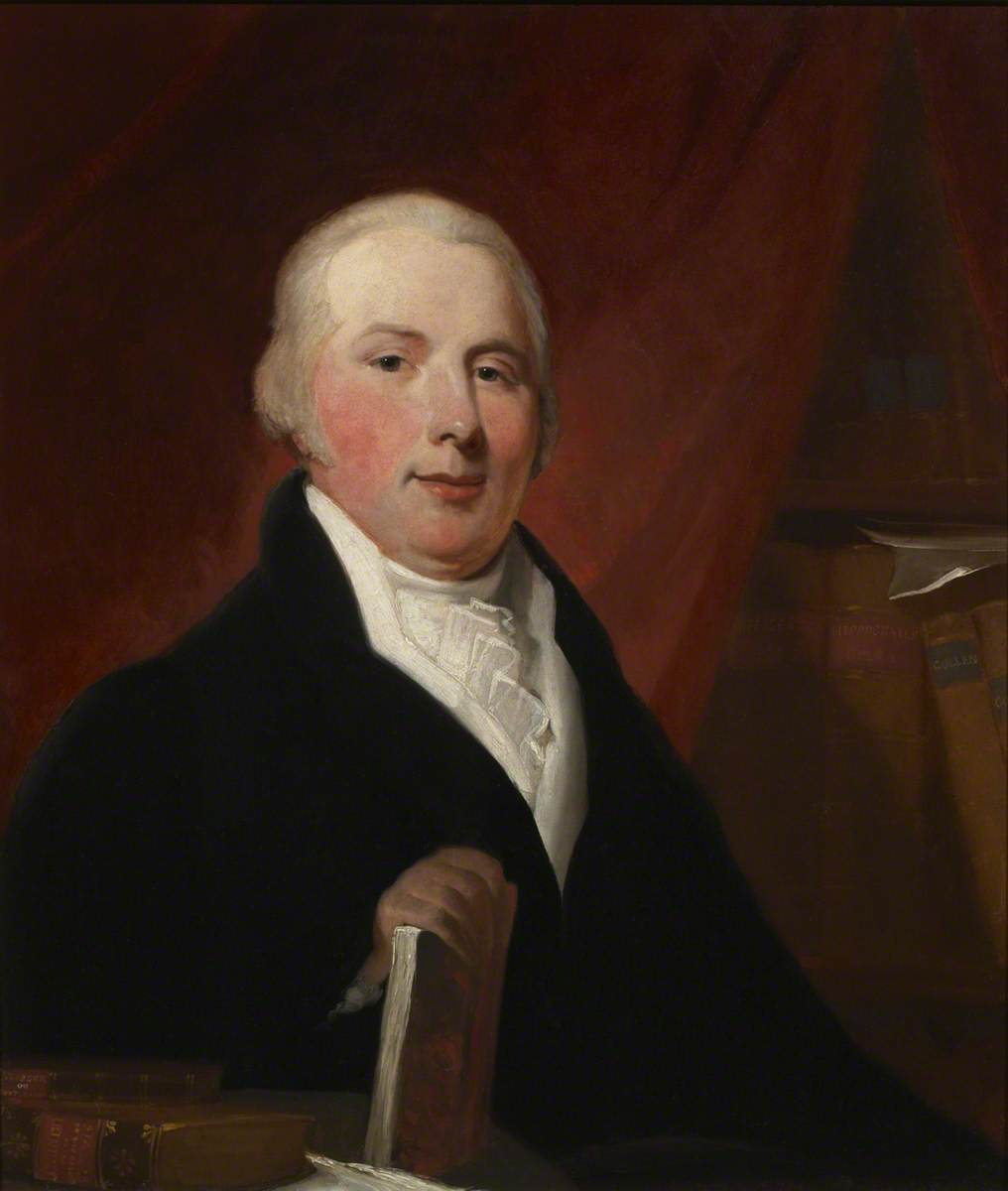
- Born: 1759
- Died: 21 September 1834 (aged 74–75); London
- Occupation: Physician

Christopher Stanger (1759 – 21 September 1834) was an English medical doctor.

== Biography ==
Stanger was the son of a merchant of Whitehaven. He was born in 1759. His family had for several centuries owned estates near Keswick, and a township to the west of Derwentwater once bore their name (Nicolson and Burn, History of Westmoreland and Cumberland, ii. 68). Stanger, after having been apprenticed to a surgeon at Newcastle-on-Tyne, graduated M.D. at Edinburgh on 24 June 1783. His dissertation bore the title ‘De iis quæ ad Sanitatem conservandam plurimum conferre videntur.’ He next studied for four years at the chief medical schools of the continent, including Paris, Vienna, Montpellier, Göttingen, and Leyden. On his return he established a practice in London, and was admitted L.R.C.P. on 30 September 1789. Next year he was appointed Gresham professor of medicine, and in 1792 became physician to the Foundling Hospital.

In June 1793 Stanger was chosen to act with John Cooke and William Charles Wells on a committee formed by the licentiates of the Royal College of Physicians to present an address to the college claiming to be admitted fellows. Among the signatories was John Aikin, the biographer, who was in consequence refused the use of the college library (Memoir, ed. Lucy Aikin, p. 178). The petitioners were excluded under a by-law which declared that fellows should be graduates of Oxford or Cambridge, despite the eminence of the medical school of Edinburgh. The college refused to receive the address, and Stanger applied to the law-courts. On 27 January 1796 the court of king's bench granted a rule to compel the president and fellows to show cause why they should not admit Stanger. On 23 April, when Erskine appeared for the defendants, the rule was discharged by Lord Chief-justice Kenyon on the ground of an informality in Stanger's application. The case was reopened in the autumn, and was argued by Adair, Law, Chambre, and Christian for the plaintiffs, with Erskine, Warren, and Gibbs for the defendants, 13–16 May 1797; but the court unanimously refused the mandamus. In 1798 Stanger appealed to the public in ‘A Justification of the Right of every well-educated Physician of fair character and mature age, residing within the Jurisdiction of the College of Physicians of London, to be admitted a fellow if competent.’ In this able pamphlet it was shown that Lord Mansfield had decided in 1767 that the college were bound under their charter to admit as fellows all duly qualified licentiates of whatever university. But Stanger's efforts produced little effect. Isaac Schomberg had unavailingly put forth a somewhat similar claim in 1753. Stanger, who possessed extensive attainments and great energy, also published ‘Remarks on the Necessity and Means of suppressing Contagious Fevers in the Metropolis,’ 1802, 12mo, and contributed a paper on ‘Coughs’ to the ‘Transactions of the Medical and Chirurgical Society.’ He died in London on 21 September 1834.
