= Henry Pemberton =

English physician (1694–1771)

- Born: 1694; London, England
- Died: 9 March 1771 (aged 76–77)
- Education: Leyden University
- Employer: St. Thomas's Hospital

Henry Pemberton (1694 – 9 March 1771) was an English physician and man of letters. He became Gresham Professor of Physic, and edited the third edition of Principia Mathematica.

== Life ==
Born in London, he received a general education in England, then went to Leyden University in August 1714. There he studied medicine under Herman Boerhaave, and read mathematical authors. From Leyden he passed to Paris to study anatomy, and bought a collection of mathematical works at the sale of the library of the Abbé Jean Gallois. He returned to London to attend St. Thomas's Hospital, but went back to Leyden in 1719 as the guest of Boerhaave, and graduated M.D. on 27 December of that year.

On his settling in London, Pemberton did not practise much, because of delicate health. He was, however, a writer on medical and general subjects. He became a Fellow of the Royal Society, and contributed papers to its Philosophical Transactions (vols. xxxii.–lxii.). One of these, a demonstration of the inefficiency in an attempted proof by Giovanni Poleni, of Leibniz's assertion that the force of descending bodies is proportional to the square of their velocity, was transmitted to Isaac Newton by Richard Mead, and gained for Pemberton Newton's friendship. Newton brought him a refutation by himself based on other principles. This was afterwards printed as a postscript to Pemberton's paper. Pemberton saw much of Newton in his old age.

On 24 May 1728 he was appointed Gresham professor of physic in succession to John Woodward. For seven years (1739–1746) he was chiefly employed in the preparation of the fifth London Pharmacopœia for the Royal College of Physicians; he performed all the chemical and pharmaceutical experiments. The work was published in 1746 as Translation and Improvement of the London Dispensatory, and he received from the college a gift of the copyright and a hundred guineas above the expenses incurred. Pemberton died on 9 March 1771.

== Works ==
Pemberton was employed by Newton to superintend the third edition of the ‘Philosophiæ Naturalis’. The new edition, which appeared in 1726, had a preface by Newton, in which Pemberton is characterised as ‘vir harum rerum peritissimus.’ In 1728 he published ‘A View of Sir I. Newton's Philosophy.’ It is dedicated to Robert Walpole, and is preceded by a preface containing the writer's recollections of the philosopher. In 1755 Pemberton published 'Elements of Newtonian Philosophy' in French for broader dissemination of Newtonian ideas beyond English-speaking countries. A German translation of pt. i. of the ‘View,’ by Salomon Maimon, appeared at Berlin in 1793. Pemberton's book was not remunerative, and was regarded as disappointing; George Lewis Scott, however, recommended it to Edward Gibbon.

In 1724 Pemberton assisted Mead in editing William Cowper's Myotomia Reformata. His ‘Scheme for a course of Chymistry to be performed at Gresham College’ appeared in 1731. Two courses of his lectures were published by his friend James Wilson—the first, in 1771, on chemistry; the second, in 1779, after Pemberton's death, on physiology.

In addition to these and some treatises left in manuscript, Pemberton wrote:

- ‘Dissertatio Physico-Medicinalis Inaug. de Facultate Oculi ad diversas Rerum Computatarum Distantias se accommodante,’ Leyden, 1719.
- ‘Epist. ad Amicum [viz. J. Wilson] de Rogeri Cotesii Inventis,’ 1722 (showing how Roger Cotes's theorems by ratios and logarithms may be done by circle and hyperbola).
- ‘Observations on Poetry, occasioned by Glover's "Leonidas,"’ 1738.

His Account of the Ancient Ode prefaces Gilbert West's Pindar, and a paper On the Dispute about Fluxions is in the second volume of Benjamin Robins's ‘Works.’

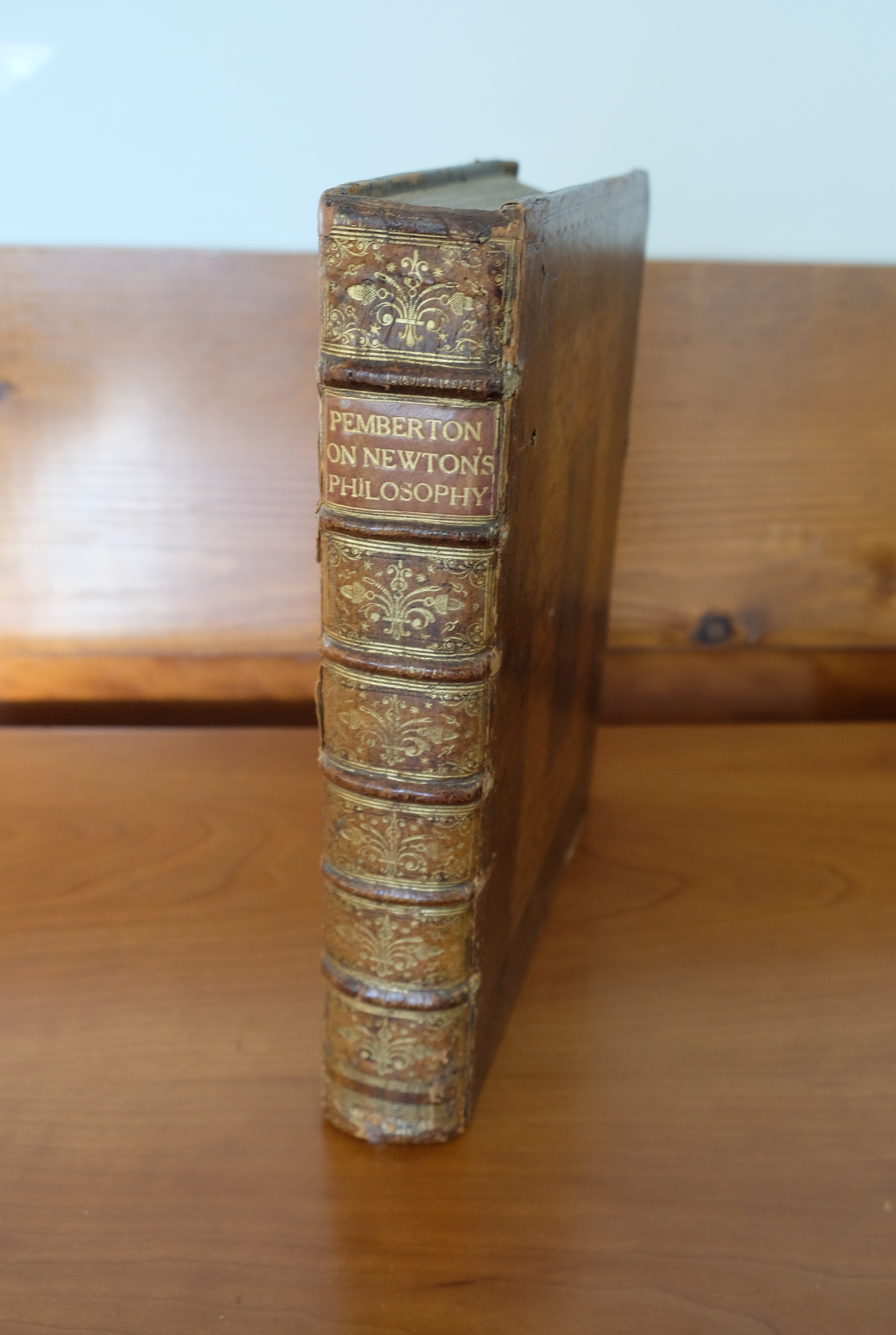
1728 copy of Pemberton's A view of Sir Isaac Newton's philosophy

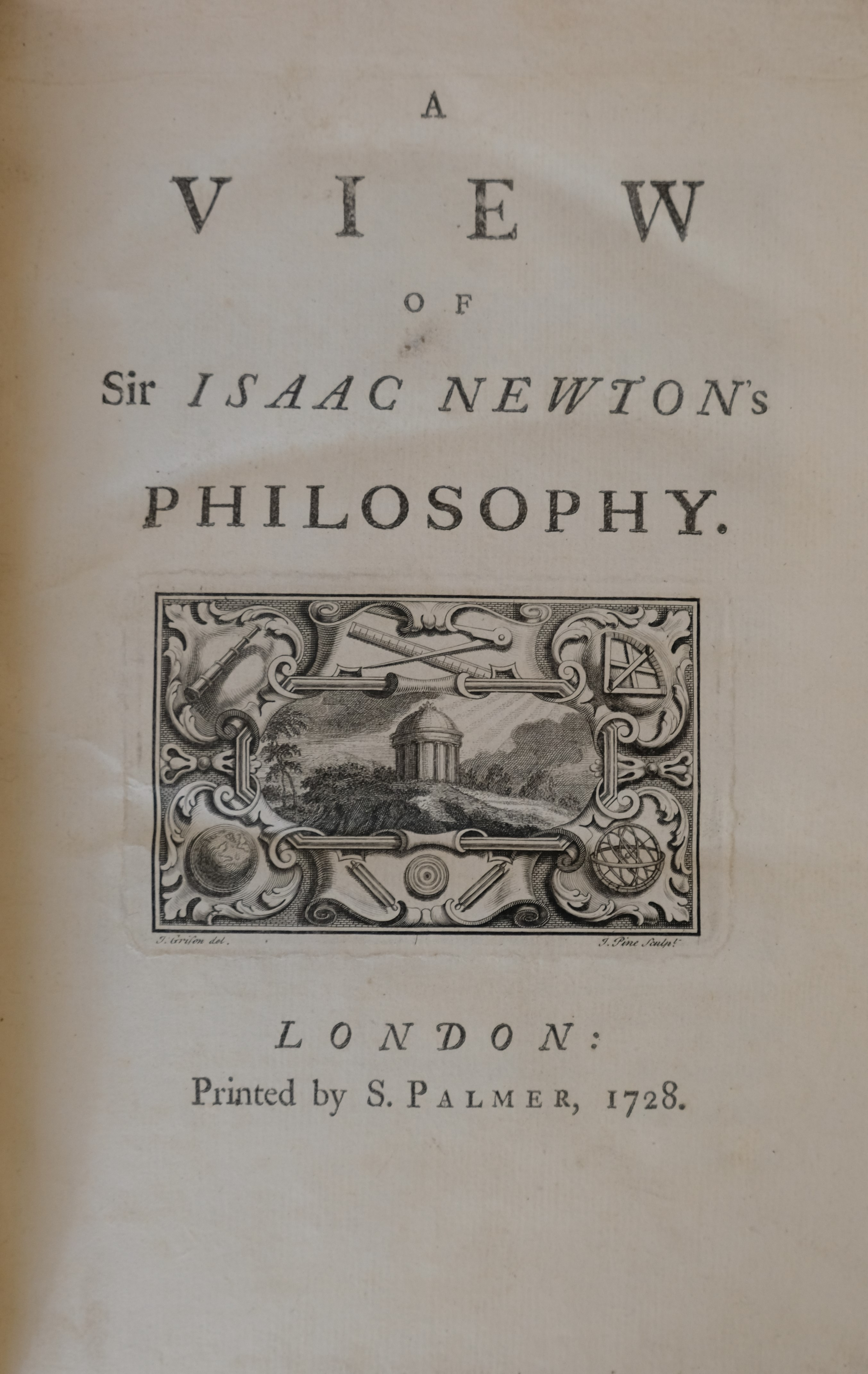
Title page to A view of Sir Isaac Newton's philosophy

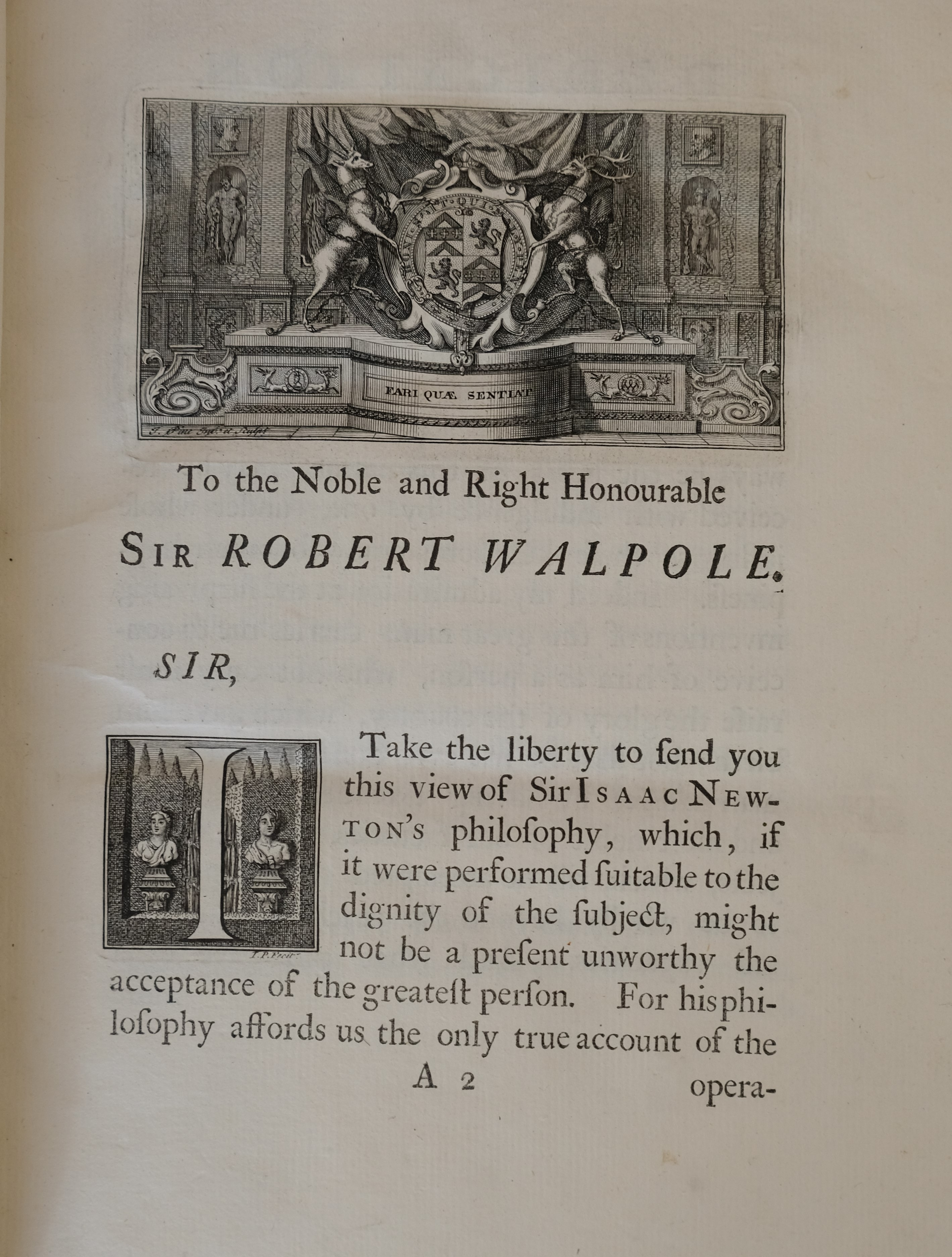
Dedication to A view of Sir Isaac Newton's philosophy, to Robert Walpole

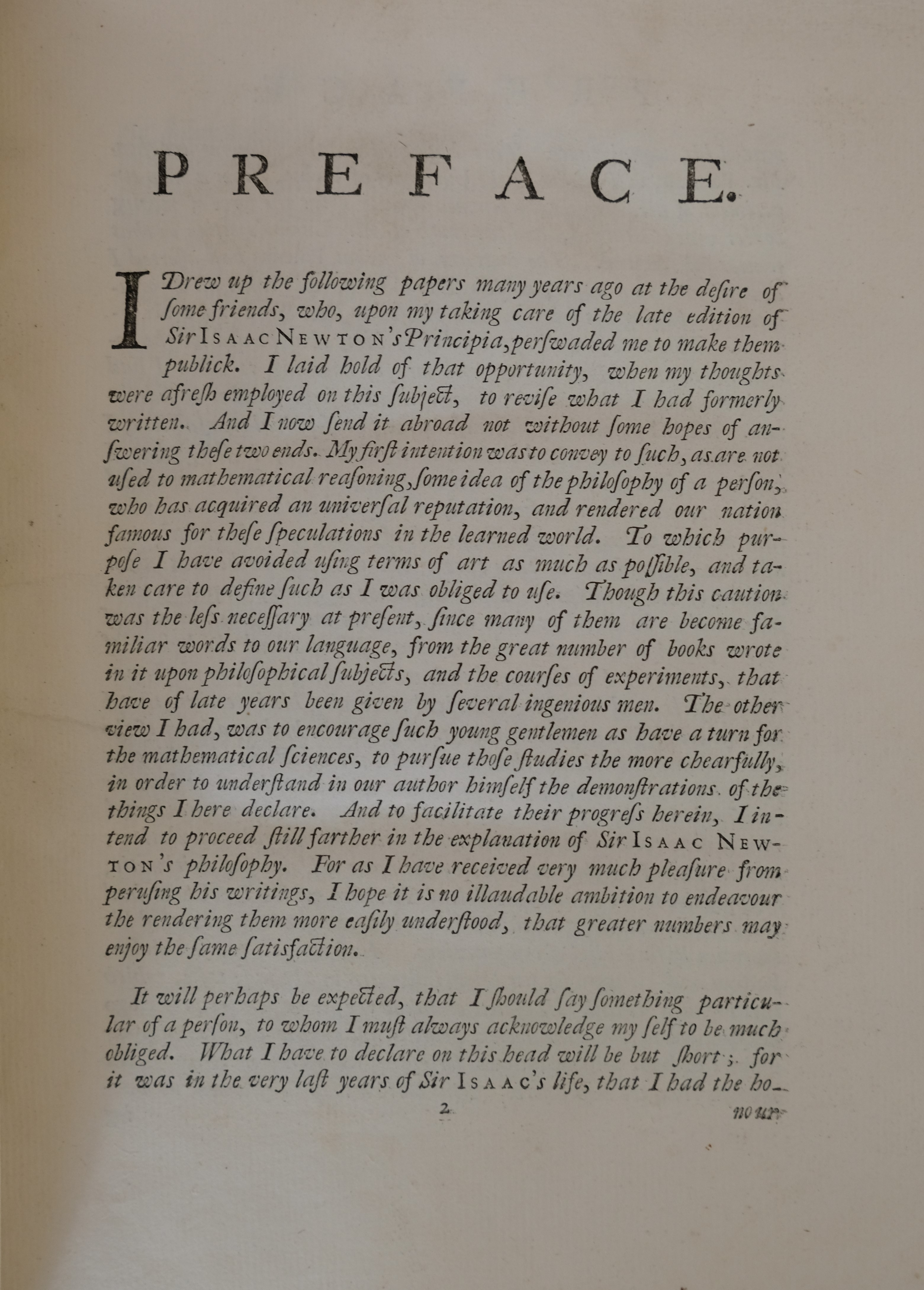
Preface to A view of Sir Isaac Newton's philosophy

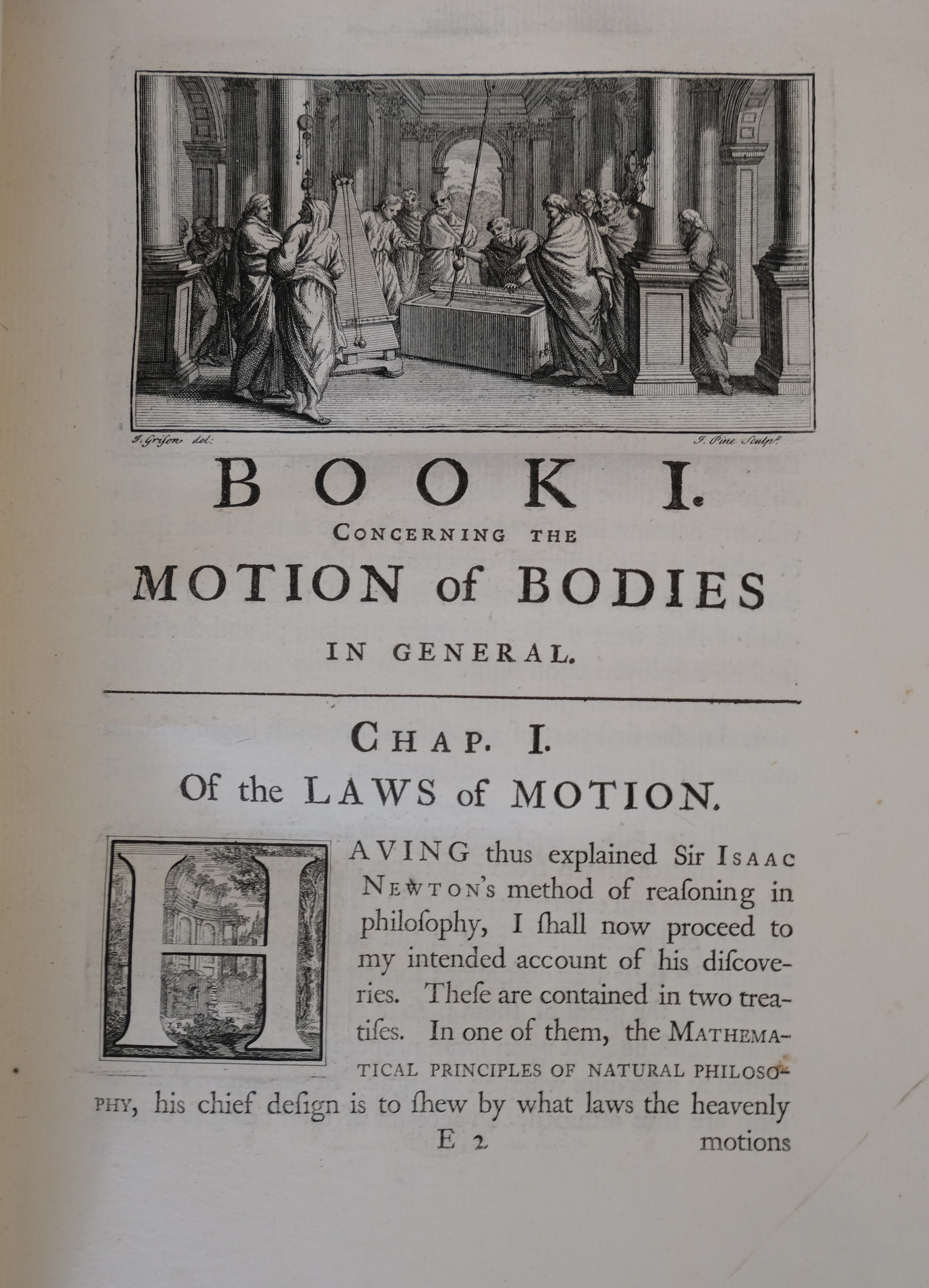
First page to A view of Sir Isaac Newton's philosophy
