= Thomas Sydenham =

English physician (1624–1689)

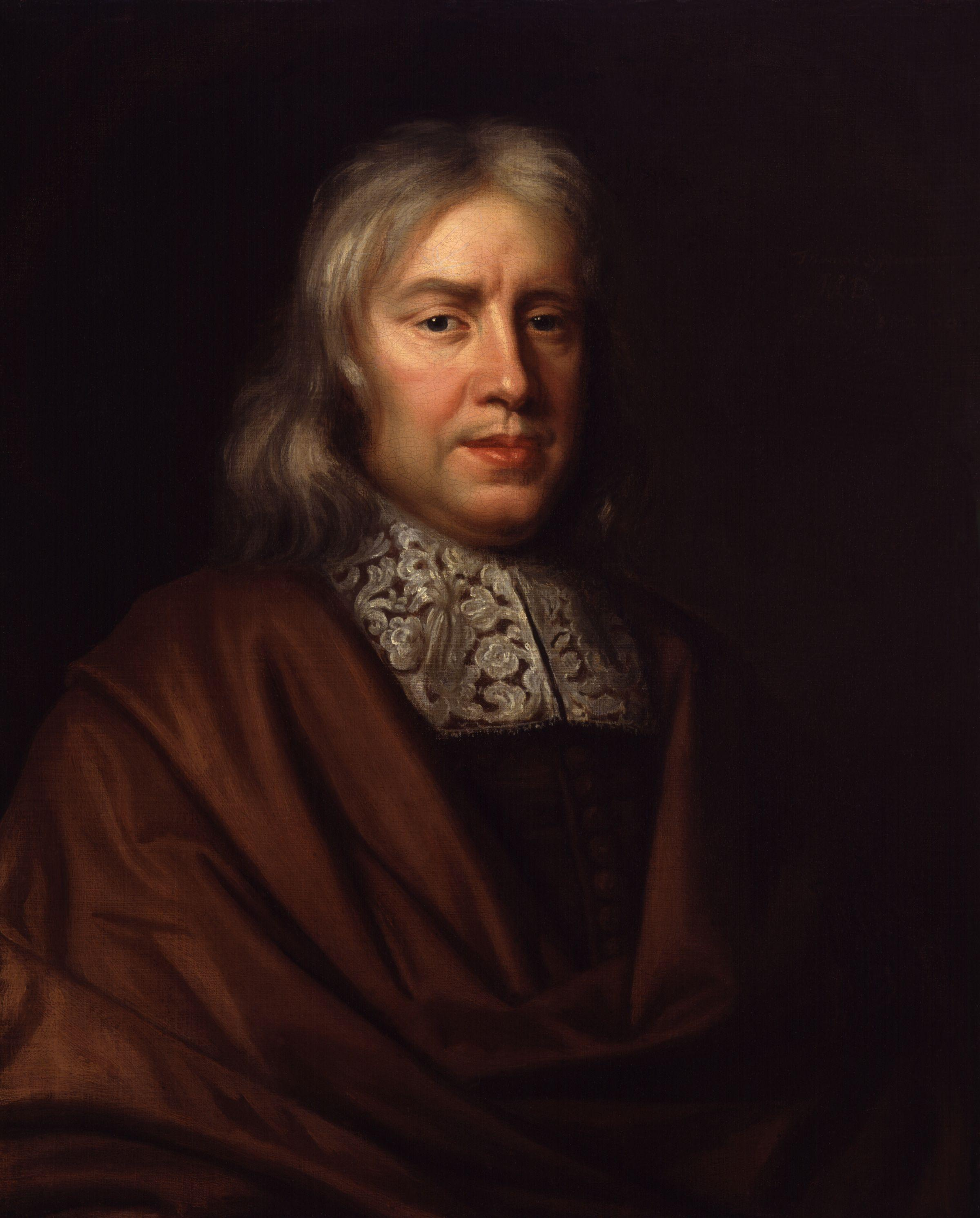
- Portrait of Sydenham by Mary Beale (1689)
- Born: 10 September 1624; Wynford Eagle, Dorset, England
- Died: 29 December 1689 (aged 65); Pall Mall, London, England
- Education: All Souls College, Oxford (MB, 1648); Pembroke College, Cambridge (MD, 1676)
- Known for: Clinical medicine
- Scientific career
- Fields: Medicine

Thomas Sydenham (/ˈsɪdənəm/; 10 September 1624 – 29 December 1689) was an English physician. He was the author of Observationes Medicae (1676) which became a standard textbook of medicine for two centuries so that he became known as 'The English Hippocrates'. Among his many achievements was the discovery of a disease, Sydenham's chorea, also known as St Vitus' Dance. To him is attributed the prescient dictum, "A man is as old as his arteries."

== Early life ==
Thomas Sydenham was born at Wynford Eagle in Dorset, where his father was a gentleman of property. His brother was Colonel William Sydenham.

At the age of eighteen Sydenham attended Magdalen Hall, Oxford; after a short period his college studies appear to have been interrupted, and he served for a time as an officer in the Parliamentarian army during the Civil War. He completed his Oxford course in 1648, graduating as bachelor of medicine, and about the same time he was elected a fellow of All Souls College. It was not until nearly thirty years later (1676) that he graduated as MD, not at Oxford, but at Pembroke Hall, Cambridge, where his eldest son was by then an undergraduate.

After 1648 he seems to have spent some time studying medicine at Oxford, where he cites the physician Thomas Coxe as an important influence - Coxe was caring for his brother. But he was soon back in military service, and in 1654 he received the sum of £600, as a result of a petition he addressed to Oliver Cromwell, pointing out the various arrears due to two of his brothers who had been killed and reminding Cromwell that he himself had also faithfully served the parliament with the loss of much blood.

In 1655 he resigned his fellowship at All Souls and married Mary Gee in his home village of Wynford Eagle. They had two sons, William (c. 1660–1738) and Henry (1668?–1741); another son, James, apparently died young. In 1663 he passed the examinations of the College of Physicians for their licence to practice in Westminster and 6 miles round; but it is probable that he had been settled in London for some time before that. This minimum qualification to practice was the single bond between Sydenham and the College of Physicians throughout the whole of his career.

He seems to have been distrusted by some members of the faculty because he was an innovator and something of a plain-dealer. In a letter to John Mapletoft he refers to a class of detractors "qui vitio statim vertunt si quis novi aliquid, ab illis non-prius dictum vel etiam inauditum, in medium proferat" ("Who by a technicality suddenly turn if something is new, if someone should disclose something not previously said or heard"); and in a letter to Robert Boyle, written the year before his death (and the only authentic specimen of his English composition that remains), he says, "I have the happiness of curing my patients, at least of having it said concerning me that few miscarry under me; but [I] cannot brag of my correspondency with some other of my faculty .... Though yet, in taken fire at my attempts to reduce practice to a greater easiness, plainness, and in the meantime letting the mountebank at Charing Cross pass unrailed at, they contradict themselves, and would make the world believe I may prove more considerable than they would have me."

Sydenham attracted to his support some of the most discriminating men of his time, such as Boyle and John Locke. His religious views have been described as an early form of natural theology.

== Works and innovations ==
=== Published works ===
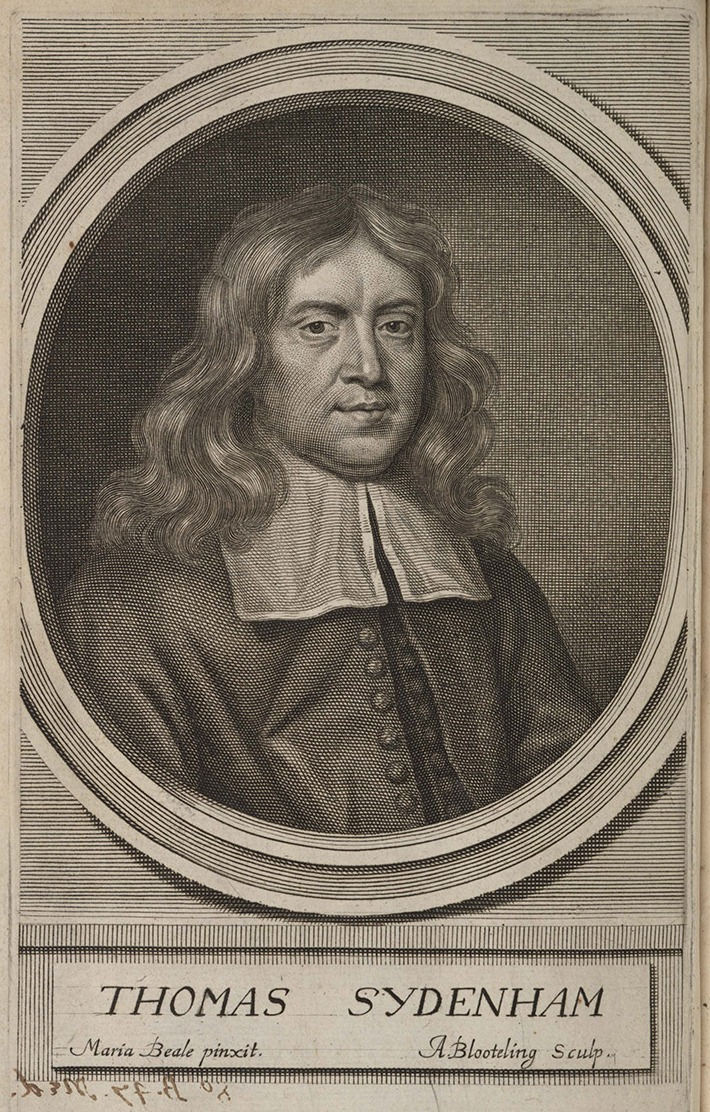
Engraving by Abraham Blooteling after the Mary Beale portrait; published as the frontispiece in a later edition of his Observationes medicinae

His first book, Methodus curandi febres (The Method of Curing Fevers), was published in 1666; a second edition, with an additional chapter on the plague, in 1668; and a third edition, further enlarged and bearing the better-known title of Observationes medicae (Observations of Medicine), in 1676. His next publication was in 1680 in the form of two Epistolae responsoriae (Letters & Replies), the one, "On Epidemics", addressed to Robert Brady, Regius Professor of Physic at Cambridge, and the other, "On the Lues venerea", (On Venereal Diseases) to Henry Paman, public orator at Cambridge and Gresham Professor of Physic in London.

In 1682 he published another Dissertatio epistolaris (Dissertation on the Letters), on the treatment of confluent smallpox and on hysteria, addressed to Dr William Cole of Worcester. The Tractatus de podagra et hydrope (The Management of Arthritis and Dropsy) came out in 1683, and the Schedula monitoria de novae febris ingressu (The Schedule of Symptoms of the Newly Arrived Fever) in 1686. His last completed work, Processus integri (The Process of Healing), is an outline sketch of pathology and practice; twenty copies of it were printed in 1692, and, being a compendium, it has been republished more often both in England and in other countries than any other of his writings separately. A fragment on pulmonary consumption was found among his papers. His collected writings occupy about 600 pages 8vo, in the Latin, translated into that language by various scholars.

=== Father of English medicine ===
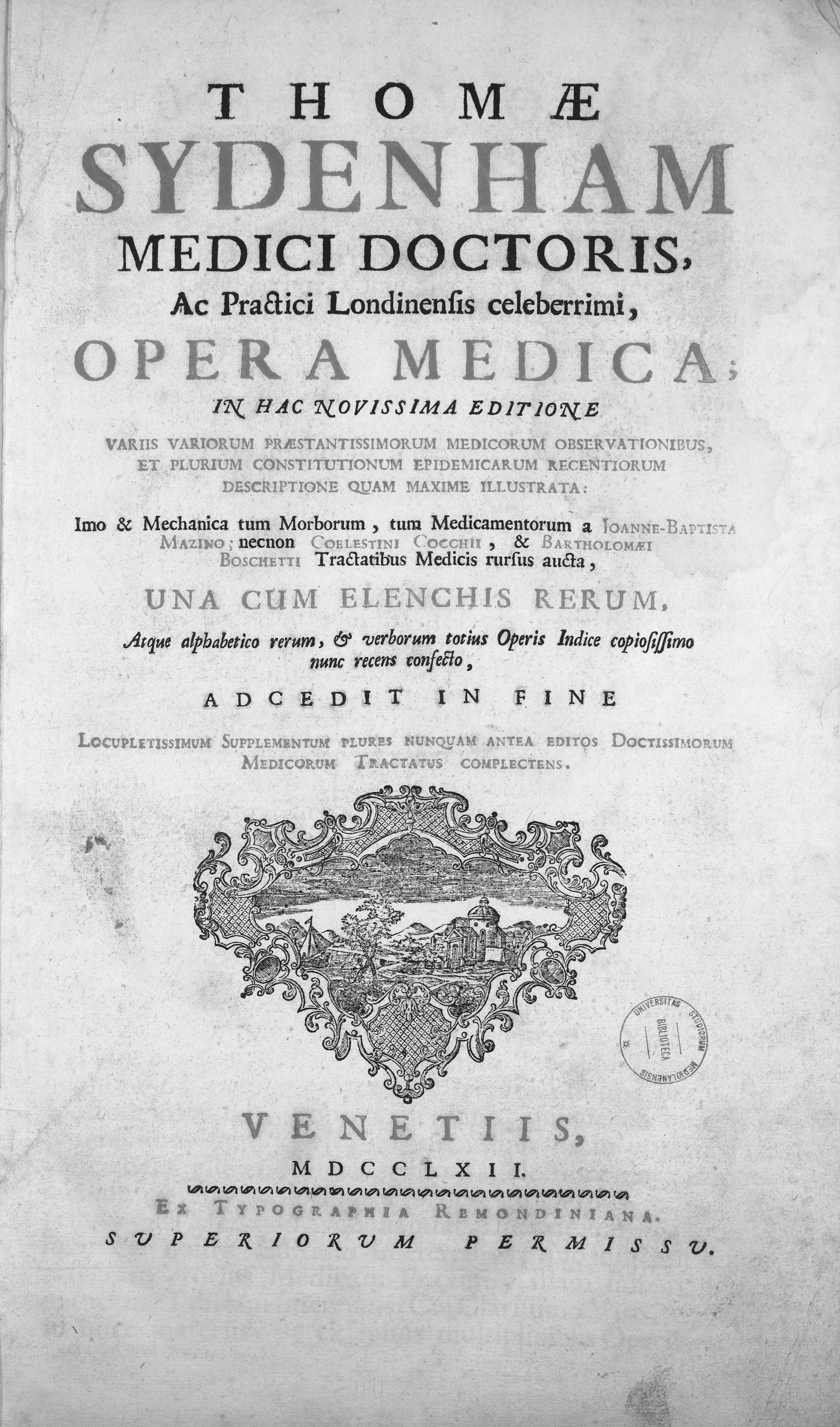
Opera medica

Although Sydenham was a successful practitioner and witnessed, besides foreign reprints, more than one new edition of his various treatises called for in his lifetime, his fame as the father of English medicine, or the English Hippocrates, was posthumous. For a long time he was held in vague esteem for the success of his cooling (or rather expectant) treatment of smallpox, for his laudanum (the first form of a tincture of opium), and for his advocacy of the use of "Peruvian bark" in "quartan agues" (in modern terms, the use of quinine-containing cinchona bark for treatment of malaria caused by Plasmodium malariae). There were, however, those among his contemporaries who understood something of Sydenham's importance in larger matters than details of treatment and pharmacy, among them Richard Morton and Thomas Browne who owned copies of several of Sydenham's books.

But the attitude of the academical medicine of the day is doubtless indicated in Martin Lister's use of the term sectaries for Sydenham and his admirers, at a time (1694) when the leader had been dead five years. If there were any suspicion that the opposition to him was quite other than political, it would be set at rest by the testimony of Dr Andrew Brown, who went from Scotland to inquire into Sydenham's practice and has incidentally revealed what was commonly thought of it at the time, in his Vindicatory Schedule concerning the New Cure of Fevers. In the series of Harveian Orations at the College of Physicians, Sydenham is first mentioned in the oration of Dr John Arbuthnot (1727), who styles him "aemulus Hippocratis" ("rival of Hippocrates"). Herman Boerhaave, the Leyden professor, was wont to speak of him in his class (which had always some pupils from England and Scotland) as "Angliae lumen, artis Phoebum, veram Hippocratici viri speciem" ("The light of England, the skill of Apollo, the true face of Hippocrates"). Albrecht von Haller also marked one of the epochs in his scheme of medical progress with the name of Sydenham. He is indeed famous because he inaugurated a new method and a better ethics of practice, the worth and diffusive influence of which did not become obvious (except to those who were on the same line with himself, such as Morton) until a good many years afterwards. It remains to consider briefly what his innovations were.

First and foremost he did the best he could for his patients, and made as little as possible of the mysteries and traditional dogmas of the craft. Stories told of him are characteristic: Called to a gentleman who had been subjected to the lowering treatment, and finding him in a pitiful state of hysterical upset, he conceived that this was occasioned partly by his long illness, partly by the previous evacuations, and partly by emptiness. "I therefore ordered him a roast chicken and a pint of canary." A gentleman of fortune he diagnosed with hypochondria was at length told he could do no more for him, but that there was living at Inverness a certain Dr Robertson who had great skill in cases like his; the patient journeyed to Inverness full of hope, and, finding no doctor of the name there, came back to London full of rage, but cured withal of his complaint.

Of a piece with this is his famous advice to Sir Richard Blackmore. When Blackmore first engaged in the study of physic he inquired of Dr Sydenham what authors he should read, and was directed by that physician to Don Quixote, which, said he, "is a very good book; I read it still." There were cases, he tells us, in his practice where "I have consulted my patients' safety and my own reputation most effectually by doing nothing at all."

In 1679, Sydenham gave Whooping cough the name pertussis, meaning a violent cough of any type. A zealous Puritan, "he rejected on religious grounds attempts such as pathological anatomy and microscopic analysis to uncover the hidden causes of disease," arguing that "God only gave man the ability to perceive the outer nature of things with his senses."

=== Quotations and Attributions ===
"Of all the remedies it has pleased almighty God to give man to relieve his suffering, none is so universal and so efficacious as opium."

"A man is as old as his arteries."

"I confidently affirm that the greater part of those who are supposed to have died of gout, have died of the medicine rather than the disease - a statement in which I am supported by observation."

"For humble individuals like myself, there is one poor comfort, which is this, viz. that gout, unlike any other disease, kills more rich men than poor, more wise men than simple. Great kings, emperors, generals, admirals, and philosophers have all died of gout. Hereby Nature shows her impartiality: since those whom she favors in one way she afflicts in another - a mixture of good and evil pre-eminently adapted to our frail mortality."

"It becomes every man who purposes to give himself to the care of others, seriously to consider the four following things: First, that he must one day give an account to the Supreme Judge of all the lives entrusted to his care. Secondly, that all his skill, and knowledge, and energy as they have been given him by God, so they should be exercised for his glory, and the good of mankind, and not for mere gain or ambition. Thirdly, and not more beautifully than truly, let him reflect that he has undertaken the care of no mean creature, for, in order that he may estimate the value, the greatness of the human race, the only begotten Son of God became himself a man, and thus ennobled it with his divine dignity, and far more than this, died to redeem it. And fourthly, that the doctor being himself a mortal man, should be diligent and tender in relieving his suffering patients, inasmuch as he himself must one day be a like sufferer."

The aphorism Primum non nocere (First, do no harm), often misattributed to Hippocrates, is attributed to Sydenham in a book written by the English surgeon Thomas Inman, but this attribution is not authenticated by Sydenham's available works.

=== Nosology ===
Sydenham's fundamental idea was to take diseases as they presented themselves in nature and to draw up a complete picture (Krankheitsbild of the Germans) of the objective characters of each. Most forms of ill-health, he insisted, had a definite type, comparable to the types of animal and vegetable species. The conformity of type in the symptoms and course of a malady was due to the uniformity of the cause. The causes that he dwelt upon were the evident and conjunct causes, or, in other words, the morbid phenomena; the remote causes he thought it vain to seek after.

Acute diseases, such as fevers and inflammations, he regarded as a wholesome conservative effort or reaction of the organism to meet the blow of some injurious influence operating from without; in this he followed the Hippocratic teaching closely as well as the Hippocratic practice of watching and aiding the natural crises. Chronic diseases, on the other hand, were a depraved state of the humours, mostly due to errors of diet and general manner of life, for which we ourselves were directly accountable. Hence his famous dictum: "acutos dico, qui ut plurimum Deum habent authorem, sicut chronici ipsos nos" ("I say what hurts, most over which God has authority, just like we ourselves over the chronic").

Sydenham's nosological method is essentially the modern one, except that it lacked the morbid anatomy part, which was first introduced into the natural history of disease by Morgagni nearly a century later. In both departments of nosology, the acute and the chronic, Sydenham contributed largely to the natural history by his own accurate observation and philosophical comparison of case with case and type with type. The Observationes medicae and the first Epistola responsoria contain evidence of a close study of the various fevers, fluxes and other acute maladies of London over a series of years, their differences from year to year and from season to season, together with references to the prevailing weather, the whole body of observations being used to illustrate the doctrine of the epidemic constitution of the year or season, which he considered to depend often upon inscrutable telluric causes. The type of the acute disease varied, he found, according to the year and season, and the right treatment could not be adopted until the type was known.

There had been nothing quite like this in medical literature since the Hippocratic treatise, On Airs, Waters and Places; and there are probably some germs of truth in it still undeveloped, although the modern science of epidemiology has introduced a whole new set of considerations. Among other things Sydenham is credited with the first diagnosis of scarlatina and with the modern definition, of chorea (in Sched. monit.). After smallpox, the diseases to which he refers most are hysteria and gout, his description of the latter (from the symptoms in his own person) being one of the classical pieces of medical writing. While Sydenham's natural history method has doubtless been the chief ground of his great posthumous fame, there can be no question that another reason for the admiration of posterity was that which is indicated by RG Latham, when he says, "I believe that the moral element of a liberal and candid spirit went hand in hand with the intellectual qualifications of observation, analysis and comparison."

== Death and legacy ==
Hardly anything is known of Sydenham's personal history in London. He died at his house in Pall Mall on 29 December 1689, aged 65.

Sydenham is buried in St James's Church, Piccadilly, where a mural slab was put up by the College of Physicians in 1810.

A memorial stone dedicated to Sydenham can be found halfway up the staircase of St James's Church, Piccadilly.

In the nineteenth century, professional associations of physicians were named in Sydenham's honor; they published medical books, arranged lectures, and so forth. The first was the Sydenham Society (1843–1857), followed by the New Sydenham Society (1857–1907).

Sydenham's work and achievements, as detailed earlier herein, gave him a lasting influence on medicine, causing some people to call him 'The English Hippocrates' and 'the father of English medicine'.

== Biographies ==
Among the lives of Sydenham are one (anonymous) by Samuel Johnson in John Swan's translation of his works (London, 1742), another by C. G. Kühn in his edition of his works (Leipzig, 1827), and a third by Robert Gordon Latham in his translation of his works published in London by the Sydenham Society in 1848. See also Frédéric Picard, Sydenham, sa vie, ses œuvres (Paris, 1889), and Joseph Frank Payne, Thomas Sydenham (London, 1900). Dr John Brown's Locke and Sydenham, in Hores subsecivae (Edinburgh, 1858), is of the nature of eulogy. Many collected editions of his works have been published, as well as translations into English, German, French and Italian. William Alexander Greenhill published the Latin text (London, 1844, Syd. Soc.).

The most interesting summary of doctrine and practice by the author himself is the introduction to the 3rd edition of Observationes medicae (1676). A colleague, Dr John Browne, described him as "the prince of practical medicine, whose character is as beautiful and as genuinely English as his name".
