= John William Bailey =

British painter

John William Bailey (27 April 1831 – 20 May 1914) was a British miniature painter. He was born in London the son of a tanner and was educated at Stratford-on-Avon.

Bailey received artistic training under William Essex, and executed portraits and enamels of dogs. His work was exhibited at the Royal Academy for three decades (1859–1889) and his work is held in the V&A. He produced commissions for the Rajah of Kolapore, whilst that prince was visiting England. Bailey died aged eighty-three.
