= Christopher Dye =

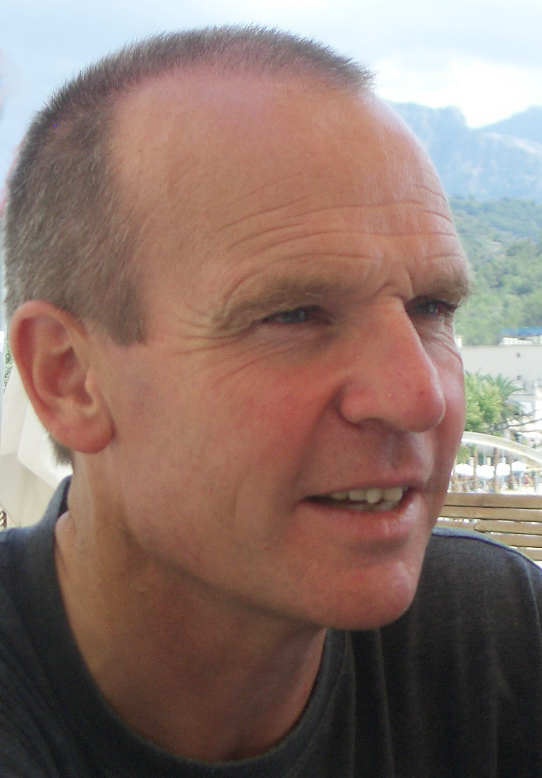
- Born: Belfast, Northern Ireland
- Citizenship: British, Irish, French
- Education: University of York; University of Oxford
- Awards: Fellow of the Royal Society
- Scientific career
- Fields: Epidemiology; Public Health

Christopher Dye FRS, FMedSci is a biologist, epidemiologist and public health specialist. He is Emeritus Professor of Epidemiology at the University of Oxford and formerly Director of Strategy at the World Health Organization.

== Career ==
Chris Dye trained as a biologist and ecologist (BA University of York) but postgraduate research on mosquitoes (DPhil University of Oxford) led towards epidemiology and public health. Based at Imperial College and the London School of Hygiene and Tropical Medicine from 1982 to 1996, he studied bloodsucking insects as vectors of leishmaniasis, malaria and onchocerciasis in Africa, Asia and South America, and domestic and wild animals as reservoirs of human infection and disease.

Joining the World Health Organization in 1996, he developed ways of analyzing the vast quantities of routine surveillance data (big data) collected by government health departments worldwide─extracting signal from noise to devise better methods for understanding and controlling tuberculosis, malaria, and Ebola and Zika viruses. From 2006 to 2009, he was also Gresham Professor of Physic (and other biological sciences), 35th in a lineage of professors that have given public lectures in the City of London since 1597.

As WHO Director of Strategy 2014–2018, he served as science advisor to the Director General, oversaw the production and dissemination of health information by WHO press and libraries, and coordinated WHO's work on health and the Sustainable Development Goals. He is currently Emeritus Professor of Epidemiology at the University of Oxford, where his research focuses on how choices and decisions are made for public and personal health. He has been Epidemiology Advisor to the Chinese Center for Disease Control and Prevention (as 戴诗磊), Gresham Professor of Physic, a member (trustee) of Council of The Royal Society and the University of York, a Visiting Fellow of All Souls College, Oxford and the Oxford Martin School, and a long-time member of the Board of Reviewing Editors for the journal Science.

== Honours and awards ==
Dye is a Fellow of The Royal Society, the Royal Society of Biology and the UK Academy of Medical Sciences. He delivered the Inaugural George W. Comstock Tuberculosis Lecture at Johns Hopkins, the Inaugural Gilbert Omenn '61 Lecture in Science Policy at Princeton, the Southwood Memorial Lecture at Oxford and the last ever Snell Memorial Lecture at the British Thoracic Society.

== Selected publications ==
- Dye, C; Williams, BG (2010). "The Population Dynamics and Control of Tuberculosis". Science. 328 (5980): 856–861. Bibcode:2010Sci...328..856D. doi:10.1126/science.1185449. PMID 20466923. S2CID 20957832.
- World Health Organization (2013). Research for Universal Health Coverage. The World Health Report 2013.
- WHO Ebola Response Team; et al. (2014). "Ebola Virus Disease in West Africa — the First 9 Months of the Epidemic and Forward Projections". New England Journal of Medicine. 371 (16): 1481–1495. doi:10.1056/NEJMoa1411100. PMC 4235004. PMID 25244186.
- Dye, C (2015). The Population Biology of Tuberculosis. Princeton University Press ISBN 978-0-691-15462-6. Chinese edition 结核病种群生物学 published in 2017.
- Broutet, N; et al. (2016). "Zika Virus as a Cause of Neurologic Disorders" (PDF). New England Journal of Medicine. 374 (16): 1506–9. doi:10.1056/NEJMp1602708. PMID 26959308.
- WHO Ebola Response Team; et al. (2016). "After Ebola in West Africa — Unpredictable Risks, Preventable Epidemics" (PDF). New England Journal of Medicine. 375 (6): 587–596. doi:10.1056/NEJMsr1513109. hdl:10044/1/42037. PMID 27509108.
- de Oliveira, WK; et al. (2017). "Zika Virus Infection and Associated Neurologic Disorders in Brazil". New England Journal of Medicine. 376 (16): 1591–1593. doi:10.1056/NEJMc1608612. PMC 5544116. PMID 28402236.
- Tian, H; et al. (2020). "An investigation of transmission control measures during the first 50 days of the COVID-19 epidemic in China". Science. 368 (6491): 638–642. Bibcode:2020Sci...368..638T. doi:10.1126/science.abb6105. PMC 7164389. PMID 32234804.
- Buss, L; et al. (2020). "Three-quarters attack rate of SARS-CoV-2 in the Brazilian Amazon during a largely unmitigated epidemic". Science. 371 (6526): 288–292. doi:10.1126/science.abe9728. PMC 7857406. PMID 33293339.
- Dye, C. (2022). "One Health as a catalyst for sustainable development". Nature Microbiology. 7 (4): 467–468. doi:10.1038/s41564-022-01076-1. PMID 35210574. S2CID 247106275.
- Boulos, L; et al. (2023). "Effectiveness of face masks for reducing transmission of SARS-CoV-2: a rapid systematic review". Philosophical Transactions of the Royal Society A. 381 (2257) 20230133. doi:10.1098/rsta.2023.0133. PMC 10446908.
- Dye, C (2024). Investing in Health and Wellbeing: When Prevention is Better than Cure. Oxford University Press, 2nd ed ISBN 9780198887133. Chinese edition published in 2026.
- Dye, C (2024). Snapshots of Science. My Take on Health, 1974-2024.

Further articles are listed by PubMed and Google Scholar. Science discussions and lectures have been broadcast by the BBC, Gresham College, YouTube, the British Academy, The Royal Society, the American Association for the Advancement of Science and the National Academy of Medicine.
