= Gresham Professor of Physic =

The Professor of Physic at Gresham College, London, gives free educational lectures to the general public, typically on medicine, health and related sciences. The college was founded for this purpose in 1597, when it created seven professorships; this was later increased to ten. Physic (the common term for medicine in this period) is one of the original professorships as set out by the will of Sir Thomas Gresham in 1575. The Professor of Physic is appointed in partnership with the Worshipful Company of Mercers.

Past Professors of Physic have included leading figures in medicine, public health, surgery and clinical science. Additionally, other eminent medical scientists and physicians were Gresham Professors of other disciplines, like Sir William Petty, one of the founders of demography, who served as Professor of Music from 1651.

== List of Gresham Professors of Physic ==
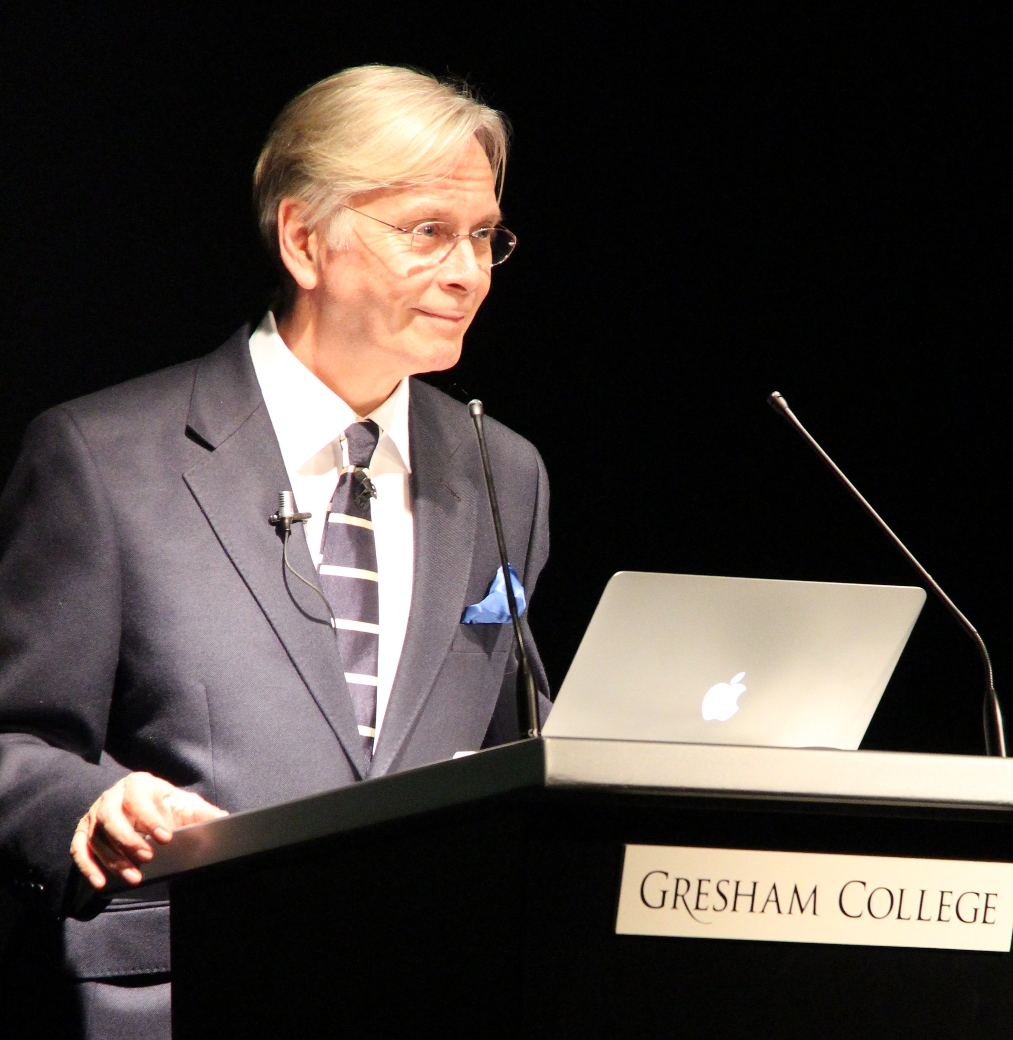
Professor Martin Elliott delivering a Gresham College lecture, October 2014

	Name	Started
1	Matthew Gwinne	March 1596 / 7
2	Peter Mounsell	Sept 1607
3	Thomas Winston	25 Oct 1615
4	Paul de Laune	13 June 1643
5	Thomas Winston	20 August 1652
6	Jonathan Goddard FRS	7 Nov 1655
7	John Mapletoft FRS	27 March 1675
8	Henry Paman FRS	21 June 1679
9	Edward Stillingfleet FRS	21 June 1689
10	John Woodward FRS	13 Jan 1692-1703
11	Henry Pemberton FRS	24 May 1728
12	Thomas Healde FRS	27 March 1771
13	Christopher Stanger	25 March 1789
14	Henry Herbert Southey FRS	24 Oct 1834
15	Henry Powell	27 July 1865
16	Edmund Symes-Thompson	5 July 1867
17	Fleming Mant Sandwith	14 March 1907
18	Sir Robert Armstrong-Jones	24 May 1918
19	Sir George Newman	26 July 1929
20	James Alison Glover	12 Oct 1934
21	Vincent Sutherland Hodson	13 April 1937
1939–45 Lectures in abeyance
22	Hamilton Hartridge FRS	6 June 1946
23	John Leonard d’Silva	1955
24	Arthur John Buller	1962
25	Invited lectures: H Harris and D V Davies	1964-65
26	J P Quilliam	1965
27	H C Stewart	1968
28	David Slome	1970-84?
29	John Daniel Griffiths	1986
30	Sir Kenneth L Stuart	1988
31	Francis Cox	1 Sept 1992
32	Susan Greenfield, Baroness Greenfield	1 Sept 1995
33	Hilary Rose and Steven Rose	1 Sept 1999
34	Keith Kendrick	1 Sept 2002
35	Christopher Dye FRS	1 Sept 2006
36	William Ayliffe	1 Sept 2009
37	Martin Elliott	1 Sept 2014
38	Sir Chris Whitty	2018
39	Robin May	2022
40	Matthew Higgins	2026
