= China Tribunal =

Inquiry into forced organ harvesting in China

The China Tribunal was a non-governmental "people's tribunal" established to examine allegations of forced organ harvesting from prisoners of conscience in the People's Republic of China and to consider whether any international crimes were committed. It was headquartered in London. Chaired by Geoffrey Nice, it conducted public hearings and received testimony from witnesses, experts, and investigators. The tribunal had no formal legal authority in any domestic or international court system.

It released its judgment in June 2019, concluding that forced organ harvesting had been carried out for years throughout China on a significant scale and that Falun Gong practitioners had been the principal source of organs.

== Formation and members ==
In 2016, members of the International Coalition to End Transplant Abuse in China (ETAC) asked Geoffrey Nice to write an opinion about the issues that the tribunal was later to consider; Nice advised that a body of several people would be better able to consider the facts and law.

In 2017 ETAC registered as an Australian charity whose founders included American journalist Ethan Gutmann, activist Susie Hughes, Canadian lawmaker David Kilgour, and Canadian legal counsel David Matas.

In 2018 ETAC convened the China Tribunal, commissioning Nice as its chair. Nice had served as the lead prosecutor at the trial of Slobodan Milošević in the International Criminal Tribunal for the Former Yugoslavia. According to the tribunal, other members included British surgeon Martin Elliott, Iranian lawyer Shadi Sadr, and American historian Arthur Waldron.

The tribunal notes that although "a minority of those working in and for ETAC are themselves Falun Gong practitioners", the organisation has campaigned to end forced organ harvesting throughout China and to protect the human rights of all prisoners of conscience who are at risk of having their organs forcibly extracted. The Tribunal states that it is independent from ETAC, "none of the members of the Tribunal, Counsel to the Tribunal, the editor or the volunteer lawyers working with Counsel to the Tribunal is a Falun Gong practitioner or has any special interest in Falun Gong."

== Aims and mandate ==
The China Tribunal Charter set out the mandate and aims of the tribunal. The China Tribunal members were mandated to "consider the evidence regarding forced organ harvesting from prisoners of conscience in China and determine whether international crimes have been, and continue to be, committed."

The method of work included to: "receive submissions on applicable standards and available remedies." Legal submissions on application of international law were received from Edward Fitzgerald and N. Sivanathan.

Regarding transparency, the Tribunal Charter stipulates that "The Tribunal will be conducted with a commitment to transparency regarding the evidence it has examined and the sources it has consulted."

The China Tribunal Charter also set out specific questions for the tribunal to address:

1. "Given the available evidence about past and continuing forced organ harvesting from prisoners of conscience in China, have international crimes been committed?"
2. "If so, what legal and other actions should be taken by the international community? In responding to these questions, the Tribunal should consider the extent to which alleged perpetrators of forced organ harvesting can be named under relevant legislation and the effect of sovereign immunity on protecting wrongdoers from civil suits."
3. "The Tribunal is also urged to consider the responsibilities of international hospitals, universities, doctors, professional societies, medical researchers, pharmaceutical and biotech companies, medical journals and publishers regarding collaboration with their Chinese counterparts and Chinese transplant professionals, whether such collaboration might amount to complicity in forced organ harvesting, what constraints should apply to any future collaboration and to make recommendations regarding existing or proposed professional and legal sanctions."

== Hearings and evidence presented ==
The China Tribunal held 5 days of public hearings in London in December 2018 and April 2019, in which over 50 fact witnesses, experts and investigators testified including survivors of detention, family members of victims, medical experts and scholars.

During the hearings and review, the tribunal considered undercover telephone call recordings in which representatives of Chinese hospitals spoke of organ availability, expert testimony from medical professionals, and statistical analyses of transplant figures and donor sources.

=== Testimonies and submissions ===
Witness testimonies included Falun Gong practitioners and Uyghurs who described forced medical testing, including organ scans, and abuse in custody such as torture, rape, and psychological abuse. Testimonies from experts included analysis of organ transplant and donation data, Chinese medical and government documents of policy and practice, and a statistical analysis of official Chinese records such as bed utilization rates, hospital revenue and surgical teams that claimed 60,000 – 100,000 transplants had been performed each year.

The tribunal subjected academic submissions and reports to independent scrutiny, including a review by a leading UK statistician of a study published in BMC Medical Ethics, which showed that China's organ donation figures had been manipulated and did not reflect the real numbers.

Phone call recordings submitted to the tribunal, in which government officials and surgeons stated that organs were available on demand, including from Falun Gong practitioners, were reviewed at the Tribunal's request by independent academic commentators. In one phone call, which the China Tribunal had forensically examined, the former PLA Minister for Health, Bai Shuzhong, stated that ex-CCP general secretary Jiang Zemin directly ordered the killing of Falun Gong practitioners for their organs.

The tribunal invited the Chinese government, along with others who had previously expressed scepticism regarding allegations of forced organ harvesting, to submit evidence and participate in the hearings. These invitations were issued before the tribunal reached any conclusions, but no response was received.

In addition, the tribunal reviewed publicly available exculpatory material. This included media statements and video footage of Chinese officials, such as transplant official Haibo Wang's response to the 2016 Update Report, and the Chinese government's written submission to the UN Committee Against Torture. Testimonies from international transplant surgeons were also considered, including Francis L. Delmonico's evidence before the U.S. Congressional-Executive Commission on China, and Jeremy Chapman's testimony before the Australian Senate, both of whom have participated in international collaborations with Chinese transplant authorities.

The tribunal further examined the Australian parliamentary report Compassion, Not Commerce, which investigated human organ trafficking and transplant tourism.

=== Reading material reviewed ===
The China Tribunal's Reading Material page lists seven categories of documents that tribunal members were required to review, including overview texts, documentary investigations, investigative documents, academic journal articles, and published reports from organisations and official bodies. It also contains exculpatory evidence—material submitted to counter or challenge the allegations.

== Judgment ==
On 17 June 2019, the China Tribunal pronounced its "final judgment" on organ harvesting in China, concluding that the Chinese Communist Party (CCP) was, beyond reasonable doubt, guilty of committing crimes against humanity against China's Uyghur Muslim and Falun Gong populations, and that removing hearts and other organs from living victims constituted one of the worst mass atrocities of this century.

The China Tribunal judgment stated: "In the long-term practice in the PRC of forced organ harvesting it was indeed Falun Gong practitioners who were used as a source – probably the principal source – of organs for forced organ harvesting." Adding that there was no evidence of the practice having been stopped and that the tribunal was satisfied that it continued.

The judgment was published on 1 March 2020.

== Aftermath ==
The tribunal's judgment, as well as its calls for the global medical and legal community to address the issue, was reported as a news article on The BMJ website. Its findings were also noted in a United States congressional hearing summary regarding organ transplant practices and concerns over unaccounted donor sources in China.

== See also ==
- Antireligious campaigns in China
