= Hamilton Hartridge =

Hamilton Hartridge FRS
- Born: 7 May 1886; London, England
- Died: 13 January 1976 (aged 89)
- Education: Harrow School, King's College, Cambridge, St George's Hospital, London
- Known for: Continuous flow apparatus
- Spouse: Kathleen Wilson
- Children: 4
- Scientific career
- Fields: vision, hearing, fast reaction kinetics
- Workplaces: University of Cambridge; St Bartholomew's Hospital, London; Medical Research Council

Hamilton Hartridge FRS (7 May 1886 – 13 January 1976) was a British eye physiologist and medical writer. Known for his ingenious experimentation and instrument construction abilities, he designed what is called the Hartridge Reversion Spectrometer. This was used for pioneering studies on haemoglobin oxygen-binding studies.

== Education and early career ==
Hartridge was educated at Harrow and King's College, Cambridge, where he became a fellow from 1912 to 1926. He graduated in medicine from St George's Hospital in 1914, serving during the war as an experimental officer at RNAS Kingsnorth. In 1916 he married Kathleen Wilson, and they later had four children together. After the war he stayed in Cambridge University as lecturer in special senses and senior demonstrator in physiology. He gained a reputation as an ingenious experimenter, constructing, for example, the continuous-flow apparatus for measuring the rates of very fast reactions, as well as working to revise established medical textbooks. The continuous-flow apparatus provided a solution to what at first sight might seem an impossible problem: how to measure processes on a time scale in milliseconds with equipment that required many seconds for each measurement. His research on the senses of bats identified their use of echolocation to navigate, and in 1920 he correctly proposed that bats use frequencies beyond the range of human hearing.

== Later career ==
From 1927 to 1947, he was professor of physiology at St Bartholomew's Hospital, and from 1947 to 1951 director of the vision research unit of the Medical Research Council. He was president of the Quekett Microscopical Club from 1951 to 1954 and he was elected an Honorary Member in 1952. He was Gresham Professor of Physic. In 1946 he delivered the Royal Institution Christmas Lectures entitled "Colours and how we see them".

The National Portrait Gallery holds a portrait of him.

== Works ==
- Chapter on the sense organs, in Ernest Henry Starling, Principles of human physiology, 3rd ed, London: J. & A. Churchill, 1920.
- Supplementary essay in William Pole, The philosophy of music, 6th ed., London, K. Paul, Trench, Trubner & Co.; New York, Harcourt, Brace & Co., 1924. The International Library of Psychology, Philosophy and Scientific Method.
- Bainbridge & Menzies' Essentials of physiology, 7th ed., 1929.
- Colours and how we see them, 1949.
- Recent advances in the physiology of vision, 1950.
