= Thomas Winston =

English physician

Thomas Winston (1576–1655) was an English physician.

== Life ==
He was the son of Thomas Winston, a carpenter of Painswick, Gloucestershire, and his wife Judith, daughter of Roger Lancaster of Hertfordshire. He graduated with an M.A. at Clare Hall, Cambridge in 1602, and continued as a fellow of that college till 1617. He then studied medicine at Padua, where he attended the lectures of Fabricius ab Aquapendente, and at Basel, where he became a pupil of Caspar Bauhin. He graduated with an M.D. at Padua and was incorporated as an M.D. at Cambridge in 1608.

He was admitted as a licentiate of the College of Physicians in London on 9 March 1610, a candidate or member on 10 September 1613, and was elected a fellow on 20 March 1615. He was ten times more censored between 1622 and 1637. He was an active member of the Virginia Company, regularly attending its meetings in London until October 1621 and acting as one of the editors of A Declaration of the State of the Colonie and Affaires in Virginia, published in 1620. He was elected Professor of Physic at Gresham College on 25 October 1615 and held office till 1642. He then went abruptly to France but returned in 1652. William Lenthall wrote to the Gresham committee on his behalf, and on 20 August 1652 he was restored to his professorship, which he held till his death. He had a large practice as a physician and always kept an apothecary, who followed him humbly. He died on 24 October 1655.

== Works ==
His works show anatomical reading as well as a practical acquaintance with the anatomy of man and of animals. He was well read in Galen and in Latin literature, and Meric Casaubon praised his learning. After his death his Anatomy Lectures were published in London in 1659 and 1664. He made no original discoveries, held the old erroneous opinion that there are openings in the septum between the ventricles, showed no acquaintance with William Harvey's work on the circulation of the blood, and believed that the arteries transmit vital spirit elaborated in the left ventricle as well as blood.
