= John Mapletoft =

English clergyman and physician

John Mapletoft (1631–1721) was an English clergyman and physician.

== Life ==
His father was Joshua Mapletoft, vicar of Margaretting and rector of Wickford, Essex, and his mother Susanna, daughter of John Collet by Susanna, sister of Nicholas Ferrar of Little Gidding, Huntingdonshire. She afterwards married James Chedley, and, dying on 31 October 1657, was buried at Little Gidding. John was born at Margaretting on 15 June 1631. On the death of his father in 1635 he was taken to the Little Gidding community, where he was brought up by Nicholas Ferrar, his godfather.

In 1647 he was sent by his uncle, Robert Mapletoft, to Westminster School, was entered as a pensioner at Trinity College, Cambridge, on 21 May 1648, and was elected to a Westminster scholarship there in 1649. He graduated B.A. in January 1652, M.A. in 1655, and became fellow of his college on 1 October 1653. He was incorporated B.A. at Oxford on 11 July 1654. On 12 May 1652 he was admitted a student of Gray's Inn. From 1658 to 1660 he was tutor to Jocelyne, son of Algernon Percy, 10th Earl of Northumberland. He then went abroad to study physic. His fellowship expired in 1662, and in 1663 he re-entered the earl's family in England. In 1667 he took his M.D. degree at Cambridge, and was incorporated M.D. at Oxford on 13 July 1669.

While practising in London he made the acquaintance of many of the noted men of the time, both physicians and theologians, and came much into contact with the Cambridge latitudinarians at the house of his kinsman, Thomas Firmin. With John Locke, whom he had known at Westminster School, he was for many years on terms of great intimacy. He is said to have introduced him to both Thomas Sydenham and John Tillotson. With Sydenham Mapletoft was for seven years closely associated in medical practice.

In 1670 he attended Arthur Capell, 1st Earl of Essex in his embassy to Denmark, and in 1672 was in France with the Dowager Duchess of Northumberland. In 1675 he was chosen Professor of Physic at Gresham College, and in 1676 was again in France with the dowager duchess, then the wife of the Hon. Ralph Montague. He retained his professorship at Gresham College till 10 October 1679, when he retired from medical practice and prepared himself for ordination. He had some scruples about subscribing to the Thirty-nine Articles, and consulted his friend Simon Patrick. But on 3 March 1683 he took both deacon's and priest's orders, having previously been presented to the rectory of Braybrooke in Northamptonshire. This living he held until 1686, and though non-resident was a benefactor to the place. On 4 January 1685 he was chosen lecturer at Ipswich, and on 10 January 1686, on his resigning Braybrooke, vicar of St. Lawrence Jewry in London, where he continued to preach till he was over eighty years of age. He also held the lectureship of St. Christopher for a short time from 1685. In 1689-90 he took the degree of D.D. at Cambridge, and henceforth devoted his life to religion and philanthropy.

Mapletoft was an original member of the Company of Adventurers to the Bahamas (4 September 1672), but, being abroad at the time, transferred his share to Locke. In the same year he was using his influence and purse in support of Isaac Barrow's scheme for building a library at Trinity College. He was elected a fellow of the Royal Society on 10 February 1676, was member of council in 1677, 1679, 1690, and 1692, and as long as he practised the medical profession took part in the discussions and experiments. He joined the Society for Promoting Christian Knowledge in July 1699, early in the second year of its existence. In this connection he was brought into contact with Robert Nelson, with whom he corresponded for some years. He was an original member and active supporter of the Society for the Propagation of the Gospel in Foreign Parts (incorporated by charter in 1701), a benefactor to the library and buildings of Sion College, of which he was president in 1707, and one of the commissioners of Greenwich Hospital.

The last ten years of Mapletoft's life were spent with his daughter, partly in Oxford and partly in Westminster. His mental and bodily health remained excellent till nearly the end. He died in Westminster on 10 November 1721, in the ninety-first year of his age, and was buried in the chancel of the church of St. Lawrence Jewry.

== Works ==
Mapletoft's published works, apart from single sermons, include:

- Select Proverbs (anon.), London, 1707.
- The Principles and Duties of the Christian Religion . . . with a Collection of suitable Devotions [also issued separately], London, 1710, 1712, 1719.
- Wisdom from Above (anon.), London, 1714, 2nd part, 1717.
- Placita Principalia, seu Sententiae perutiles e Dramaticis fere Poetis, London, 1714.
- Placita Principalia et Concilia, seu Sententiae perutiles Philosophorum, London, 1717, 1731.

The last two are selections from Greek authors with Latin translations, and were reprinted in 1731. In Appendix xv. to John Ward's 'Lives' (p. 120) are printed three Latin lectures by Mapletoft on the origin of the art of medicine and the history of its invention, under the title Praelectiones in Collegio Greshamensi, Anno Dom. 1675. He wrote the epitaph for the monument to his friend Isaac Barrow in Westminster Abbey.

The extent of his share in Sydenham's works has been debated. He is said to have translated from English into Latin his friend Sydenham's Observationes Medicae, published in 1676 (which was dedicated to him by the author), and everything in the edition of Sydenham's works published in 1683, with the exception of the treatise De Hydrope.

== Family ==
On 18 November 1679 Mapletoft married Rebecca, daughter of Lucy Knightley of Hackney, a Hamburg merchant, and younger brother of the Knightleys of Fawsley in Northamptonshire. His wife died on 18 November 1693, the fourteenth anniversary of their wedding-day. By her he had two sons and one daughter: Robert, born in 1684, became fellow of Trinity Hall, Cambridge (LL.B. 1702, LL.D. 1707), advocate of Doctors' Commons (12 July 1707), and commissary of Huntingdon; died on 3 December 1716, and was buried in St. Edward's Church, Cambridge. John, born in 1687, became rector of Broughton in Northamptonshire in 1718, and of Byfield in November 1721, holding both livings till 1753, when he resigned Broughton in favour of his son Nathaniel; he married, on 23 November 1721, Ann, daughter of Richard Walker of Harborough, and died at Byfield on 25 May 1763. Elizabeth, married, 20 August 1703, Francis Gastrell, bishop of Chester, and died on 2 February 1761.
