= Martin Elliott =

British surgeon

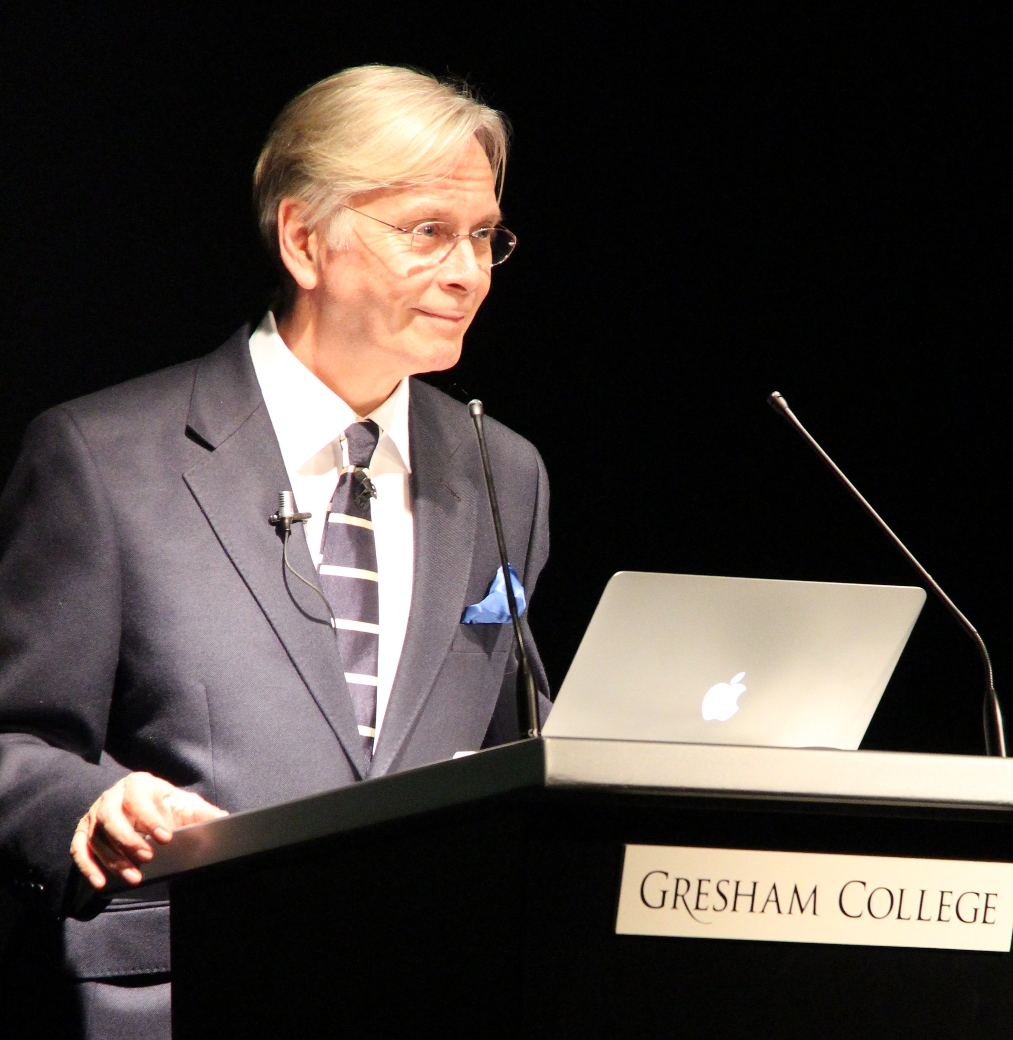
- Martin Elliott delivering a Gresham College lecture
- Born: 8 March 1951 (age 75); Sheffield, England
- Scientific career
- Fields: Medicine; Paediatric Care; Heart; Tracheal Disease; Slide Tracheoplasty Operations
- Workplaces: Great Ormond Street Hospital; University College London; Gresham College

Martin John Elliott (born 8 March 1951) is a British surgeon. He is presently (appointed 2022) Provost of Gresham College, taking over from Simon Thurley. Elliott was 37th Professor of Physic at Gresham College from 2014 to 2018, where he is also Emeritus Professor and Fellow. He delivered a series of free public lectures on The Heart of the Matter, "to explore [...] the challenging medical, ethical, financial and political issues of our time."

He is Emeritus Professor of Cardiothoracic Surgery at University College London, a post to which he was appointed in 2004.

Since 2017 he has been a non-executive director of The Royal Marsden Hospital NHS Foundation Trust, and since 2017 he has been a non-executive director of Children's Health Ireland in Dublin.

He is a senior advisor to PA Consulting and a member of the Industry Advisory Council of Novartis UK. He is a trustee of Epilepsy Research UK.

== Early life ==
Elliott was born on 8 March 1951 in Sheffield, England. He attended King Edward VII School in Sheffield from 1962 to 1968 before studying medicine at Newcastle University.

== Career ==
Elliott held professorial house surgeon and physician posts at the Royal Victoria Infirmary in Newcastle upon Tyne before becoming a Demonstrator in Anatomy at Newcastle University in 1974. He then spent a year in Southampton as an SHO before returning to Newcastle to join the surgical training rotation scheme. He was appointed Fellow of the Royal College of Surgeons of England in 1978 and Senior Registrar (and academic ‘First Assistant) in Cardiothoracic Surgery the same year.

Concurrent with this post he conducted research into The Metabolic Consequences of Cardio-Pulmonary Bypass and was awarded a Doctorate in Medicine (MD) by Newcastle University in 1983.

He became fascinated by the treatment of congenital heart disease and was appointed Senior Registrar in Paediatric Cardiothoracic Surgery at The Great Ormond Street Hospital for Children, London in 1984, training with Professor Marc de Leval and Mr. Jaroslav Stark.

Elliott was appointed a consultant paediatric cardiothoracic surgeon at Great Ormond Street Hospital in 1985 a post he held until 2019. He was appointed Professor of Cardiothoracic Surgery at University College London in 2004.

At Great Ormond Street, Elliott led the Cardiothoracic and Critical Care Directorate from 2000 to 2010 and became Co-Medical Director on 11 June 2010, replacing Robert Evans. He held this post until 2015.

In 2000, Elliott established a team to treat children with severe tracheal disease with a particular interest in long-segment tracheal stenosis. This team grew to become the world-renowned National Service for Severe Tracheal Disease in Children, and pioneered several innovative therapies including slide tracheoplasty, stenting and later transplantation. His team performed the first stem-cell-supported tracheal transplant in a child.

Elliott also led the Thoracic Transplantation Service at Great Ormond Street from 2000 to 2010.

From 2018 through 2020, Elliott was a member of the China Tribunal, a people's tribunal established to assess allegations of forced organ harvesting and other severe human rights abuses in Chinese detention camps. The judgment of the Tribunal, that China was guilty beyond reasonable doubt, was published in 2020.

From 2017 to 2022 Elliott was Chief Medical Officer of Allocate Software Ltd.

== Other research work ==
Elliott is known for his research into the pathophysiology of cardiopulmonary bypass, particularly ultrafiltration and modified ultrafiltration and for work on the treatment of tracheal disorders in children. He established the European Congenital Heart Defects Database in the early 1990s, which was the forerunner of the EACTS and STS registries. He was also founding president of the International Nomenclature Society for CHD.

With the rest of the team at Great Ormond Street, he was engaged in successful work to improve teamwork using human factors research with Formula 1 teams and with the aviation industry. He became involved with Formula 1 by noticing similarities between teams dealing with pitstops and the transfer of patients from theatre to intensive care.

Elliott is widely published with over 300 peer-reviewed articles and many book chapters. He has delivered over 450 invited lectures worldwide, and has taught surgery and operated throughout the world, training many of the world's leading paediatric cardiothoracic surgeons. He has held visiting professorships throughout the world. He was the 2015 Hunterian Orator at The Royal College of Surgeons of England

He has provided evidence to the Bristol Inquiry, about the Bristol heart scandal in the 1990s, and the Francis Inquiry related to the importance of information provision for quality improvement.

== Scholarships and awards ==
1973 The Goyder Scholarship for Clinical Medicine and Surgery, University of Newcastle upon Tyne

1982 The Charles Hahn European Young Research Workers Prize Silver Medal (Stockholm)

2008 NHS Platinum Clinical Excellence Award

2011 One of 'Britain's Top 50 Surgeons', The Times, December

2012 JH Gibbon Lifetime Achievement Award of the American Society for Extracorporeal Technology (AMSECT)

2012 One of 'Britain's Top Paediatric Doctors', The Times, December

2014 One of NHS's 'Top 50 Innovators', Health Service Journal

2015 The Hunterian Medal from the Royal College of Surgeons of England

2015 The Olaf AF Acral Medal from the Swedish Surgical Society

== Personal life ==
Elliott is married to Lesley, a former hospital and research manager. They had two sons, Becan, a filmmaker, and Toby who died in 2009 age 26 of SUDEP about which Elliott has spoken publicly.

Elliott enjoys reading, watching sport, playing tennis, cycling and walking the dog in his spare time. He and Lesley have an allotment to grow vegetables.
