= George Henry Wathen =

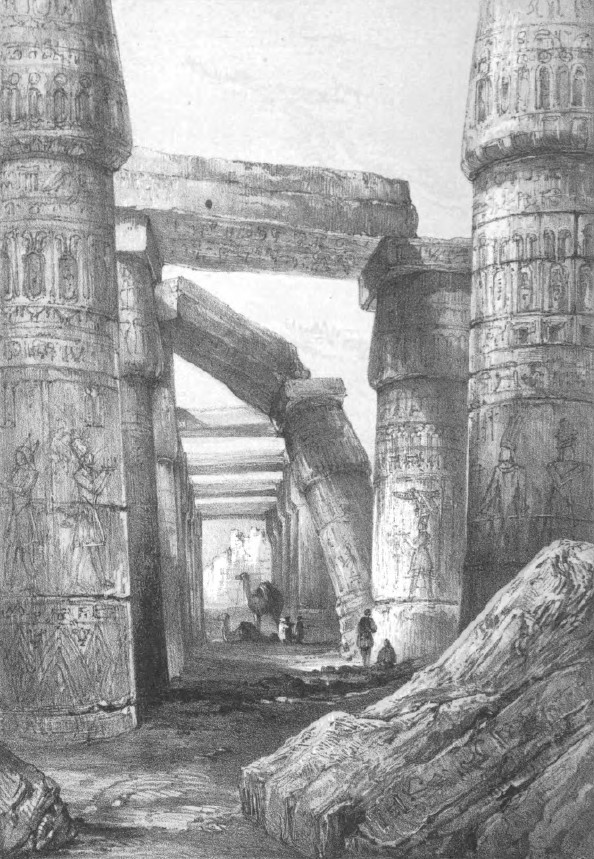
A sketch of the Temple of Karnak in Thebes by George Henry Wathen from his book Arts, Antiquity and Chronology of Ancient Egypt (1843).

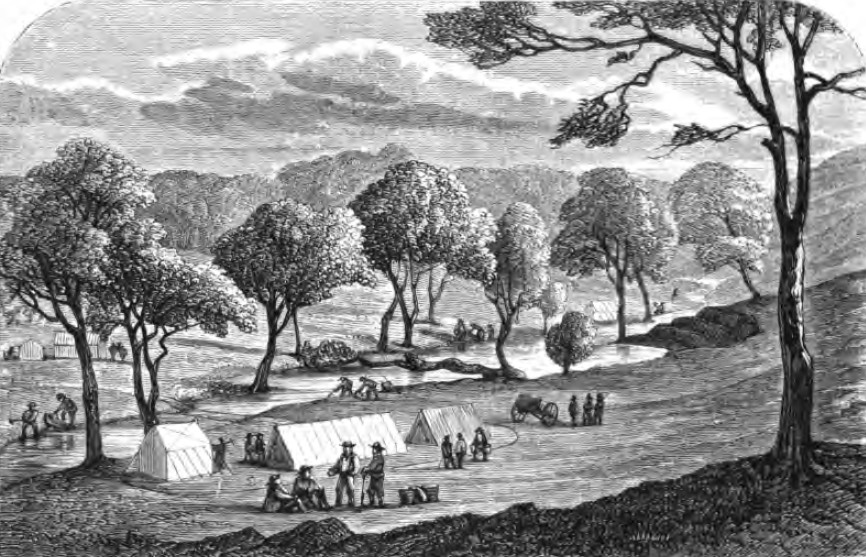
A sketch by George Henry Wathen of the Victoria gold fields from his book The Golden Colony, or Victoria in 1854 (1855).

George Henry Wathen, FGS (21 November 1816 – 10 November 1879) was a geologist, author, magazine publisher, and South African politician of the Victorian era known primarily for his books on the antiquities of Egypt, and the gold fields of Victoria, Australia.

== Early life and career ==
Wathen was born on 21 November 1816 in Surrey, England to Nathaniel Wathen (1772–1856) and his wife Mary Beardmore (1779–1838). His father was a wealthy clothier from Stroud, Gloucestershire and the secretary of the British and Foreign Bible Society in London, and his mother was the niece of Archdeacon John Owen (1754–1824), the Chaplain General of the British Armed Forces. Wathen was baptised twice, first on 5 March 1817 at his uncle John Owen's church at St Benet Paul's Wharf in London, and second on 12 November 1818 at the parish church in his parents’ home town of Stroud. He studied architecture as a young man and travelled as part of his education, and at his parents' expense, to Egypt, where he spent much of 1839 making observations on ancient Egyptian architecture. This resulted in the 1843 publication of his book on The Arts, Antiquity and Chronology of Ancient Egypt, which contained his own illustrations. Returning to London, he was diagnosed with the eye disease ophthalmia, which is said to have resulted in additional health problems that plagued him for much of his life.

Wathen next sailed about 1850 to Port Phillip in Victoria, Australia, arriving prior to the 1851 Victorian gold rush, and explored the gold fields in the colony. This resulted in a short paper published in 1853 by the Geological Society of London, which was followed by his second book, The Golden Colony, or Victoria in 1854, which again was sparsely illustrated with some of his own sketches. Despite his lack of training as either a geologist or mining engineer, the release of the Golden Colony was perfectly timed to capitalise on the excitement of both the Australian and Californian gold rushes, and it was widely read by "arm-chair adventurers" in both England and the United States. As a consequence, he was elected in April 1855 as a fellow of the Geological Society.

He also published, beginning in 1850 in Geelong, Victoria, a quarterly magazine called the Australasian, which reprinted articles from English magazines that for the most part were not available in Australia. Dr. Theophilus Thompson, who was Wathen's brother-in-law, served as his London agent, and sent two copies of the magazine to the writer Charles Dickens for comment. Dickens politely wrote back to Thompson in a 27 June 1851 letter that though the Australasian was "a most creditable production, it would be more encouraging if the articles were honestly purchased, rather than pirated." Nonetheless, 8 volumes of the Australasian were published over two years, with a total of 600 pages.

Wathen returned to England in 1854 to marry, and then brought his wife in 1857 to South Africa, where he acquired land near Richmond, KwaZulu-Natal, built the "Deepdene" homestead, became a sheep rancher, and raised a family. He became active in local politics and was elected in 1862 to the Natal Legislative Council (Parliament), serving until 1867, when a fall from a horse forced him to retire to England. He settled first in urban Wandsworth, Surrey, then at the small resort town of Bexhill-on-Sea, Sussex, but generally spent his winters in southern France, and in Italy, where he died 10 November 1879 in the parish of Viareggio, Lucca in Tuscany, buried there in a Protestant cemetery. Although he is generally portrayed as being in habitual poor health, and always travelling in search of warmer, healthier climates, he nonetheless survived to be almost 63 years old when he died.

== Personal life ==
Wathen on 5 August 1854 married Ann Margaret Geary (b. 1821) in Clifton, a parish near Bristol, Gloucestershire. They had a daughter, Florence Emmeline Wathen (1859–1953), born in Natal, and two sons.
