= Alfred Essex =

English painter

Alfred Essex (died 1871 in South Africa), was an English enamel-painter, who worked with his brother William Essex to popularise enamel painting in the 19th century.

== Life ==
Little is known of the parentage and early life of Alfred Essex and his brother William. The brothers worked for and under Charles Muss, enamel painter to William IV, trying to show to the public that works could be executed in enamel possessing the transparency, crispness, and texture of other methods of painting. Alfred Essex executed plates for Muss, notably a large plate depicting the Holy Family, after Parmigianino, now in the royal collection. He prepared the plates and the colours for his brother's paintings. The Geological Museum holds a series of examples showing the colours prepared by him which had the quality of remaining the same after vitrification. He published a paper on the art of enamel painting in June 1837, and also published some drawing-slates. He later emigrated to South Africa, where he left a daughter Harriet.
