= William Essex (painter) =

English painter

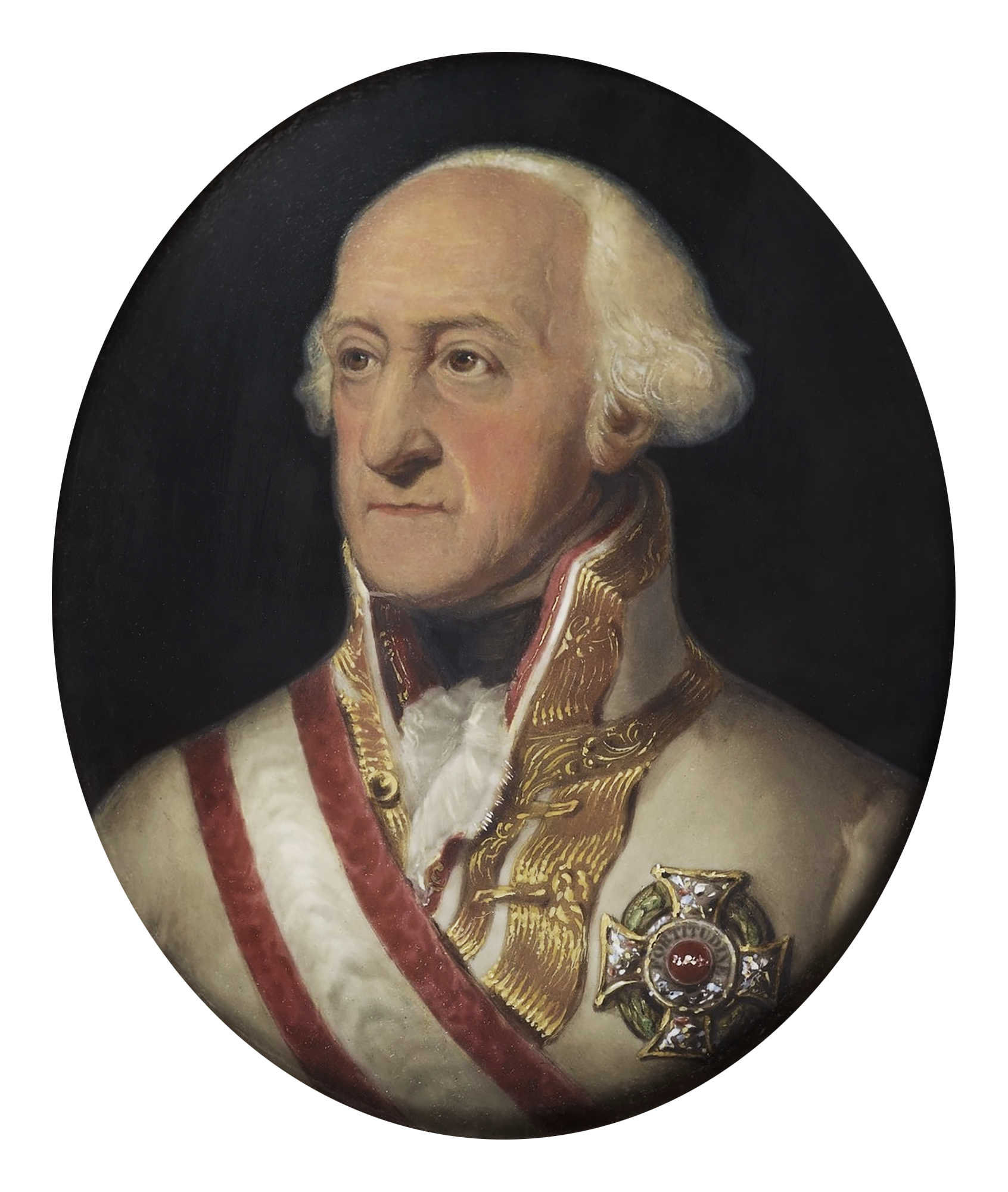
Portrait of Prince Frederick Josias of Saxe-Coburg-Saalfeld painted by Ferdinand Jagemann, enamel painting by William Essex, Royal Collection, 1848

William Essex (c.1784 – 29 December 1869, Brighton), was an English enamel-painter. He was the chief mid-nineteenth-century exponent of enamel painting, an art which had been extended from portrait miniatures to larger enamel plaques by Henry Bone in the early nineteenth century.

== Life ==
Little is known of the parentage and early life of William Essex and his brother Alfred (died 1871). The brothers worked for and under Charles Muss, enamel painter to William IV, trying to show to the public that works could be executed in enamel possessing the transparency, crispness, and texture of other methods of painting. Essex accordingly painted numerous miniature reproductions of pictures by Correggio, Guido, Wilkie, Abraham Cooper, Sir Joshua Reynolds, and others, displaying the wide capacity of the art. An exhibition of these was held in the spring of 1839, accompanied by a privately printed catalogue.

Essex had first exhibited at the Royal Academy in 1818, sending a 'Terrier's Head' after Abraham Cooper, and continued to exhibit copies and portraits there up to 1864. He also contributed to the exhibitions at the British Institution, Suffolk Street Gallery, and the Liverpool Society of Fine Arts. From 1830–1837, he lived at Upper Woburn Place in Bloomsbury.

He was appointed enamel-painter to Princess Augusta of Cambridge, in 1839 to Queen Victoria, and subsequently to Prince Albert.

Essex also instructed fellow painter John William Bailey. He died at Brighton 29 December 1869, aged 85.

William Essex and his first wife, Martha, had several children. The first, Martha, was baptized on 13 January 1814. A son, William B. Essex (1822–1852), followed his father's profession as an artist: though prevented by his early death from obtaining any reputation, he exhibited at the Royal Academy from 1845 to 1851. Another daughter, Hannah Essex (baptized 29 May 1832, married name Bird) also practised as a miniature painter who worked in enamels based at her fargwe's address. She exhibited her work in the 1850s at the Royal Academy and the British Institution.
